= Lake Chad flooded savanna =

Flooded grassland ecoregion in Africa

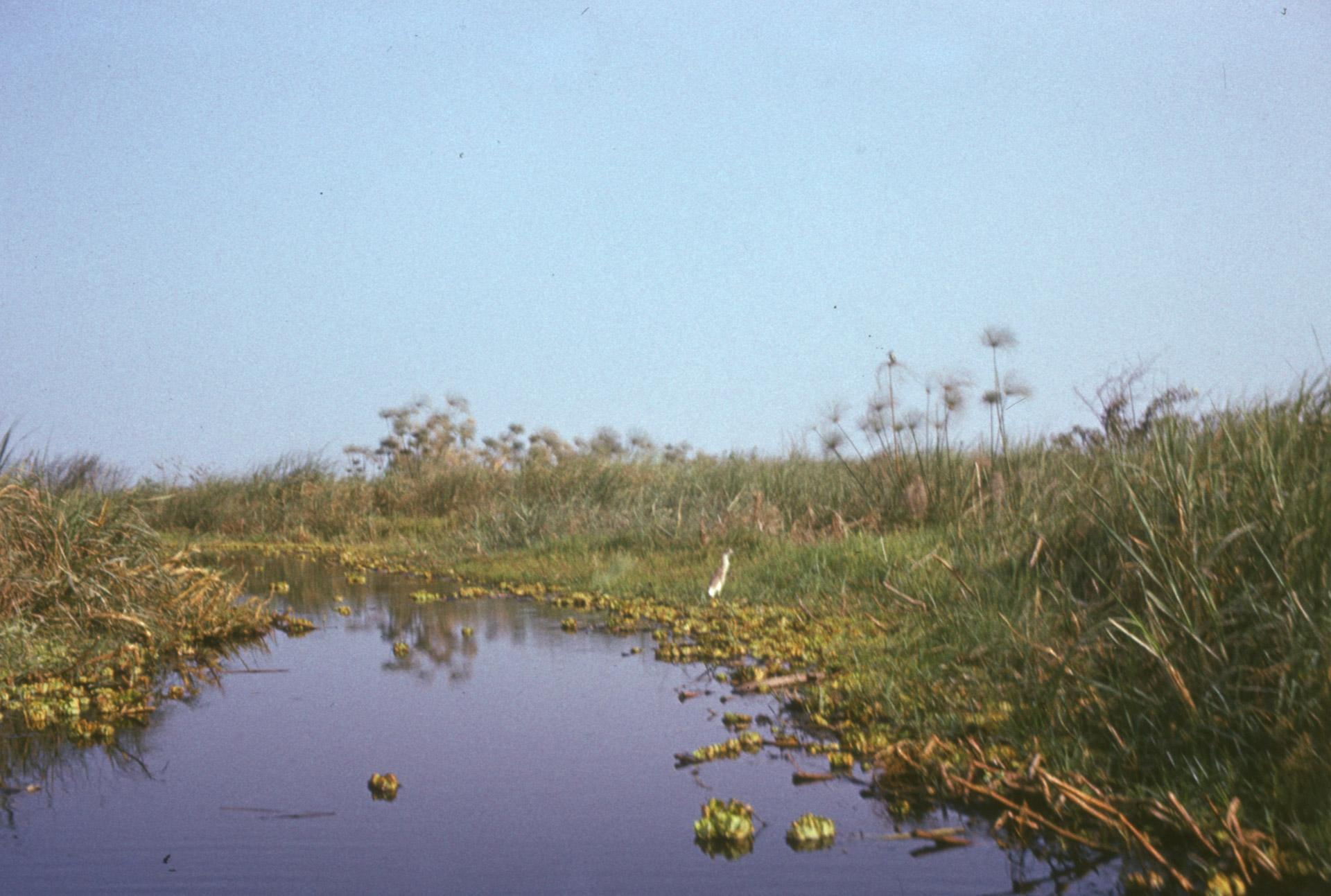

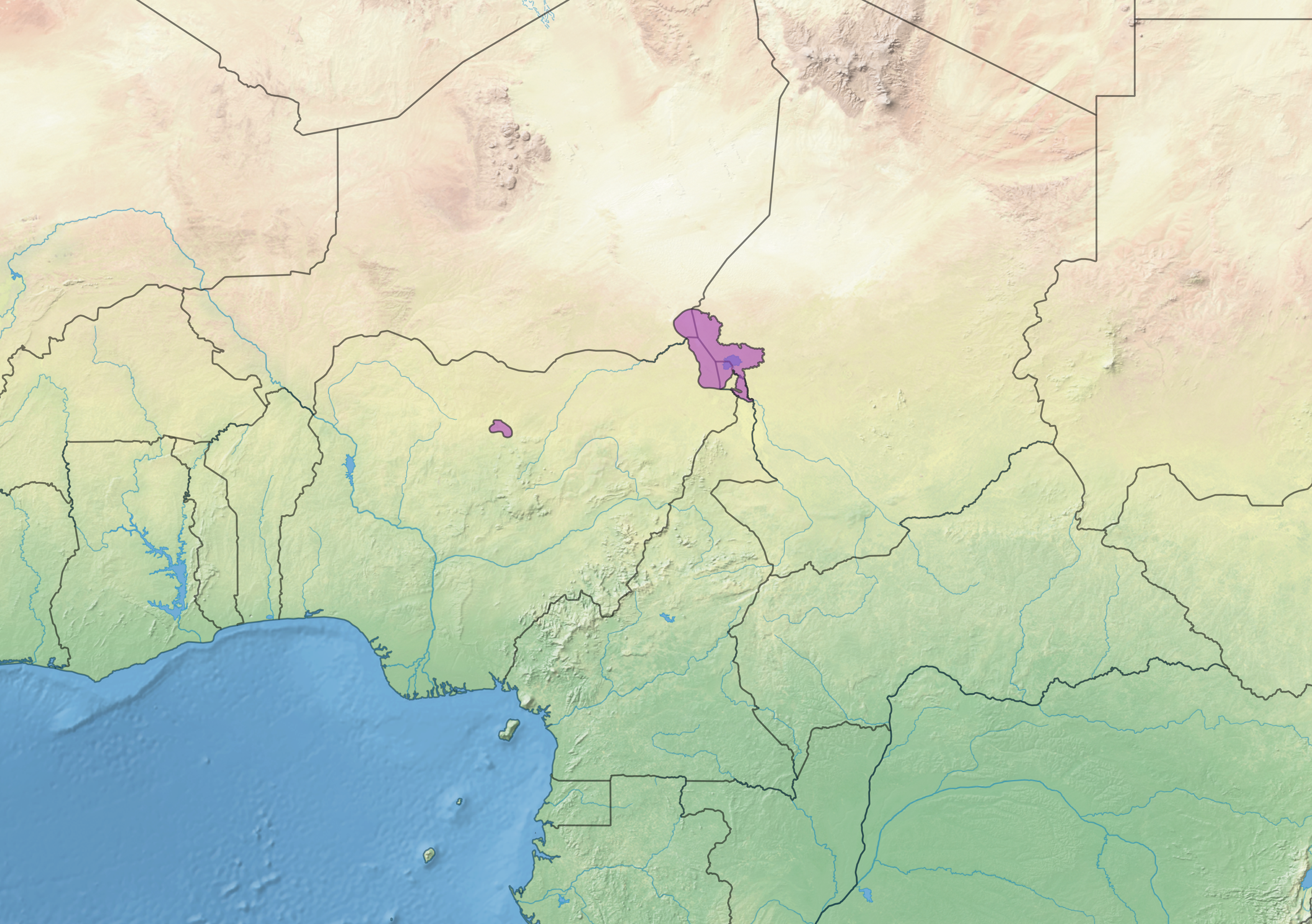
- Map of the Lake Chad flooded savanna (purple)

Ecology
- Realm: Afrotropical
- Biome: flooded grasslands and savannas
- Borders: Sahelian Acacia savanna; West Sudanian savanna

Geography
- Area: 31,988 km^{2} (12,351 sq mi)
- Countries: Cameroon; Chad; Niger; Nigeria

Conservation
- Conservation status: Critical/endangered
- Protected: 14,732 km^{2} (46%)

The Lake Chad flooded savanna is a flooded grasslands and savannas ecoregion in Africa. It includes the seasonally- and permanently-flooded grasslands and savannas in the basin of Lake Chad in Central Africa, and covers portions of Cameroon, Chad, Niger, and Nigeria.

== Geography ==
Lake Chad is a large shallow lake, lying at the center of a large closed drainage basin, with no outlet to the sea. The Lake Chad basin has an area of 2,381,635 square kilometres (919,554 sq mi). The northern portion of the basin is arid or semi-arid, and the southern portion has a seasonally-dry savanna climate.

The flooded savannas surround the lake. The Chari and Logone rivers, which drain northwards from the highlands along the basin's southern edge, supply 95% of Lake Chad's freshwater. The Yobe River, which flows eastwards into the lake's northern end, contributes 2.5% of the lake's inflow.

Despite having no outlet, Lake Chad has relatively low salinity. The saltier waters sink to the bottom of the lake, and drain northwards via underground conduits. The southern portion of the lake, which receives far more river inflow, is generally less salty than the northern portion.

The ecoregion also includes the Hadejia-Nguru wetlands in northern Nigeria. These seasonal wetlands form at the confluence of the Hadejia and the Jama'are rivers, part of the Yobe River system lying west of the lake. These wetlands expand to 6,000 km^{2} during the rivers' late-August peak, with a water surface area of 2,000 km^{2}.

The Lake Chad portion of the ecoregion is surrounded by the Sahelian Acacia savanna ecoregion, a belt of dry savanna which runs east and west across Africa south of the Sahara Desert. The Hadejia-Nguru wetlands are bounded by the West Sudanian savanna ecoregion.

== Climate ==
The climate is tropical and dry, with 320 mm of annual rainfall on the lake. Rainfall is concentrated during the June through October rainy season. March to June is hot and dry, and the November through February winter months are dry and cooler. Evaporation exceeds precipitation during most months.

== Flora ==
The lake includes areas of open water and shallow-water reed beds. Common reed bed plants in the southern part of the lake include Cyperus papyrus, Phragmites mauritianus, and Vossia cuspidata. Phragmites australis and Typha domingensis are more common in the saltier northern part of the lake. Nile lettuce (Pistia stratiotes) is a floating plant that occasionally forms large beds across open-water areas.

Vegetation in seasonally-flooded areas varies with the depth and duration of seasonal flooding. Yaéré grasslands are found in frequently-flooded areas at the southern end of the lake. Characteristic plants include Echinochloa pyramidalis, Vetiveria nigritana, Oryza longistaminata, and Hyparrhenia rufa. Where seasonal flooding is shallower and shorter in duration, Trees and shrubs are present, ranging from savannas to woodlands, locally known as ‘karal’ or ‘firki’. Acacia seyal is the predominant tree, with Acacia nilotica around depressions. An understory of grasses and shrubs grows 2 to 3 meters high, and includes Caperonia palustris, Echinochloa colona, Hibiscus asper, Hygrophila auriculata, Sorghum purpureosericeum, and Schoenfeldia gracilis.

== Fauna ==
The flooded grasslands and savannas are an important habitat for water birds, including Palearctic migrants that over-winter here. The river prinia (Prinia fluviatilis) and rusty lark (Mirafra rufa) are resident birds which inhabit the Lake Chad flooded savannas and other wetlands in the Sahel.

== Threats ==
The lake has shrunk considerably in recent decades, becoming much shallower and smaller in extent.

== Protected areas ==
A 2017 assessment found that 14,732 km^{2}, or 46%, of the ecoregion is in protected areas.
