= Ahmad Lawan =

Nigerian politician (born 1959)

Ahmad Lawan GCON
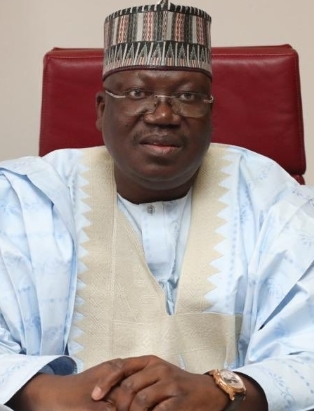

14th President of the Nigerian Senate
- In office 11 June 2019 – 11 June 2023
- Deputy: Ovie Omo-Agege
- Preceded by: Abubakar Bukola Saraki
- Succeeded by: Godswill Akpabio

Senate Majority Leader
- In office 10 January 2017 – 9 June 2019
- Preceded by: Mohammed Ali Ndume
- Succeeded by: Yahaya Abubakar Abdullahi

Senator for Yobe North
- Incumbent
- Assumed office 5 June 2007
- Preceded by: Usman Albishir

Member of the House of Representatives of Nigeria from Yobe
- In office 3 June 1999 – 5 June 2007
- Preceded by: Constituency established
- Succeeded by: Zakariyau Galadima
- Constituency: Bade/Jakusko

Personal details
- Born: Ahmad Ibrahim Lawan; 12 January 1959 (age 67) Gashua, Northern Region, British Nigeria (now in Yobe State, Nigeria)
- Party: All Progressives Congress (2013–present)
- Other political affiliations: All Nigeria Peoples Party (before 2013)
- Education: Sabon Gari Primary School, Gashua; Government Secondary School, Gashua
- Alma mater: University of Maiduguri; Ahmadu Bello University; Cranfield University
- Profession: Politician; professor

Ahmad Ibrahim Lawan GCON (born 12 January 1959) is a Nigerian politician and former lecturer who served as the 14th president of the Nigerian Senate from 2019 to 2023. He represents the Yobe North Senatorial District in the Senate as a member of the All Progressives Congress.

A university lecturer from Gashua, Lawan was first elected to the House of Representatives in 1999 to represent the Bade/Jakusko Constituency as a member of the All Nigeria Peoples Party. Lawan was reelected in 2003 before successfully running to become Yobe North Senator in 2007. After being reelected in 2011, 2015, and 2019 (as a member of the All Progressive Congress, successor to the ANPP), Lawan was elected the new Senate President with 79 votes cast to beat Senator Mohammed Ali Ndume with 28 votes after the inauguration of the 9th Nigeria National Assembly in 2019. It was his second attempt at becoming Senate President, with a notable failed run in 2015.

== Early life and education ==
Lawan was born on 12 January 1959 in Gashua, then in the north of British Nigeria. He completed primary school at Sabon Gari Primary School, Gashua in 1974 and secondary school at Government Secondary School, Gashua in 1979 before receiving a bachelor's degree in geography from the University of Maiduguri in 1984.

After university, Lawan completed his compulsory service year in Benue State before getting a master's degree in Remote Sensing from the Ahmadu Bello University and a Doctorate degree in Remote Sensing/GIS from Cranfield University in 1990 and 1996, respectively.

== Early career ==
Lawan worked in the Yobe State Civil Service as an Education Officer in the state Ministry of Education in 1985 and 1986 before lecturing at his alma mater, University of Maiduguri between 1987 and 1997.

== Political career ==
After being elected to the House of Representatives for the constituency of Bade/Jakusko in 1999, at different times Lawan chaired the House Committees on education and agriculture.

Lawan was elected to the Senate in 2007. In 2008, he was a member of the National Assembly's Joint Committee on Constitution Review.

In 2009, as chairman of the Senate committee on Public Accounts, Lawan initiated and sponsored the Desertification Control Commission Bill.

In August 2009, Senator Lawan spoke against the proposed Kafin Zaki Dam. He stated that the Tiga Dam and Challawa Gorge Dam had already reduced water flow drastically, and the Jama'are River was now the main source of water in the Yobe River. He said the dams caused intense poverty, increased desert encroachment, migration and conflicts between arable farmers and herdsmen.

Lawan ran for reelection in Yobe North Senatorial District on the ANPP platform in the 9 April 2011 elections. He won with 92,799 votes, trailed by Hassan Kafayos Hussaini of the People's Democratic Party (PDP) with 76,960 votes. Four years later, Lawan won reelection as a member of the APC before winning with 72% of the vote in 2019.

Lawan was named chairman, Senate committee on defence on 8 August 2023.

== Senate Presidency ==
=== 2015 election ===
In 2015 Lawan ran for the senate president after APC zoned the position to the north east of Nigeria based on the party's power-sharing formula among the six geo-political zones at the time. The zoning meant that only senators elected on the platform of the party (APC) from the six states in the north east could run for senate president. After consultations with critical political stakeholders and senators elect from the north east, Lawan was endorsed and presented to the national leadership of the party who anointed him as the candidate of the party for senate president. The APC zoning arrangement prevented other senators-elect who were from other zones from contesting for the seat. But senator Bukola Saraki from Kwara State, north central Nigeria disagreed with the party's arrangement saying all qualified candidates should be allowed to exercise their constitutional rights to run for positions of leadership of the Nigerian Senate. Saraki declared his candidacy against the party's zoning principle.

On the morning of 9 June 2015 the day for the election of the senate president 51 senators of the APC gathered at the International Conference Centre waiting for a truce meeting reportedly called by the leadership of the APC and President Muhammadu Buhari with a clear objective to prevail on senator Saraki to drop his ambition and support Lawan when 57 senators mostly of the opposition PDP and a few senators of APC present conducted the election. Saraki won the election by 57 unanimous votes of the senators present during the election. Lawan was at the International Conference Centre when the election was conducted and a winner emerged. That event finally nailed his ambition for the president of the 8th senate.

=== 2019 election ===
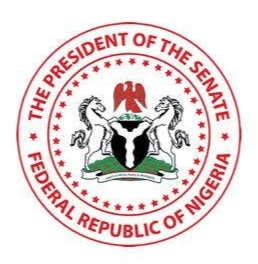

After meeting with the Nigerian president Muhammadu Buhari on Thursday, 6 June 2019, Senator Danjuma Goje stepped down for Lawan from the Senate Presidency race. On 11 June 2019, Lawan was elected and sworn in as the Senate President of the Nigerian 9th Assembly, after defeating his opponent, Senator Ali Ndume who is also an APC Senator. Lawan defeated his opponent with 79 votes to 28.

== Corruption allegations ==
After the passage of the Petroleum Industry Bill (PIB) in August 2021, Lawan and other legislators were accused of receiving bribes to guarantee the legislation's advancement despite significant public opposition to parts of the text. According to Peoples Gazette reporting, at least $10 million was paid to legislators in payments organized by Minister of State for Petroleum Resources Timipre Sylva and Akwa Ibom North-East Senator Bassey Albert Akpan with between $1.5 million and $2 million going to both Lawan and House Speaker Femi Gbajabiamila. Multiple legislators corroborated the story with several legislators expressing anger, not that Gbajabiamila and Lawan allegedly took bribes but instead that the bribes were not shared equally among the legislators as other legislators claimed to have received $5,000 for representatives and $20,000 for senators. Gbajabiamila, Lawan, Sylva, and Akpan all initially declined to comment on the report. Several days after the story broke, Lawan denied it, stating that the report was "unwarranted, unproven, and false" before warning Nigerians to "always think positive about their leaders and their governments" and advising that "if they have issues they feel very strongly about, let them speak the truth and we are prepared to tell corrections that that we feel should be able to make us do better."

== Awards ==
In October 2022, a Nigerian National Honour of Grand Commander of the Order of the Niger (GCON) was conferred on him by President Muhammadu Buhari.

House of Representatives of Nigeria
New constituency	Member of the House of Representatives for Bade/Jakusko; 1999–2007	Succeeded by Zakariyau Galadima
Senate of Nigeria
Preceded by Usman Albishir	Senator for Yobe North; 2007–present	Incumbent
Preceded by Mohammed Ali Ndume	Senate Majority Leader; 2017–2019	Succeeded by Yahaya Abubakar Abdullahi
Preceded by Bukola Saraki	President of the Senate of Nigeria; 2019–2023	Succeeded by Godswill Akpabio
