= Kafin Zaki Dam =

Nigeria Dam

Coordinates: 10.8833°N 9.5833°E

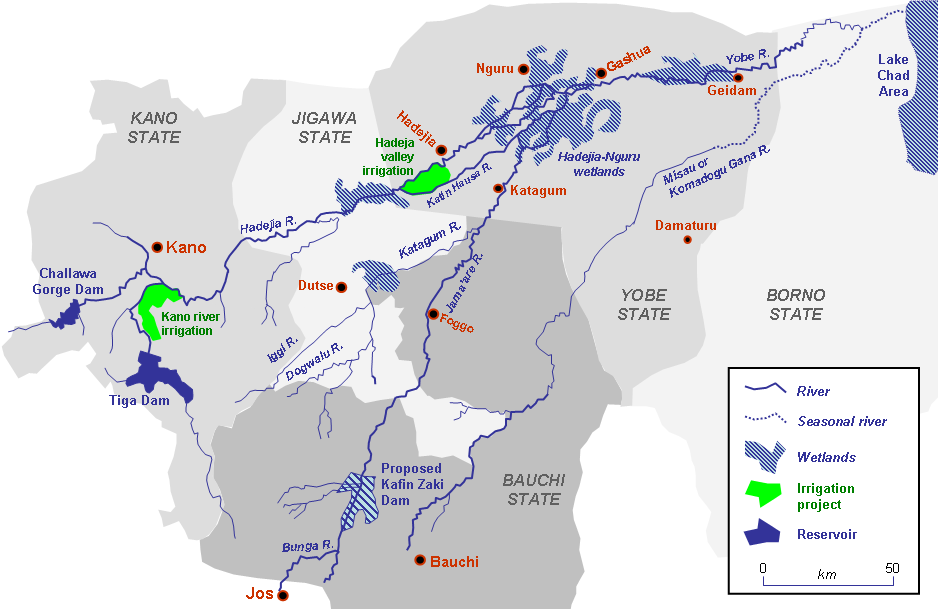
Catchment area of the Yobe River

The Kafin Zaki Dam is a controversial project to build a reservoir on the Jama'are River (also called the Bunga River in its upper reaches) in Bauchi State in the Northeast of Nigeria.

== Proposed dam and reservoir ==
The proposed dam would be of zoned earthfill construction and would be 11 kilometres-long. It would be designed with the potential to install a 15 MW hydroelectric plant. The reservoir would have a storage capacity of 2,700 million cubic metres, and would be the second largest in Nigeria after the Kainji Dam. It would irrigate 120,000 hectares (1,200 km^{2}; 460 mi^{2}; 300,000 acres) of arable land on which cash crops could be grown. Potentially the project would support production of one million tonnes of sugarcane annually and provide over one million jobs in industries related to agriculture.

== Project history ==
The dam was first considered after the 1972-1974 drought in the Sahel, and during the Shehu Shagari regime in 1979-1982, a contract was awarded to Julius Berger Nigeria to build the dam. In 1984, the contract was terminated, but it was reinstated in 1992 by the Ibrahim Babangida regime. In 1994, the Sani Abacha regime terminated the contract again, and set up a judicial committee of inquiry into all aspects of the project. In 2002, funding was allocated for the project, but then abruptly withdrawn.

In 2008, Governor Isa Yuguda of Bauchi State awarded a contract to the Dangote Group to restart the abandoned dam project, a move that was supported by Abdul Ahmed Ningi, a Bauchi state representative who was House Leader in the National Assembly when the project was cancelled in 2002. Former Vice President Mohammed Namadi Sambo visited the dam site in November 2013 and gave stakeholders assurances that the federal government would build it.

Speaking at the project site in Bauchi, Sambo claimed that the action would end a curse that successive state administrations had attempted to break for more than three decades.

"In line with Mr. President's transformation agenda, he has directed me to proceed with ensuring that this project is implemented for the benefit of the people of the northeastern region of this country," Sambo had said to the villagers who welcomed him at the site of the proposed dam. According to the Ministry of Water Resources' suggested design evaluation, the dam project will guarantee the development of at least 125,000 hectares (1,250 km^{2}; 480 mi^{2}; 310,000 acres) of irrigable land.

80,000 hectares (800 km^{2}; 310 mi^{2}; 200,000 acres) of that land would be in Bauchi, 25,000 hectares (250 km^{2}; 97 mi^{2}; 62,000 acres) in Yobe, 15,000 hectares (150 km^{2}; 58 mi^{2}; 37,000 acres) in Borno, and 5,000 hectares (50 km^{2}; 19 mi^{2}; 12,000 acres) in Bauchi.

When completed, the dam project under the Jama'are-Yobe basin, according to Sambo, will produce 100,000 tonnes of fish per year in addition to 15 megawatts of hydroelectric power and 45 megawatts of biofuels.

With his host, Governor Yuguda, his predecessor, Ahmadu Adamu Mu'azu, and the Emir of Ningi, Yunusa Mohammed Danyaya, by his sides, Sambo declared that the federal government was unwaveringly committed to the project's realization as part of the transformation objective of the previous president, Goodluck Jonathan. He stated that in order to ensure that all facets of the community along the river benefited from the program, the federal government was thoroughly assessing the project designs for additional cascade dams in addition to Kafin Zaki, such as those in Yobe and other states.

== Controversy ==
Arguments in favor of the dam from supporters in Bauchi State include the benefits of irrigation for agriculture in the area, such as sugar cane crops, while controlled releases would avoid downstream impact. Opponents in downstream Yobe State and Borno State argue that the dam will prevent the seasonal floods that their farmers depend upon for farming, and will cause the water table to drop, with much water being lost to evaporation. Environmentalists are also concerned about the impact on downstream wetlands.

Floodplain farmers and fishermen use water much more efficiently than farmers who rely on irrigation from dams. A study funded by the United Nations Environment Programme (UNEP) estimated that the economic value of water in the downstream Hadejia-Jama'are floodplain was US$32.00 per 1,000 m^{3}, while the value of water in the Kano River Project, irrigated by the Tiga Dam and the Challawa Gorge Dam was US$1.73 per 1,000 m^{3}, or US$0.04 per 1,000 m^{3} after accounting for operational costs. The study estimated that if implemented, even with a regulated flooding regime to reduce downstream impact, the Kafin Zaki dam project would have negative value of around US$15 million.

In April 2009, Dr. Hassan Bidliya, Administrative Secretary of the Hadejia-Jama'are-Komadugu-Yobe Basin Trust Fund, advised that any decision should be deferred until the Environmental Impact Assessment on the project had been completed. In September 2009, three farmers’ associations in downstream Borno State called for the federal government and Bauchi State government to shelve the project, concerned about the impact on their livelihood. In August 2009, Senator Ahmed Ibrahim Lawan of Yobe North, Chairman of the Senate Committee on Public Accounts, spoke against the proposed dam. He stated that the Tiga and Challawa dams on the Hadejia River had already reduced downstream water flow drastically, and the Jama'are River was now the main source of water in the Yobe River. He said the dams caused intense poverty, increased desert encroachment, migration and conflicts between arable farmers and herdsmen.

== See also ==
- Hadejia-Nguru wetlands
