= Nguru =

Nguru may refer to:

- Pila Nguru, an aboriginal people of Australia
- Nguru (flute), a small Māori nose flute from New Zealand
- Nguru, Nigeria, a town and LGA in Yobe State
- Hadejia-Nguru wetlands, northern Nigeria
- Nguru Lake, a lake which forms part of the aforementioned wetlands
- Nguru Mountains, a mountain range in Tanzania
