= Falgore Game Reserve =

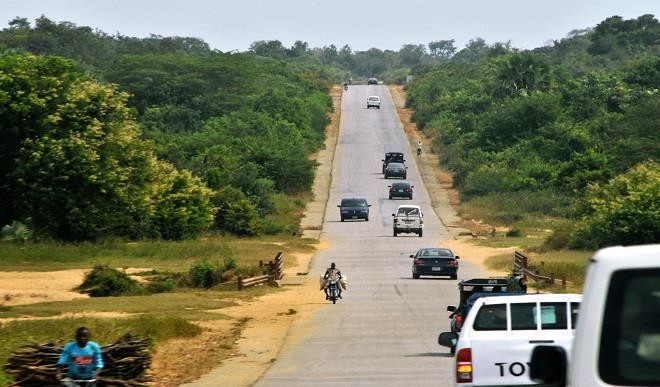
Road in the Falgore Forest in kano State Nigeria

Falgore Game Reserve is protected ecosystem designated mainly for games protection in southern Kano State of northern Nigeria. This game reserve is located about 150 kilometers away from Kano city. It lies in Tudun Wada, Doguwa and Sumaila local government areas. It extends to the boundary line between Kano, Kaduna and Bauchi states respectively. It covers an area of about 1000 square kilometers and is traversed by the River Kano. Falgore game reserve lies on northern guinea savanna ecological belt. This ecosystem is bisected by River Kano. Falgore game reserve started as Kogin Kano forest reserve which was developed since the British colonial era in the 1940s. The forest reserve was only upgraded into a game reserve in the 1960s and subsequently called Falgore game reserve.

== Ecological Functions ==
Falgore game reserve conserves the savanna floral faunal species within their natural habitat. However, one of the main objectives of the game reserve is to serve as regulator of silting and sedimentation that threatens the multipurpose Tiga Dam which is the backbone of the Kano River Project. The villages located around Falgore game reserve believe it offers them a good microclimate and protects them against destructive windstorms.

== Socioeconomic function ==
Falgore game reserve has high potentials for the tourism and recreation industry of Kano State and Nigeria. Inside the reserve, there are beautiful physical features of fascinating attractions, which include a number of rocks and the breathtaking rapids of the river Kano. Still within the park, visitors can also explore the ghost town of Falgore, which is nearly as old as Kano City and has traditional architecture. Accommodation and camping facilities are available around the game reserve. Additionally, during the wet season, Falgore is navigable from Tiga Lake.

== Challenges ==
The main challenges to this important ecosystem is poaching, overgrazing, kidnapping, land encroachment and the unenthusiastic attitude of state government to the socio-ecological values which is rarely found in dryland areas.
