= Kano River Project =

River Project in Kano state Nigeria

Kano River Project is a modern integrated agricultural land use development in Northern Nigeria. River Kano also locally called Kogin Kano. The project is a large scale irrigation project developed under the authority of Hadejia-Juma’are River Basin Development Authority.

== First phase of the Project ==
The project was started in 1971, and the initial research was conducted in 1976–77 and restricted to 3000 acres.

== Commission ==
The Kano River project irrigation was commission by the former vice president, Prof.Yemi Osinbajo. It was commission in 2023.

== Environment and historical development ==
The idea of the project might have started in the 1960s following extensive land use surveys and technical assistance by the British Overseas Development Authority (ODA) and USAID. The principal engineering partners of KRP is Netherlands Engineering and Construction Company (NEDECCO). The project started in earnest after the Nigerian Civil War in the late 1960s. Kano River Project (KRP) covers an extensive floodplain coveringRiver Kano, River Challawa, and their convergence through the Hadejia and Jama'are Rivers. The floodplains of these were only locally tapped unless the development of the KRP. The construction of the Tiga and Challawa Gorge dams upstream was the backbone of KRP a development that stalled flooding. The maximum extent of flooding has declined from 300,000 ha in the 1960s to around 70,000 to 100,000 ha. The Federal Government of Nigeria took over the custody of KRP through the Hadejia Jama'are River Basin Development Authority.

Other officials who participated at the commissioning were the Fair Chief for Jigawa State Service of Water Assets, Hon. Ibrahim Muhammed Garba, Birnin Kudu Nearby Government Executive, Magagi Yusuf, State Government authorities as well as certain Chiefs and Agent Heads of the Bureaucratic Service of Water Assets and Sterilization, with local area leaders, women, youths, and children in the community.

== Economic values ==
KRP is meant to be a large scale agricultural project with focus on irrigation. This major irrigation scheme is planned to cover 66,000 ha. KRP is sub divided into categories, for now only 22,000 ha or KRP 1 is being developed. The project is dependent on Tiga Dam, Bagauda Dam, and Challawa Dam and the floodplains around them. It is suggested that the net economic benefits of the floodplain (agriculture, fishing, fuelwood) were at least US$32 per 1000 m^{3} of water (at 1989 prices). UNEP finds that, the returns per crops grown in the Kano River Project were at most only US$1.73 per 1000 m^{3} and when the operational costs are included, the net benefits of the Project are reduced to US$0.04 per 1000 m^{3}. The development of KRP has changed the economic conditions of many local people who are actively engaged in irrigation activities. Various cash crops are produced under the KRP irrigation projects. These include tomato, pepper, rice, wheat, corn, okro and many others grown for local consumption. The produce are mainly sent to local markets in Kano and to many places in southern Nigeria.

== Challenges ==
KRP is challenged for causing landscape desiccation in the Lake Chad basin through impounding of water in dams. Release of water from dams also causes flooding downstream. KRP cannot be a success considering the fact that since its commencement in 1960s/1970s even the KRP 1 is yet to be fully developed. Another challenge is land tenure, the way and manner land is managed is not transparent. Management of water is also one of the challenges plaguing efficiency and sustainability of the KRP. Pollution is also a critical ecological challenge. The major source of pollution are agrochemical overdose and industrial effluents.
