= 2011 Nigerian Senate elections in Yobe State =

Elections in Nigeria

The 2011 Nigerian Senate election in Yobe State was held on April 9, 2011, to elect members of the Nigerian Senate to represent Yobe State. Bukar Ibrahim representing Yobe East, Ahmad Lawan representing Yobe North and Alkali Abdulkadir Jajere representing Yobe South all won on the platform of All Nigeria Peoples Party.

== Overview ==
Affiliation	Party		Total
Affiliation	ANPP	PDP	Total
Before Election	2	1	3
After Election	3	0	3

== Summary ==
District	Incumbent	Party	Elected Senator	Party
Yobe East	Bukar Ibrahim	ANPP	Bukar Ibrahim	ANPP
Yobe North	Ahmad Lawan	ANPP	Ahmad Lawan	ANPP
Yobe South	Adamu Garba Talba	PDP	Alkali Abdulkadir Jajere	ANPP

== Results ==
=== Yobe East ===
All Nigeria Peoples Party candidate Bukar Ibrahim won the election, defeating People's Democratic Party candidate Lawan Jaro Zarami and other party candidates.

2011 Nigerian Senate election in Yobe State
Party	Candidate	Votes	%
ANPP	Bukar Ibrahim		
PDP	Lawan Jaro Zarami		
Total votes			
ANPP hold			

=== Yobe North ===
All Nigeria Peoples Party candidate Ahmad Lawan won the election, defeating People's Democratic Party candidate Hassan Kafayos Husseini and other party candidates.

2011 Nigerian Senate election in Yobe State
Party	Candidate	Votes	%
ANPP	Ahmad Lawan		
PDP	Hassan Kafayos Husseini		
Total votes			
ANPP hold			

=== Yobe South ===
All Nigeria Peoples Party candidate Alkali Abdulkadir Jajere won the election, defeating People's Democratic Party candidate Adamu Garba Talba and other party candidates.

2011 Nigerian Senate election in Yobe State
Party	Candidate	Votes	%
ANPP	Alkali Abdulkadir Jajere		
PDP	Adamu Garba		
Total votes			
ANPP hold			
