= Wambai Giwa =

Kanoan statesman

Abdullahi Giwa, known as Wambai Giwa, was a Kanoan statesman who held the title of "Wambai" during the reign of Muhammad Nazaki. A man of great wealth and influence, he is remembered by the Kano Chronicle for overseeing the expansion of the Kano walls and for leading Kano's exploits against Katsina through Karaye.

== Life ==
While there was no mention of his background by the Kano Chronicle, the Wambai serves as a senior council to the Kano Sultan and is in most cases reserved for members of the royal family. Giwa is the Hausa word for "Elephant", and is used as an epithet for those who show great might.

Wambai Giwa was noted for his wealth and philanthropy. In trying to ingratiate himself with the Sultan, he was tasked with the expansion of the Kano walls. The Wambai took on the construction of walls from Kofan Dogo to Kofan Gadonḳaia, and from Kofan Dakawuyia to Kofan Kabuga, and to the Kofan Kansakali. This enterprise cost him a thousand calabashes of food and fifty cows daily. After its completion, he slaughtered three hundred cows and gave a thousand thaubs to the laborers, along with generous gifts for the Islamic scholars. When the Sultan returned from war, the Wambai gave him a hundred mailed horses.

As appreciation for the Wambai's projects and generosity, Muhammad Nazaki gave him stewardship of Karaye, a strategic region in Kano's war against Katsina. As chief of Karaye, he led multiple expeditions successful expeditions against Katsina and took much spoil.

Wambai Giwa's influence and reputation led to fears that he would revolt and was turned out of office when El Kutumbi came into power.

=== Folk Song ===
“Elephant Lord of the town,
Abdullah foe of the bull hippopotamus,
whose chains for taking captive women
are hoes and axes.”
“The elephant who reduces his neighbours to servitude.”
