= 2019 Nigerian Senate elections in Yobe State =

The 2019 Nigerian Senate election in Yobe State was held on February 23, 2019, to elect members of the Nigerian Senate to represent Yobe State. Ibrahim Mohammed Bomai representing Yobe South, Ibrahim Gaidam representing Yobe East and Ahmad Lawan representing Yobe North all won on the platform of All Progressives Congress.

== Overview ==
| Affiliation | Party | | Total |
| Affiliation | APC | PDP | Total |
|---|---|---|---|
| Before Election | 2 | 1 | 3 |
| After Election | 3 | 0 | 3 |

== Summary ==
| District | Incumbent | Party | Elected Senator | Party |
|---|---|---|---|---|
| Yobe South | Mohammed Hassan | PDP | Ibrahim Mohammed Bomai | APC |
| Yobe East | Bukar Ibrahim | APC | Ibrahim Gaidam | APC |
| Yobe North | Ahmad Lawan | APC | Ahmad Lawan | APC |

== Results ==
=== Yobe South ===
A total of 7 candidates registered with the Independent National Electoral Commission to contest in the election. APC candidate Ibrahim Mohammed Bomai won the election, defeating PDP Mohammed Hassan and 5 other party candidates.

2019 Nigerian Senate election in Yobe State
| Party | Candidate | Votes | % |
|---|---|---|---|
| APC | Ibrahim Mohammed Bomai | 118,729 | |
| PDP | Mohammed Hassan | 89,049 | |
| Others | | 2,466 | |
| Total votes | | 210,244 | |
| APC gain from PDP | | | |

=== Yobe East ===
A total of 3 candidates registered with the Independent National Electoral Commission to contest in the election. APC candidate Ibrahim Gaidam won the election, defeating PDP Abba Gana Tata and 1 other party candidate.

2019 Nigerian Senate election in Yobe State
| Party | Candidate | Votes | % |
|---|---|---|---|
| APC | Ibrahim Gaidam | 139,277 | |
| PDP | Abba Gana Tata | 18,059 | |
| Others | | 511 | |
| Total votes | | 157,847 | |
| APC hold | | | |

=== Yobe North ===
A total of 4 candidates registered with the Independent National Electoral Commission to contest in the election. APC candidate Ahmad Lawan won the election, defeating PDP Abdullahi Sharif and 2 other party candidates.

2019 Nigerian Senate election in Yobe State
| Party | Candidate | Votes | % |
|---|---|---|---|
| APC | Ahmad Lawan | 144,099 | |
| PDP | Abdullahi Sharif | 53,443 | |
| Others | | 1,284 | |
| Total votes | | 198,826 | |
| APC hold | | | |
