= 2007 Nigerian Senate elections in Yobe State =

2007 Nigerian Senate election in Yobe State

The 2007 Nigerian Senate election in Yobe State was held on 21 April 2007, to elect members of the Nigerian Senate to represent Yobe State. Ahmad Lawan representing Yobe North and Bukar Ibrahim representing Yobe East won on the platform of All Nigeria Peoples Party, while Adamu Garba Talba representing Yobe South won on the platform of the Peoples Democratic Party.

== Overview ==
Affiliation	Party		Total
Affiliation	PDP	ANPP	Total
Before Election			3
After Election	1	2	3

== Summary ==
District	Incumbent	Party	Elected Senator	Party
Yobe North			Ahmad Lawan	ANPP
Yobe East			Bukar Ibrahim	ANPP
Yobe South			Adamu Garba Talba	PDP

== Results ==
=== Yobe North ===
The election was won by Ahmad Lawan of the All Nigeria Peoples Party.

2007 Nigerian Senate election in Yobe State
Party	Candidate	Votes	%
ANPP	Ahmad Lawan		
Total votes			
ANPP hold			

=== Yobe East ===
The election was won by Bukar Ibrahim of the All Nigeria Peoples Party.

2007 Nigerian Senate election in Yobe State
Party	Candidate	Votes	%
ANPP	Bukar Ibrahim		
Total votes			
ANPP hold			

=== Yobe South ===
The election was won by Adamu Garba Talba of the Peoples Democratic Party.

2007 Nigerian Senate election in aww
Party	Candidate	Votes	%
PDP	Adamu Garba Talba		
Total votes			
PDP hold			
