= Ngaji River =

River in Northern Nigeria

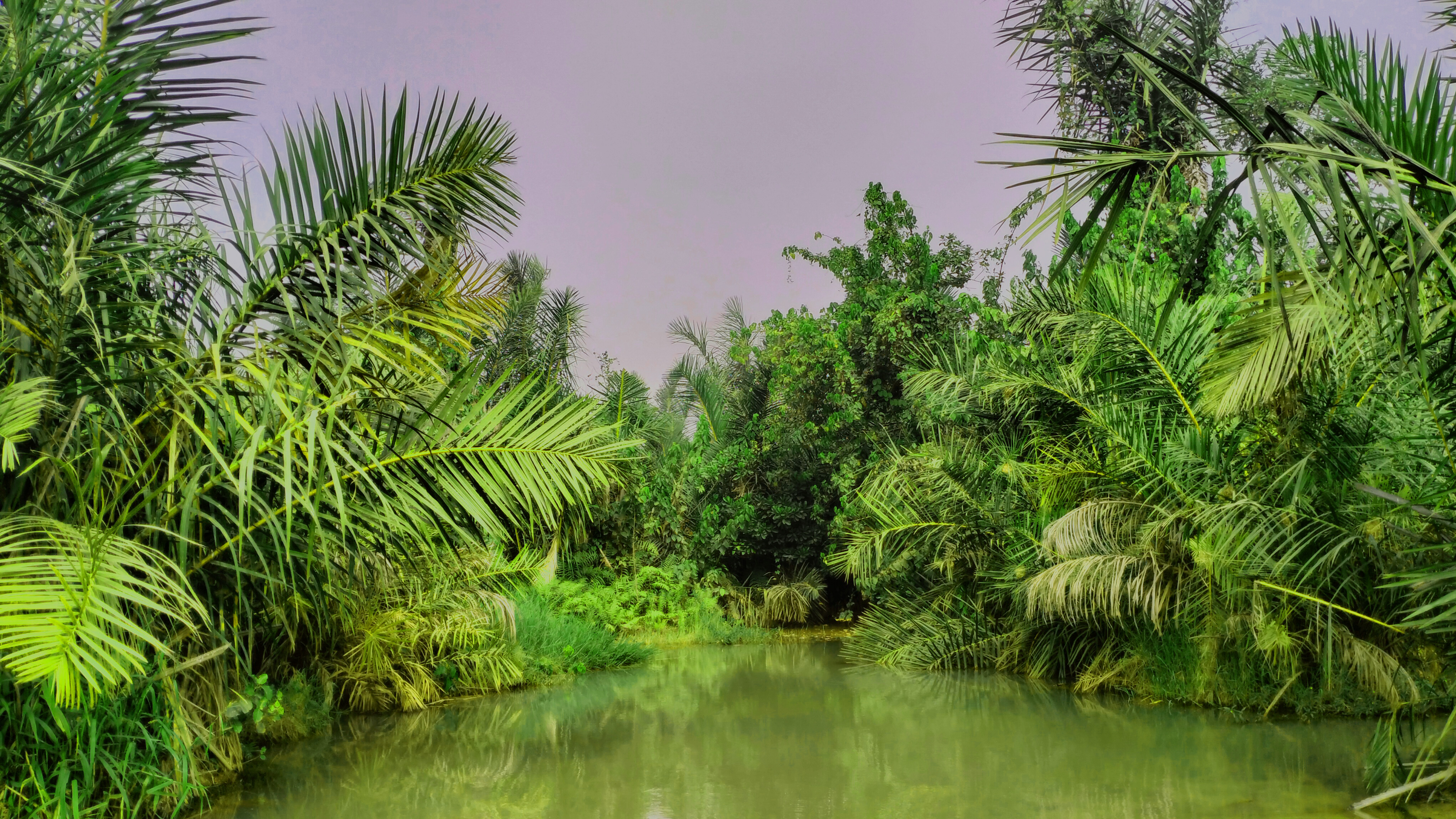
Ngeji River

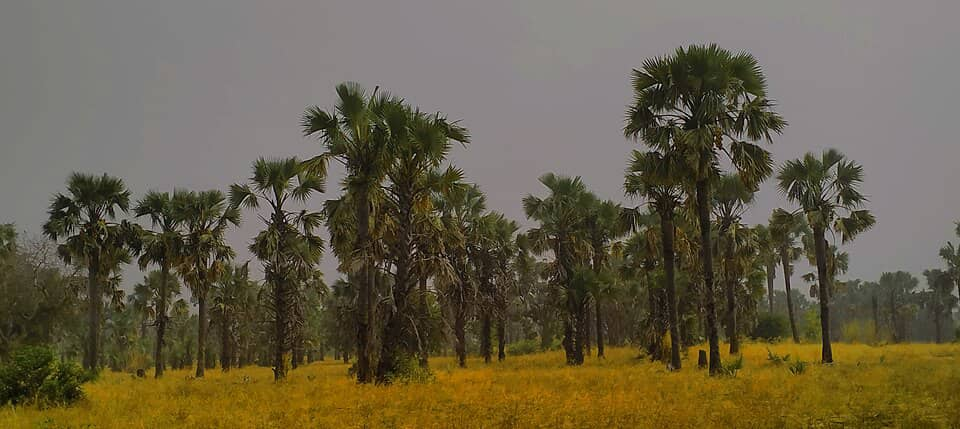
Borassus aethiopum trees inside Ngeji forest.

Ngeji River is a river in the northern part of Nigeria. Originating in the wetland areas of Gadaka town in Yobe State, it runs some 40 kilometres (25 mi) south to Ngalda and where it joins with the Ngalda River about 22.2 kilometres (13.8 mi) south of Fika town.Ngeji stream start from kuli/wafu area in Fika local government area yobe state feeding into Ngalda stream down to dadin kowa in Barno state and drains into river Numan in Adamawa state.

== See also ==
- Yobe River
