= 2015 Nigerian Senate elections in Yobe State =

2015 Nigerian Senate election in Yobe State

The 2015 Nigerian Senate election in Yobe State was held on March 28, 2015, to elect members of the Nigerian Senate to represent Yobe State. Bukar Ibrahim representing Yobe East and Ahmad Lawan representing Yobe North won on the platform of All Progressives Congress, while Mohammed Hasan representing Yobe South won on the platform of Peoples Democratic Party.

== Overview ==
Affiliation	Party		Total
Affiliation	APC	PDP	Total
Before Election			3
After Election	2	1	3

== Summary ==
District	Incumbent	Party	Elected Senator	Party
Yobe East			Bukar Ibrahim	APC
Yobe North			Ahmad Lawan	APC
Yobe South			Mohammed Hasan	PDP

== Results ==
=== Yobe East ===
All Progressives Congress candidate Bukar Ibrahim won the election, defeating People's Democratic Party candidate Abba Gana Tata and other party candidates.

2015 Nigerian Senate election in Yobe State
Party	Candidate	Votes	%
APC	Bukar Ibrahim		
PDP	Abba Gana Tata		
Total votes			
APC hold			

=== Yobe North ===
All Progressives Congress candidate Ahmad Lawan won the election, defeating People's Democratic Party candidate Yerima Lawan and other party candidates.

2015 Nigerian Senate election in Yobe State
Party	Candidate	Votes	%
APC	Ahmad Lawan		
PDP	Yerima Lawan		
Total votes			
APC hold			

=== Yobe South ===
Peoples Democratic Party candidate Mohammed Hasan won the election, defeating All Progressives Congress candidate Alkali Abdulkadir and other party candidates.

2015 Nigerian Senate election in Yobe State
Party	Candidate	Votes	%
PDP	Mohammed Hasan		
APC	Alkali Abdulkadir		
Total votes			
PDP hold			
