= Karaye =

- LGA and town
- Interactive map of Karaye
- Location in Nigeria
- Coordinates: 11°47′N 8°01′E
- Country: Nigeria
- State: Kano State

Area
  - Total: 479 km^{2} (185 sq mi)

Population (2006 census)
  - Total: 141,407
  - Density: 295/km^{2} (765/sq mi)
  - Religions: Islam and Christianity
- Time zone: UTC+1 (WAT)
- 3-digit postal code prefix: 704
- ISO 3166 code: NG.KN.KY

Karaye is a town and Local Government Area and Headquarter of Karaye Emirate Council in Kano State, Nigeria.

It has an area of 479 km^{2} and a population of 141,407 at the 2006 census. It accommodates the National Youth Service Corps (NYSC) orientation camp in Kano State.

Karaye is the home of Challawa Gorge Dam. It is a major reservoir on the Challawa River, a tributary of the Kano River, which is the main tributary of the Hadejia River.

The postal code of the area is 704.

== The People of Karaye ==
The early inhabitants of Kareye were the Maguzawa, who ritualized under trees. The second settlers in the area are Hausa, Fulani, Kanuri, and other Nigeria. All the people live peacefully with one another and perform their daily activities without interference.

== Climate/Geography ==
Karaye experiences a stifling wet season that is primarily cloudy, a partially cloudy dry season, and year-round heat. It rarely drops below 49 °F or rises over 105 °F throughout the year, with average temperatures ranging from 54°F to 100 °F. With daily high temperatures averaging above 97 °F, the hot season spans 2.0 months, from March 14 to May 15. Typically reaching a high of 99 °F and a low of 72 °F, April is the warmest month in Karaye. With an average daily maximum temperature below 88 °F, the chilly season spans 1.9 months, from November 29 to January 27. January is the coldest month of the year in Karaye, with an average low temperature of 55 °F and high temperature of 86 °F. Karaye's climate is classified as subtropical steppe (BSh). The district experiences 30.6°C (87.08 °F) annually, which is 1.14% warmer than the average for Nigeria. Karaye experiences 62.68 wet days (17.17% of the total) and 49.56 millimetres (1.95 inches) of precipitation on average each year.

Karaye Local Government Area has an average temperature of 33 degrees Celsius or 91 degrees Fahrenheit and a total area of 479 square kilometres (185 square miles). The Local Government Area's average wind speed is reported to be 10 km/h or 6.2 mph, while the area's average humidity is 29%.

== Religion ==
The two main religions practice in Karaye are Islam and Christianity.

== Economy ==
Karaye Local Government Area's economy heavily relies on trade, as evidenced by the numerous markets in the area, including Kasuwar Maciyo Market, where locals go to exchange a range of goods and services. A variety of domestic animals, including goats, horses, and cows, are raised and sold in Karaye Local Government Area. Sorghum, millet, beans, rice, and other crops are grown in the Karaye Local Government Area, making farming another significant aspect of the region.

== Karaye Local Government Area's District ==
- Daura
- Karaye
- Kwanyawa
- Kurugu
- Kafin Dagga
- Tudun Kaya
- Turawa
- Unguwar Hajji
- Yammedi
