= Federal Medical Centre, Nguru =

Federal Medical Centre in Nigeria

Geography
- Location: Nguru, Yobe State, Nigeria

Links
- Lists: Hospitals in Nigeria

Federal Medical Centre, Nguru is a federal government of Nigeria medical centre located in Nguru, Yobe State, Nigeria.It was established in the year 1954 by the Western Sudan as a basic hospital in Nguru town consistently mainly Male and Female Ward, it was later upgraded to hospital in the year 1999. The current medical director is Professor Hadiza Usman..

== MD ==
The current medical director is Professor Hadiza Usman.

== Services ==
The Centre provides a wide range of healthcare services, including disease prevention, diagnosis, treatment, and rehabilitation. These services are offered through various clinical and support departments and are delivered by healthcare professionals from different fields. In addition to patient care, the Centre contributes to the training of healthcare workers and supports research activities in the health sector
