= Karaye Emirate =

Nigerian Emirate council

Karaye Emirate is a second-class Emirate council in Kano State with its headquarters in Karaye town.

== History ==
Karaye town is the headquarters of the Karaye emirate and is located west of Kano city. Even before the arrival of Bagauda in 999, Magunguna settled in Karaye. The town of Karaye was founded in 1085. From 1101 to 1793, the kings of Habe ruled Karaye. During the time of the Habe rulers, the Karaye emirate expanded to include the Western and Northern areas of the current Kano State.

=== Relations with Kano ===
When the House of Bagauda was ruling in Kano, they asked for cooperation with their neighbor Karaye Emirate in order to unite their forces in order to protect themselves from other emirates like Zazzau, Katsina and Sokoto. Karaye agreed to cooperate with the House of Bagauda where Karaye returned to the Kingdom of Kano. From the time Karaye was under the Kano Kingdom until the arrival of the Fulani Kings after the Usman Dan Fodio's Jihad.

=== Establishment as a first-class emirate ===
The Karaye Emirates continued to be under the Kingdom of Kano until 2020 when the Kano State Government issued five more new emirates and changed the structure of the emirate of Kano. At that time the Kano government brought back the new Emirate of Karaye. The Karaye Emirate consisted of eight local government areas of Kano State, Karaye, Rogo, Gwarzo, Kabo, Rimin Gado, Madobi, Kiru and Shanono.

=== Dissolution and re-establishment ===
On May 23, 2024, Kano State Governor Abba Kabir Yusuf abolished the Karaye Emirate and four other emirates created in 2019 by former Governor Abdullahi Umar Ganduje. This restored Kano State to a single emirate structure. Sanusi Lamido Sanusi II was installed as the Emir of Kano, leading the re-unified Kano Emirate. This move aimed to reinforce the historical and administrative coherence of Kano's traditional system.

In July of 2024, Karaye Emirate was re-established as a second-class emirate under the authority of the Kano Emirate. Karaye consists of the Karaye and Rogo local government areas.

== Emirs ==
- Alhaji Dr. Ibrahim Abubakar II (May 2020 - May 2024)
- Muhammad Mahraz (July 2024 - present)
