= Tiga Dam =

Nigeria Water Dam

Coordinates: 11°26′14″N 8°24′9″E

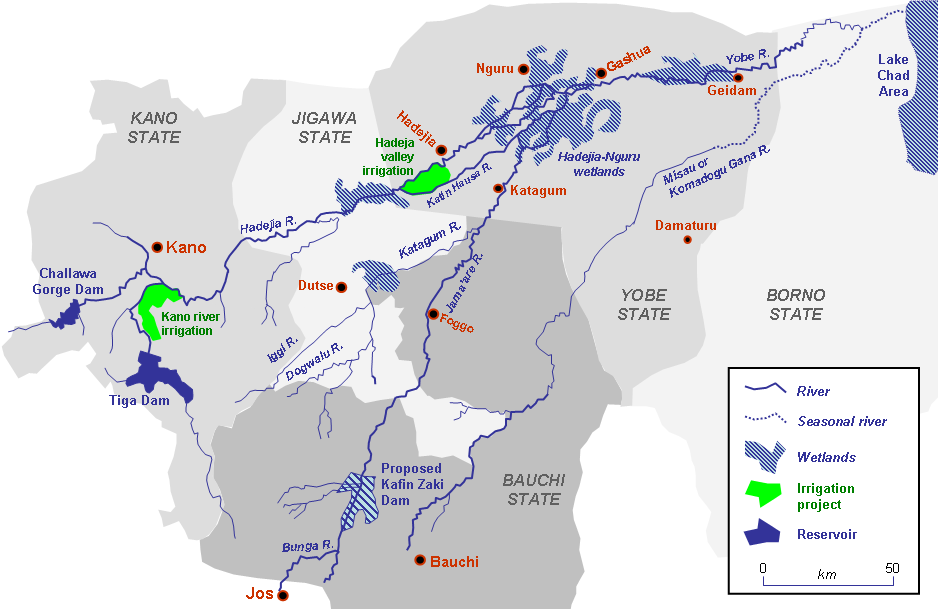
Catchment area of the Yobe River – Tiga dam to the west, south of Kano

The Tiga Dam is located in southern part of Kano State in the Northwest of Nigeria, constructed in 1971–1974. It is a major reservoir on the Kano River, the main tributary of the Hadejia River. The dam was built during the administration of Governor Audu Bako in an attempt to improve food security through irrigation projects.

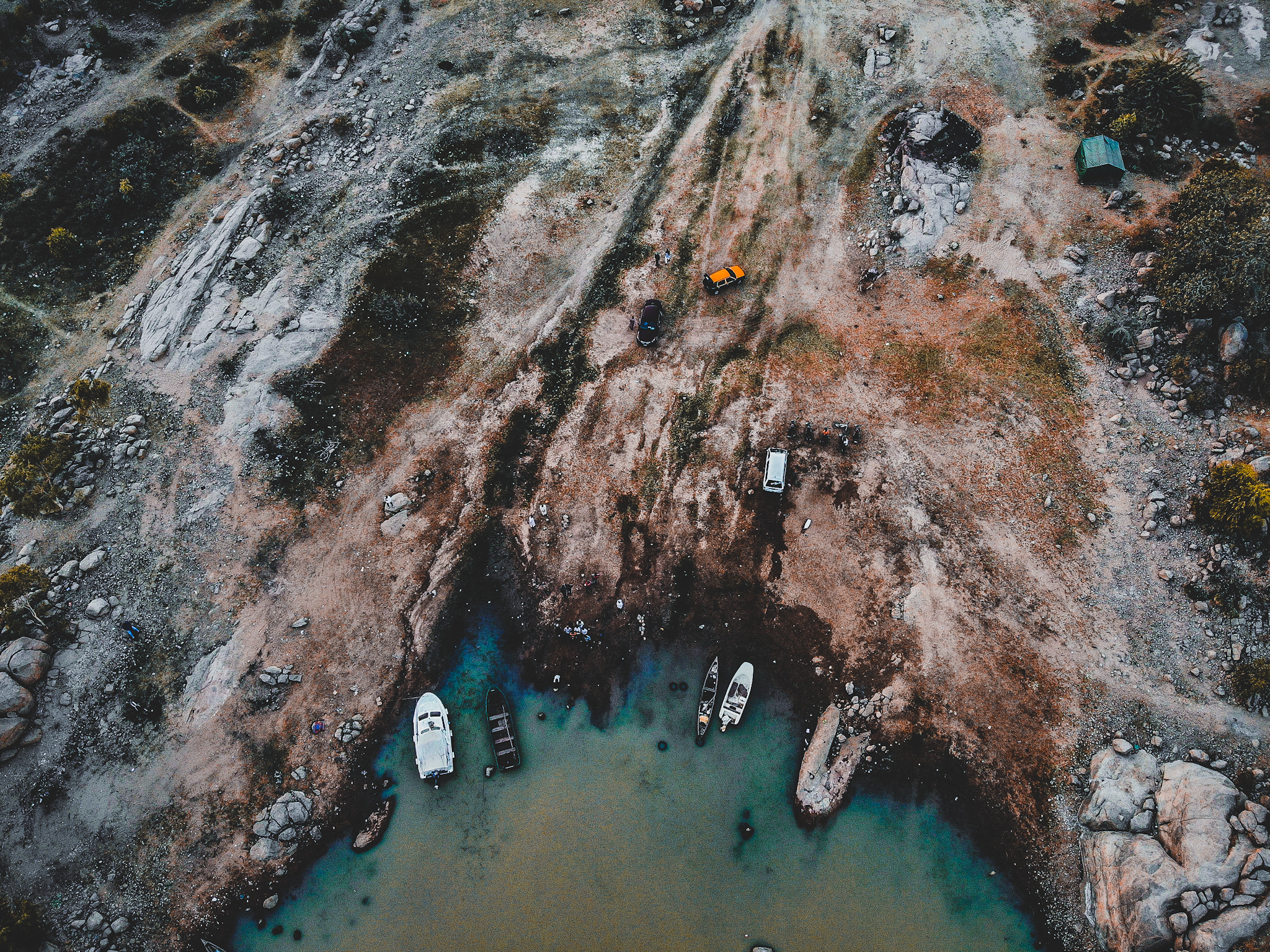
Tiga Dam

== Description ==
The dam was built during the administration of Governor Audu Bako in an attempt to respond threat of recurrent drought and to improve food security through irrigation projects. The dam covers an area of 178 square kilometres (69 sq mi) with maximum capacity of nearly 2,000,000,000 cubic metres (7.1×10^{10} ft^{3}). Water from the dam supplies the Kano River Irrigation Project as well as Kano City.

== Downstream impact ==
Several studies have shown that the dam has delivered negative economic value when its effect on downstream communities was taken into account. On completion of the dam the river flow downstream at Gashua in Yobe State fell by about 100,000,000 cubic metres (3.5×10^{9} ft^{3}) per year due to upstream irrigation and by more than 50,000,000 cubic metres (1.8×10^{9} ft^{3}) due to evaporation from the reservoir. A study published in 1999 concluded that farmers in the downstream floodplain had adapted their agriculture, helped by new technology, but the increased level of production might not be sustainable.

The Hadejia-Nguru wetlands further downstream have considerable economic and ecological importance. They are home to about one million people living by wet-season rice farming, agriculture at other seasons, fishing and cattle grazing by Fulani people. The dam has damaged the cycle, reducing fish catches and harvests of other wetland products.

In August 2009, Senator Ahmed Ibrahim Lawan of Yobe North, Chairman of the Senate Committee on Public Accounts, stated that the Tiga Dam had reduced water flow in the Kano River by about 50%. The senator was speaking in opposition to the proposed Kafin Zaki Dam on the Jama'are River, the other main tributary of the Yobe River. He said the Tiga and Challawa Dams had caused intense poverty, increased desert encroachment, migration and conflicts between arable farmers and herdsmen. He noted that the Yobe River no longer flows into Lake Chad.

It is estimated that Lake Chad will dry up completely within 40 years. More than 30 million people derive their livelihood from the Lake Chad Basin through fishing, raising live stock and farming. A study group to examine the problem was established in November 2008, visiting the Tiga dam and other locations.

== Tourism ==
Tiga Dam attracts tourists due to its scenic beauty and the recreational activities it offers. Visitors can enjoy boating, fishing, and picnic spots along the reservoir. The surrounding area is also known for its diverse wildlife and offers opportunities for bird watching and nature photography.

== 2021 temporary closure ==
On November 1, 2021, the dam was closed for repairs as part of Transforming Irrigation Management in Nigeria (TRIMING), a World Bank funded Project for the rehabilitation of the Kano River Irrigation Schemes (KRIS) and Hadejia Valley Irrigation Scheme (HVIS). The dam was reopended in April 2022 by Hadejia Jama’are River Basin Development Authority (HJRBDA). It was not the first time the dam was being closed.
