= Ngalda River =

River in Nigeria

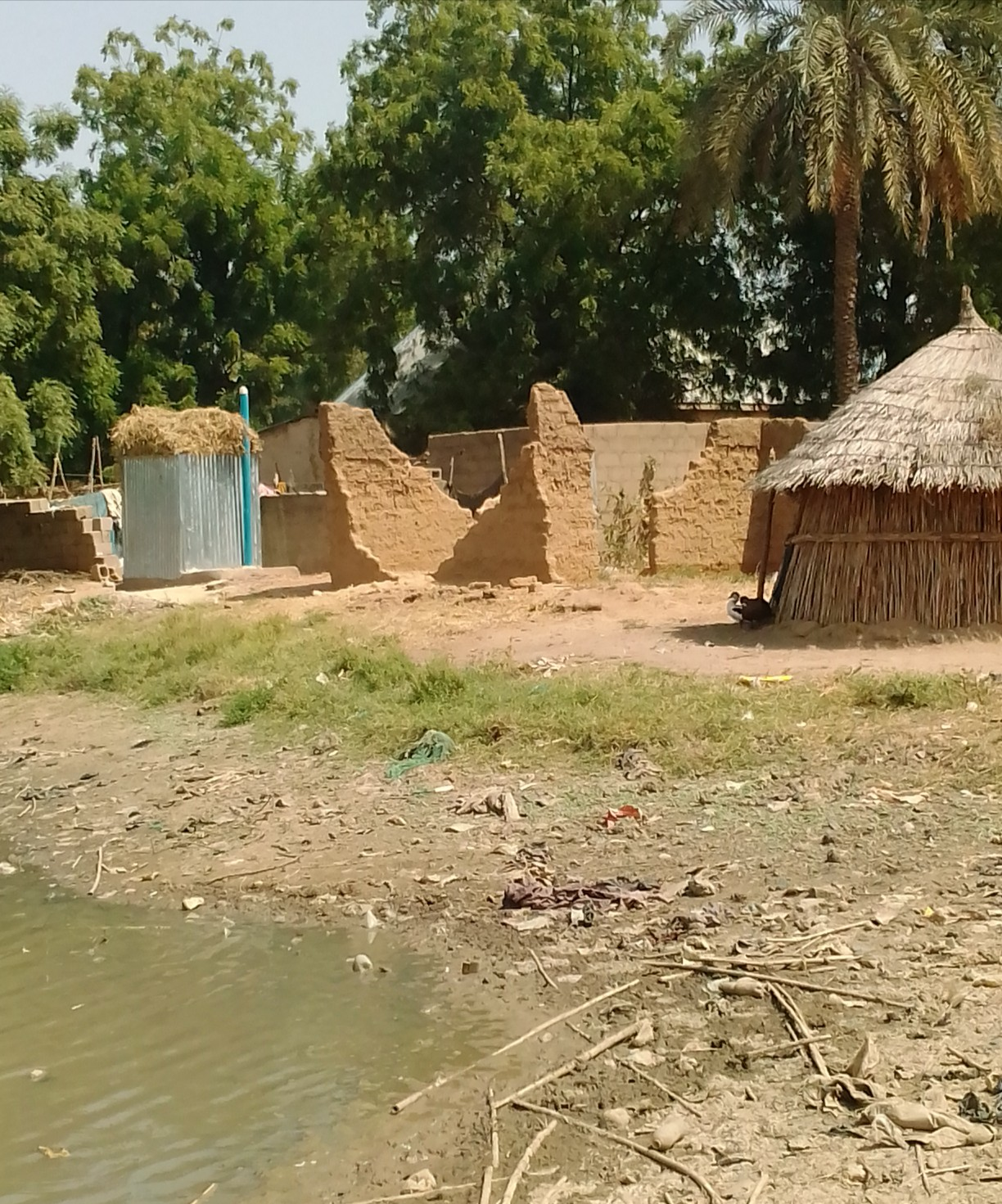

- Location in Nigeria

Location
- Country: Nigeria
- State: Yobe State
- Local government area: Fika

Physical characteristics
- Source
  - location: Ngalda, Yobe State, Nigeria
- Mouth: Ngaji River
  - location: Northern Nigeria

Ngalda River is a river in Nigeria that has its source in the commercial town of Ngalda community, in Fika local government area of Yobe State. The Ngalda is also connected with Ngaji River about 40 kilometres (25 mi) to the north. The 2022 flooding from the river has made over 1000 people homeless.
