= Alkali Abdulkadir Jajere =

Nigerian politician

Senator for Yobe South
- Incumbent
- Assumed office June 2011
- Preceded by: Adamu Garba Talba

Personal details
- Born: 15 October 1964 (age 61)
- Party: All Nigeria People's Party (ANPP)

Alkali Abdulkadir Jajere (born 15 October 1964) is a Nigerian journalist turned politician who was elected to the Senate for the Yobe South constituency of Yobe State, Nigeria in the April 2011 national elections. He was elected on the All Nigeria People's Party (ANPP) platform.

== Early political career ==
Jajere entered politics in 2007 and was appointed Commissioner of Agriculture and then Commissioner of Works in the government in Yobe State. While he was commissioner of Agriculture, farms were established across the state, boosting food production and creating jobs. 12,000 farmers were employed in production of castor seeds for export under the state castor oil production programme. 700 tractors were successfully procured and allocated to farmers. In June 2008 he was engaged in a dispute with the federal government over delivery and payment for grains allocated to the state. Jajere accused the government of using late delivery to tarnish the image of the ANPP state government, while the Federal Minister of State accused Yobe State of failure to pay for the grains. During his tenure as Commissioner of works about 700 kilometers of roads were completed.

== Senatorial career ==
Jajere was elected as Yobe South Senatorial candidate for the ANPP. He promised to gain funding from Abuja for projects in the state, to provide jobs and the resolve land tenure issues. In April 2011 he was elected with 96,645 votes. The runner-up, the incumbent Senator Adamu Garba Talba of the People's Democratic Party (PDP), won 79,891 votes.
