= Ibrahim Mohammed Bomai =

Nigerian senator (born 1960)

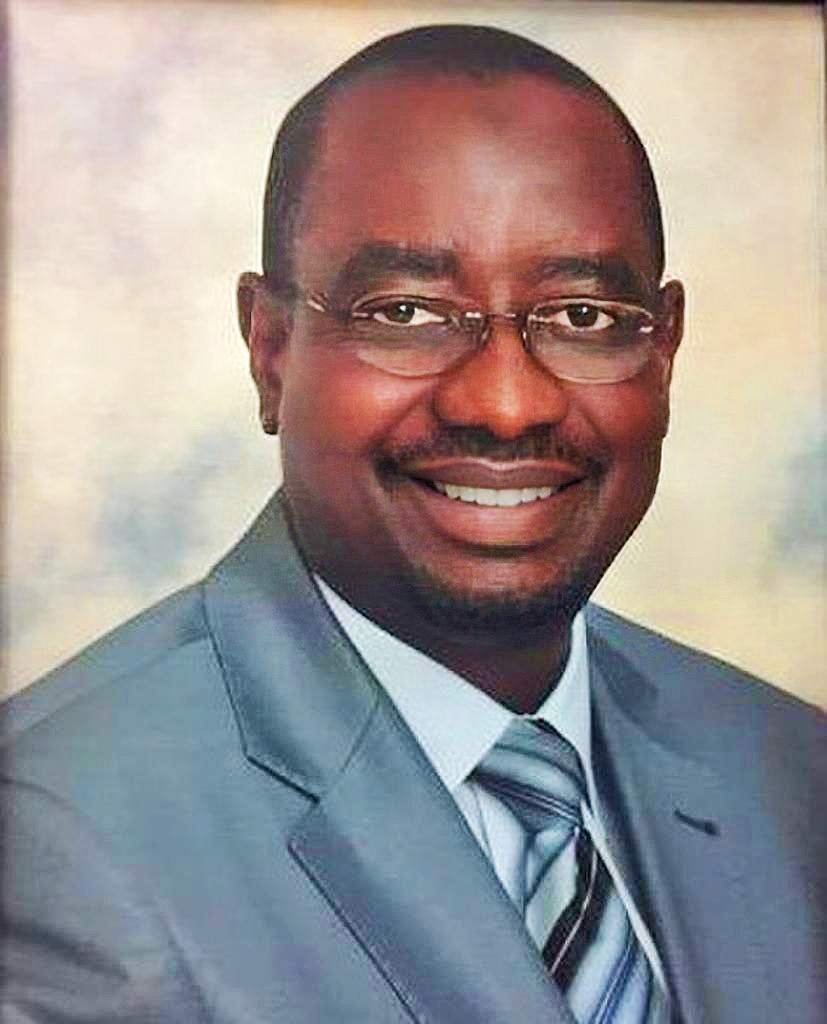

Senator for Yobe South
- Incumbent
- Assumed office 11 June 2019
- Preceded by: Mohammed Hassan

Personal details
- Born: 10 February 1960 (age 66) Maiduguri, Borno State, Nigeria
- Party: All Progressives Congress (APC)
- Education: Abubakar Tafawa Balewa University Bauchi, Kaduna Polytechnic.

Ibrahim Mohammed Bomai (born 10 February 1960) is a Nigerian politician. He currently serves as the Senator representing Yobe South Senatorial District in the 10th National Assembly. He was initially elected in 2019 and was reelected in the 2023 Yobe South Senatorial District Election.

== Early life and education ==
Ibrahim Mohammed Bomai was born in Maiduguri, capital of Borno State on 10 February 1960 to the family of Mohammed Bomai and Hafsat Bomai. He started his Primary Education at Argungu when his father was under the defunct Northern Nigeria Government and completed it in 1972 at the prestigious Shehu Garbai Primary School in Maiduguri. He obtained his Secondary School leaving certificate in 1977 from the Government College, Maiduguri. He received a Diploma in Accountancy in 1980, Higher National Diploma in Accountancy (1982) both from the Kaduna Polytechnic, Kaduna. He received a Masters Degree in Business Administration (Finance) in 1999 from the Abubakar Tafawa Balewa University, Bauchi from 1997 to 1999. He also studied at Harvard University, Cambridge, Boston, United States between 2004 and 2006 and at the London School of Management, London, U.K in 2005. Bomai is a Fellow of the Association of National Accountants of Nigeria, 1994, Fellow, the Chartered Institute of Taxation of Nigeria, 2000, Fellow Chartered Institute of Treasury Management of Nigeria, 2012 and Fellow, Institute of Corporate Administration of Nigeria, 2012. .

== Career ==
Bomai's work experience began with his appointment as a lecturer, College of Education, Nsugbe, Anambra State during his mandatory national service (NYSC) between 1982 and 1983. Thereafter, he gained employment as a Finance Officer with BOADAP, Maiduguri in 1983. In 1985, he left BOADAP and joined the services of Ramat Polytechnic, Maiduguri as a Senior Accountant. In 1986, he was promoted to Principal Accountant and Acting Bursar, Ramat Polytechnic, Maiduguri. He switched over to the Federal service in 1988 as Assistant Chief Accountant and Acting Bursar, Federal College of Education (Technical), Potiskum, Yobe State. He was confirmed as the substantive Bursar of the institution and held the strategic post till 2002 when he moved over to the nation's capital, Abuja as the assistant director (Accounts), office of the Accountant-General of the Federation. He was subsequently posted to Ministry of Federal Capital Territory (MFCT), Abuja. Between 2005 and 2008, he served as deputy director (Accounts) Office of the Accountant-General of the Federation on posting to the Federal Capital Territory Administration (FCTA). Within the period, he served as the Auditor-General for the FCT area councils under the FCTA. Bomai was promoted to the position of Director of Treasury of the Federal Capital Territory Administration in 2008, a pivotal post in the FCTA which he held until he retired from the civil service in August 2016.

== Senate of Nigeria ==
Ibrahim Mohammed Bomai was elected on the nineteenth of February 2019 as the senator representing Yobe South Senatorial District. On 25 February 2023, he was reelected as a senator to serve in the 10th Senate. However, the election was declared inconclusive, and a supplementary poll on 15 April 2023, took place, during which he was declared the winner and was returned as elected.

== Constituency Project controversy ==
While on a standard review of constituency projects in September 2021, the Independent Corrupt Practices Commission found that issues with Bomai's projects. First, a borehole supposed to have been dug in the Sabongari area of Nangere LGA was never dug while other boreholes were dug in the wrong communities or with substandard generators. The other project that the ICPC inspection team flagged was a missing generator that had been stolen from the college it was given to. The inspection team leader ordered the contractor to fix the borehole issues and said the commission would work for the return of the stolen generator.

However, Senator Ibrahim Mohammed Bomai later clarified that the borehole projects were awarded by the Federal Ministry of Works, not facilitated by him, and that any issues were the responsibility of the contractor. He also stated that the transformer supplied to CAMTECH Potiskum was duly delivered, and that subsequent adjustments were matters between the institution and the Yobe State Rural Electrification Board.
