= Haddad people =

The Haddad (also known as the Danoa) are a Sahelian Muslim ethnic group found through Nigeria, Chad and Sudan. They live in the midst of other peoples and do not have their own language but speak the language of the surrounding community. The traditional employment of the community has always been blacksmithry.

They live segregated, generally without any land or water rights. They are strictly endogamous. Haddad members, because of the decline of their monopoly of blacksmithry caused by importation, have started migrating to the Sudanese towns, living beside other ethnic groups.
