= Zakariyau Galadima =

Nigerian politician

Zakariyau Galadima is a Nigerian politician and a member of the Nigerian National Assembly Delegation from Yobe State. He represented Bade/Jakusko constituency at the 6th National Assembly (2007–2011) and at the 9th National Assembly (Nigeria).

Zakariyau rode on the platform of the All Nigerian Peoples Party (ANPP) to the 6th National Assembly and on the platform of the All Progressive Congress (APC) to the 9th National Assembly.
