= Nguru, Nigeria =

Nguru
- Town and LGA
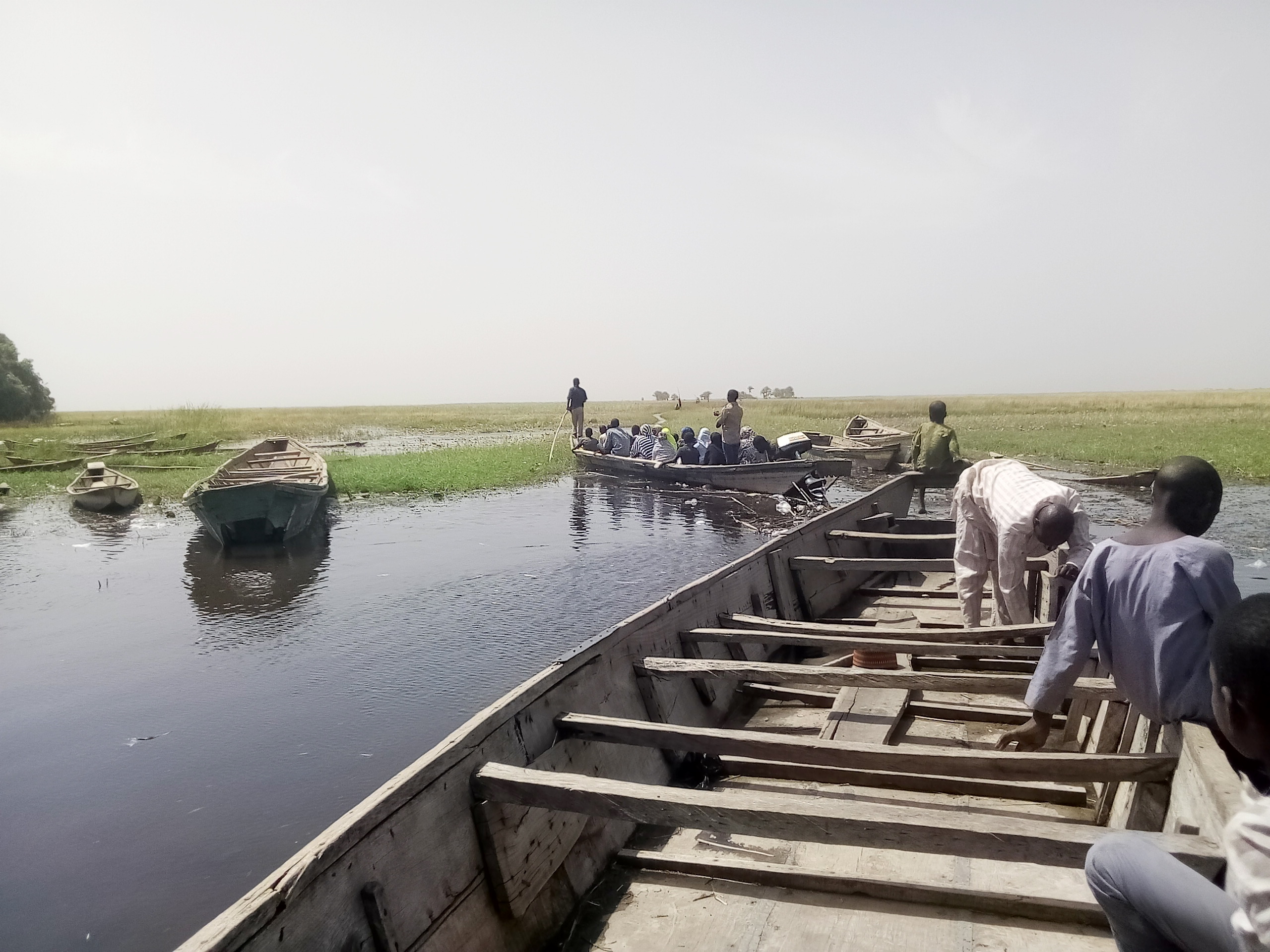
- Nguru River Bank, Yobe State
- Interactive map of Nguru
- Location in Nigeria
- Coordinates: 12°52′45″N 10°27′09″E
- Country: Nigeria
- State: Yobe State

Government
  - Local Government Chairman: Hon.Muhammad Ahmed Mairami

Area
  - Total: 916 km^{2} (354 sq mi)

Population (2006 census)
  - Total: 270,632
  - Density: 295/km^{2} (765/sq mi)
- Time zone: UTC+1 (WAT)
- 3-digit postal code prefix: 630
- ISO 3166 code: NG.YO.NG

Nguru (or N'Gourou) is a town and Local Government Area near the Hadejia River in Yobe State, Nigeria.

It has an area of 916 km^{2} and a population of 270,632.

The postal code of the area is 630.

The town probably dates from around the 15th century. There is a variety of landscape types in the area, including the protected Hadejia-Nguru wetlands of Nguru Lake, and the "Sand Dunes", a semi-desert area.

== Climate ==
Climate data for Nguru (1991–2020)
| Month | Jan | Feb | Mar | Apr | May | Jun | Jul | Aug | Sep | Oct | Nov | Dec | Year |
|---|---|---|---|---|---|---|---|---|---|---|---|---|---|
| Record high °C (°F) | 40.0 (104.0) | 42.1 (107.8) | 46.6 (115.9) | 44.4 (111.9) | 44.5 (112.1) | 47.5 (117.5) | 41.9 (107.4) | 39.2 (102.6) | 39.8 (103.6) | 41.5 (106.7) | 41.4 (106.5) | 40.5 (104.9) | 47.5 (117.5) |
| Mean daily maximum °C (°F) | 30.6 (87.1) | 34.0 (93.2) | 38.1 (100.6) | 40.8 (105.4) | 40.4 (104.7) | 38.1 (100.6) | 34.3 (93.7) | 32.2 (90.0) | 34.4 (93.9) | 36.7 (98.1) | 35.3 (95.5) | 31.4 (88.5) | 35.5 (95.9) |
| Daily mean °C (°F) | 22.2 (72.0) | 25.3 (77.5) | 29.5 (85.1) | 32.5 (90.5) | 33.0 (91.4) | 31.6 (88.9) | 29.0 (84.2) | 27.3 (81.1) | 28.9 (84.0) | 29.4 (84.9) | 26.9 (80.4) | 23.3 (73.9) | 28.2 (82.8) |
| Mean daily minimum °C (°F) | 13.9 (57.0) | 16.6 (61.9) | 20.9 (69.6) | 24.3 (75.7) | 25.6 (78.1) | 25.1 (77.2) | 23.6 (74.5) | 22.4 (72.3) | 23.3 (73.9) | 22.2 (72.0) | 18.4 (65.1) | 15.1 (59.2) | 21.0 (69.8) |
| Record low °C (°F) | 5.0 (41.0) | 6.0 (42.8) | 8.0 (46.4) | 12.0 (53.6) | 15.0 (59.0) | 15.9 (60.6) | 16.0 (60.8) | 14.0 (57.2) | 15.0 (59.0) | 9.8 (49.6) | 10.0 (50.0) | 5.0 (41.0) | 5.0 (41.0) |
| Average precipitation mm (inches) | 0.0 (0.0) | 0.0 (0.0) | 0.0 (0.0) | 2.8 (0.11) | 15.1 (0.59) | 55.6 (2.19) | 150.8 (5.94) | 204.1 (8.04) | 84.2 (3.31) | 10.5 (0.41) | 0.0 (0.0) | 0.0 (0.0) | 523.1 (20.59) |
| Average precipitation days (≥ 1.0 mm) | 0.0 | 0.0 | 0.0 | 0.3 | 1.8 | 3.9 | 7.8 | 10.4 | 5.9 | 1.4 | 0.0 | 0.0 | 31.5 |
| Average relative humidity (%) | 18.9 | 14.5 | 12.4 | 17.1 | 29.8 | 44.4 | 59.4 | 74.1 | 70.2 | 44.7 | 24.0 | 21.6 | 35.9 |
Source 1: NOAA
Source 2: Deutscher Wetterdienst (extremes)

== Transport ==
Nguru is the terminus of the Western Railway of Nigeria.

== See also ==
- List of Local Government Areas in Yobe State
- Railway stations in Nigeria
- Federal Medical Centre, Nguru
