= Adamu Garba Talba =

Nigerian politician

Senator of the Federal Republic of Nigeria from Yobe State South District
- In office 29 May 2007 – May 2011
- Preceded by: Mamman Bello Ali
- Succeeded by: Alkali Abdulkadir Jajere

Personal details
- Born: 15 August 1952 (age 74) Yobe State, Nigeria
- Died: July 14, 2025
- Party: Peoples Democratic Party

Adamu Garba Talba (15 August 1952 – 14 July 2025) was a Nigerian politician and senator in the 6th National Assembly. He was a native of Karai-Karai born in Nangere, Yobe State. He was elected Senator for the Yobe South constituency of Yobe State, Nigeria, taking office on 29 May 2007.

== Education ==
Talba gained a diploma in Public Administration and entered the Yobe State Civil Service. He was twice elected council Chairman of Nangere Local Government Council in Yobe State. He was appointed chairman of the Board of Management, Federal Medical Centre, Alare, Director of NNDC, Kaduna and Commissioner of Health for Yobe State.

== Career and achievements ==
As Senator, in September 2008, Talba advocated establishment of a National Desert Commission to tackle desert encroachment in the northern part of the country. He was a vocal critic of Yobe State Governor Ibrahim Geidam, accusing him of squandering money. He called for investigation of contracts awarded to BECCON Nigeria, an N4 billion award for construction of the Kaliyari-Baimari road, N2.3 billion for construction of the Damaturu water works and N1.3 billion for unspecified renovations to secondary schools.

== Politics ==
In December 2009, Talba said that the democratic process was working normally, and criticized recent moves by opposition politicians to form a "mega party" in opposition to the Peoples Democratic Party (PDP). He said they should join the mainstream of either the PDP or the ANPP (All Nigeria Peoples Party). In March 2010 he denied a media report that former Yobe Central Senator Usman Albishir, who had recently decamped from the ANPP to the PDP, would automatically get a ticket from the party to contest the 2011 governorship election. He added that with Albishir's move the ANPP would be history in Yobe.
