= Hadejia-Nguru wetlands =

Wetland in northern Nigeria

Coordinates: 12°39′0″N 10°35′30″E

Designations

Ramsar Wetland
- Official name: Nguru Lake (and Marma Channel) complex
- Designated: 2 October 2000
- Reference no.: 1039

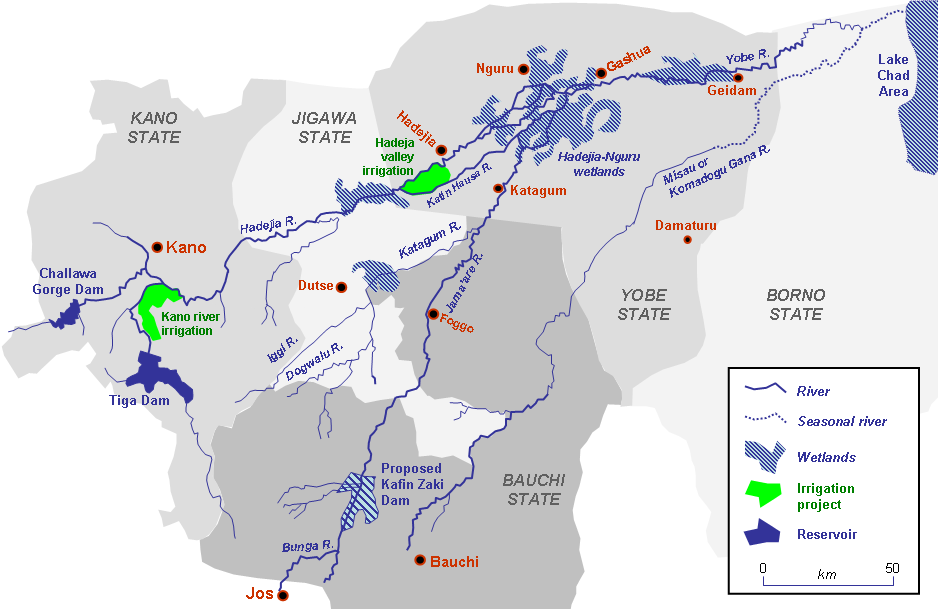
Yobe River catchment area showing location of the Hadejia-Nguru wetlands

The Hadejia-Nguru wetlands in Yobe State in northern Nigeria, which include Nguru Lake, are ecologically and economically important. They are threatened by reduced rainfall in recent years, a growing population and upstream dam construction.

== Geography ==
The wetlands lie in the Yobe-Komadugu sub-basin of the Chad Basin. They are formed where the Hadejia and Jama'are rivers meet lines of ancient sand dunes in a northeast–southwest alignment and break into numerous channels. They are drained by the Yobe River, which flows east towards Lake Chad. They lie between the Sudanian Savanna to the south and the drier Sahel to the north. Some of the land is permanently flooded, while other parts are flooded only in the wet season (August and September). Annual rainfall ranges between 200 and 600 mm, during the period late May–September. At one time the wetlands may have covered up to 3,000 km^{2}. Between 1964 and 1971 over 2,000 km^{2} were flooded. By 1983 less than 900 km^{2} were flooded, and less than 300 km^{2} were flooded in the drought year of 1984.

== Ecology ==
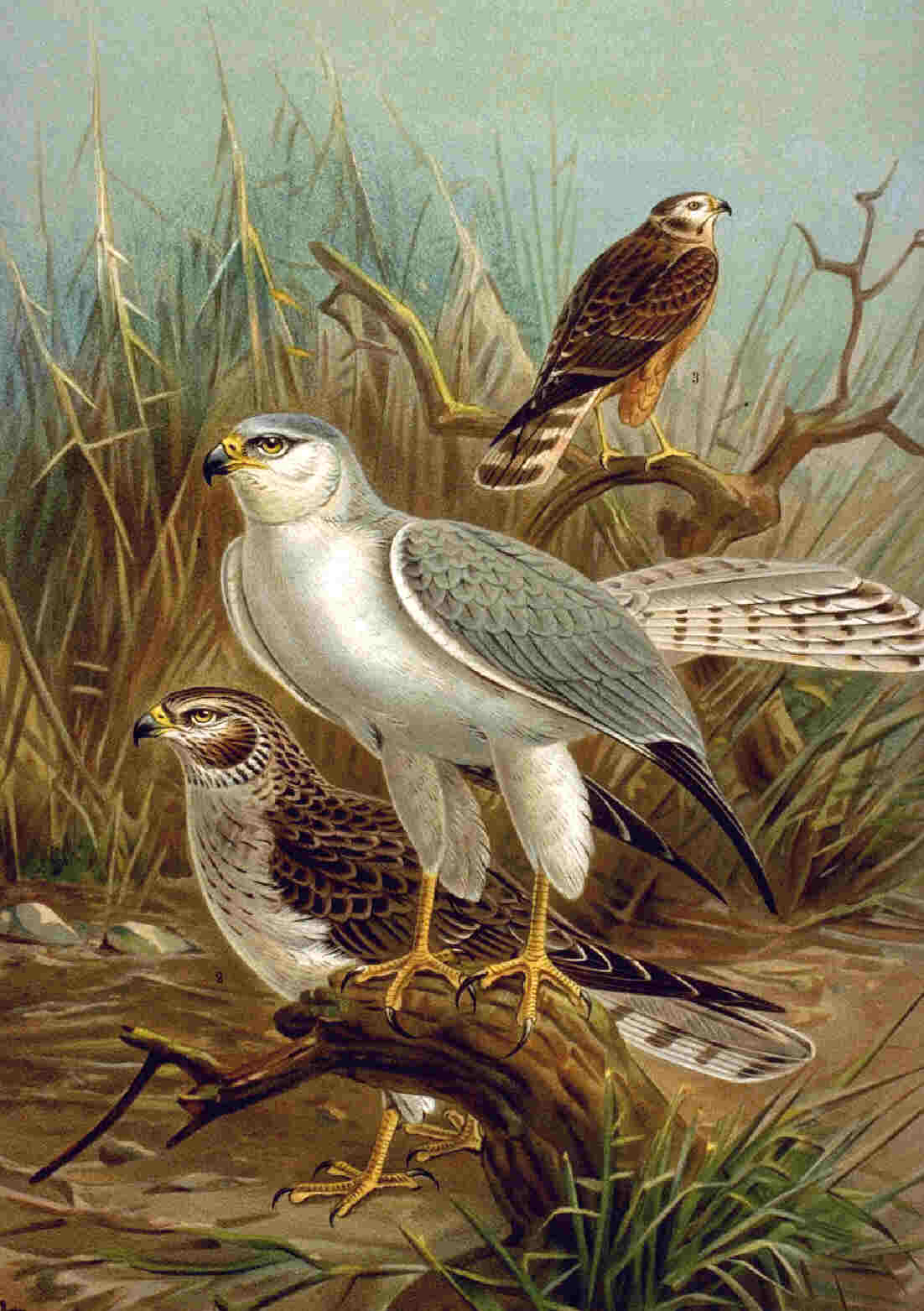
pallid harrier illustrated by Johann Friedrich Naumann

The Hadejia-Nguru wetlands are on the List of Ramsar wetlands of international importance. Nguru Lake and the Marma Channel complex (58,100 ha [224 sq mi]) are designated a Ramsar Site. The wetlands are important for waterbirds, both for breeding species and for wintering and passage Palearctic waterbirds. The estimated waterbird population varies between 200,000 and 325,000. 377 bird species have been seen in the wetlands, including occasional sightings of the near-threatened pallid harrier and great snipe species.

The Bade-Nguru Wetlands sector of the Chad Basin National Park covers 938 km^{2} of the wetlands. Parts of the wetlands are protected by five Forest Reserves, a Wildlife Sanctuary and a Ramsar Site. With reduced flooding and increasing population, the environment is degrading and there is growing competition between humans and wildlife. Farmers set out poison to kill the crop-destroying Quelea quelea, in the process killing non-target species. Marginal land is now coming under cultivation and tree cover in the forest reserves is being depleted.

== Economy ==
The area supports about 1.5 million farmers, herders and fishermen. The wetlands support wet-season rice farming, flood-recession agriculture and dry-season farming using irrigation. Crops include peppers and wheat. The wetlands support fishermen, who often also farm, and provide fuel wood and leaves used for making mats and ropes. The lands are also grazed by Fulani cattle.

== Issues ==
The wetlands have suffered from increasingly severe droughts in recent years. Since the 1980s, the use of small gasoline-powered irrigation pumps has increased the land that can be used for farming, causing conflicts with the cattle herders and disputes over land ownership.

Dams have threatened the viability of the wetlands, particularly the Tiga Dam and the Challawa Gorge Dam, which now control most of the water flow in the Hadejia river and have reduced seasonal flooding and overall water supply. It is estimated that the Tiga dam on the Kano river has reduced flooding by about 350 km^{2}. A dam was built on the Hadejia river just upstream from the wetlands for irrigation purposes, completed in 1972, which has also affected flooding. The proposed Kafin Zaki Dam on the Jama'are river could pose a further threat. Due to these changes, large areas of farming and grazing land and important fish ponds have either dried up along channels blocked by invasive Typha grass, or have been flooded.

== See also ==
- Hadejia River
