= Challawa Gorge Dam =

Dam in northwest Nigeria

Coordinates: 11°44′34″N 8°1′2″E

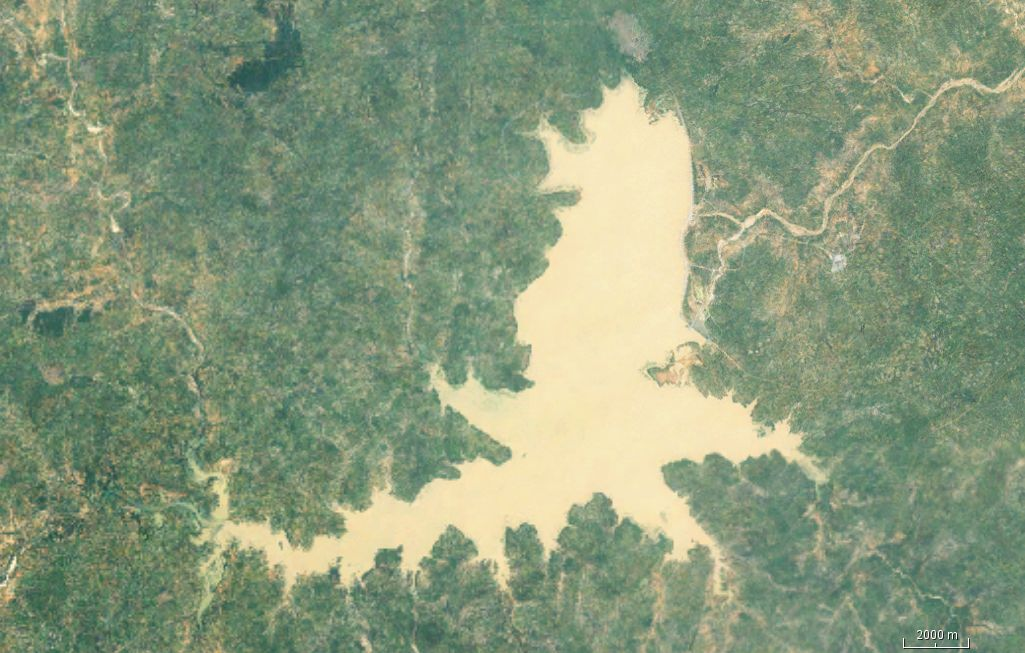
- Interactive map of Challawa Gorge Dam
- Country: Nigeria
- Construction began: 1990
- Opening date: 1992; 34 years ago
- Built by: Julius Berger Nigeria

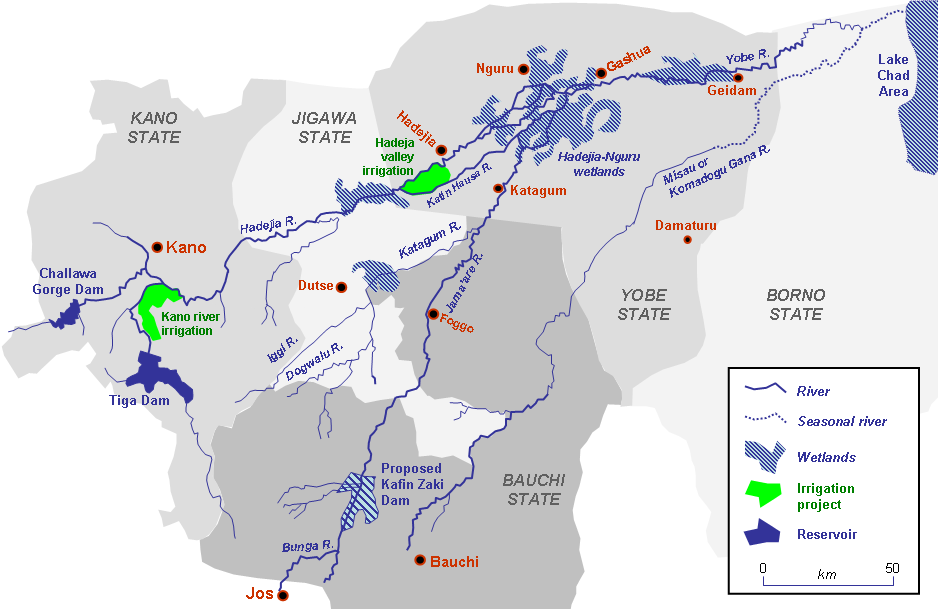
Catchment area of the Yobe River

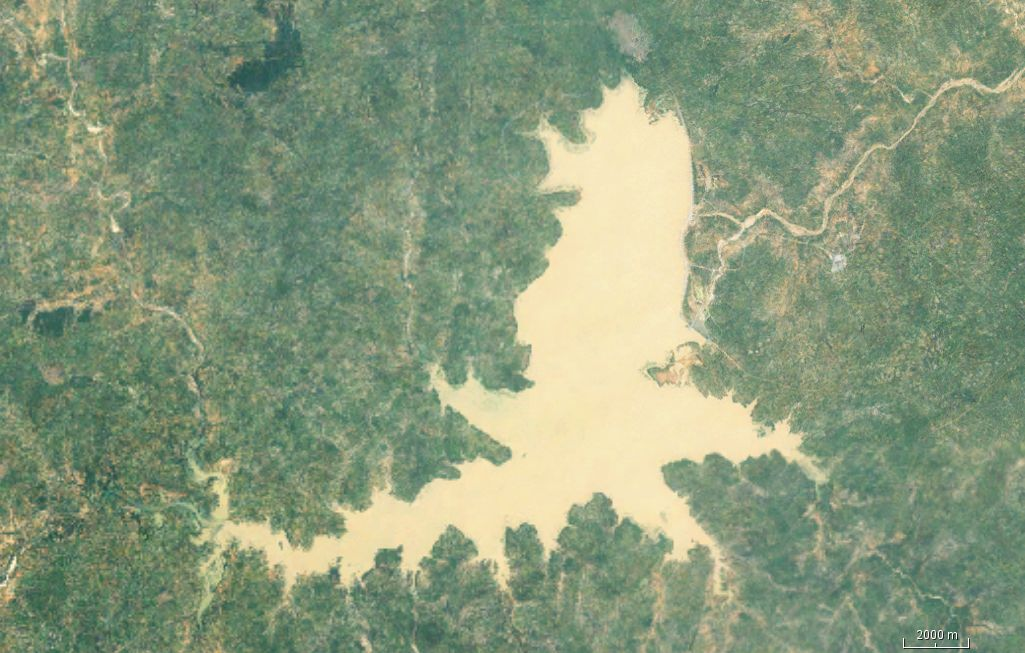
The Challawa Gorge Reservoir from space

The Challawa Gorge Dam is in Karaye Local Government Area of Kano State in the Northwest of Nigeria, about 90 km southwest of Kano city. It is a major reservoir on the Challawa River, a tributary of the Kano River, which is the main tributary of the Hadejia River.

== Construction ==
The Challawa Gorge reservoir project was started by the Water Resources and Engineering Construction Agency of the Kano State Government, and was later handed over to the Federal Government who funded the project. The dam is owned and operated by the Hadejia-Jama’are River Basin Development Authority, a Federal agency.

The dam was built by Julius Berger Nigeria in 1990 - 1992 using earth fill construction. It is 42 m high and 7.8 km in length. The dam has a full storage capacity of 930,000,000 and active storage of 904,000,000 m^{3}. The direct catchment area is 3857 km^{2}.

== Hydro power potential ==
The dam was designed with the potential for hydro power generation in mind, and may have a capacity of 3MW on average - more in the rainy season and less in dry season. However, power would cost considerably more to deliver than current retail prices, and it is not clear how a project to install the generating equipment would be financed.

== Issues ==
The soil in the immediate catchments of the dam has not been stabilized, so the reservoir may be silting up. Silt is also being deposited in the Challawa River, affecting the intake structures of Kano City Water Supply. The dam has disrupted the natural balance along the river. Upstream areas are now subject to flooding while downstream riverine wetlands and croplands have dried out.

The dam is intended to support irrigation projects, such as Hadejia Valley Irrigation Scheme which had been started since 1990, although only about 6,000 Ha were achieved, representing about 30% of the planned area only for decades. Amongst other competing uses of the dam is water supply to Kano city, informal irrigation at the river banks, recreation etc. The Challawa dam and the nearby Tiga Dam have also had adverse effects on the downstream Hadejia-Nguru wetlands. Several studies have shown that these dams have delivered negative economic value when their effect on downstream communities was taken into account.
