= Yobe River =

Nigerian river

Coordinates: 12°39′06″N 10°38′50″E

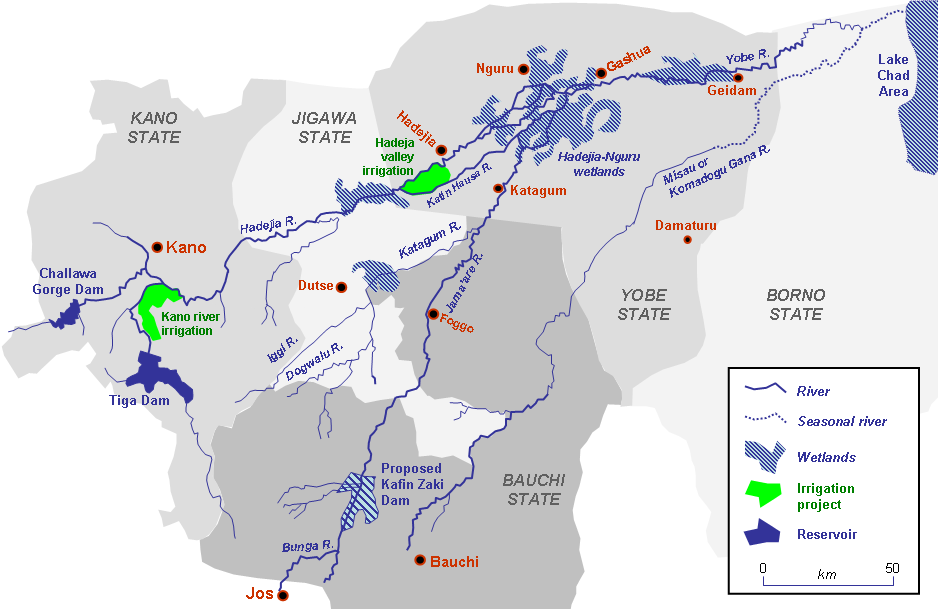
- Catchment area of the Yobe River
- Native name: French: Komadougou Yobé

Location
- Region: West Africa
- Countries: Nigeria, Niger

Physical characteristics
- Mouth: Lake Chad
- Length: 200 miles (320 km)

Basin features
- Cities: Gashua, Geidam, Damasak, Diffa

The Yobe River, also known as the Komadougou Yobe also spelt Komadugu or the Komadougou-Yobe (French: Komadougou Yobé), is a river in West Africa that flows into Lake Chad through Nigeria and Niger. Its tributaries include the Hadejia River, the Jama'are River, and the Komadugu Gana River. The river forms a small part of the international border between Niger and Nigeria with 95 miles (150 km) and flows a total of 200 miles (320 km).

There are concerns about changes in the river flow, economy and ecology due to upstream dams, the largest at present being the Tiga Dam in Kano State, with plans being discussed for the Kafin Zaki Dam in Bauchi State.

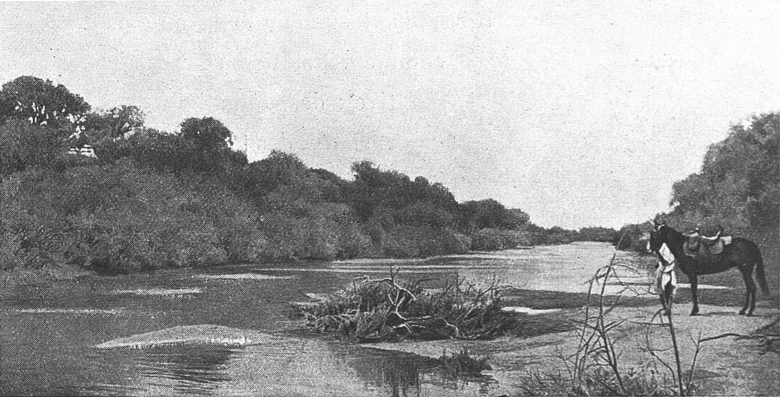
Yobe River in 1900

The River Yobe provides a means of subsistence for hundreds of thousands of people who work in a variety of commercial and agricultural endeavours along its almost 200 km length in the state's northern region, which spans seven local government areas (LGAs) from Nguru to Yunusari.

Notable towns near the river include Gashua, Geidam, and Damasak in Nigeria, and Diffa in Niger.

== Pollution ==
Some rural dwellers in Yobe complained that chemicals and waste products had contaminated various water sources in their communities, posing danger to lives.

Water tests were collected from Yobe River amid the stormy and dry seasons at Nguru, Gashua, Azbak, Dumsai and Wachakal. The tests were analyzed for their mineral constituents counting Zn, Pb, Fe, Mn and Mg utilizing the Nuclear Assimilation Spectrometry (AAS) whereas Na, Ca, and K were analyzed utilizing Fire Emanation Spectrometry (FES). The ranges of metal concentrations gotten are; Zn (7.06 mg/dm3 – 13.44 mg/dm3), Pb (0.05 mg/dm3 – 0.135 mg/dm3), Fe (0.052 mg/dm3 – 0.53 mg/dm3), Mn (0.102 mg/dm3 – 0.383 mg/dm3), Ca (28.50 mg/dm3 – 87.52 mg/dm3), Mg (7.34 mg/dm3 – 29.4 mg/dm3), Na (13.95 mg/dm3 – 22.98 mg/dm3) and K (40.08 mg/dm3 – 78.2 mg/dm3 ). From the levels of metals analyzed, it can be concluded that concentrations of Zn, Pb, Fe and Mn were all over WHO and Child allowable limits in all inspecting regions. This demonstrates an increment in metal contamination stack, likely due to fertilizer development, agrarian cinders and sewage-effluent run-off squanders. Water tests sourced from this stream may be that as it may be utilized for agrarian and water system purposes but unfit for human utilization.

== See also ==
- Yobe State
- Hadejia-Nguru wetlands
