= Jama'are River =

Jama’are River Bunga River
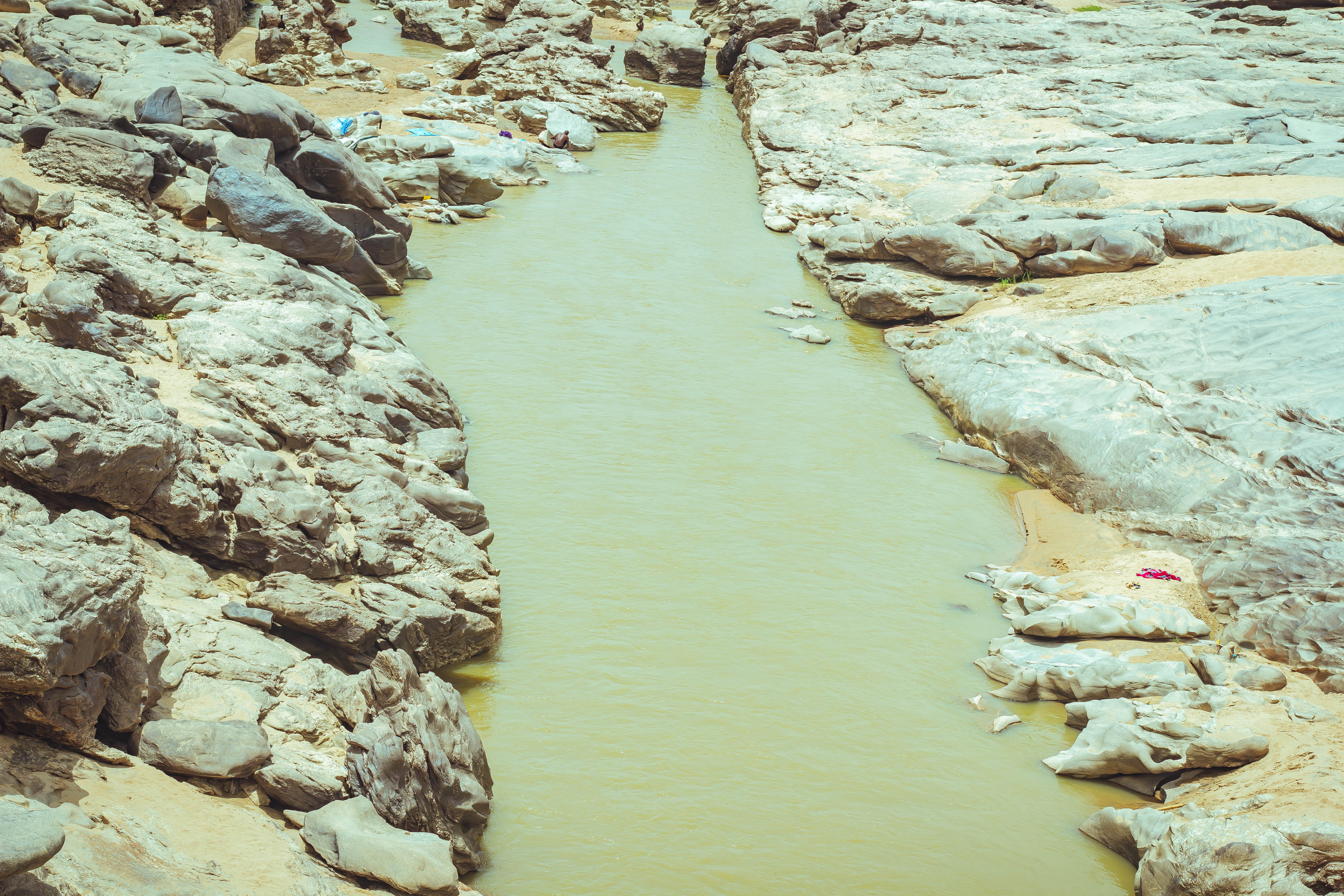

Location
- Countries: Nigeria

Physical characteristics
- Mouth: Yobe River
  - location: Burum Gana, River Burum Gana

Basin features
- Tributaries
  - left: Jama’are River
  - right: Hadejia River, and Komadugu Gana River

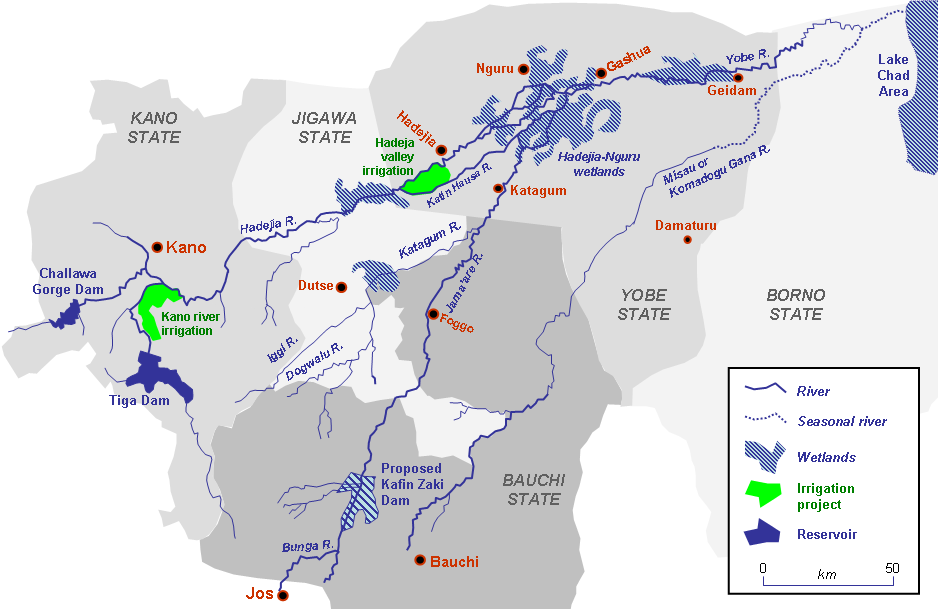
Catchment area of the Yobe River

The Jama'are River, also known as the Bunga River in its upper reaches, starts in the highlands near Jos, Plateau State, Nigeria and flows northeast through Bauchi State and Yobe State before joining the Hadejia River to form the Yobe River. There has recently been controversy over a plan to build the Kafin Zaki Dam on this river, with concerns over the effect on seasonal flooding and the water table.

== Weather/Climate ==
In Jamaare, which at an elevation of 0 metres/feet above sea level, experiences tropical wet and dry or savanna weather. The district averages a yearly temperature of 30.37 °C (86.67 °F), which is 0.91% higher than the national average for Nigeria. The average annual precipitation in Jamaare is 90.02 mm (3.544 in), with 121.31 wet days (33.24% of the time).
