= Hadejia River =

River in Northern Nigeria

Coordinates: 12.651667°N 10.647222°E

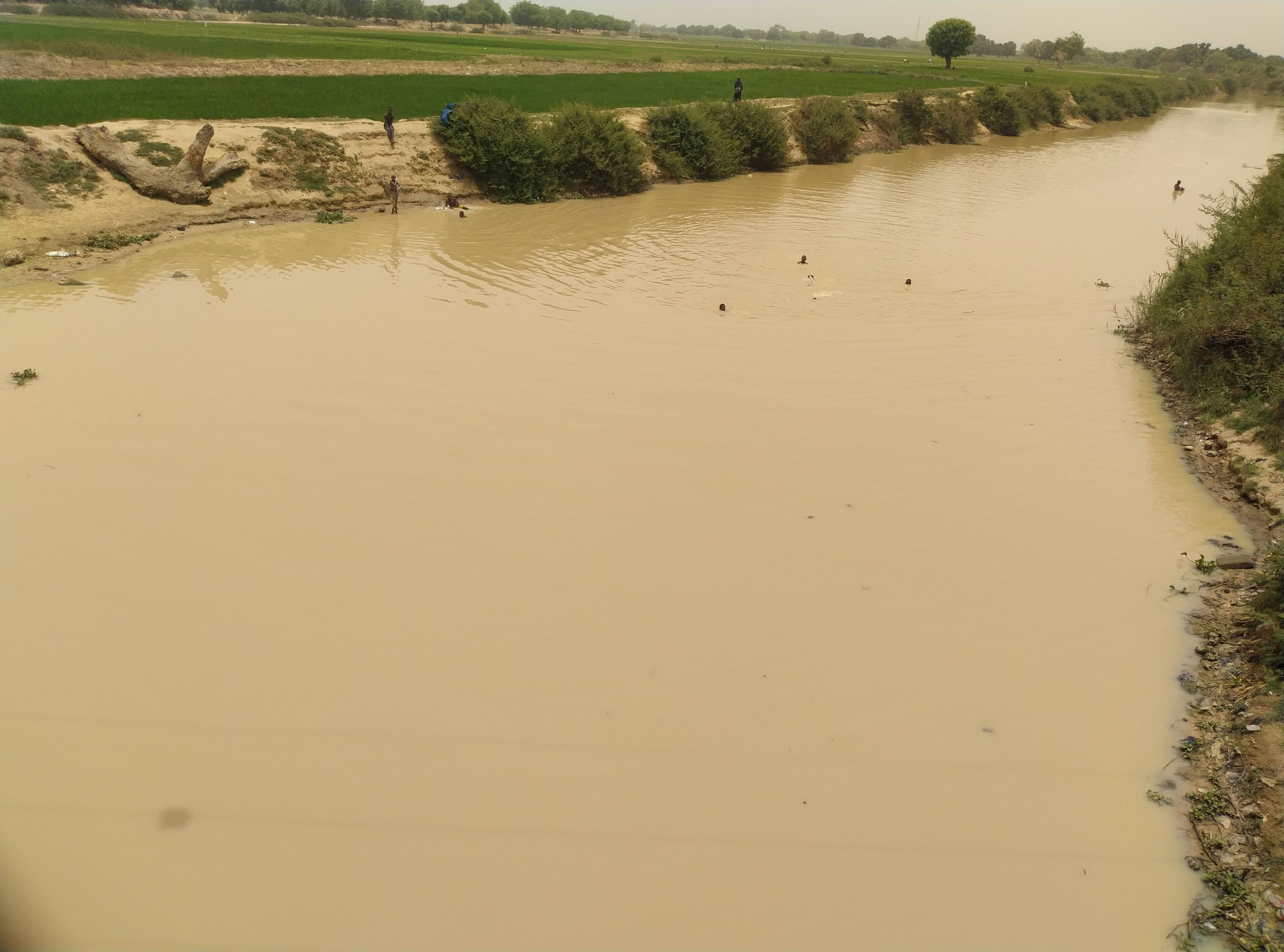
River Hadejia

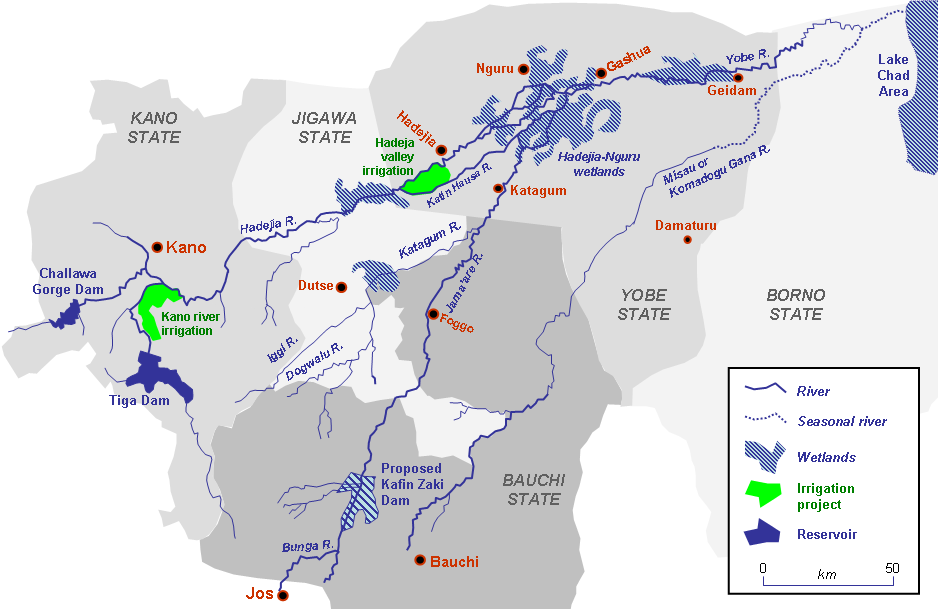
Catchment area of the Yobe River

The Hadejia River (Hausa: kogin Haɗeja) is a river in Northern Nigeria and is a tributary of the Yobe River (Komadugu Yobe). Among the cities and towns that lie on or near its banks are Hadejia and Nguru. Damming of the river for the purposes of irrigation has led to a decrease in the amount of water in the Hadejia-Nguru wetlands, which the river forms along with Nguru Lake.

The Hadejia river is now 80% controlled by the Tiga and Challawa Gorge dams in Kano State.

== Flood ==
The state government started clearing the Hadejia River's canal and preventing water overflows, after the state experienced significant flooding, this work was started to prevent future floods.

Flood frequency analysis was performed on the maximum annual streamflow data for the River Hadejia gauge station from the Hadejia Jama'are Komadugu TrustFund, Damaturu, for the years 1963 to 2014. For the analysis, three probability distribution functions—Extreme Value Type 1 (EV-1), Lognormal, and Log Pearson Type III—were employed. The models were used to forecast and contrast the associated flood discharge predictions for return periods of 2, 5, 10, 25, 50, 100, and 200 years. At a 200-year return time, the results for EV-1, LN, and LP III showed anticipated discharge values of 157.419, 169.43, and 135.21, respectively. It is advised to use the lognormal distribution model for safe design since the results show that it provides greater flood discharge estimates.

== Climate and weather ==
in Hadejia the weather condition of the wet season is hot and is most of the time cloudy. The dry season is partly cloudy, and the temperature varies from 15 °C (59 °F). to 41 °C (105 °F).

From March 21 to June 2, the hot season lasts 2.4 months, with an average daily high temperature of over 101 °F. In Hadejia, May is the hottest month of the year, with an average high of 103 °F and low of 80 °F.

From December 9 to January 31, the chilly season, with an average daily high temperature below 90 °F, lasts for 1.7 months. With an average low of 59 °F and a high of 88 °F, January is the coldest month of the year in Hadejia.
