= Dantata =

Dantata is a surname occurring in Nigeria. Notable people with the surname include:

- Alhassan Dantata (1877–1955), Nigerian businessman and philanthropist
- Aminu Dantata (1931–2025), Nigerian businessman and philanthropist, son of Alhassan
- Mahmud Dantata (1922–1983), Nigerian businessman and politician, son of Alhassan
- Sanusi Dantata (c. 1919–1997), Nigerian entrepreneur, son of Alhassan
