= Wealth of Aliko Dangote =

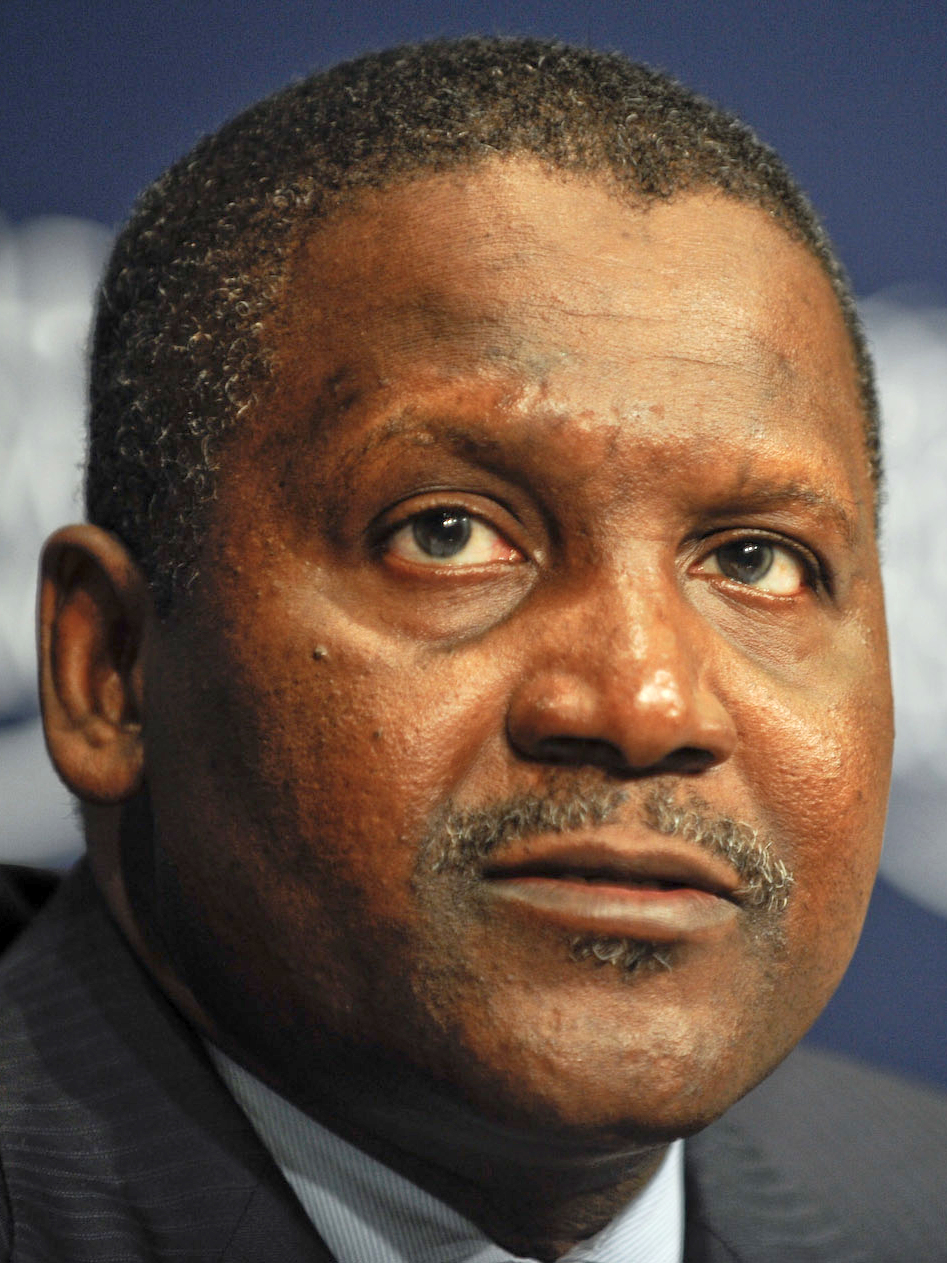
Dangote during the Fellowship Programme with Young Global Leaders announcement at the African World Economic Forum in Cape Town, South Africa, 2011

Aliko Dangote is the wealthiest person in Africa, with an estimated net worth of US$39.4 billion as of 31 October 2026, according to the Bloomberg Billionaires Index, and $55.4 billion according to Forbes, primarily from his oil refinery, cement and sugar business.

Having been first listed on the Forbes Billionaires List in 2008, with a net worth of $3.3 billion. His wealth dropped by 2009 to $2.5 billion, and subsequently, $2.1 billion in 2010. His wealth increased to $13.8 billion in 2011 after he founded the Dangote Cement. Dangote hold a share of 86 percent of Dangote Cement as well as in other traded holding like NASCON Allied Industries, Dangote Sugar, and the United Bank for Africa. According to Nairametrics, his wealth decreased by over $1 billion in 2024 as a result of naira's low market value and moderation in the value of his equity holdings. By September 2024, Dangote regained his position as the richest man in Africa after having been previously surpassed by Johann Rupert in January of the same year.

== History ==
Aliko Dangote started his business with a $500,000 loan from his uncle. He excelled in trading commodities including bagged cement and agricultural products like rice and sugar. In 1999, he expanded his business to building sugar refineries and a flour mill.

Dangote was first listed on Forbes Billionaires List in 2008, with a net worth of $3.3 billion. In 2010 when Dangote Sugar debuted on the Nigerian Stock Exchange, Forbes reported that the sales earned Dangote over $450 million, and Dangote Flour's revenue increased to $270 million.

Dangote has always described his business life as "exciting", and notes that he has also encountered obstacles. In an interview with Forbes Africa, he asserts that "overcoming these challenges required big thinking and an innovative approach. You have to dream big to be able to be big and that's what we're doing." He said that he is driven by the impact he has for humanity, praising himself as one of "Africa's top philanthropists".

In an analysis by Punch, Dangote Cement paid federal taxes of N97.24 billion in 2020, N173.93 billion in 2021, and N141.69 billion in 2022; hence a total of N412.86 billion, Dangote Sugar Refinery paid N55.38 billion, and NASCON Allied Industries paid N5.39 billion.

In June 2013, Dangote was the first African to reach the networth of $20 billion. In February 2014, his net worth reached $25 billion. Between 31 December 2014 and 31 December 2015, Dangote's net worth dropped by $3 billion, and decreased to $14.7 billion, mostly by the weak rate of naira and low demand for cement.

In 2024, following the commencement of the refinery, his wealth had surged to $27.8 billion, according to the Bloomberg Billionaires Index.

== Management ==
Dangote's wealth is managed by his family office in Dubai and run by his daughter Halima.

== Philanthropy ==
=== Education ===
Dangote has stated that the Federal Government could not bear the burden of funding of tertiary institutions alone since there are demanding needs of other sectors, hence he donated a hostel complex in Ahmadu Bello University in Zaria in 2019, which could reportedly accommodate 2160 students.

Dangote, through his fertiliser company, Dangote Fertiliser Company Limited, constructed school infrastructures for schools under the Lagos State Universal Basic Education Board. According to the company, the structures were built as part of the Corporate Social Responsibility of the company, and should serve as replacement for the Abejoye Primary School, a free trade zone area donated to the company before the school's relocation. The structures are staff rooms, headteacher's office, restrooms, borehole, and a generator.

=== Insurgency ===
In May 2016, Dangote donated $10 million to families affected by the insurgency caused by Boko Haram, during his visit to camps in Borno state along with the then governor Kashim Shettima. Africanews has considered the donation as "the biggest by any individual towards helping victims of the crisis in the Northeast region of Nigeria".

=== Politics ===
In 2016, Dangote and Bill Gates donated a $100m scheme to solve malnutrition in Nigeria.

Dangote donated N120 million in 1999 to support the Olusegun Obasanjo's campaign for the 1999 Nigerian presidential election. In 2025, he donated N6 billion and annual to-be-paid N2 billion for the presidential library for Ibrahim Babangida.
