= Dantata family =

Nigerian business dynasty

- Business family
- Country: Nigeria
- Place of origin: Kano State
- Current head: Tajudeen Dantata
- Titles: Alhaji
- Connected members: Aliko Dangote; Sani Dangote; Halima Dangote
- Traditions: Islam

The Dantata family is a Nigerian business dynasty from Kano State. Its business history is associated with Alhassan Dantata, a merchant who became involved in the trade of kolanuts and groundnuts and established Alhassan Dantata & Sons. Members of later generations established businesses in several sectors, including construction, oil and gas, agriculture and real estate.

== Business history ==
=== Alhassan Dantata ===
Alhassan Dantata was born in 1877 at Bebeji, in present-day Kano State. He came from a family of long-distance traders.

Dantata traded in kolanuts, groundnuts and other commodities. His trading activities linked Northern Nigeria with the Gold Coast and other parts of West Africa. During the expansion of groundnut production in Northern Nigeria, he developed a network of agents and sub-agents who purchased groundnuts for him.

In 1929, when the Bank of British West Africa opened a branch in Kano, Dantata became one of its first major indigenous customers. By the 1940s, his business was purchasing and trading large quantities of groundnuts. He later became involved in importing, transport, real estate and construction.

Dantata later established Alhassan Dantata & Sons. By the early 1950s, his three eldest sons, Ahmadu, Sanusi and Aminu, were involved in different parts of the business, including land, building, contracting and transport.

Alhassan Dantata died in Kano on 17 August 1955. His children subsequently continued his business interests, with some establishing separate businesses.

== Second generation ==
=== Ahmadu Dantata ===
Ahmadu Dantata (1916–1960) was a businessman and politician. He was a son of Alhassan Dantata and became managing director of Alhassan Dantata & Sons. He also served in the Northern House of Assembly.

Ahmadu died in 1960. After his death, Aminu Dantata took over the management of Alhassan Dantata & Sons.

=== Sanusi Dantata ===
Sanusi Dantata (c. 1919–1997) was a businessman and son of Alhassan Dantata. He was involved in the family business before establishing his own commercial interests.

Sanusi established Sanusi Dantata & Sons. The company became one of the businesses associated with the Dantata family, alongside Alhassan Dantata & Sons.

Sanusi's business activities included commodity trading and other commercial interests. Some of his sons later became involved in businesses established by the Sanusi branch of the family.

=== Mahmud Dantata ===
Mahmud Dantata (1922–1983), also known as Mamuda Wapa, was a businessman and politician. He joined his father's business before establishing his own commercial interests.

Mahmud became involved in tourism, hotels, currency trading and the transportation of Muslim pilgrims. He established the West African Pilgrims Agency and operated services for pilgrims travelling to Saudi Arabia.

He later served in the Federal Parliament of Nigeria.

=== Aminu Dantata ===
Aminu Dantata (1931–2025) was a businessman and politician. He joined Alhassan Dantata & Sons in 1948 and became involved in the management of the company. After the death of his brother Ahmadu in 1960, he became head of the company.

Under Aminu Dantata, the business expanded into construction and other commercial activities. He later established Express Petroleum & Gas Company and became involved in other businesses and investments.

Aminu Dantata also served in the Northern House of Assembly and later held a commissioner position in Kano State from 1967 to 1972.

== Division of the family businesses ==
After the death of Alhassan Dantata, different members of the family developed separate businesses. According to Munzali Dantata, a member of the family, the original company eventually broke up as members of the family established their own companies.

During the 1960s and 1970s, Sanusi Dantata & Sons and Alhassan Dantata & Sons were two of the better-known companies associated with the family.

The branch managed by Aminu Dantata later expanded beyond the original commodity-export business into construction, imports and other activities.

== Relationship with the Dangote family ==
Aliko Dangote is a great-grandson of Alhassan Dantata through his mother, Mariya Sanusi Dantata. Sanusi Dantata was Aliko Dangote's maternal grandfather.

== Notable members ==
- Alhassan Dantata (1877–1955), merchant and founder of Alhassan Dantata & Sons
- Sanusi Dantata (c. 1919–1997), businessman
- Mahmud Dantata (1922–1983), businessman and politician
- Aminu Dantata (1931–2025), businessman and politician

== See also ==
- Dangote Group
- Dangote refinery
- Jaiz Bank
- Dangote Cement
- Dangote Industries Tanzania
