= Ibrahim Musa Gashash =

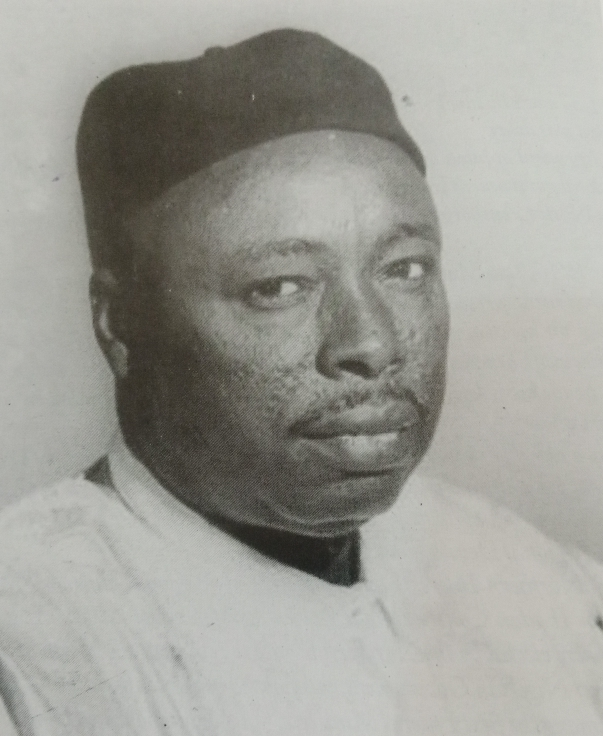

Regional Minister without Portfolio
- In office 1956–1958

Regional Minister for Social Services
- In office 1958–1960

Regional Minister for Land and Survey
- In office 1960–1966

Personal details
- Party: Northern People's Congress
- Profession: Businessman

Ibrahim Musa Gashash was a Kano trader and politician who was among a group of prominent Northern Nigerians that formed the Northern People's Congress. Along with two other Kano merchants, he helped establish the first indigenous pilgrimage tour company in Kano.

Gashash was a descendant of a Tripolitanian Arab family from Ghademes.

== Life ==
=== Business career ===
In the 1950s, Ibrahim Gashash was among a select few of Nigerian traders that acquired licenses to trade in commodities, especially peanuts and cotton. The merchants who acquired the license were named Licensed Buying Agents (LBA), while membership into the league of agents was discriminatory. The requirements to become one included knowledge of the English language, book keeping and a high capital base. The agents were usually involved in buying Kola nut, ground nut and cotton from producers and transporting the goods to major trade centers for further exchange with exporters or major trading companies of the era. Gashash, succeeded in this environment as an indigenous produce buying agent. The high barrier of entry towards acquisition of the license among indigenous traders resulted in a few class of merchant elite in Kano, with trade in the ancient city dominated by Levantine businessmen. Gashash's, LBA, gave him the opportunity to use his knowledge of Kano farmers and traders as an edge in transaction, and the avenue to expand into the transportation business, partially to transport his good to major trade center.

In 1948, along with Mahmud Dantata (son of Alhassan Dantata) and Haruna Kashim, he founded the West African Pilgrims Association, a tour agency that organized pilgrimages to Mecca. The group later expanded into the hotel business, with Bakin Zuwo as manager. In 1950, he co-founded the Kano Citizens Trading Company along with other Kano merchants, the cooperative was the first indigenous joint commercial enterprise formed in Kano and Gashash became secretary of the company.

By the 1950s, Gashash had emerged as a financier of the Northern People's Congress and was later made minister for Land and Survey.

=== Political career ===
In 1952, Gashash became the regional president of the Northern People's Congress, after an emergency convention had been called due to a large proportion of executive party leaders not being legislators or members of the Northern Regional Assembly, a dangerous mistake in a parliamentary system of government. The party was original made up of notable and prominent men from the north.

In 1952, a working committee later joined by Musa Gashash, was set up to create the organizational structures of the nascent political organization. Gashash later became a minister without portfolio in 1956–1958, In 1958, he was made Minister for social welfare and cooperatives and by 1960, he was the minister for Land and Survey.
