= Agalawa =

Subgroup of the Hausa people in Nigeria

The Agalawa are an important sub-group of the Hausa people in Northern Nigeria, notable for their historical involvement in trade, governance, and Islamic scholarship. With origins that might trace back to North Africa, possibly among the Amazigh, they became fully integrated into Hausa society and culture.

The Agalawa were prominent merchants, setting up extensive trade networks that linked Hausa city-states like Kano, Katsina, and Zaria with key trading hubs across West Africa. Their trade dealt with goods such as textiles, kola nuts, salt, and livestock.

Aside from their commercial activities, the Agalawa held administrative roles and often acted as intermediaries between rulers and the people, which contributed to the political and economic stability of the region. Their contributions to Islamic education and the spread of Islam were also significant, as many Agalawa were Islamic scholars who influenced the region's religious identity.

During British colonization, they adapted to new systems while maintaining their influence. Today, the Agalawa are recognized for their lasting contributions to the economic and cultural development of Hausa society, especially in trade and Islamic learning.

== Notable people ==
- Aliko Dangote
- Halima Dangote
- Sani Dangote
- Aminu Dantata
