= Adia Sowho =

Nigerian technology executive

- Education: University of Sheffield; Kellogg School of Management, Northwestern University
- Occupation: Technology executive
- Known for: Chief Marketing Officer of MTN Nigeria (2021–2024)

Adia Sowho is a Nigerian technology executive. She was the Chief Marketing Officer of MTN Nigeria from 2021 to 2024, becoming the first woman to hold the position. She previously held executive roles at Etisalat Nigeria, and the digital lending company Migo, and was Interim Chief Executive Officer of the agricultural technology company Thrive Agric.

== Education ==
Sowho earned a bachelor's degree in Electronic and Electrical Engineering from the University of Sheffield and an MBA from the Kellogg School of Management at Northwestern University.

== Career ==
=== Engineering and telecommunications ===
Sowho began her career in 2001 as a radio frequency engineer at U.S. Cellular in the United States. In 2007, she joined Deloitte as a management consultant. In 2010, she joined Etisalat Nigeria, which was later renamed 9mobile. Her roles included head of strategy and business development, head of digital media, and director of digital business. She left the company in 2018. Her work at 9mobile included partnerships with startups providing mobile content, advertising, financial services and application programming interfaces. A 2022 profile in Nairametrics reported that she established the company's digital business unit and increased its revenue to US$100 million over four years. At the 2016 eWorld Forum, Sowho advocated collaboration between telecommunications operators and financial institutions to expand digital financial services. She identified interoperability, distribution networks, technology platforms and product variety as requirements for financial inclusion.

=== Migo and Thrive Agric ===
From 2018 to 2020, Adia Sowho worked at Migo, formerly known as Mines.io, as managing director for Nigeria and vice president of growth. The company provided digital credit using machine learning. Nairametrics reported that she helped develop Migo's Nigerian operation and a platform business model that reached one million customers in two years and expanded to Brazil.

In October 2020, Thrive Agric announced her appointment as interim chief executive officer, with co-founder Uka Eje moving to the role of chief operating officer. Her appointment formed part of a restructuring after the company experienced difficulties repaying investors during the COVID-19 pandemic. In May 2021, Sowho announced that Thrive Agric had completed all overdue payments to its crowdfunding subscribers. BusinessDay reported that the company's crowdfunding operations remained suspended at the time. She remained an adviser to Thrive Agric after her interim executive role ended.

=== MTN Nigeria ===
In August 2021, Adia Sowho was appointed chief marketing officer of MTN Nigeria, becoming the first woman appointed to the role. She represented the company at its February 2022 brand refresh announcement in Lagos, where she discussed its digital platforms strategy. As CMO, Adia Sowho led the commercial launch of MTN Nigeria's 5G network in September 2022, making the company the first Nigerian telecommunications operator to launch 5G services.

In October 2023, Sowho spoke at the unveiling of MTN CHAMPS, a schools' athletics championship organised with Making of Champions, the Athletics Federation of Nigeria and the Nigeria School Sport Federation. She described the programme's plans to offer academy places to selected athletes. She left MTN Nigeria in June 2024. In her departure statement, reported by Techpoint Africa, Sowho said that the consumer business had recorded annual growth exceeding 20% during her tenure and that the data business had recorded year-on-year growth of 50%. She also described changes to customer analytics and digital data collection.

== Other activities ==
In 2022, Nairametrics reported that Adia Sowho served as a non-executive director at Hover Developer Services and Sankore Investments. It also reported her work mentoring startups and advising Africa-focused venture capital firms. In 2022, she was named as a strategic adviser to the fintech investment fund RaliCap.

== Recognition ==
In 2019, Adia Sowho was featured in TechCabal's "Tech Women Lagos" series, a portrait series of women in the Nigerian technology sector. In 2022, Adia Sowho received the Most Outstanding Marketing Professional of the Year award in the IT and telecommunications category at the Women in Marketing Communications Conference and Awards. In 2023, she received the Brand Personality of the Year award at the ADVAN African Awards for Marketing Excellence, organised by the Advertisers Association of Nigeria.
