= Aliko (given name) =

Aliko is a given name. Notable people with the name include:

- Aliko Bala (born 1997), Nigerian footballer
- Aliko Dangote (born 1957), Nigerian business magnate and philanthropist
- Aliko Kibona (born 1956), Tanzanian politician
