= Sanusi Dantata =

Nigerian businessman (c. 1919–1997)

- Born: c. 1919; Kano, Northern Region, British Nigeria (now in Kano State, Nigeria)
- Died: 15 April 1997 (aged 77–78)
- Occupation: Businessman
- Children: Abdulkadir; Usman amaka; Hassan; Nasiru; Mariya
- Parent: Alhassan Dantata (father)
- Relatives: Aminu Dantata (brother); Aliko Dangote (grandson); Sani Dangote (grandson); Halima Dangote (great-granddaughter)
- Family: Dantata family

Sanusi Dantata (c. 1919 – 15 April 1997) was a Nigerian entrepreneur and son of Alhassan Dantata. He was a director of the Nigeria branch of Shell B.P. and founder of Sanusi Dantata and Sons Limited.

== Business career ==
Dantata only completed four years of studies at Dala Elementary School before leaving because his father preferred a career in trading to Western education for his children. When he was 16 years old, he was given a share of his father's cattle business, the purchase of cattle in the north and transport by rail to Lagos for sale. Thereafter, he added groundnut produce buying and transport and haulage as part of his enterprise. However, he was forced to sell much of the transport and cattle business by 1947 and later added on real estate. He was in the real estate and groundnut business when his father died in 1955. His father left a will to be shared among his nineteen children and three wives following Maliki law. Dantata's share of cash from the will was over $12,000 but he was already wealthy by that time. He used the inheritance to revive his transport and lorry business. In the 1960s, he was the largest licensed produce buying agent of groundnut in Nigeria. However, by 1980, he had relinquished some of his business interest to his sons, including the eldest, Abdulkadir Sanusi Dantata, who co-founded Dantata and Sawoe and Asada Farms.

Dantata was also charitable, by 1963, he was spending about 40,000 pounds each year in credit to friends and the poor and provided funds to each of his children and in-laws.

The Dantata family operated their businesses partly through a patrimonial system of credit allocation, trade and business transfers to kin, household and others members of their clientage. At one point in time, both Sanusi and his brother, Aminu controlled about 200 agents involved in buying Kola nut, Livestock, Groundnut and Merchandise. The system involved about five autonomous level of associates, agents, and farmers. Some members of this system engage in buying goods from restricted rural areas and transporting it to the city where another group of agents in the Urban area buys the goods and store them instead of Dantata. Also, the Dantata family through marriage and credit extension is linked with a few independent trading families in Kano and Northern Nigeria.

== Islam ==
He was also a personal friend of the Qadiriyya scholar, Ali Kumasi and supported some of the latter's religious works in Kano. His support for Ali Kumasi led him into conflict with Nasiru Kabara, the leader of the Qadiriyya movement in Kano and West Africa and a former tutor of Sanusi. Both Kumasi and Dantata tried to promote an independent Qadiriyya scholarship and religious authority, challenging the leadership of Kabara. However, by the early 1970s, both men joined the Kabara faction of Kano Qadiriyya.
