= Groundnut pyramids =

Nigerian groundnut sack structures

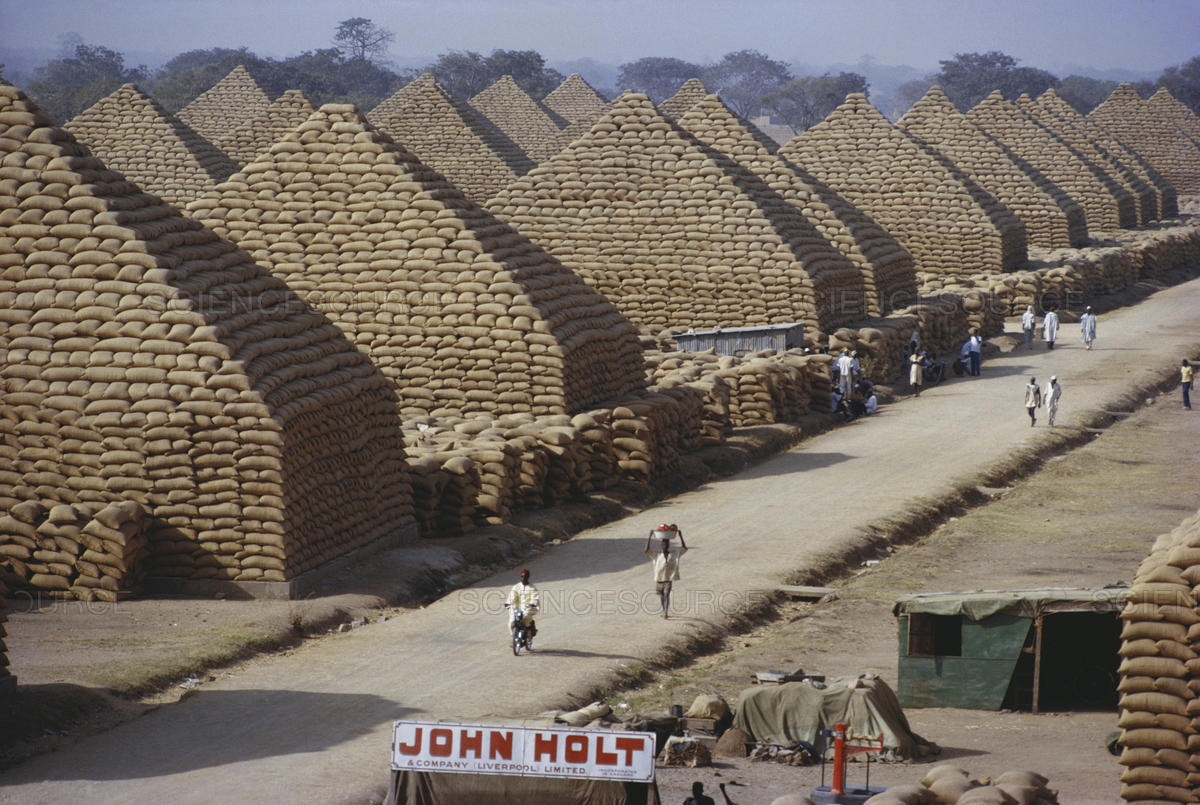
Ground Nut Pyramids in Kano, Nigeria

Groundnut pyramids were pyramid-like structures made from groundnut sacks. The pyramids were built in northern Nigerian cities such as Kano, where groundnut production was a key part of the economy. They were viewed as both a tourist attraction and a symbol of wealth. In the 1960s and 70s, as production in Nigeria shifted from agriculture to oil, the groundnut pyramids disappeared. Recently, the Nigerian government has made efforts to revive the groundnut industry and rebuild the pyramids.

== History ==
Groundnut pyramids were the invention of Alhassan Dantata, a prominent nut trader. Dantata came to Kano in the year 1919 and within five years was one of the most successful businessmen, supplying the Royal Niger Company (RNC) with most of their groundnuts. Dantata's company kept their groundnuts at a facility in Kofar Nassarawa, and they stacked the bags in the shape of a pyramid before they were shipped. One groundnut pyramid could be made from as much as 15,000 full groundnut bags. A journalist who visited a former groundnut pyramid site in Kano reported that the land was now a football field.

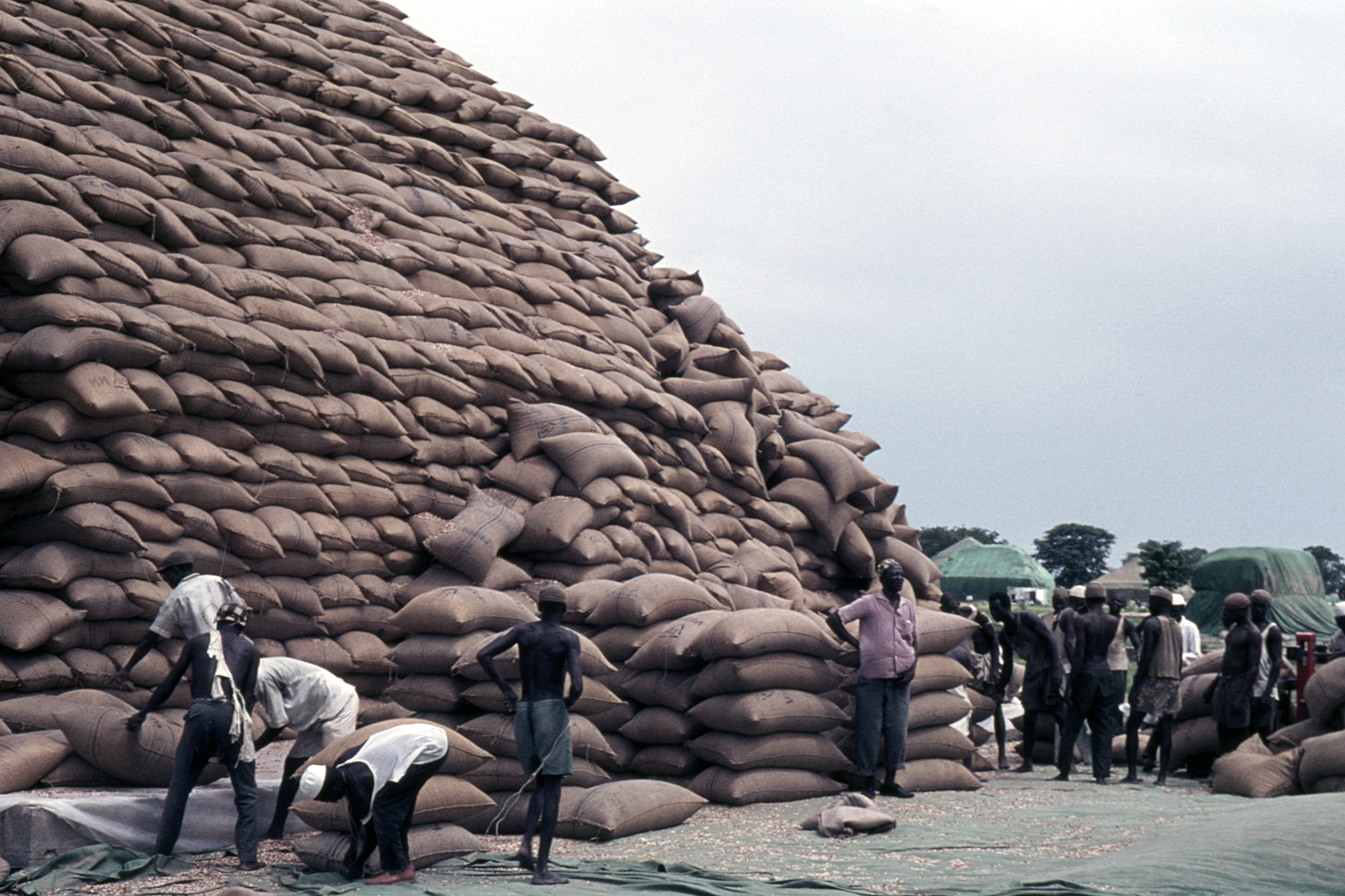
Labourers stacking groundnut sacks to form a pyramid (Kano, 1965)

Groundnut pyramids were built all across northern Nigeria, in cities like Kofar Mazugal, Brigade, Bebeji, Malam Madori and Dawakin Kudu. The pyramids became synonymous with Nigeria's agricultural wealth; a postage stamp even featured a groundnut pyramid. However, as groundnut production declined in the 1970s and 80s the groundnut pyramids disappeared and were replaced with buildings.

== Modern efforts ==
On February 24, 2014, Dr. Akinwumi Adesina, Minister of Agriculture and Rural Development launched a groundnut value chain project. This project is a joint venture between the Federal Government (FG) of Nigeria and the International Crops Research Institute for the Semi-Arid Tropics (ICRISAT). Their aim is twofold: to increase Nigeria's groundnut production and rebuild the groundnut pyramids. President Goodluck Jonathan reiterated the government's desire to rebuild the pyramids in a bridge dedication speech in March 2015.
