= Abdulmumin Jibrin =

Nigerian politician

Abdulmumin Jibrin PhD
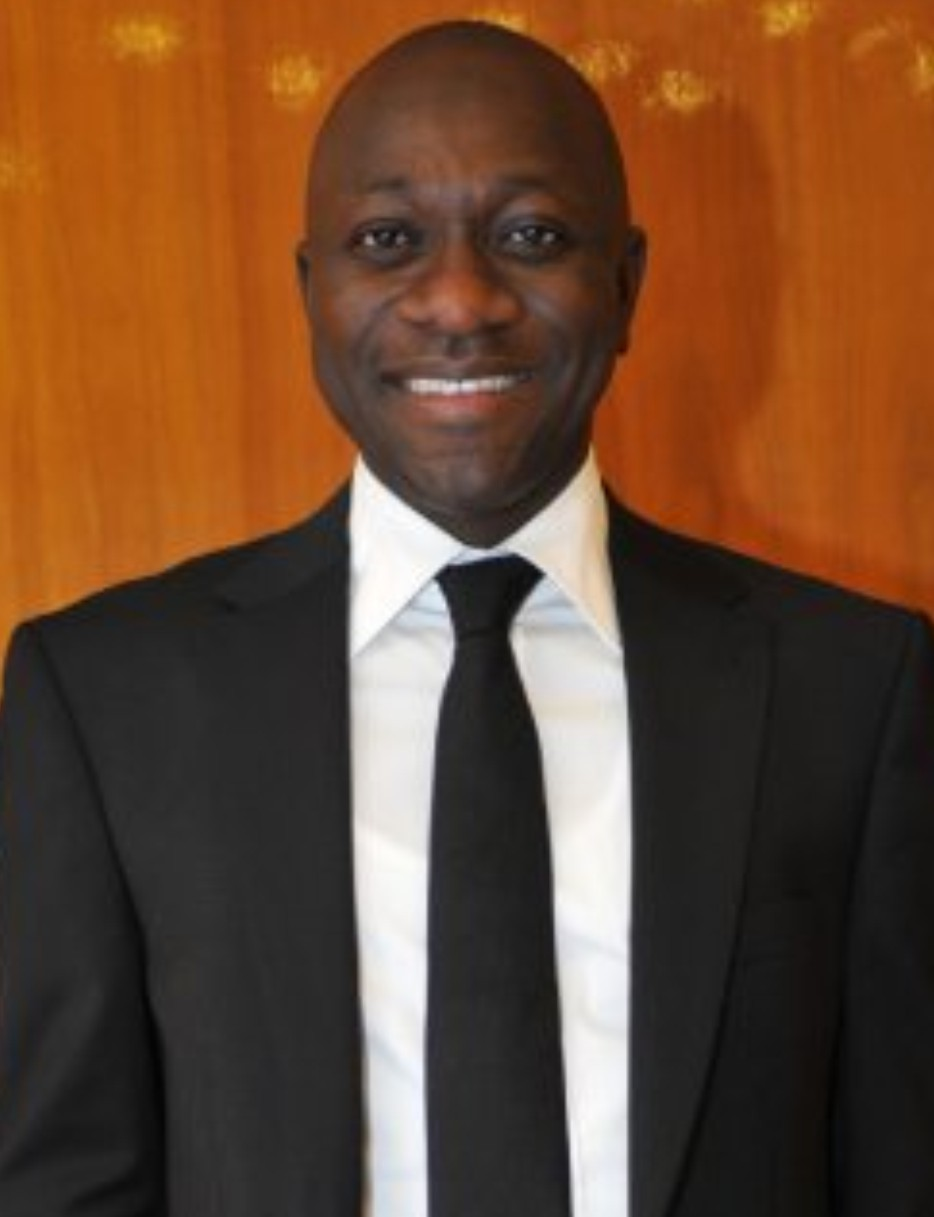
- Abdulmumin Jibrin

Executive Director of Research and Innovation Development, Federal Housing Authority
- In office October 2021 – May 2022
- Preceded by: Position established

Executive Director of Business Development, Federal Housing Authority
- In office July 2020 – October 2021
- Preceded by: Mrs. Ebere Alalibo
- Succeeded by: Position repositioned

Member of the House of Representatives of Nigeria
- In office 6 June 2011 – 1 November 2019
- Preceded by: Hon. Ubale Jadaga Kiru
- Succeeded by: Hon. Ali Datti Yako

Personal details
- Born: 9 September 1976 (age 50) Kano, Nigeria
- Party: New Nigeria People's Party
- Other political affiliations: Peoples Democratic Party (PDP) (2010–2014); All Progressives Congress (APC) (2014–2022)
- Education: University of Abuja
- Occupation: Legislature
- Profession: Politician

Abdulmumin Jibrin (born 9 September 1976) is a Nigerian politician, businessman, academic, and member of the Nigerian House of Representatives representing Kiru/Bebeji federal constituency of Kano State He was recently re-elected on the platform of the New Nigerian People Party. He served as the Federal Housing Authority's Executive Director of Research and Innovation Development from October 2021 until May 2022, under President Muhammadu Buhari's administration.

== Early life and education ==
Abdulmumin Jibrin was born in Kano into the family of Alhaji Labaran Mohammed Jibrin and Hajia Amina Gambo. He had his early education in Kano before being moved to Kaduna and later Abuja where his parents lived at various times to further his study.

Abdulmumin attended Army Primary School Janguza, Kano (1983–1986) before moving to Command Children School Jaji, Kaduna (1986–1988). He had his secondary education at Science Secondary School Abaji, Abuja (1989–1992), and Bwari Secondary School, Abuja (1992–1994). He later proceeded for his higher education and obtained a bachelor's degree in political science at the University of Abuja, Nigeria in 1999, M.Sc in International Affairs and Diplomacy at Ahmadu Bello University, Zaria, Nigeria in 2003 and Ph.D. in International Relations at the University of Abuja Nigeria in 2009.

He also attended London Business School 2009–2009, Harvard Business School 2009–2010, International Business House, London 2009, and European Institute of Business Administration INSEAD France, 2009 where he graduated and obtained various certificates in Senior Executive Program (SEP68 LBS), Global Economy Crisis (LBS), Negotiation, Competitive Decision and Deal Process (HBS), Program for Leadership Development (PLD9 HBS), International oil Trading (IBH London) and Telecommunications Strategy and Marketing (INSEAD). He completed the Oxford Strategic Leadership Program (OSLP) in 2016. He holds an MBA from the SBS – Swiss Business School, Zurich, Switzerland 2012–2014.

== Career ==
Abdulmumin Jibrin began his early professional career in media by working with Century Research and Communication Limited and later in the construction industry. After a stint at the communications company and some experience under some building construction companies, he moved on to establish his own company, Green Forest Investment Limited in 2003.

Jibrin later became the Managing Director and subsequently Chairman/CEO of Green Forest Group Limited, with subsidiaries in Energy, Property Development, Investment, Agriculture, Construction, and Engineering. He was also Chairman (Nigeria) of Turkish Construction giant, TASYAPI between 2010 and 2011.

He taught International Relations at Nasarawa State University, Nigeria, and authored publications in the field of International Relations viz- The new face of Nigeria's Foreign Policy, Nigeria's Role in Peace Keeping Operations in Africa. He is also a member of the Nigeria-America and Nigeria-British Chambers of Commerce. He was Chairman Abuja branch of the Nigeria-British Chamber of Commerce (NBCC) between 2010 – 2011.

== Politics ==
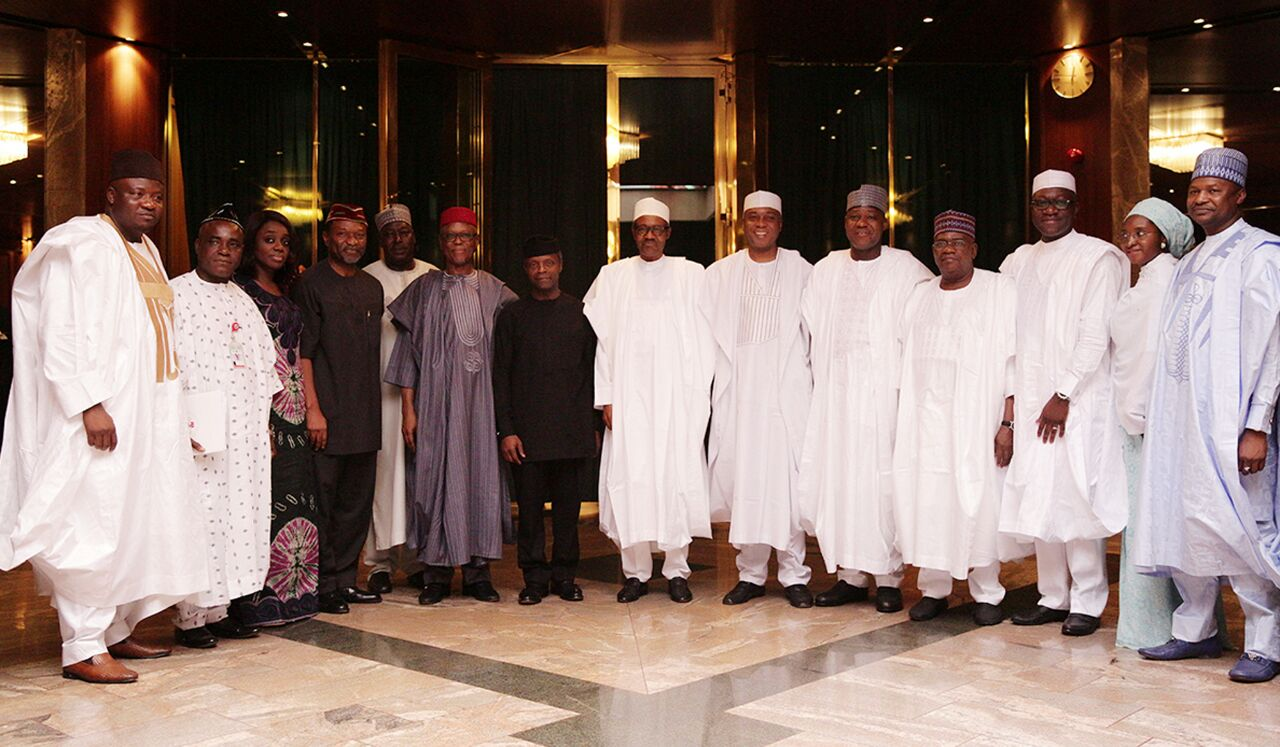
Chairman House Committee on Appropriation, Hon. Abdulmumin Jibrin (3rd Right) with President Muhammadu Buhari (7th Right), Vice President Yemi Osinbajo (7th Left), Senate President Bukola Saraki (6th Right) House of Reps Speaker, Yakubu Dogara (5th Right), Chairman Senate Committee on Appropriation, Senator Mohammed Danjuma Goje and other top government officials at the signing of the 2016 Budget in the office of the President, Abuja, Nigeria

Jibrin was first elected into the Nigerian National Assembly's House of Representatives representing Kiru/Bebeji Federal constituency of Kano State under the Peoples Democratic Party - PDP in 2011 before decamping to the newly formed political party in Nigeria, the All Progressives Congress (APC) in 2014 and was later re-elected into House of Representatives in 2015.

Jibrin was the Chairman House of Representatives Committee on Finance in the 7th Assembly with oversight on the Federal Ministry of Finance and its Parastatals, Federal Revenue, Preparation of Revenue framework/Estimate for the Federal budgets, Sovereign Wealth Fund - SWIA, Tax Matters, Fiscal matters, Government investment in banks and Statutory Corporations and Agencies, Insurance and Insurance of Government properties and assets amongst other functions. As the Chairman of the finance committee, he was a vocal voice on national matters. In 2015, Jibrin emerged as the 8th Assembly's House Committee on Appropriation Chairman until his resignation in July 2016 as the Committee Chairman.

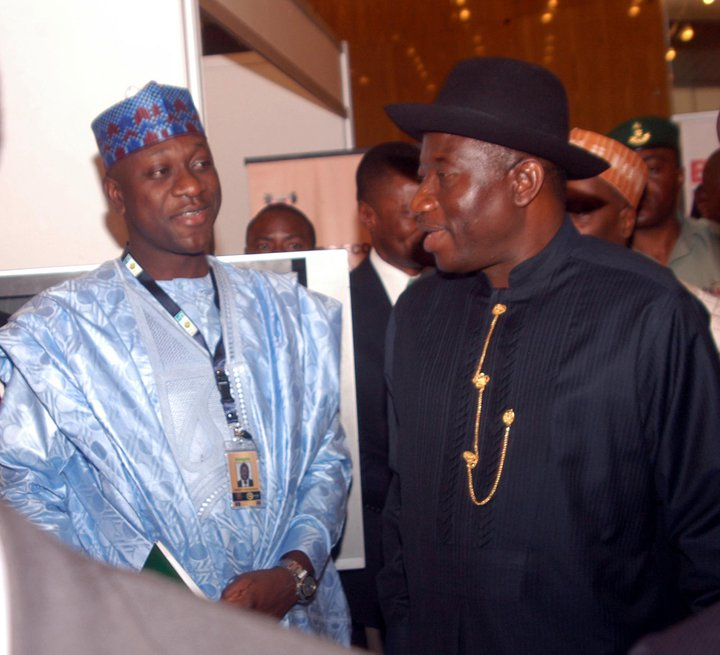
Jibrin with former Nigerian President, Goodluck Jonathan at the Nigerian Economic Summit Group event

Jibrin commenced his political journey while serving as Coordinator of Support Groups and later a Member of the PDP/Obasanjo Presidential Campaign between 2002–2003. He later served as Programme Officer at the PDP Presidential Campaign Headquarters in 2007.

No sooner had Jibrin got elected to the House of Representatives than he formed a group, called the 7th Assembly Group, which was made up of mostly the newly elected first-time lawmakers. The aim of the group according to Jibrin, as quoted in a national newspaper, was to serve as a "platform for members-elect to establish acquaintance and cross-fertilize ideas emanating from various constituencies for the overall interest of the country."

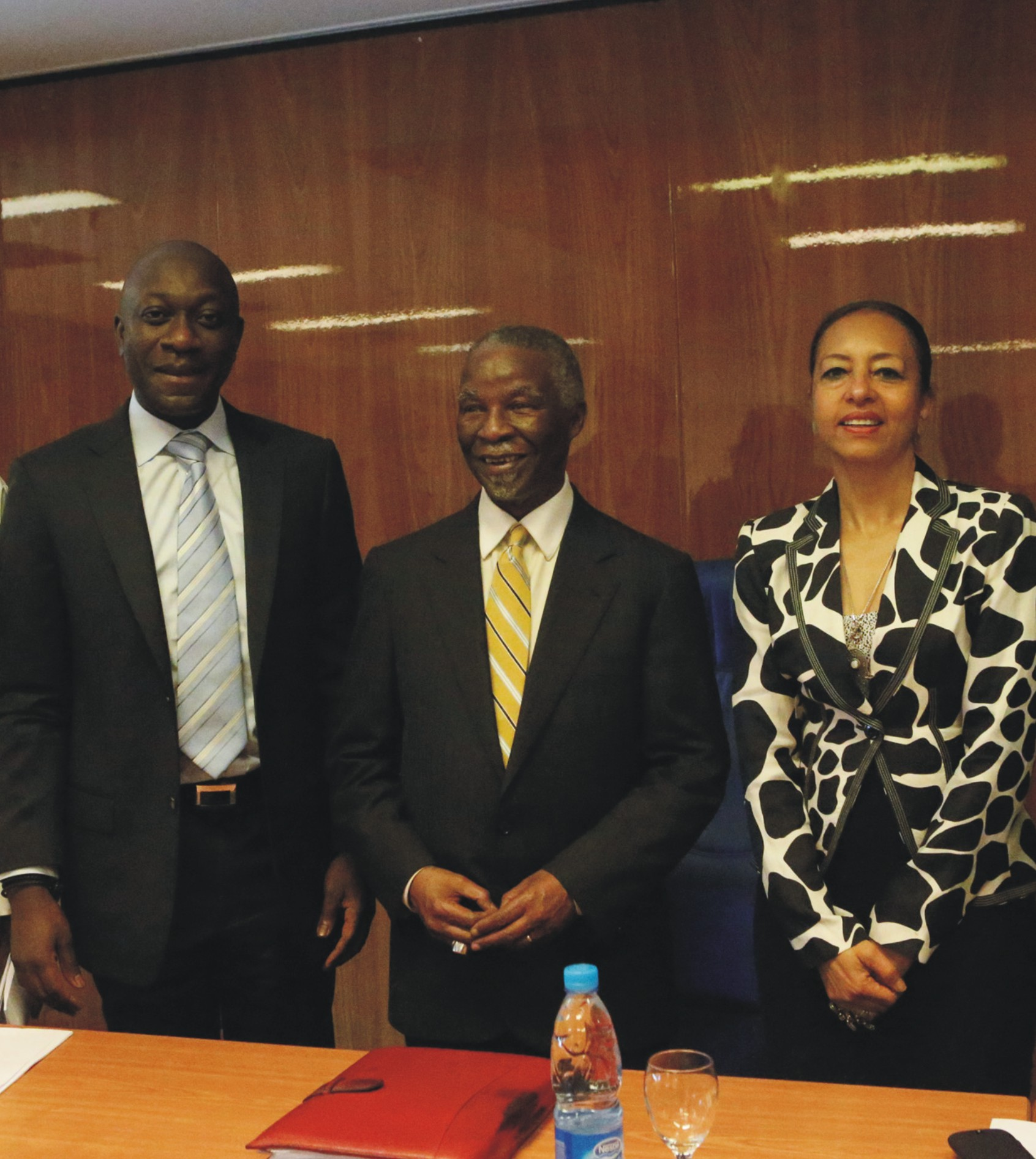
Jibrin with Former South African President & Chair UN/Africa Union High-Level Panel on Illicit Financial Flows from Africa, Mr. Thabo Mbeki & a member of the UN body, Ms. Zenuli ElBakri during a meeting in Abuja, Nigeria

Jibrin was appointed by the House of Representatives as the head of a joint ad hoc committee on Finance, Petroleum Upstream, Petroleum Downstream, and Gas Resources to investigate an alleged indebtedness of NNPC to the federation account in response to the continuing outcry by Nigerians for increasing accountability on the part of their governments. The investigation conducted by the Abdulmumin Jibrin-led joint committee later revealed a non-remittance of the sum of N450 billion by the NNPC to the federation account in contravention of Section 162 (1) of the 1999 constitution.

Jibrin has also expressed discontentment on Nigeria's over-dependence on oil and gas revenue. Apart from his position as the Chairman of House Committee on Finance, Jibrin has headed and co-chaired a number of parliamentary investigations and assignments which include but not limited to the following: investigation of independent revenue which deals with the internally generated revenue of corporations. Under Abdulmumin's leadership, the Finance Committee discovered billions of unremitted funds to the consolidated revenue fund and subsequently compelled the corporations to pay. The Committee on Finance under Jibrin further provided justification for the commencement of the Treasury Single Account policy (TSA) and the eventual and presentation of the budgets of some Statutory Agencies that runs into billions collectively from the Executive arm of government to the Legislature by President Muhammadu Buhari.

With the mandate of the House, Jibrin also led the Finance Committee to launch a comprehensive investigation into the Insurance industry and insurance of government assets and properties where wide-ranging discoveries were made bothering on issues of abuse of processes and existing laws. The Committee has commenced work to repeal and re-enact the existing insurance law. In the same vein, Abdulmumin proceeded to look into tax compliance and remittances by various sectors of the economy. Specifically, the Committee also commenced an investigation of tax compliance by banks. This will review the role of the banks as tax collecting agents and tax-payers.

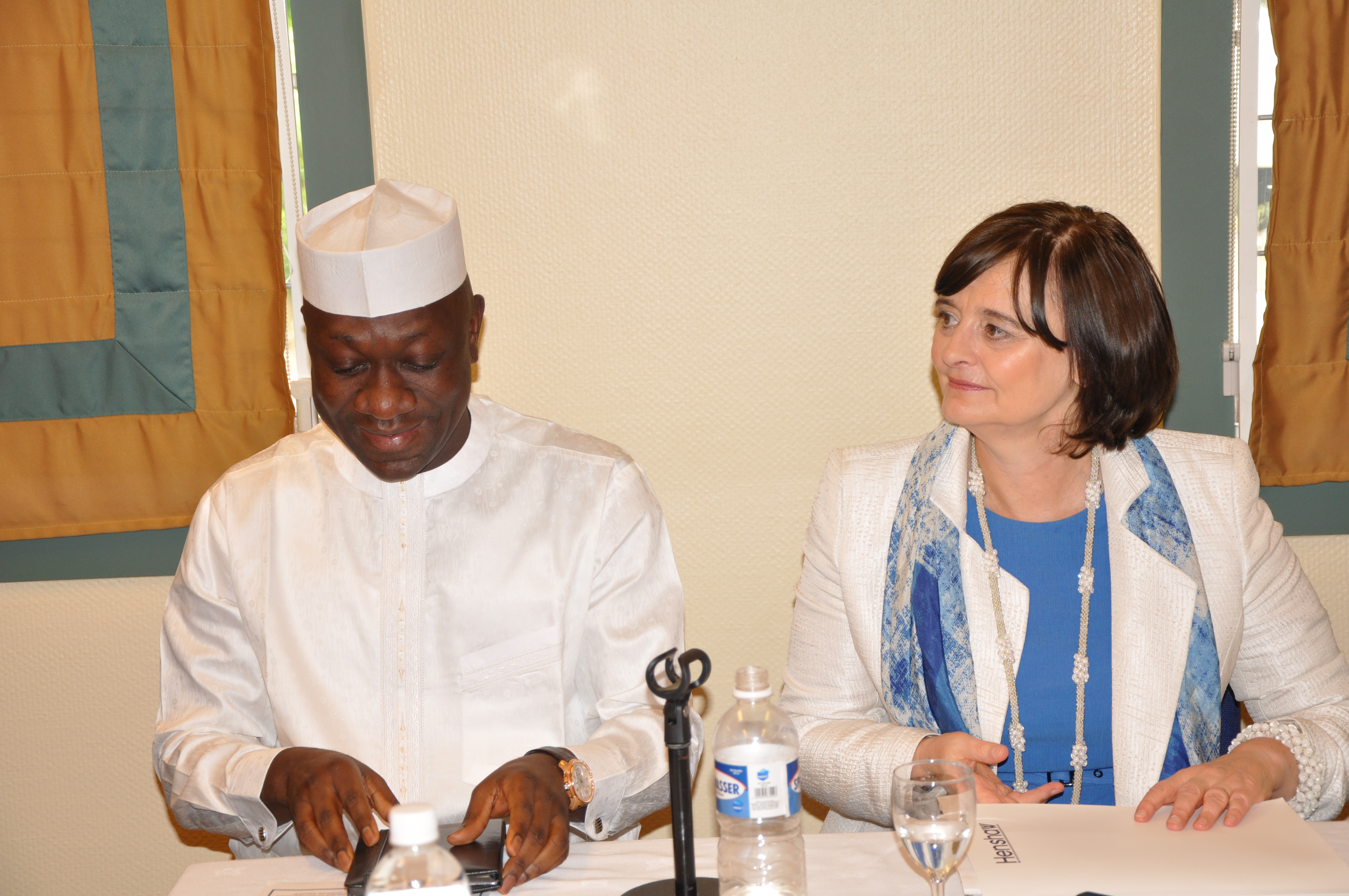
Jibrin with Mrs Cherie Blair at a Private Equity Seminar in Abuja

Abdulmumin has also co-chaired investigation on the planned liquidation of NITEL which used to be the largest telecommunication company in Nigeria, investigation on ports congestion, investigation on discretionary granting of waivers and other incentives by government for big companies, investigation into multi-billion naira housing fund and investigation on budget implementation among others.

Jibrin was also a member of the House Committee on Foreign Affairs, Gas, Electoral Matters, Youths Development, and Special Duties where he has contributed significantly to the works of these committees. Jibrin was the chair of the yearly joint committee that modifies the federal government Medium Term expenditure and Fiscal Strategy Paper (MTEF) which deals with all the macro-economic indices that serve as the fore-runner for Nigeria's national budget both between the period 2011–2015.

In 2013, Jibrin was one of the members of the House of Representatives that led the first set of 37 Legislators that decamped from the ruling People's Democratic Party (PDP) to the main opposition party, All Progressive Party (APC). In March 2015, Abdulmumin contested and got re-elected to the House of Representatives by the people of his constituency Kiru/Bebeji Kano state, Nigeria.

As Chairman of Appropriation, Jibrin has oversight function over the Budget office and national budget, the appropriation of funds for the execution of government programmes and projects. He also ensured that fiscal and budgetary policies of the government are aligned with the annual budget estimates and interrogated the fiscal, financial, and economic assumptions underpinning the total estimates of expenditure and receipts in the budget, the basic recommendations and budgetary policies of the President in the presentation of the budget, hold hearings, where testimony is received from the Minister of Finance, the Minister of Planning and Budget, the Governor of Central Bank, the Chairman of the National Economic Intelligence Agency and any such other persons as the Committee, may consider useful to its work, Coordinate, monitor and supervise the implementation of all Appropriation Acts after passage by the National Assembly, relating annual budget to rolling plans and Medium Term Expenditure Framework.

Also as Chairman of the Appropriations Committee, Jibrin is a member of the Joint Committee that modifies the Medium Term Expenditure Framework and Fiscal Strategy Paper (MTEF/FSP) of the 2016 budget. He also guided the process as Chairman of appropriation that led to the passage of the 2015 supplementary budget sent to the House by President Muhammadu Buhari. Jibrin is a member of Committees on Appropriations, Foreign Affairs, Sports, Intergovernmental Affairs, Electoral & Political Parties Matters, Ethics and Privileges, and Youth Development.

Jibrin sponsored a bill for an Act to repeal the Infrastructure Concession Regulatory Commission (Establishment) Act, 2005 and enact the Public-Private Partnership Regulatory Commission Act, 2016 to strengthen and enhance the supervisory role of the Commission and effectively position it in regulating the participation of the public and private sectors in enhancing construction, development, designing operation or maintenance of infrastructure or development projects of the Federal government through private partnership arrangements; and other matters related thereto (HB. 358)

In March 2012, Jibrin became the third Nigerian to be selected for participation in prestigious France's International Visitor Leadership Program organised by the French Government through the French Ministry of Foreign Affairs. Over one thousand promising leaders have participated in the program since its inception in 1989. Only nine percent of the participants were selected from Africa and only three from Nigeria. Jibrin used the opportunity of the programme to drum up attention to issues of development in Nigeria and emphasis increasing collaboration between Nigeria and France.

== Speakership contest ==
=== 2015 Speakership contest ===
In March 2015, Hon Abdulmumin Jibrin contested and got re-elected to the House of Representatives by the people of his constituency Kiru/Bebeji Kano state, Nigeria. He was an aspirant for the Speakership of the House but later stepped down for Hon Yakubu Dogara, who went on to win, and emerged Speaker of the 8th Assembly. Jibrin was the core-sponsor and the main-supporter of the Yakubu Dogara's 8th Assembly speakership aspiration that led to his emergence.

Speaker Dogara appointed Abdulmumin as the Chairman of the House of Representatives Committee on Appropriation. A position he held from 2015 until his resignation in 2016. A few months after his resignation, he was suspended by Dogara after a scandal in which he accused the leadership of the lower house of parliament of padding the annual budget and driving corruption. The suspension lasted for one legislative year, ending in March 2018 after Jibrin reportedly apologized to the House.

=== 2019 Speakership contest ===
In Nigeria's 2019 National Assembly elections, APC retained the control of the House of Representatives, picking 190 seats. Hon. Femi Gbajabiamila was chosen by the ruling party to become the 9th Assembly Speaker. On April 1, 2019, Femi Gbajabiamila's Speakership Campaign Organization named Hon Jibrin as its Director-General.

In his 5 minutes nomination speech, the lawmaker-elect for Kiru/Bebeji Federal Constituency of Kano State, Abdulmumin Jibrin described his candidacy as a progressive in the mold of the late sage, Chief Obafemi Awolowo, adding that Gbajabiamila was a man of the people with a proven track record.

Hon Femi Gbajabiamila, who has been a member of the House of Representatives since 2003, accepted Jibrin's nomination and on 11 April 2019 defeated his opponent, Hon Mohammed Umar Bago, with 283 votes.

=== Exit from the House ===
In January 2020, Jibrin lost his House of Representatives seat to the PDP's Ali Datti-Yako after a re-run was conducted in his federal constituency.

== Political appointments ==
Abdulmumin Jibrin was on 24 July 2020 appointed Executive Director of Business Development, Federal Housing Authority by President Muhammadu Buhari.

As Executive Director of the business development directorate, Jibrin will be in charge of Commercial, Social, and Corporate housing schemes assisted by departmental operational heads, namely:- General Manager (Housing Program), General Manager (Private partnership & Zonal Coordination), General Manager (Construction), General Manager (Property Management), General Manager (Pre-Projects), and General Manager (Quality Control).

== Interests ==
Beyond politics and his business engagements, Jibrin has a deep interest in philanthropy through which he instituted awards and yearly donations/lectures at the NYSC camps across Nigeria. He was the sole sponsor of his alma mater, University of Abuja reunion event. Jibrin has also provided needful equipment that would improve academic endeavors at the university and renovated some of the institution's academic buildings. He co-founded Lailife Foundation dedicated to the less privileged and also sits on the board of AYAHAY Foundation. a charity founded by his wife, Maryam Augie-Abdulmumin.

== Honours and awards ==
Jibrin has received several awards and honors for his meritorious achievements both in professional and public life. He has also been inducted into different professional bodies for his sterling contributions to professional practices in accordance with the global standards. In 2000, Jibrin was bestowed with the Award of Life Membership by the Students' Union Government, University of Abuja, Nigeria.

In 2009, the United Nations Global Peace Foundation award was conferred on Jibrin as a Peace Ambassador. He was a recipient of the Icon of Hope Award by the African-Caribbean Society of the University of Reading in 2010. He was also honored as a World Youth Ambassador by the Youth Federation for World Peace in 2010.

In 2012, Jibrin was inducted as Fellow Chartered Institute of Finance and Control by Nigeria CIFN. Also in the same year, he received an Award of Excellence for Best House Committee Chair by the Chartered Insurance Institute of Nigeria (CIIN). In November 2012, he was honored with an award for Legislative Excellence by the 7th National Assembly Media Merit Award. In early 2013, Jibrin was accorded the Distinguished Award for Contribution to National Development by the Nigeria Conservation, UK. Later in 2013, he was awarded a Certificate of Commendation for philanthropic Work by the Justice & Fairness Organisation, Kano State.

Jibrin was honored with the Most Outstanding National Committee Chair (Revenue Development) by the Disciples of Democracy in Frankfurt Germany in 2013 and in 2014 he was inducted as a fellow of the Institute of Mass Communication & Information Management of Nigeria and fellow of the Institute of Corporate Administration of Nigeria. For his philanthropy milestone, Jibrin was awarded a Paul Harris Fellow in 2012. Abdulmumin Jibrin holds the traditional title of Jarman Bebeji conferred on him by the Kano Emirate Council in November 2012.

== Family and personal life ==
Abdulmumin is married to Maryam Augie-Jibrin and they have four children. Jibrin has six siblings, two of which are medical doctors.
