= Alhassan Dantata =

Nigerian trader (1877–1955)

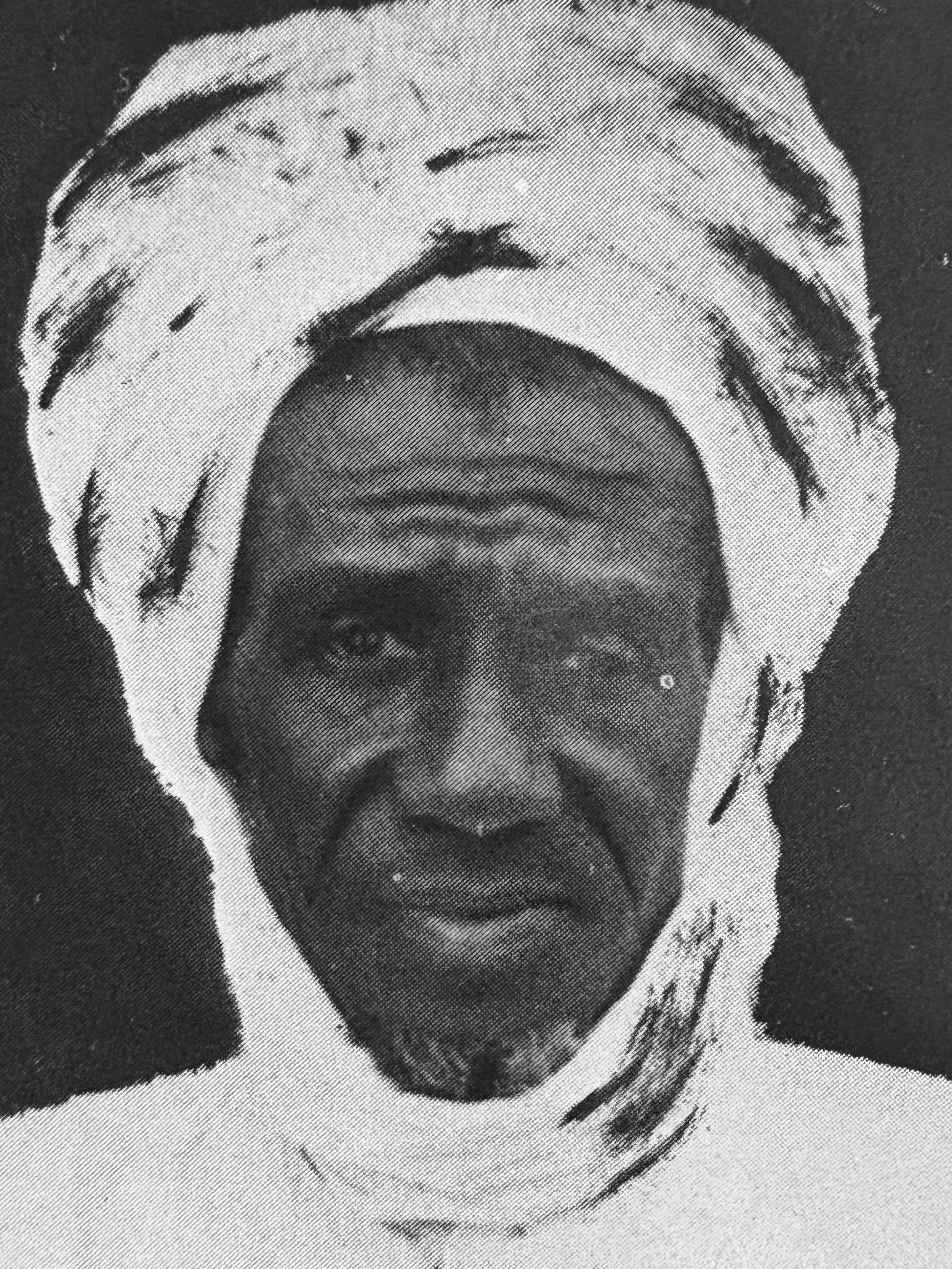
- Born: Alhassan Abdullahi; 1877; Bebeji, Kano Emirate, Sokoto Caliphate (present-day Bebeji, Kano State, Nigeria)
- Died: 17 August 1955 (aged 77–78); Kano, Northern Region, British Nigeria
- Resting place: Sarari ward of Kano
- Education: Madrasah in Bebeji
- Occupation: Merchant
- Political party: Northern People's Congress
- Spouse(s): Umma Zaria, Maimuna
- Children: Ahmadu; Sanusi; Mamuda; Aminu; Mudi (Sulaiman); Abdullahi; Amina (Yaawo); Bara'atu; Jamilu
- Relatives: Aliko Dangote (great-grandson through Sanusi)
- Family: Dantata family

Pronunciation of Alhassan Dantata

Alhassan Dantata (Arabic: ال حسان دان تاتا, romanized: al-Ḥasan ɗan Tātā; 1877 – 17 August 1955) was a Nigerian businessman and philanthropist. Through his trade with large British companies, he became one of the wealthiest men in West Africa during his time. He is the great-grandfather of Aliko Dangote, the wealthiest person in Nigeria and Africa.

== Early life ==
Dantata was born in 1877 in Bebeji, Kano Emirate. Both his parents were prosperous caravan leaders ('madugu') of Agalawa origin. The Agalawa were a group of long-distance traders who were formerly slaves of Tuareg nobles ('irelewen'). Dantata's father, Abdullahi, was a son of another prominent Agalawa merchant, Baba Talatin, who came from Katsina. Soon after Abdullahi's birth, Baba Talatin moved from Danshayi, a small village roughly fifteen kilometers from Kano, to Madobi. Following his father's practice, Abdullahi frequently travelled the Nupe and Gonja trade routes. He soon became a wealthy merchant through trading textiles, cattle, and slaves for kolanuts from the Akan forests in modern-day Ghana. Madobi continued to be Abdullahi's main base of operations until after Dantata's birth in 1877, when he permanently moved to Bebeji, a market and fortress town south of Kano. He likely died in 1885 and was buried at his Bebeji residence.

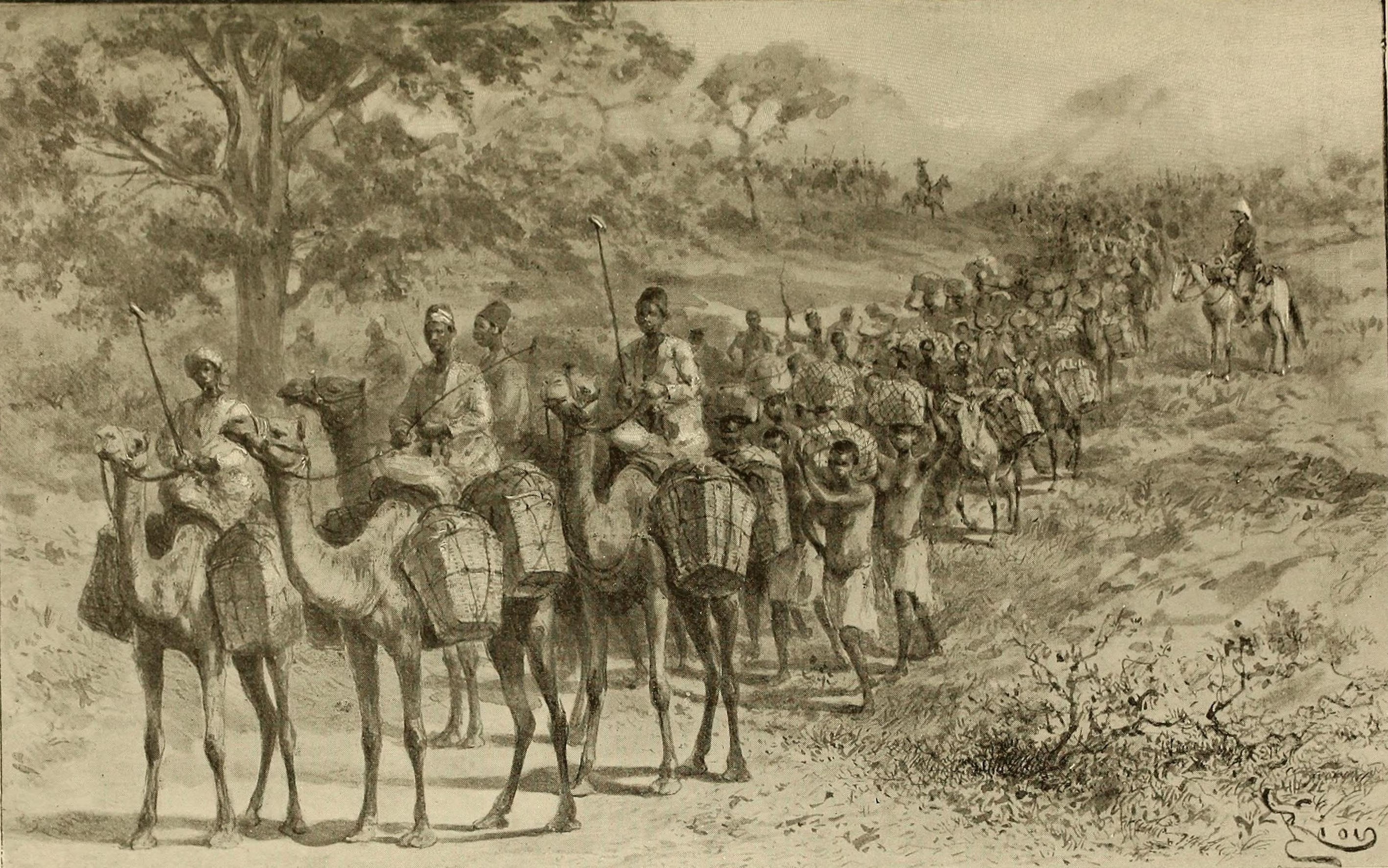
A Hausa caravan in 1895

Dantata's mother was also a "trader of no small consequence in the area". After Abdullahi's death, the widow was not able to remarry due to her considerable reputation. She eventually moved to Accra, at the time an important trading center in the British Gold Coast, leaving her children in the care of an old slave woman named Tata. Her role in raising him led to his nickname 'ɗan Tata', meaning "Tata's son."

After losing much of his inheritance from his father, Dantata began working to support himself while attending Qur'anic school. He was encouraged to save much of his money by Tata, even buying him an asusu (ceramic moneybox), which is still in possession of the Dantata family today. At about 15 years old, he joined a Gonja-bound caravan to visit his mother in Accra, hoping to rely on her wealth rather than having to support himself. However, a day after his arrival, she took him to a Mallam (Islamic teacher) and asked him to stay there until he was ready to return to Kano. During this period, Dantata lived as an almajiri. After his studies, he had to beg for food to sustain himself and his Mallam. On Thursdays and Fridays, Alhassan worked for money, of which he gave a significant portion to his Mallam.

Dantata was in Bebeji when the Kano Civil War (or the Basasa) broke out in 1893 and lasted until 1895. The conflict was between two rival claimants to the emirship, Tukur and Yusufu. Because the Agalawa supported Tukur, several settlements with large Agalawa communities, including Bebeji, were pillaged by the Yusufawa. The war ended after Aliyu, Yusufu's younger brother, succeeded in taking the throne. Consequently, several Agalawa merchants had their properties seized and lived in exile until after the British occupation of Kano a decade later. However, Dantata, along with his brothers Bala and Sidi, was unable to avoid capture and was sold into slavery.

Not much is known about Dantata's time in slavery, however, there are four different versions of the story according to historian Abdulkarim Umar Dan Asabe. The first account states that he was taken to Garko but redeemed himself after the war. The second suggests he immediately redeemed himself and Sidi using his existing wealth. According to the third account, he escaped capture and later redeemed his brother Bala in 1925. The final version claims that he escaped shortly after his capture, joined a Gonja-bound caravan, and returned to his mother in Accra. In 1914, by the order of the judicial council of Emir Muhammad Abbas, Dantata was able to reclaim his father's seized house in Bebeji.

== Career ==
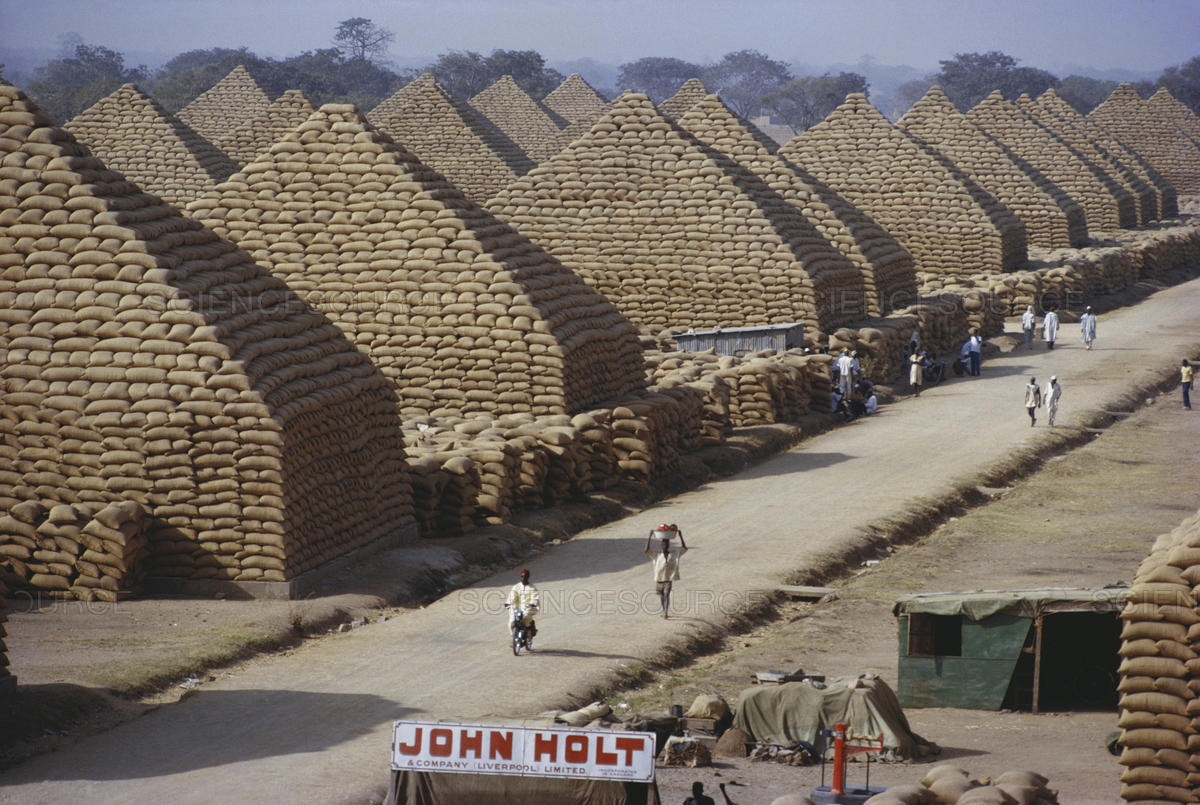
The groundnut pyramids were used as temporary storage for harvested groundnuts. During the mid-20th century, these structures were widely used in Northern Nigeria, particularly in Kano. Dantata was one of its earliest and most prolific adopters.

Dantata was in Bebeji when British troops invaded the Kano Emirate on February 1, 1903, conquering the town after its sarki was killed. He remained there until the roads were safe for travel. Then, he set out for the British Gold Coast, traveling through Ibadan and Lagos, and reached Accra by sea. Soon after, he began using this route to transport his kolanuts to Lagos, where he resold them to traders bound for Kano, becoming one of the first northern traders to use these routes commercially. In 1906, he diversified his trade by dealing in beads, necklaces, and European cloth. After his mother's death in 1908, he focused his trade on Kano and Lagos.

During this period, Dantata moved to Kano city and established a house in the Sarari ward, which was mostly empty at the time. With the expansion of groundnut production in British Northern Nigeria, the Niger Company (later part of the United Africa Company) started contacting established merchants in the region through the emir and their chief agent, Adamu Jakada. By 1918, after being approached by the company, Dantata had established a large network of agents and sub-agents to purchase groundnuts. His experience in coastal trade and basic knowledge of English gave him an advantage over other Kano merchants working with the company. His frugality and modest lifestyle enabled him to "accumulate capital rapidly". He soon became the Niger Company's largest supplier and, by 1922, one of the wealthiest men in Kano.

From 1926, Dantata utilised the newly established railway to promote cattle trade with Lagos and revitalized the kolanut trade with Western Nigeria. In 1929, when the Bank of British West Africa opened a branch in Kano, he famously deposited twenty camel-loads of silver coins, becoming the first Kano businessman to use a bank. By the 1940s, he bought and sold about 20,000 tons of groundnut in a year. During this period, Nigeria had become one of the world's leading groundnut producers, with Kano Province contributing almost half of the country's groundnut production.

In the early 1950s, with the assistance of the United Africa Company (UAC), he became a direct importer of consumer goods from Europe. He was the leading agent for the UAC and was advanced credit of up to £500,000 for crop purchase. In 1953, he became the first Nigerian licensed buying agent for the Northern Nigeria Marketing Board. He also became involved in transporting, direct importing, real estate, and the construction industry, working directly with the Native Administration. His three eldest sons, Ahmadu, Sanusi and Aminu, were in charge of land, building, contracting and transport sections of the business, with each backed by a separate organisation.

== Politics ==
In the late 1940s, Dantata helped establish the Kano Traders' General Conference, which eventually became the Amalgamated Northern Merchants' Union (ANMU) in the early 1950s. The ANMU received support from the Native Authorities of the region and the Northern Regional Government. The union was described as "[T]he spearhead of northern merchant nationalism".

In 1950, Abdullahi Bayero, Emir of Kano, appointed Dantata to the Kano Emirate Council to represent the merchant class and serve as an adviser on commercial matters. Dantata, the only Hausa member in the historically Fulani-dominated council, was seen as the Emir's effort to address concerns regarding the lack of Hausa representation in the council and other high positions in the Native Administration.

During the 1950s and 1960s, the Northern People's Congress (NPC), the most dominant political party in Northern Nigeria at the time, was widely supported by the region's elites, including the Dantata family who were among the party's most active supporters. However, Dantata's two sons, Aminu and Mahmudu, were known members of the Northern Elements Progressive Union (NEPU), a socialist party that was the NPC's biggest opposition in the North. Dantata pressured his sons to join the NPC instead, as, according to Aminu, "My father would not take it kindly to see his son fighting the system." Aminu later joined the NPC and was elected to the Northern House of Assembly, while Mahmud joined the party later in the 1960s and was elected to the Federal Parliament in 1964, contesting against and defeating NEPU's leader Aminu Kano. Ahmadu, an NPC member and Dantata's oldest son, also contested against and defeated Aminu Kano in the 1956 election for the Northern House of Assembly.

== Philanthropy ==
Dantata made a pilgrimage (hajj) to Mecca via boat in the 1920s. On this trip, he also went to England and was presented to George V. In 1927, he sponsored 16 persons for pilgrimage to Mecca, including his Mallam from when he lived as an almajiri in Accra in the early 1890s. He continued this practice throughout his life and encouraged his children to carry on the tradition. His son, Aminu, and his grandchildren, like Mariya Sanusi Dantata, as well as his great-grandchildren, including Aliko Dangote, still finance the pilgrimages of other Muslims to Mecca yearly.

Dantata was known to slaughter a herd of cattle for the poor each year during Eid al-Kabir.

== Death ==
In 1955, Dantata became seriously ill. Recognising the seriousness of his illness, he summoned his chief financial controller of 38 years, Garba Maisikeli, and his children. He told them that his days were nearing their end and advised them to live together. He was particularly concerned about the company he had established, Alhassan Dantata & Sons, urging them to ensure it did not collapse. He asked them to continue marrying within the family as much as possible and urged them to avoid clashes with other wealthy Kano merchants. He also told them to take care of their relatives, especially the poor among them. Three days later, on Wednesday, 17 August 1955, he died in his sleep. He was buried in his house in the Sarari ward.

Because Dantata scarcely kept any records and only used a bank when his transactions required it, no one knew with any degree of certainty how much he was worth. After his death, his only safe contained a checkbook for each of the two Kano banks, with balances totaling less than £30. With the help of his family, some of his wealth was identified by the Kano Native Administration, amounting to around £350,000 in Northern Nigeria alone, before they abandoned the search. Later estimates indicate that, he left more than a third of a million pounds, mostly in cash.

== Descendants ==
Some descendants of Alhassan Dantata include:

- Ahmadu Dantata (1916–1960): son; businessman and politician; managing director of Alhassan Dantata & Sons Company; member of the Northern House of Assembly from 1956 to 1960.
- Sanusi Dantata (1917–1997): son; businessman; founder of Sanusi Dantata & Sons Company.
  - Abdulkadir Dantata (1946–2012): grandson; businessman; founder of Asada Farms and co-founder of Dantata & Sawoe Construction Company.
  - Usman Dantata: grandson; businessman; founder of Anadariya Farms.
  - Mariya Dantata: granddaughter; philanthropist.
    - Aliko Dangote (born 1957): great-grandson; businessman; founder of Dangote Group; Africa's richest man.
- Sulaiman Dantata (1916–1960): son.
- Mahmud Dantata (1922–1983): son; businessman and politician; managing director of the West African Pilgrims Association and Hajair; member of the Federal Parliament from 1964 to 1966.
- Aminu Dantata (1931–2025): son; businessman and politician; member of the Northern House of Assembly from 1960 to 1966.
- Jamil Dantata: son; politician; member of the Action Group.
