= Aliko Dangote =

Nigerian businessman (born 1957)

Aliko Dangote GCON
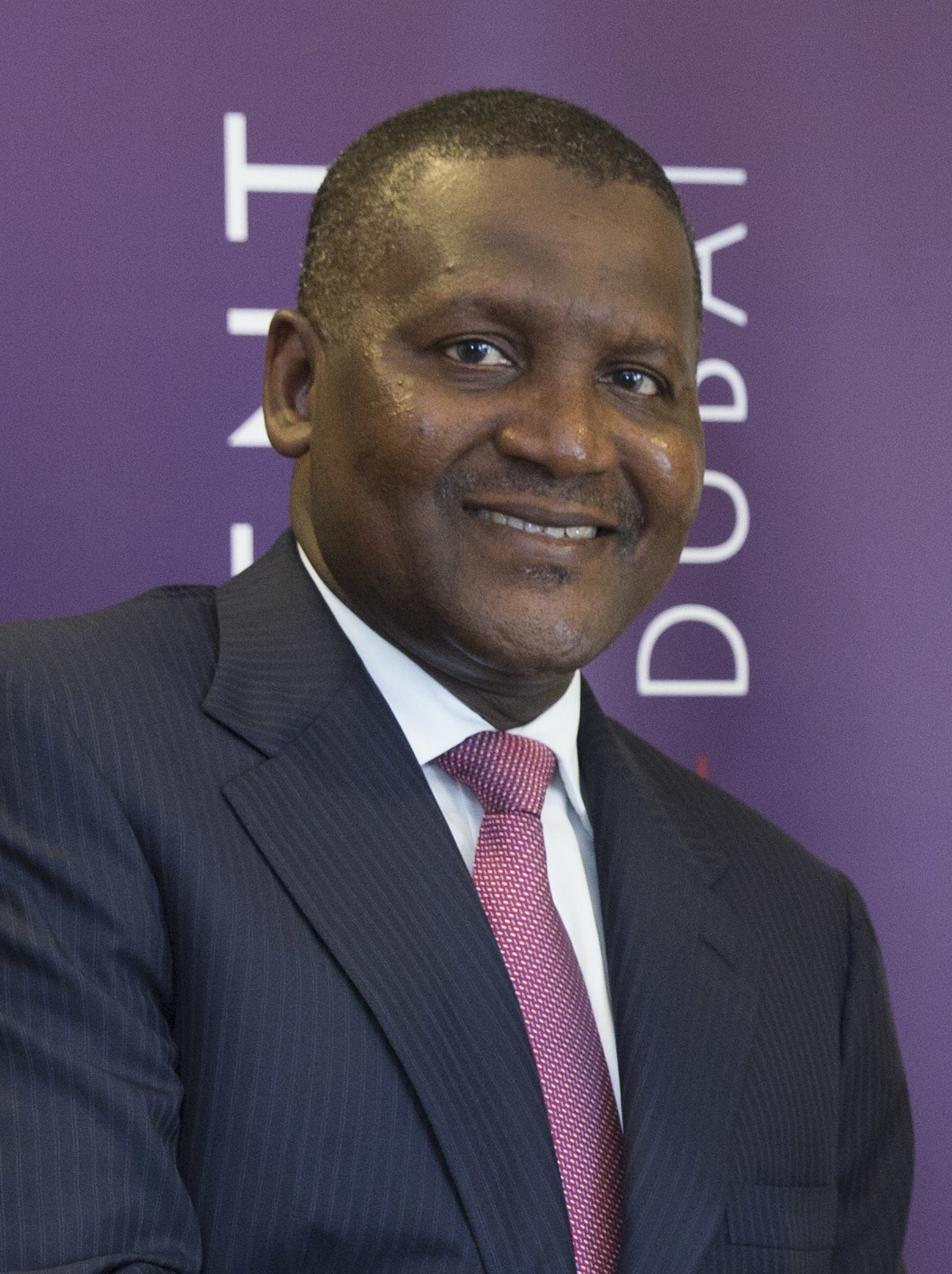
- Dangote in 2014
- Born: Aliko Mohammad Dangote; 10 April 1957 (age 69); Kano, Nigeria
- Education: Al-Azhar University (BSc)
- Occupation: Businessman
- Years active: 1977–present
- Title: Founder of Dangote Group
- Spouses: Zainab Dangote (m. 1977, divorced) Mariya Muhammad Rufai (divorced)
- Children: 4
- Relatives: Dantata family
- Awards: Full list

Aliko Dangote GCON (born 10 April 1957) is a Nigerian billionaire businessman known for his key roles in Dangote Group. In 2011, he was appointed as member of the economic management team by President Goodluck Jonathan. As of August 13, Dangote is the 35th wealthiest individual in the world, the wealthiest black individual and the wealthiest individual in Africa, with a net worth estimated at over US$51.7 billion per Forbes and Bloomberg.

In 1977, Dangote founded the Dangote Group, a small company that traded commodities; importing sugar, salt, and food products. In 1981, he founded Dangote Nigeria Limited and Blue Star Services; both imported rice, and bulk materials like steel and aluminum products. Following the large sales by the company, and high demand for cement, Dangote founded Dangote Cement, which faced competition from Lafarge, a French cement manufacturing company known for importing cement to African countries during that period. As of 2023, Dangote Cement has generated about $3.7 billion in revenue, and Dangote Sugar Refinery has been ranked as one of the largest sugar producers in Nigeria and Africa.

Dangote's political activities and views have made him a public figure in Africa. He is also known for his influence on the Economy of Nigeria and was awarded the Grand Commander of the Order of the Niger in 2011 by Goodluck Jonathan and listed in Time magazine's 100 most influential people in the world in 2014.

== Early life ==
=== Family ===
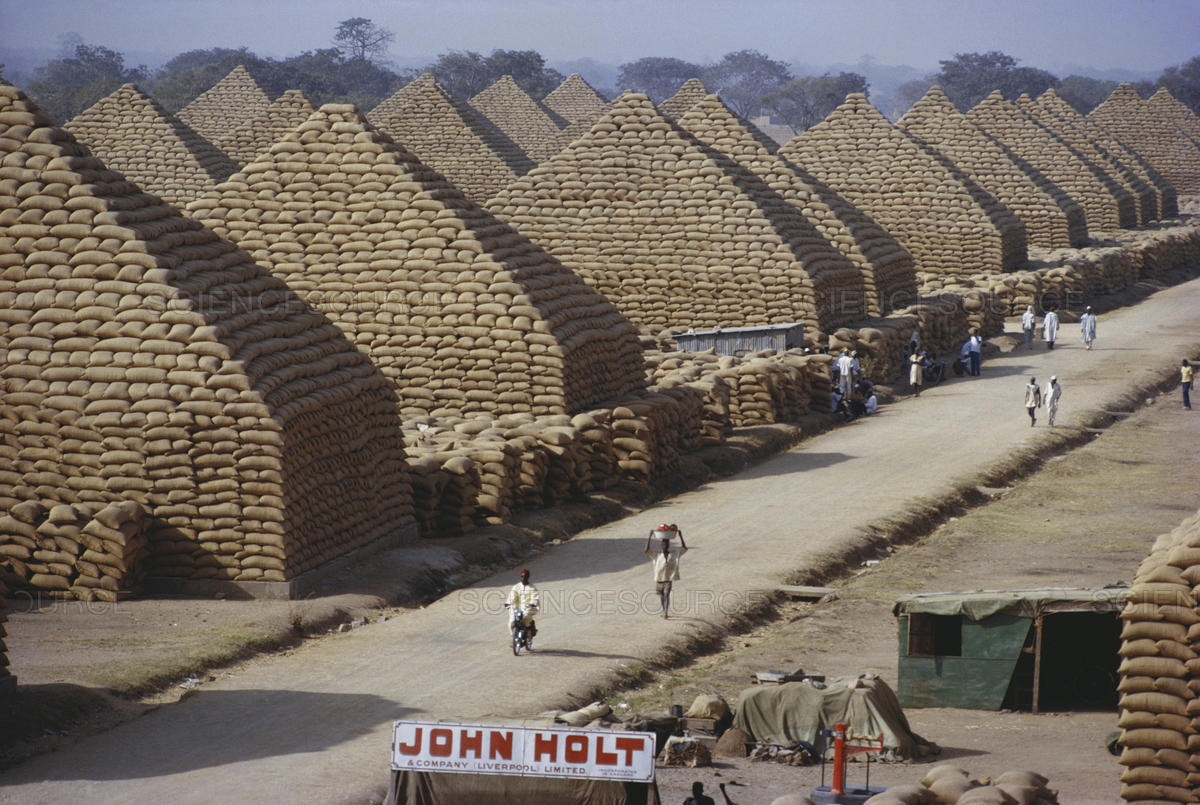
Groundnut pyramids used as storage for groundnuts. During the mid-20th century, these structures were used in Northern Nigeria, particularly in Kano. His maternal great-grandfather, Alhassan Abdullahi Dantata, supplied groundnuts to the Royal Niger Company, and was one of its earliest and most prolific adopters.

Aliko Mohammad Dangote was born on 10 April 1957, in Kano, Kano State, British Nigeria. His name "Aliko" was given to him by his maternal grandfather, Sanusi Dantata; it means "the victorious one who defends humanity".

Born to a prominent Nigerian family, Dangote is of Hausa descent. Raised a Muslim, he was educated in a Madrasa and completed his primary education in a public school.

His mother, Mariya (née Dantata), from a wealthy family, was a businesswoman and philanthropist. His father Mohammed Dangote was also a businessman; he owned a transport company.

Aliko had three siblings: Sani Dangote, a businessman who died of colorectal cancer; Bello, who died in a 1996 plane crash alongside the son of Sani Abacha; and Garba, who died in 2013 after a stroke.

Dangote's family were influential business people. His maternal great-grandfather, Alhassan Abdullahi Dantata, was the richest person in West Africa until his death in 1955. During his business career, Alhassan imported kola nuts from Ghana, and exported groundnuts abroad. (Note: Groundnuts and peanuts were Nigeria's major export produce until the discovery of crude oil in the 1950s.) After Dangote's father died in 1965, he donated his inheritance to charity. He regards his maternal grandfather, Sanusi, and his maternal uncle, Usman Amaka Dantata, as influential paternal figures in his upbringing.

=== Education ===
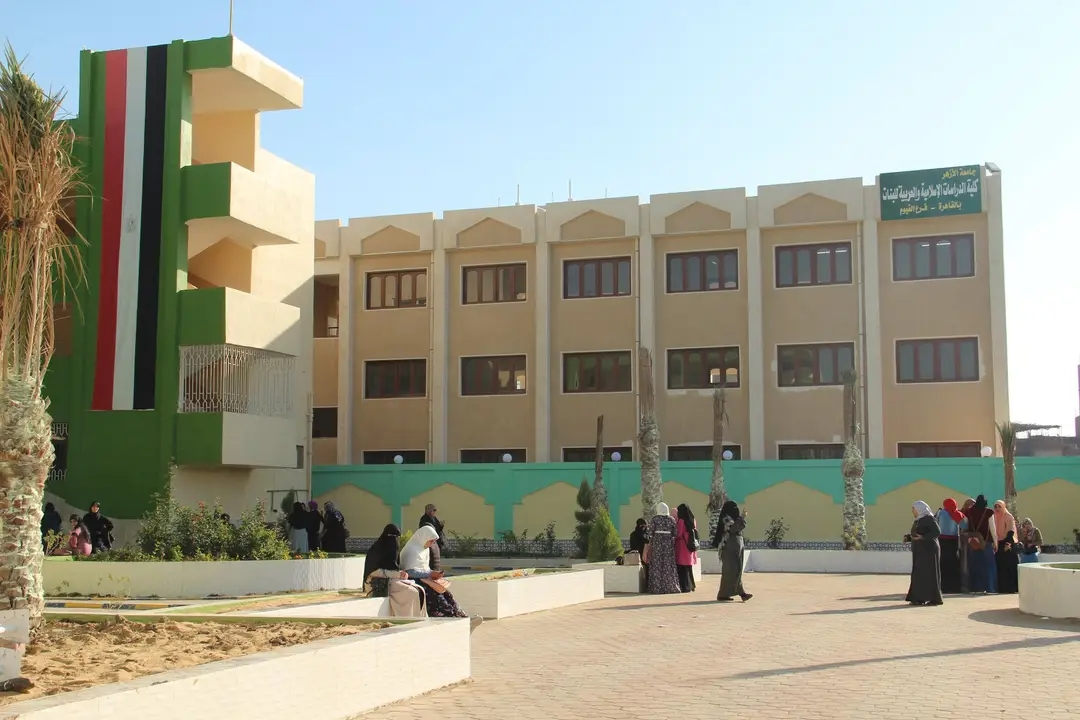
Dangote had his university education at Al-Azhar University in Cairo

Dangote was educated at Sheikh Ali Kumasi Madrasa for his primary school and later finished at Capital High School in Kano. In 1978, he graduated from the Government College, Birnin Kudu, where he had his secondary education.

He left Nigeria for Egypt after his secondary education, and studied at Al-Azhar University in Cairo, Egypt. He graduated with a bachelor's degree in business studies and administration, before returning to Lagos to pursue business ventures.

== Business career ==
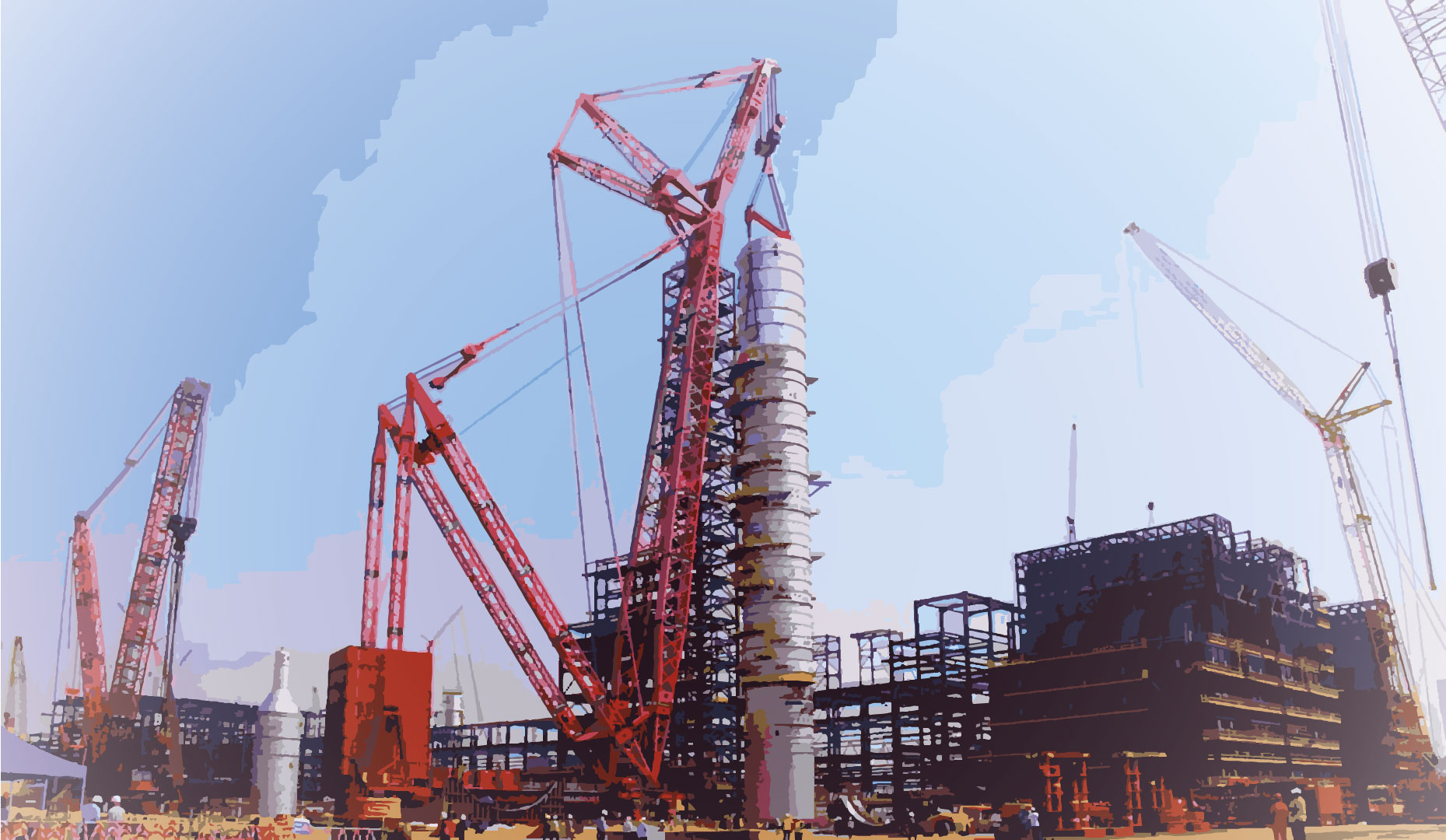
Distillation column at Dangote Refinery

Dangote launched his first business venture with a loan of $3,000 from his uncle. He initially traded in food products and has credited his early entrepreneurial instincts to selling boiled sugar sweets to classmates at the age of eight, retaining the profits for himself.

In the mid-to-late 1970s, during the period known as the Nigerian Cement Armada—when the government authorized the importation of approximately 16 million metric tons of cement for infrastructure and development projects—Dangote obtained an import license and expanded his business to include cement. However, logistical challenges led to numerous cement-laden ships being stranded at the Lagos harbor, while some reportedly sank. Importers were compensated with demurrage fees for the delays.

During this time, Dangote acquired a fleet of trucks and established a cargo transportation business, which he also used to distribute his cement products.

In 1977, Dangote's company produced pasta, salt, sugar, and flour. In 1981, he expanded his company into a conglomerate, which traded textiles, sugar, flour, salt, oil and gas, and real estate. He stayed in Atlanta, Georgia before returning to Nigeria to start his cement business in 1998. His sugar refinery in Lagos became the second largest in the world. Dangote Group has been considered to be one of the largest conglomerates in Africa. In 2000, after his friend Olusegun Obasanjo won the 1999 Nigerian presidential election, the Nigerian government privatized Benue Cement Company (BCC), a now defunct state-owned company in Gboko, Benue State, allowing Dangote to expand his cement business in Benue. Dangote's Obajana cement plant in Kogi State became the largest cement plant in Sub-Saharan Africa. In 2010, the group acquired part of South Africa's Sephaku Cement.

In July 2012, Dangote's request to the Nigerian Ports Authority to lease abandoned land at Apapa Port Complex was approved. In February 2022, he announced the completion of the Peugeot assembling facility in Nigeria following his partnership with Stellantis, the company manufacturing Peugeot. Dangote became the owner of Dangote Refinery, the largest oil refinery in Africa. It was commissioned in 2023.

== Political activities ==
Dangote's business interests and philanthropic efforts extend to African countries such as Benin, Cameroon, Ghana, Nigeria, South Africa, and Togo.

=== Nigeria ===
Dangote was a key supporter of his friend President Olusegun Obasanjo's re-election campaign in 2003. He contributed over N200 million to the campaign. In 2011, he was appointed by President Goodluck Jonathan as a member of his Economic Management Team.

Dangote was named as an adviser to President Muhammadu Buhari's reelection campaign of the 2019 Nigerian presidential election. Femi Otedola was listed also, however, spokesmen for both didn't respond to calls and requests for comments. Dangote donated ₦150 million to help combat the Ebola outbreak in 2014. In 2020, he donated ₦200 million to support the fight against COVID-19 pandemic.

Dangote's conglomerate maintains a dominant position in Nigeria's cement and sugar industries, where competitors often struggle to contend with his extensive resources and perceived government-backed advantages. The establishment of his oil refinery in Lagos has sparked concerns over potential monopolization of the fuel supply, with critics warning of increased prices and diminished market competition. These concerns have been amplified by reports of alleged government concessions, including tax exemptions, granted to the refinery.

== Ventures outside Nigeria ==
=== Kenya ===
In May 2025, Dangote, through his backed Africa Travel Investments acquired one of the oldest tourism firms in Kenya, Pollman’s Tours and Safaris for KES 4 billion

=== South Africa ===
His company Dangote Cement entered into a joint venture with JSE-listed Sephaku Holdings to build and manage Sephaku Cement in South Africa. It is among South Africa's largest cement manufacturers. Dangote Cement owns 64% of the project.

=== Benin ===
Dangote's business interests extend to Benin Republic, where he has invested in his cement business. His company, Dangote Cement, has established a cement plant in Benin.

=== Ghana ===
In Ghana, Dangote established a cement plant in Ghana and has supported import of cement and other commodities.

=== Ethiopia and Djibouti ===
In September 2026, Dangote announced the funding of a fuel pipeline and storage capacity between Dewele, Ethiopia and Damerjog Port in Djibouti.

== Criticisms ==
In a 2014 Op-ed on Vanguard News, former Director General of the Nigerian Broadcasting Service Sa'adatu Modibbo Kawu questioned Dangote's source of income. He wrote that Dangote benefits from Nigeria's market especially after the country's transition to civil rule. He cites the National Bureau of Statistics of Nigeria writing that many Nigerians have gotten poorer. While criticising Forbes for celebrating Dangote, he called it "an uber-capitalist magazine".

Dangote was alleged to have supported Obasanjo's presidential election in 1999, hence, Obasanjo provided him with "exclusive" import rights of cement, sugar, and rice. In a dated 2007 diplomatic cable that appeared on WikiLeaks in 2011, the US consul general in Lagos Brian Browne suggested that Dangote was given preferential treatment in exchange for funding Obasanjo's reelection campaign in 2003. Dangote dismissed the claim.

== Personal life ==
In 1977, at the age of twenty, Dangote married Zainab, who was chosen by his parents in accordance with local customs. The couple had two daughters, Maria and Halima. They later divorced, although the exact date is not known. At an unspecified date, he entered into a second marriage with Mariya Muhammad Rufai, the daughter of the former Bauchi State Commissioner for Women Affairs and Human Services. This union produced one daughter, Fatima. The marriage ended in divorce in 2017. According to Nigerian website Legit.ng, unlike Dangote, his ex-wives hate publicity, which may be the reason there is little information about them in the media.

Dangote has four children; three daughters and an adopted son, Abdulrahman, and five grandchildren.

Dangote was a member of President Jonathan's economic management team and job creation committee in 2011. Also in November of the same year, he was awarded the Grand Commander of the Order of the Niger, the second highest honour in Nigeria. He was the first nongovernmental figure to receive the distinction.

In 2012 and 2013, he sued Cletus Ibeto citing that Ibeto Cement receives illegal tax breaks. He is a philanthropist and along with his foundation, Dangote Foundation, has reportedly contributed to the social and education sector of Nigeria; in 2011, he reportedly gave $60 to each displaced person as a result of the violence in 2011 Nigerian presidential election.

== Wealth ==
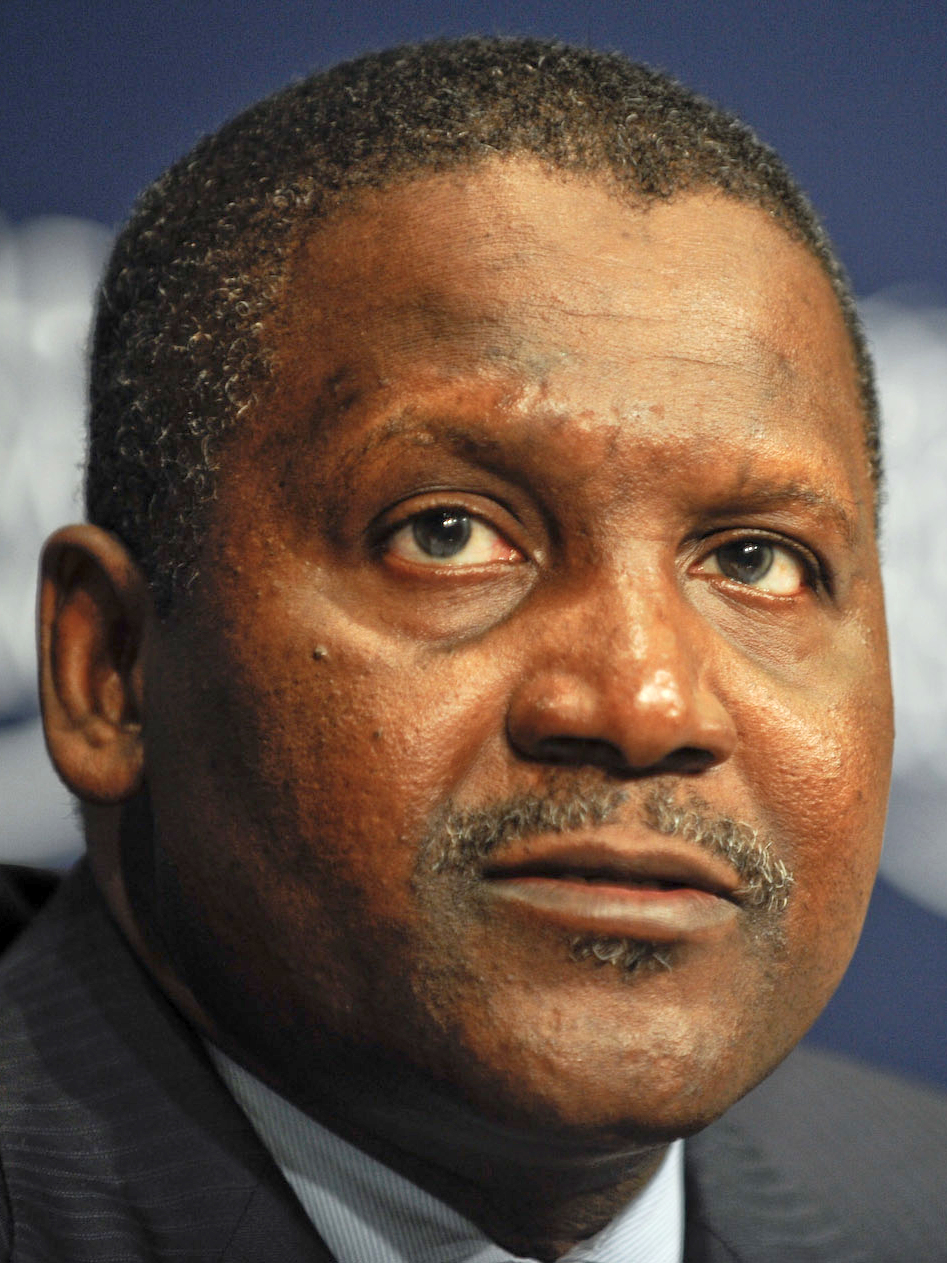
Dangote during the Fellowship Programme with Young Global Leaders announcement at the African World Economic Forum in Cape Town, South Africa, 2011

Aliko Dangote is the wealthiest person in Africa, with an estimated net worth of US$39.4 billion as of 31 October 2026, according to the Bloomberg Billionaires Index, and $55.4 billion according to Forbes, primarily from his oil refinery, cement and sugar business.

Having been first listed on the Forbes Billionaires List in 2008, with a net worth of $3.3 billion. His wealth dropped by 2009 to $2.5 billion, and subsequently, $2.1 billion in 2010. His wealth increased to $13.8 billion in 2011 after he founded the Dangote Cement. Dangote hold a share of 86 percent of Dangote Cement as well as in other traded holding like NASCON Allied Industries, Dangote Sugar, and the United Bank for Africa. According to Nairametrics, his wealth decreased by over $1 billion in 2024 as a result of naira's low market value and moderation in the value of his equity holdings. By September 2024, Dangote regained his position as the richest man in Africa after having been previously surpassed by Johann Rupert in January of the same year.

== Legacy ==
Dangote became the first billionaire in Nigeria in 2007. In 2012 The Guardian wrote that he is the richest man in Africa and the richest black man in the world." According to Nigerian newspaper Vanguard, the Bloomberg Billionaires Index reports that Dangote's wealth increased by $9.2 billion in 2013. The 2015 Swiss Leaks revealed that he was a client of the British university Bank, HSBC, thereby having assets in the British Virgin Islands.

While serving as a member of NEMT, (Note: TNEMT is an account meaning the National Economic Management Team.) Dangote was awarded the Grand Commander of the Order of the Niger (GCON) (Note: GCON is the second highest honor given in Nigeria.) by President Goodluck Jonathan in 2011. He was the first non government official to receive the distinction. In April 2014, Time listed him among its 100 most influential people in the world. In 2015 Dangote was listed among "50 Most Influential Individuals in the World" by Bloomberg, the Guardian Man of the Year award, and was cited as one of the top 100 most influential Africans by London-based magazine, New African.

Dangote was named co-chair of the US-Africa Business Center in September 2016 by the United States Chamber of Commerce. he was appointed as the Chairman of the Nigeria End Malaria Council by Buhari in August 2022.

== Recognition, awards and honours ==
Dangote was appointed by Goodluck Jonathan as member of his economic management team in 2011. In 2017, he denied the alleged run for Nigerian president in the 2019 election, and served on the special advisory committee for the reelection campaign of Muhammadu Buhari.

Dangote has worked alongside the Gates Foundation on public health issues. In August 2014, he donated 150 million naira to assist the Nigerian government's efforts of treating and preventing Ebola. In May 2016 he pledged $10 million to support Nigerians affected by the Boko Haram insurgency. In March 2020, he donated 200 million naira to fight against the spread of COVID-19 in Nigeria.

Dangote is a fan of English football team Arsenal F.C. and showed interest in buying the club in 2019. In 2020, he made a donation to Nigeria's ministry of sports in order to help renovate the Moshood Abiola National Stadium in Abuja.

- In 2011, Dangote was awarded Nigeria's second-highest honour, the Grand Commander of the Order of the Niger by President Goodluck Jonathan
- 2021 Lifetime Achievement Award from the Nigeria Employers Consultative Association. He also received it in 2023
- In 2011, he was the first Nigerian to debut and be profiled on Forbes World's Billionaires list.
- 2012 Ernst & Young Entrepreneur of the Year Award
- 2024 Sabistation Business Owners Awards
- 2024 recipient of the National Order of the Lion by President Macky Sall
- 2022 recipient of the Order of Merit of Niger award by President Mohamed Bazoum
- Economic Confidential's CEO of the year, 2024
- In 2020, Dangote's group won the CNN commercial's award

== See also ==
- The World's Billionaires
- Lists of people by net worth

== Sources ==
- Iheka, Cajetan N. (2011). Dangote, Aliko. England: Oxford University Press. ISBN 9780199857258.
- Wilson, H. W. (7 January 2015). Current Biography Yearbook-2014. H. W. Wilson. ISBN 978-1-61925-430-5.
