= Sani Dangote =

Nigerian businessman (1960–2021)

- Born: 1960 (age 65–66); Kano, Nigeria
- Died: November 14, 2021 (aged 60–61); Weston, Florida, United States
- Resting place: Kano, Nigeria
- Occupation: Businessman
- Known for: Vice President of Dangote Group
- Children: 8
- Relatives: Dantata family

Sani Dangote (1959/60 – 14 November 2021) was a Nigerian businessman. He was the younger brother of the wealthiest person in Africa, Aliko Dangote and vice president of the family-run Dangote Group.

== Personal life ==
Dangote had a wife and eight children, in addition to three brothers: Aliko, Bello, who died in a plane crash alongside the son of the military head of state Sani Abacha in 1996; and Garba, who died in 2013 after a stroke.

== Legal issues ==
In September 2014, 20 of Dangote's bank accounts were temporarily frozen by the High Court of Lagos State after an alleged failure to pay back a ₦5.2 billion loan from the Union Bank of Nigeria for his companies Dansa Foods Limited and Bulk Pack Services Limited. Union Bank asserted that he had been pressuring banks into honouring cheques to deplete the funds and divert them to foreign banks in Canada, Switzerland and the UAE to avoid paying the debt. In 2015, Union Bank took steps toward seizing Dansa Foods Limited and its assets. In 2016, the Asset Management Corporation of Nigeria took over both companies to help pay off the debts.

In August 2018, Dangote was implicated in a lawsuit against his company, MPS Nigeria Limited, by an Italian contractor after an alleged breach of contract. Being accused of fraud, Dangote was alleged to not have paid salaries and to have withheld the contractor's passport for two years. The case was dismissed by the court due to inconsistent evidence. The contractor's passport was returned two months later in October after intervention from Nigerian authorities.

== Illness and death ==
Before his death, Dangote travelled to the United States to receive treatment for colon cancer. On 14 November 2021, at the age of 61, he died from the illness at Cleveland Clinic in Weston, Florida. His funeral, initially set to take place on 16 November in Kano, was delayed until the 17th due to paperwork issues resulting in his body not being returned to Nigeria. After prayers were held at the palace of the emir of Kano, he was buried at a family estate in Kano. Present at his burial were his brother Aliko, two previous senate presidents Ahmad Lawan and Bukola Saraki, and governor of Borno State Babagana Umara Zulum, among others.
