= Aminu Dantata =

Nigerian businessman and philanthropist (1931–2025)

Alhaji Aminu Dantata CON

Kano State Commissioner for Planning and Development
- In office 1967–1972
- Governor: Audu Bako
- Preceded by: position established
- Succeeded by: Baba Ɗan Baffa

Member of the Northern House of Assembly from Kano
- In office 1960–1966
- Succeeded by: position abolished
- Constituency: Kura

Personal details
- Born: Aminu Alhassan Dantata; 19 May 1931 Kano, Northern Region, Colony and Protectorate of Nigeria (now in Kano State, Nigeria)
- Died: 28 June 2025 (aged 94) Abu Dhabi, United Arab Emirates
- Party: National Party of Nigeria (1978–1984)
- Other political affiliations: Northern People's Congress (1959–1966); Northern Elements Progressive Union (before 1959)
- Spouse: Rabi Ɗantata (died 2023)
- Parent: Alhassan Dantata (father)
- Relatives: Dantata family
- Occupation: Businessman; philanthropist

Aminu Alhassan Dantata (19 May 1931 – 28 June 2025) was a Nigerian businessman and philanthropist who was one of the promoters of Kano State Foundation, an endowment fund that supported educational initiatives and provided grants to small-scale entrepreneurs in Kano. He was the head of a group of companies that managed his real estate and other business ventures.

Aminu Alhassan Dantata was the founder of Express Petroleum & Gas Company Ltd and one of the organizers of Jaiz Bank in Nigeria. In 1978, he was a member of the National Movement, an organization that later transformed to the National Party of Nigeria.

== Background ==
Dantata was born into the family of Alhassan Dantata, who was from an Agalawa trading family, Aminu Dantata's grandfather was called Abdullahi while his great-grandfather was called Baba Talatin, a prosperous merchant who brought the family from Katsina to Madobi following the death of his father Ali. Aminu Dantata's grandfather Abdullahi continued to operate from Madobi until 1877 when having set out for a journey to Gonja his wife delivered Alhassan Dantata, the father of Aminu at a campsite (Zango) of Bebeji. On his return from the journey he decided to abandon Madobi and moved to Bebeji. Aminu Dantata was the fifteenth child in a family of seventeen children. From 1938 to 1945, he was educated at Dala Primary School and then finished his education through home studies in a private school built by his father in 1949. After his studies, he joined the family business, Alhassan Dantata & sons, in 1948 as a produce buyer and also got married. In 1955, he became the Sokoto district manager of the business. The year 1955 was also when his father died and the shares in the business were subsequently distributed to the children. In 1958, Dantata became the deputy managing director of the business with his brother Ahmadu, who was the MD. When Ahmadu died in 1960, Dantata became the head of the business.

Over the years, Dantata expanded the business holdings and his activities into various sectors of the Nigerian political and economic sphere. By the beginning of the 1960s, Dantata had a construction firm that received patronage from the newly independent government in Nigeria, his firm was given a contract to build part of the School of Aviation in Zaria. In 1961, he was among three other businessmen as part of the 23-member economic mission group, the first worldwide mission sent by an independent government in Nigeria. In 1964, he was among the pioneer board members of the Nigerian Industrial Development Bank. In 1968, Dantata was appointed Kano State commissioner for Economic Development, Trade and Industry under the administration of Audu Bako, he was in the position until 1973.

During the indigenization period of the 1970s, the Dantata group bought shares and held significant holdings in Mentholatum, SCOA, Funtua Cotton Seed Crushing Co and Raleigh Industries.

Dantata died on 28 June 2025, at the age of 94.

== Alhassan Dantata and Sons Group ==
Dantata assumed executive leadership of Alhassan Dantata and Sons in 1960. Established by his father as commodity firm trading in groundnut, kolanut and a few other commodities, Dantata later invested in some foreign enterprises operating in Nigeria. Between 1960 and 1980, it operated the following divisions: Building and construction division whose contracts included Defence Academy in Kaduna, extension to Ahmadu Bello University in Zaria and a civil aviation training school in Zaria. A Merchandise division that was founded in the middle of the 1970s traded in building materials primarily in Northern Nigeria. Northern Amalgamated and Marketing Company Limited, this unit has two main parts, a fertilizer division generally supplying governments and a technical division trading in WARD generators and Barford construction equipment. The firm maintained a division that held a Mercedes Benz dealership and another that maintained a terminal at Warri Port. By the 1990s, the group had changed its identity to become Dantata Organization with additional investment in oil exploration through Express Petroleum.

== Philanthropy ==
Dantata donated funds and buildings to various institutions around Kano. He donated the Alhassan Dantata Haemodyalysis Center to Aminu Kano Teaching Hospital. He was the first chancellor of Al-Qalam University, Katsina.

== See also ==
- List of Hausa people
