= Northern Nigeria Marketing Board =

The Northern Nigeria Marketing Board was a statutory commodity board authorized to fix producer prices of export commodities within the Northern region of Nigeria. It was also responsible for licensing buying agents and the purchasing export commodities in the region.

The board was previously named the Northern Region Marketing Board, a regional board that had earlier superseded the national and commodity specific Nigerian Groundnut Marketing Board after constitutional restructuring in 1954.

The major revenue earner for the board was groundnut and the Northern region was one of the world's major exporter of the produce post-World War II and up to the early 1970s. Purchases by the board increased from 178,000 tonnes in the 1949/1950 buying season to 787,000 tonnes in the 1963/1964 season. In the 1960s, excess funds of the board was contributed funds to the development of Ahmadu Bello University, Hamdala Hotel, Kaduna, Kaduna Textiles, and Bank of the North.

The board is now defunct.

== History ==
The board's history dates back to 1949 when the colonial government initiated a statutory monopoly institution for groundnut marketing. In 1954, self government became established within the regions and the groundnut board became the foundation for the Northern Region Marketing Board. About 32 million pounds from the groundnut board was transferred to the new regional organization.

In 1962, the organization began drawing funds through the means of a commercial bill issued drawn on the national produce and marketing company, exporters of the produce to Europe.

=== Functions ===
Some aims and functions of the board included price stabilization through the means of setting a fixed price for each buying seasons and to minimize fluctuations in prices. It also included promotion of agricultural research and development, purchase of export commodities, fixing prices for all grades of groundnuts, cotton, benniseeds, oil palm, soya beans and Cocoa within the Northern Region, appointment of license buying agents and marketing, shipping, and storage of export products.

== Pricing ==
A key part of the initial purpose of the marketing board was price stability, fixing producer prices whereby excess surplus is saved during rainy times to be used to subsidize farmers during lean times. However, in 1962, this policy was changed and surplus was mandated to be used for developmental purposes. Between the years 1947 to 1961, the surplus earning of the firm was approximately, 32 million pounds. In the 1960s and early 1970s, the producer price was competitively lower than its competition in Niger Republic, this induced smuggling or producers shifting to plant other crops, in addition, a drought in the Sahel region affected production lowering the volume of purchase by the board.
