= Halima Dangote =

Nigerian businesswoman

Halima Dangote mgana
- Born: Halima Aliko-Dangote; Kano State, Nigeria
- Education: American Intercontinental University (BA); Webster Graduate School (MBA)
- Occupation: Businesswoman
- Board member of: Dangote Group; Dangote Foundation
- Spouse: Sulaiman Sani Bello (m. 2008)
- Children: 2
- Father: Aliko Dangote
- Relatives: Dantata family

Halima Aliko Dangote is a Nigerian businesswoman. She is the executive director, commercial operations of Dangote Group, an African industrial conglomerate. She is the second daughter of Nigerian billionaire Aliko Dangote. She is on the board of Dangote Group, NASCON Allied Industries Plc, Aliko Dangote Foundation, Endeavor Nigeria, and a member of Women Corporate Directors and president of the board of the Africa Centre in New York.

== Education ==
Dangote attended the American Intercontinental University, London, England, where she obtained her bachelor's degree in marketing. She also obtained an MBA from Webster Graduate School in England.

Dangote attended leadership development programs such as the Program for Leadership Development (PLD) at Harvard Business School. At the Kellogg School of Management, she attended the Executive Development Program and also Finance and Accounting for Non-Financial Executives at Columbia Business School.

== Career ==
Dangote worked as a business analyst with KPMG Professional Services before joining Dangote industrial limited in 2008. In 2019, she was announced as the new group executive director, commercial operations of Dangote Industries Limited also known as Dangote Group. However, she has held several executive positions and has acquired 12 years of professional experience in business.

While she was the executive director of Dangote Flour Mills, she turned the company's revenue from a loss to profit using several initiatives. Under her administration, a World ‘Puff Puff’ Day was introduced by the Dangote Flours Mills, to be celebrated annually on October 27. During the celebration, Dangote Flours Mills made the Guinness World Records for the world's largest puff-puff pyramid.

She has also been an executive director for NASCON Allied Industries PLC, a member of the Dangote Group of companies that manufactures salt, food seasonings and food consumption-related products. Although, she is now a member of the board of directors, a non-executive member. She is a trustee of the Aliko Dangote Foundation.

Dangote is known for having a strong passion for women's empowerment. She is a member of the Women Corporate Directors (WCD). She is also a board member at Endeavor Nigeria and the president of the board of the Africa Centre in New York.

== Personal life ==
Halima Dangote is the second daughter of the Nigerian billionaire, Aliko Dangote who is the grandson of Sanusi Dantata and the great-grandson of Alhassan Dantata.

Halima met her spouse, Sulaiman Sani Bello while schooling in the university in the UK. They married in August 2008 in Kano State, Nigeria. After getting married, she didn't change or add her husband's name to her name. According to Islamic tradition, after marriage a woman bears her father's name. This is why Halima still bears her father's name 'Dangote' instead of her husband's name 'Bello'. They have 2 daughters.
