= Mahmud Dantata =

Nigerian businessman and politician (1922–1983)

Member of Parliament
- In office 30 December 1964 – January 1966
- Preceded by: Aminu Kano
- Succeeded by: position abolished
- Constituency: Kano East

Personal details
- Born: 1922 Sarari, Kano
- Died: 1983 (aged 60–61)
- Party: Northern People's Congress (NPC)
- Other political affiliations: Northern Elements Progressive Union (NEPU)
- Relations: Dantata family
- Occupation: Businessman, politician

Mahmud Dantata (1922–1983), often known as Mamuda Dantata, was a Nigerian businessman and politician who represented Kano East under the platform of NPC in the Nigerian House of Representatives from 1965 to 1966. Dantata was originally sympathetic to the cause of the opposition party NEPU, led by Aminu Kano but after an incarceration, he aligned with the dominant party to defeat Aminu Kano for a seat in the House of Representatives in 1964.

== Life ==
Dantata was born in the Sarari quarters of Kano in 1922. He was one of the most famous sons of Alhassan Dantata, popularly known as Mamuda Wapa, a wealthy merchant, Dantata completed his formal education in Ghana. Thereafter, he joined his father's business in 1945. In 1948, he branched out on his own, setting up investments in tourism, hotel, currency trading, sugar mill and petrol stations. His hotel was built in Wapa of Fagge quarters of Kano. By 1950, he started exploring ways to transport pilgrims by road through Sudan to Saudi Arabia. He founded a pilgrimage Company which was known as West African Pilgrimage Agency (WAPA), and acquired buses for the transportation of pilgrims. A year later, he started a chartered flight service to transport pilgrims by air from Kano. In the Fagge quarters of Kano, he reclaimed a swampy land to build WAPA house, the area later became known for currency trading. Dantata himself soon dedicated a section of his business to currency trading.

On 22 November 1957, Dantata was charged with illegal printing of currency notes and was represented by H. O. Davies, S. O. Lambo and C. A. J. Nwajei. Around 4000 people gathered outside the courthouse during the trial. He was ultimately found guilty and sentenced to eight years in prison. Before this imprisonment, Dantata was married to Ummulkulthum, a daughter of Sheikh Ibrahim Niass, but due to his arrest, the Sheikh dissolved the marriage.

After his release in July 1964, he switched political allegiance from the Northern Elements Progressive Union (NEPU) to the Northern People's Congress (NPC). Formerly the only supporter of NEPU within the Dantata family, he became the NPC candidate for the Kano East District. He ran against Aminu Kano, leader of NEPU and the incumbent MP for the district and was able to win the election, succeeding Aminu as the MP for Kano East. He held this position until the 1966 coup, which brought the end of the First Republic. WAPA house diversified into lodging and cinema and the businesses were managed by Sabo Bakin Zuwo who later became Kano state's Governor in 1983.
