= Dangote Cement =

Nigerian multinational cement manufacturer

Dangote Cement Plc
- Type: Public
- Traded as: NGX: DANGCEM
- Industry: Building materials
- Predecessor: Obajana Cement Plc
- Founded: 1992
- Founder: Aliko Dangote
- Headquarters: Lagos, Lagos State, Nigeria.
- Key people: Aliko Dangote (Chairman)
- Products: Cement
- Revenue: ▲NGN₦3,581.3 billion (2024)
- Operating income: ▲ ₦1,152 billion (2024)
- Net income: ▲ ₦503.247 billion (2024)
- Total assets: ▲ ₦6,403.3 billion (2024)
- Total equity: ▲ ₦5,450 billion (2022)
- Number of employees: ▲11,983 (2022)
- Parent: Dangote Group
- Subsidiaries: Sephaku Cement
- Website: dangotecement.com

Dangote Cement Plc is a Nigerian publicly traded multinational cement manufacturer headquartered in Lagos. The company is engaged in the manufacture, preparation, import, packaging, and distribution of cement and related products in Nigeria, and has plants or import terminals in nine other African countries.

== Acquisition of Obajana cement factory ==
The management of Dangote Industries Ltd. (DIL) claims that it fully owns the Obajana Cement Plant and that all legal procedures were followed in its 2002 acquisition. The company made this claim in a statement headed "Obajana Cement Plant: Separating Facts from Fiction" and released by Anthony Chiejina, Group Head Branding and Communications, DIL. Because it questioned Dangote Cement's ownership of the firm, the Kogi State government closed the Obajana plant. Tax payment difficulties were also brought up by the administration. The Obajana Cement Plant, one of the major taxpayers and the vehicle for one of the largest corporations with investments from hundreds of Nigerian and foreign investors, is regarded by the group as one of the most important elements of economic activity in the country. The firms claimed: "Dangote Industries Limited (DIL), pursuant to the legally binding agreement it entered into with KSG to invest in Kogi State, bought the property on which the Obajana Cement Plant is built alone in 2003, well after it had acquired the shares in the Obajana Cement business in 2002. "After paying the required costs and compensating the landowners, DIL received three Certificates of Occupancy in its name. "Again, well after it had purchased the shares of the Obajana Cement Company, DIL was fully responsible for the conception, design, acquisition, construction, and payment of the plant and machinery.

== History ==
It was formerly known as Obajana Cement Plc, and changed its name to Dangote Cement Plc in July 2010. Obajana Cement Plc was incorporated in 1992. Dangote Cement Plc is a subsidiary of Dangote Group and is the largest company traded on the Nigerian Stock Exchange.

Dangote Cement listed on the Nigerian Stock Exchange in October 2010, and as at August 2014 accounts for 20% of the total market capitalization of the Exchange. In 2014, the Investment Corporation of Dubai (ICD) purchased a $300 million stake in Dangote Cement.

Aliko Dangote has invested US$6.5 billion into the company between 2007, and 2012. Cement accounted for roughly 80 percent of Dangote Group's business as of 2011.

== Operations ==
The Dangote Cement plant in Obajana, Kogi, is the largest in Sub-Saharan Africa with 10.25 million tonnes per year capacity across three lines and a further 3 million tonnes per year capacity currently being built.

In 2012, the firm opened a $1 billion cement plant in Ibese, Ogun. The facility is capable of producing 6 million metric tonnes of cement per year, raising the company's total production by 40 percent at the time. The plant was installed by the Chinese construction and engineering firm Sinoma, and represents one of the largest non-oil investments in Nigeria.

The company's plant in Gboko, Benue has 3 million tonnes per year capacity with an upgrade to 4 million tonnes per year planned in 2013. A plant in Senegal along with a plant in Tanzania opened in 2015. That same year, another plant was opened in Ethiopia, which came under threat of civil unrest in 2017, and civil war in 2021.
