= Bebeji =

Nigeria local government

- LGA and town
- Interactive map of Bebeji
- Location in Nigeria
- Coordinates: 11°40′N 8°16′E
- Country: Nigeria
- State: Kano State

Government
  - Type: Multi party Democracy
  - Chairman: Hon Ibrahim Garba Bebeji

Area
  - Total: 717 km^{2} (277 sq mi)

Population (2006 census)
  - Total: 188,859
  - Density: 263/km^{2} (682/sq mi)
  - Religions: Islam and Christianity
- Time zone: UTC+1 (WAT)
- 3-digit postal code prefix: 711
- ISO 3166 code: NG.KN.BE

Bebeji is a town and Local Government Area in Kano State, Nigeria.

It has an area of 717 km^{2} and a population of 188,859 at the 2006 census.

The postal code of the area is 711.

== History ==
Bebeji local government area is situated in Kano state which is found in the Northwest geopolitical zone of Nigeria. The headquarters of Bebeji Local Government Area are in the town of Bebeji and consist of several towns and villages including Kofa, Gargai, Baguda, Duramawa, Kuki, Yakun, Yanshere, and Damau. The population of Bebeji Local Government Area is estimated at 179,254 inhabitants with the vast majority being members of the Hausa and Fulani. The dominant religious affiliation in Bebeji Local Government Area is Islam while the fufulde and Hausa languages are widely spoken in the area. Popular landmarks in Bebeji include the ancient Habe Mosque and the Film village in Kofa.

== Geography ==
The town of Bebeji is located 45 km southwest of Kano. It is in close proximity to Bagauda dam which supplies most of the potable water of Bebeji, the federal government recently approved a dam in Bebeji to supplement the Bagauda dam sometimes known for its structural failures. Bebeji is also the location of Habe mosque, declared a monument in 1964. The town is known to have a significant occurrence of ilmenite, a weakly magnetic mineral containing titanium oxide.

== Economy ==
Bebeji Local Government Area's economy is heavily reliant on agriculture, producing products such rice, millet, beans, and Irish potatoes. The Kantin kwari market is one of the several marketplaces in the area, and commerce is another important aspect of the economy of Bebeji. Hunting, ceramics, and blacksmithing are some of the other significant sources of revenue for the people living in Bebeji.

== Government ==
The current federal representative is Abdulmumin Jibrin. The chairman of the Bebeji Local Government Area is Kantoma Bebeji. Bebeji Local Government was created in 1990 during the administration of General Ibrahim Babangida.

== Climate ==
In Bebeji, the year-round heat and partly overcast dry season contrast with the unpleasant wet season. The average annual temperature is between 12 °C (54 °F) and 38 °C (100 °F), with occasional exceptions when it falls below 9 °C (48 °F) or rises over 41 °C (105 °F). The hot season, which runs from March 13 to May 14, lasts for 2.0 months and with daily highs that average more than 36 °C (97 °F). In Bebeji, April is the warmest month of the year, with typical highs of 37 °C (99 °F) and lows of 22 °C (72 °F). The average daily high temperature during the 1.9-month mild season, which runs from November 30 to January 27, is below 31 °C (88 °F). At an average low of 13 °C (55 °F) and high of 30 °C (86 °F), January is the coldest month of the year in Bebeji.

=== Cloud ===
The annual average of the portion of the sky that is cloudy in Bebeji varies significantly according on the season. In Bebeji, the clearer portion of the year starts from November 1 and lasts about 4.0 months, finishing about March 2. With 63% of the sky remaining clear, mostly clear, or partly cloudy on average, January is the clearest month of the year in Bebeji. The cloudier portion of the year starts about March 2 and lasts for 8.0 months, finishing about November 1. May is the cloudiest month of the year in Bebeji, with 74% of the sky being cloudy or overcast on average.

=== Precipitation ===
A day with liquid or liquid-equivalent precipitation of at least 1.0 millimetre (0.04 inches) is considered wet. Bebeji experiences wildly fluctuating odds of rainy days all year long. Over 40% of a given day will likely be rainy during the 4.6-month-long rainy season, which runs from May 14 to October 3. With 24.5 days on average having at least 1.0 millimetre (0.04 inches) of precipitation, August has the most rainy days in Bebeji. October 3 through May 14 makes up the 7.4-month dry season. On average, December has 0 days with at least 1.0 millimetre (0.04 inches) of precipitation, making it the month with the fewest wet days in Bebeji. We categorize rainy days as either rain only, snow only, or a combination of both. With an average of 24.5 days, August has the most number of days with just rain in Bebeji. That classification indicates that rain alone is the most frequent type of precipitation during the year, with an 80% chance on August 16.

=== Rainfall ===
There is at least 0.5 inches of rain in a sliding 31-day period throughout the 6.5-month rainy season, which runs from April 8 to October 25. August has an average of 200 millimetres (8 inches) of rain, making it the wettest month in Bebeji. The 5.4 months from October 25 to April 8 of the year are considered the rainless season. At 0 milimeters/inches on average, January is the month with the least amount of rain in Bebeji.

=== Flood ===
On September 8, 2022, the Tiga Dam overflowed, destroying surrounding homes, roads, and farms, forcing many to flee their homes.

== Religion ==
There main two religions practiced in Bebeji are Islam and Christianity.

== Notable people ==
- Alhassan Dantata – businessman and philanthropist
