= Nairametrics =

Nigerian financial media and data intelligence company

- Type: Business news and data intelligence
- Format: Digital
- Owner: Nairametrics Financial Advocates Limited
- Founder: Ugochukwu "Ugodre" Obi-Chukwu
- Editor: Chike Olisah
- Founded: 2013; 13 years ago
- Language: English
- Headquarters: 5 Iron Bar Street, Lekki Phase 1, Lagos, Nigeria
- Sister newspapers: Nairalytics
- Website: nairametrics.com

Nairametrics is a Nigerian financial media and data intelligence company that provides business news, market insights, investment tools, and financial literacy content. Founded in 2013 by Ugochukwu "Ugodre" Obi-Chukwu, it began as a blog focused on Nigerian stock market analysis before expanding into a multi-platform outlet, offering economic news, market analytics, podcasts, investor resources, and original research to both Nigerian and international audiences.

== History ==
Nairametrics was established in Lagos in 2013 as a product of Nairametrics Financial Advocates Limited. The company has evolved from a financial blog into a business news and intelligence outlet, reporting on macroeconomic trends, markets, public policy, and personal finance. Its audience includes investors, business professionals, and policy makers in Nigeria and abroad.

== Operations ==
The platform delivers daily business news, stock market insights, economic commentary, podcasts, newsletters, and investment analysis. It produces original data series, including macroeconomic statistics, consumer price data, and market analytics. Its research arm, Nairalytics, publishes data-driven reports and analyses focused on Nigeria's financial markets, including currency forecasts and market outlook.

== Nairametrics TV and Podcasts ==
In January 2025, Nairametrics launched Nairametrics TV, its dedicated YouTube channel, to further financial literacy and business coverage through video content. The channel features regular podcasts, including Drinks & Mics, which debuted in 2025 as an audience-driven business show featuring interviews, panel discussions, and market analysis.

== Recognitions ==
Nairametrics has received industry awards and recognitions:

- GAGE Awards
  - 2021 — Blog of the Year
  - 2022 — Nominated for Online News Platform of the Year
- EY Entrepreneur Awards — Winner, Emerging Category, West Africa, 2023
- Founder Ugochukwu Obi-Chukwu recognized as one of The Guardian (Nigeria)'s Top Visionary CEOs shaping Nigeria's economic landscape in 2024

== Capital Market Awards ==
In May 2025, Nairametrics hosted the inaugural Capital Market Choice Awards, recognizing excellence and innovation among market participants in Nigeria. The second edition of the awards was held on June 5 at The Civic Centre, Victoria Island, Lagos

== Nairametrics - The Money Fair (WISE 1.0) ==
On March 17th and 18th 2026, Nairametrics held the inaugural edition of The Money Fair (WISE 1.0) at the Landmark Events Centre, Victoria Island, Lagos.

== Partnerships ==
Nairametrics has a partnership with the Nigeria Investment Promotion Commission (NIPC) in 2025 to track and publish real-time investment inflows into the country.
