= Dangote Group =

Nigerian industrial conglomerate

Dangote
- Type: Private
- Industry: Conglomerate; Construction Materials
- Founded: May 1981; 45 years ago
- Founder: Aliko Dangote
- Headquarters: Lagos, Lagos State, Nigeria
- Key people: Aliko Dangote (President & CEO); Halima Dangote (Executive Director)
- Products: Cement; Sugar; Salt; Oil and gas
- Revenue: ▲US$4.1 billion (2017)
- Number of employees: 30,000
- Subsidiaries: Dangote Cement Dangote Refinery
- Website: www.dangote.com

The Dangote Group is a Nigerian multinational industrial conglomerate, founded by Aliko Dangote. It is the largest conglomerate in West Africa and one of the largest on the African continent. The group employs more than 30,000 people, and generated revenues of more than US$4.1 billion in 2017.

== History ==
The company was founded in May 1981 as a trading enterprise, importing sugar, cement, rice, fisheries, and other consumer goods for distribution in the Nigeria market.

The group now owns and operates over 18 subsidiaries, operating in ten African countries. Dangote Cement, is one of these subsidiaries and is listed on the Nigerian Stock Exchange, with its market capitalization accounting for almost 20 percent of the total capitalization of the Exchange. Dangote Group is headquartered in Lagos.

In 2016, Dangote signed a contract with CNOOC Group for the installation of a large underwater offshore pipeline. The pipeline, when completed, will extend from Bonny (Rivers State) through Ogedegbe, Olokola to Lekki and the Escravos Lagos pipeline, finally terminating at the West African Gas Pipeline.

== Overview ==
Dangote Group was created in the late 1970s, when Aliko Dangote established a venture that traded sugar and other consumer goods, which was funded by a $3,000 loan from his grandfather. Later, the group would gradually expand into trading other commodities, such as rice. In 1981, he established two business enterprises, Dangote Nigeria Limited, and Blue Star Services, this was a period when import licenses were required to import bulk commodities, the firm then sought to acquire import licenses for various commodities including steel, baby food, and aluminium products. He then added the shipping and the importing of cement to his group's portfolio. Dangote competed with Lafarge, a French company that imported and produced the bulk of African cement, which remains a major rival.

When the import license era was discontinued in 1986, the firm concentrated in bulk importing of salt, sugar, and rice and gradually reduced its cement business.

=== Manufacturing ===
The group's first foray into manufacturing began in 1989 with textiles Mills Limited, operating two operations, a textile weaving mill in Kano and the Nigerian Textile Mills limited's plant in Lagos. Beginning in 1997, following a decline of the textile sector, the company concentrated on manufacturing consumer goods it was importing into Nigeria such as sugar refining and flour milling, with the former it competed against imported products from Brazil and Europe. One of the biggest distributors of sugar in Nigeria, Dangote sugar refinery began local production in 1999. The strategy towards backward integration led to the establishment of a pasta plant and also flour milling to supply raw materials for making pasta. The company then invested in a cement manufacturing venture at Obajana, Kogi State, with an aggressive strategy, the Obajana plant began production with 5 million tonnes of cement. The group later invested funds in another cement operation at Ibeshe, Ogun State to shore up the local manufacturing sector from about 2.5 million tonnes to up to 8 million tonnes. To reduce economic and political risk within the country, the group began looking for opportunities to expand beyond Nigeria. The company's strategy then focused on continental expansion with the building and acquisition of cement plants in African countries.

Today, the Dangote Group is a diversified conglomerate, headquartered in Lagos, with interests across a range of sectors in Africa. Current interests include cement, sugar, flour, salt, seasoning, pasta, beverages and real estate, with new projects in development in oil and natural gas, telecommunications, fertilizer and steel. Competitors in both Nigeria and other portions of Africa include Stallion Group.

== Subsidiaries ==
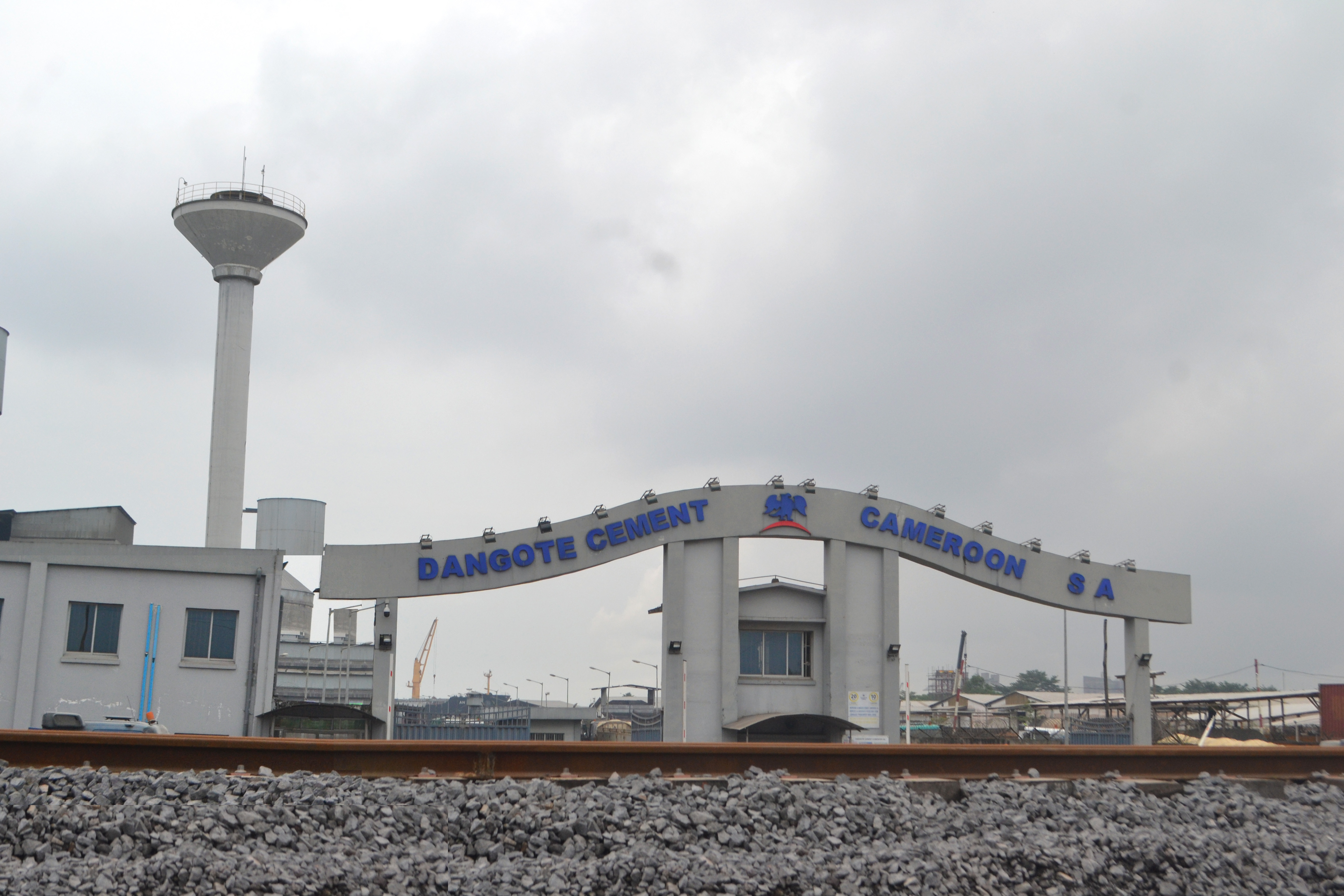
Entrance of Dangote Cement head office in Douala, Cameroon

Dangote Cement, the largest cement production company in Africa, with a market capitalization of almost US$14 billion on the Nigeria Stock Exchange, has subsidiaries in Benin, Cameroon, Ghana, Nigeria, South Africa and Zambia. In December 2010, the group signed an agreement with the Government of Zambia to construct a US$400 million cement plant in Zambia. It was completed in 2015 and is located in Ndola, The plant produces 42.5-grade cement, competing with the dominant 32.5-grade products in the market. The new plant is expected to have an annual output of 1.5 million metric tonnes of cement.

Dangote Sugar is another major subsidiary of the group, competing with Bua Sugar and Golden Sugar Co. Dangote Sugar is the largest sugar refining company in sub-Saharan Africa.

=== Petrochemicals ===
The group has also diversified into oil and gas-related ventures, establishing a 3 million tonnes fertilizer plant, petroleum refinery capable of refining 650,000 barrels of oil and a petrochemical operation. Dangote Refinery was inaugurated in May 2023, and will be the largest single train refinery in the world at full capacity.

== Nigerian businesses ==
Firm	Sector
Dangote Sugar	Consumer goods
Dangote Pasta	Consumer goods
National Salt Company (NASCON)	Consumer goods
Dangote Classic Seasoning	Consumer goods
Dangote Oil and Gas	Business support
Dansa Foods	Agro-allied
Dangote Transportation	Logistics
Dangote Agro-sacks	Business support
Greenview Development	Port management
Savannah Sugar	Agro-allied
MHF Properties	Property development

== See also ==
- Dangote Foundation
- Aliko Dangote
- Dangote Cement
- Halima Dangote
