= Sullubawa =

Fulani clan

Sisilɓe

Regions with significant populations
- Kano State, Jigawa State, Katsina State, Sokoto State (Nigeria)

Languages
- Hausa language, Fulfulde

Religion
- Islam

Related ethnic groups
- Fulani, Torodbe

The Sullubawa, Sisilɓe or Sullubanko'en are a Fulani clan that historically featured prominently in the Jihad of Usman dan Fodio which founded the Sokoto Caliphate. The ruling dynastic houses of Kano Emirate and Katsina Emirate; as well as the Ringim Emirate and Karaye Emirate belong to the clan and another amongst the four ruling Houses of Zazzau Emirate. They are also found in Kano, Jigawa, Katsina and Sokoto states.

== Origins ==
The Sisilɓe were originally Wangara or Wakoré, an eastern subgroup of itinerant Manding people, who spoke both Hausa and Fulfulde, after abandoning their own original Mande tongue. Such was the case also of the Laoɓe of Senegal and the trading group called the Jawamɓe (sing. Jawanɗo) in Sokoto.

According to other accounts, the ancestral origin of the Sullubawa is bilād as-sūdān (بلاد السودان) (Sullubawa in Hausa, Sullpe in Fulani language) are the descendants of Ahmed Bah باه (one of the four of Oquba Bin Nafah Alfehri الفهري عقبة بن نافع offspring and the two thousand soldiers (Faman settled in Silla) at Niger river have intermarriage with native residents they are distributed into 18 tribes some of them are: Yallabi يلبي Wlrapi ولربي Sall سال Sullupe Sullubawaسولوبي, Tarnapi تانرابي Oranbi, wallabi and 80 branches related to them.

Sullupi سل , سلب سلسلب of Fulani clan emigrated from Tur Sinai طور سيناء the coted name for Futa Toro فوتا تورو , which some Fulani tribe tale believe that were they migrated from to Hausa Land and then settled in Gerderga قيدقند between Jammalwal جماألوال and Ged (south Niger & North Nigeria) and their clan title were (Bah) به باه . Fulani Sullupi were existed in Macina ماسينا territory with their cattle cows long before the arrival of shake شيخ Ahmed Lobo.

They are the main branches of El-Faman ancestors of the Red Fulani of Western Sudan that white army who came from North Africa and settled in Silla since 739 A.D.

They are said to have originated from Futa Toro, in what is now Senegal, and are cousins with the Torodbe (Toronkawa) from Sissilo, the husband of Cippowo, a sister of Uthman Toroddo ancestor of Usman dan Fodio.

Sullubawa fought against the Hausa kingdoms in the jihad led by Usman dan Fodio. They became "hereditary beneficiaries of all positions of authority in all but one Hausa state". The clan controlled many of the fiefdoms of the Kano Emirate in the 19th century. They benefitted from British colonization and indirect rule which saw their influence increase. The Sullubawa later attained positions of power following independence; with one of them Umaru Musa Yar'Adua becoming President of Nigeria.

== Notable Sullubawas ==
- Ibrahim Dabo - Emir of Kano (1819–46)
- Sarkin Zazzau Abdulsalam - Emir of Zazzau (1853–1863)
- Muhammadu Dikko - Emir of Katsina (1906–44)
- Usman Nagogo - Emir of Katsina (1944–81)
- Muhammadu Sanusi I - Emir of Kano (1953–1963)
- Ado Bayero - Emir of Kano (1963–2014)
- Musa Yar'Adua - through his mother Minister of Lagos Affairs (First Republic) and Matawalle of Katsina
- Hassan Katsina - Chief of Army Staff (1966–67), and Governor of Northern Nigeria (1966–67)
- Muhammadu Dikko Yusufu - Inspector General of Police (1975–1979)
- Sayyadi Abubakar Mahmoud Usman- Emir of Ringim, Jigawa State
- Shehu Musa Yar'Adua - through his paternal grandmother Chief of Staff, Supreme Headquarters (1976–1979)
- Mohammed Bello - Chief Justice of Nigeria (1987–1995)
- Sanusi Ado Bayero - Chiroma of Kano (1990–2015), Managing Director of the Nigerian Ports Authority (2015) and Wamban of Kano (2020–present)
- Tijjani Hashim - Galadima of Kano (1993–2014)
- Umaru Musa Yar'Adua - through his paternal grandmother Governor of Katsina State (1999–2007), President of Nigeria (2007–2010), and Matawalle of Katsina.
- Abdullahi Dikko - Comptroller-General of Customs (2009–2015)
- Muhammadu Sanusi II - Governor of the Central Bank of Nigeria (2009–2014), and Emir of Kano
- Dan Galadiman Wazirin Zazzau - District Head of Gabasawa Kaduna North Local Government Area, Kaduna Metropolis, Kaduna State, Nigeria
- Hadiza Bala Usman - Managing Director of the Nigerian Ports Authority (2016–2021)
- Aminu Ado Bayero - Emir of Kano (2020–2024)
- Abba Kabir Yusuf - current governor of Kano state
- Tukur Abdulkadir Sulaiman - Among the top 2% most influential scientists in the world (2021, 2022, 2023, 2024).
- Aliyu Isa Aliyu - Among the top 2% most influential scientists in the world (2021, 2022).
- Ahmad lawal Saulawa- Computer Engineer

== See also ==
- Fula jihads
- Dambazawa
- Jobawa
