= Sanusi Ado Bayero =

Member of the Kano royal family (b. 1956)

- Chiroma of Kano; Wambai of Kano
- Born: 1 April 1956 (age 70); Kano, Northern Region, British Nigeria
Names
- Sanusi Lamido Ado Bayero
- House: Dabo
- Father: Ado Bayero
- Religion: Islam

Sanusi Lamido Ado Bayero (born 1 April 1956) is the eldest son of Ado Bayero and the brother of dethroned Emir Aminu Ado Bayero. He was the Chiroma (Crown Prince) of Kano from 1990 to 2015; and was titled Wambai (a prestigious title) of Kano by his brother.

== Early life ==
=== Family ===
Sanusi Lamido Ado Bayero was born on 1 April 1956, during the reign of his uncle Emir Muhammadu Sanusi I. His father, Ado Bayero, was the brother of the Emir, and later became Emir of Kano from 1963 to 2014. He is the eldest son and first child of his father; his mother was his fathers cousin. He was born at his father's house: Filin Chiranchi (Chiranchi Field), where his father stayed before becoming the Emir of Kano. Sanusi Ado later made the house his official residence in Kano.

Sanusi Ado is the eldest primogeniture of the royal family, and is revered by the emirate and people. His younger siblings include Former Emir of Kano: Aminu Ado Bayero and Nasiru Ado Bayero the Former Emir of Bichi. His nephew, Muhammadu Sanusi II (Sanusi Lamido Sanusi) succeeded his father as Emir of Kano from 2014 to 2020, when he was dethroned by the state government.

=== Education ===
Sanusi Ado received his primary education at the Rano Boarding Primary School from 1963 to 1969. He attended Rumfa College in Kano from 1969 to 1973, before later attending Government College, Birnin Kudu, one of the oldest prestigious government colleges in Northern Nigeria from 1973 to 1975, where he was the head boy. He attended the Nigerian College of Arts, Science and Technology in Zaria from 1975 to 1976.

In 1976, he proceeded to the Ecole International De La Langue Francoise in Paris, where he received a French diploma in 1979. He then proceeded to Ahmadu Bello University in Zaria, where he received a bachelor's degree in law in 1983, and was called to the Nigerian Bar in 1984. After his call to the bar, he served his mandatory youth service as a lecturer at the Kaduna Polytechnic from 1984 to 1985.

== Early career ==
Sanusi Ado served in the Kano State Ministry of Justice as a state counsel from 1985 to 1987; and in 1986 founded a private practice Lamido & Co. in Kano, before becoming legal adviser and company secretary of Kano State Investment and Properties between 1988 and 1989. He was the director general of the Kano State Council of Chiefs from 1991 to 1993, and was later transferred to be the head of Special Duties of the Kano State Government between 1993 and 1996. Between 1996 and 2000, he was the permanent secretary of the Ministry of Information, Youth and Culture. In April 2015, he was appointed the managing director of the Nigerian Port Authority, he position he held until his removal in August 2015.

== Crown prince ==
In 1990, Sanusi Lamido Ado Bayero was crowned the Chiroma of Kano (Crown Prince), member of the Kano Emirate Council and District Head of Gwale by Emir Ado Bayero.

=== Succession ===
In 2014, after fifty-one years on the throne his father, Ado Bayero died. A bitter succession struggle over who'd succeed him emerged within the royal family between the Bayero and Sanusi houses. As his eldest son and heir, Sanusi Ado was considered the natural successor and initial reports announced him as Emir. On 8 June 2014, his nephew Sanusi Lamido Sanusi was crowned Emir of Kano. Sanusi Ado in protest decided to leave Kano.

=== Exile and return ===
In 2015, he was stripped of all his titles, after refusing to pay allegiance to Emir Sanusi Lamido Sanusi. After five years of royal exile and obscurity and with the dethronement of Emir Muhammadu Sanusi II and the subsequent enthronement of his younger brother Aminu Ado Bayero as Emir, in July 2020, Sanusi Ado was reinstated his position in the Kano Emirate Council and made him Wamban Kano.

== Personal life ==
Sanusi Ado speaks fluent Arabic, Hausa, English and French. And he enjoys playing squash, reading, travelling, farming and horse-riding.

== Titles, styles and memberships ==
- July 2020 to present – Wambai of Kano (Title equal to the Emir)

=== Memberships ===
- In 1995, he became the Chairman of City Walls and Gates
- Member of the Inter-Faith Conference Fez, Morocco
- Member of the board of several companies, organizations and NGOs
- Member of the Doha Conference on Inter-Cultural and Civilization Dialogue
- Member of the Task Force of the Next Generation Nigeria initiative by the British Council.
