= Nasiru Ado Bayero =

Emir of Bichi

Nasir Ado Bayero
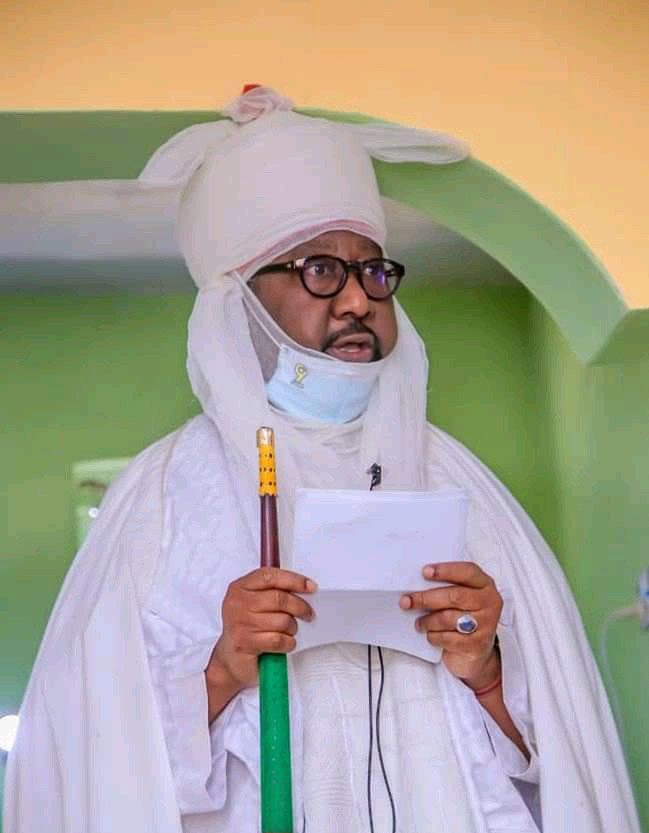

Emir of Bichi
- Reign: 9 March 2020 – 23 May 2024 (deposed)
- Coronation: 12 March 2020
- Predecessor: Aminu Ado Bayero
- Successor: Position abolished
- Born: 2 February 1964 (age 62); Kano, Northern Region, Nigeria
Names
- Nasiru Ado Bayero, OFR
Regnal name
- Nasiru Ado Bayero
- House: Dabo
- Father: Ado Bayero
- Religion: Islam

Nasir Ado Bayero (born 2 February 1964) is a Nigerian banker and businessman. He is the former Emir of Bichi, a Nigerian traditional state, Kano State, Nigeria. He ascended the throne from his brother Aminu Ado Bayero who was named as the Emir of Kano, following the deposition of his nephew Muhammad Sanusi II by Governor Abdullahi Umar Ganduje. Prior to his accession, Bayero was the Chiroma of Kano Emirate and district head of Nassarawa during the reign of Muhammad Sanusi II.

== Early life ==
=== Family ===
Bayero was born on 2 February 1964 in Kano, to late Ado Bayero who was the longest serving Emir of Kano in the history of Kano. He is the third son of late Ado Bayero and was the first child born at the official residence of Kano Emirate known as Gidan Dabo. His elder siblings include Sanusi Ado Bayero the former Chiroma from 1990 to 2015 which he later succeeded, and Aminu Ado Bayero the 15th Emir of Kano.

=== Education ===
Bayero had his primary and secondary school education in Kano, from where he proceeded to University of Maiduguri in Borno State to study Mass Communication in 1987, he is a graduate of Harvard Business School as well as having certificate in German language in 1993.

== Career ==
Bayero had experience working with Continental Merchant Bank Nigeria, he later moved to Coastal Corporation in Houston, Texas and then Hamlet Investment Ltd London. He is the chairman of Enclo Limited, 9 Mobile Nigeria.

== Titles and engagement ==
On 6 May 1994, Bayero was appointed as Tafidan Kano and district head of Waje by his late father the 13th Emir of Kano and later transferred as district head of Nassarawa local government, and then to Tarauni on the same status. He was promoted to Turakin Kano.In 2015, the 14th Emir of Kano Muhammad Sanusi II appointed him as Chiroma of Kano.

== Emir of Bichi ==
=== Accession ===
On 9 March 2020, Bayero ascended the throne following his brother Aminu Ado Bayero appointment as the 15th Emir of Kano.

Nasiru Ado Bayero House of Dabo Born: 1964
Regnal titles
Preceded by Aminu Ado Bayero	Emir of Bichi; 2020–present	Incumbent
