= Ibrahim Ado-Kurawa =

Nigerian historian, author and public administrator

- Born: 1963 (age 62–63); Kano, Nigeria
- Education: Bayero University Kano
- Occupations: Historian, author, public administrator
- Known for: Research on Kano Emirate history, Sharia implementation, political economy of Northern Nigeria
- Title: Special Adviser and Director of Research and Documentation to the Governor of Kano State (former)
- Family: Murtala Muhammed

Ibrahim Ado-Kurawa (born 1963) is a Nigerian historian, author, and public administrator based in Kano. He served as Special Adviser on Research and Documentation to former Kano State Governor Ibrahim Shekarau and has published books on Northern Nigerian history, traditional chieftaincy systems, and Sharia law.

== Early life and education ==
Ado-Kurawa was born in Kano, Nigeria, in 1963. He attended Bayero University Kano for his higher education. He is related to former Nigerian Head of State General Murtala Muhammed through a family lineage stemming from Chief Alkali Muhammad Zangi of Kano. In the late 1980s, Ado-Kurawa began researching Arabic manuscripts, local genealogical records, and northern historical documents.

== Public service and career ==
Under Governor Ibrahim Shekarau, Ado-Kurawa was appointed Special Adviser and Director of Research and Documentation for the Kano State Government.

He has also served as a research official and historian for the Kano Emirate Council, documenting administrative structures during the reigns of Emirs Ado Bayero and Muhammadu Sanusi II. Additionally, he served as an editor for the compendium project Nigeria Year Book and Who Is Who.

== Research and commentary ==
Ado-Kurawa has written on political developments, constitutional federalism, and legal history in Nigeria. In 2000, he published Shari'ah and the Press in Nigeria, which examined news coverage regarding the reintroduction of Sharia criminal codes. His 2002 book, The Politics of Resource Control and Restructuring in Nigeria, focused on constitutional federalism and revenue allocation debates.

=== Kano Emirate dispute ===
During the 2019 Kano Emirate controversy, Ado-Kurawa publicly opposed Governor Abdullahi Umar Ganduje's division of the traditional emirate into four new council areas. He argued that the split violated historical precedent established under the Sullubawan Dabo Dynasty following the Sokoto Jihad, as well as provisions of the Nigerian Constitution.

== Selected publications ==
- History and Genealogy of the Gyanawa (1000 AH to Date) (1988)
- Shari'ah and the Press in Nigeria: Islam versus Western Christian Civilization (2000)
- Domestication of the Shari'ah in Nigeria (2002)
- The Politics of Resource Control and Restructuring in Nigeria (2002)
- Mallam Ibrahim Shekarau and the Press: An Analytical Survey (2004)
- Nigerian Politics and National Political Reform Conference (2005)
- Sarkin Kano Muhammad Sanusi II: An Illustrated Biography (2019)
