= Aminu Sanusi =

Nigerian diplomat

Permanent Secretary of the Ministry of Foreign Affairs
- In office 1975–1979
- Minister: Joseph Garba; Henry Adefope
- Preceded by: Joe Iyalla

Nigeria's ambassador to People's Republic of China
- In office 30 March 1972 – 23 September 1975
- President: Yakubu Gowon; Murtala Muhammed
- Preceded by: position established
- Succeeded by: Jolly Tanko Yusuf

Nigerian High Commissioner to Canada
- In office 14 February 1967 – 1972
- President: Yakubu Gowon
- Preceded by: position established
- Succeeded by: Peter A Afolabi

Personal details
- Resting place: Nassarawa Palace, Kano State, Nigeria
- Children: Sanusi Lamido Sanusi
- Parent: Muhammadu Sanusi I (father)
- Occupation: diplomat

Muhammed Aminu Sanusi CON was a Nigerian diplomat. He was the son of Muhammadu Sanusi I, the 11th Emir of Kano, and the father of Sanusi Lamido Sanusi, the 14th Emir of Kano. A pioneer of Nigerian diplomacy, he served in various roles within the Ministry of Foreign Affairs, including ambassadorial positions and Permanent Secretary. He held the traditional title of Ciroma of Kano.

Sanusi was the Third son of Muhammadu Sanusi and his wife Uwar Soro Wayo. He joined the colonial public service and was among the first twelve pioneering Nigerian foreign officers who established the foundation of the Nigerian Foreign Service. He served as ambassador to Belgium and as Nigerian high commissioner to Canada from 1967 to the early 1970s. In 1972, he was appointed Nigeria's first ambassador to the People's Republic of China. He later served as Permanent Secretary of the Federal Ministry of Foreign Affairs from 1975 to 1979.

Following the deposition of his father in 1963, Sanusi was considered a potential successor to the emirship. However, he was not favoured for the position, reportedly preferring to continue his career in the Foreign Affairs Ministry. Upon his father's ascension as Emir in 1953, the title of Ciroma of Kano became vacant, and Sanusi was subsequently given the title, allowing him to serve on the Kano Emirate Council until his death.
