= Bichi Emirate =

Emirate in Northern Nigeria

Bichi Emirate Bichi Emirate
- 2019–2024
- Status: Traditional Hausa Emirate
- Capital: Bichi
- Government: Monarchy
- Emir
  - 2019–2020: Aminu Ado Bayero
  - 2020–2024: Nasiru Ado Bayero
- Historical era: Modern Nigeria
  - Created by Kano State Government: 2019 2019
  - Abolished and merged back into Kano Emirate: 23 May 2024 2024
- Today part of: Nigeria

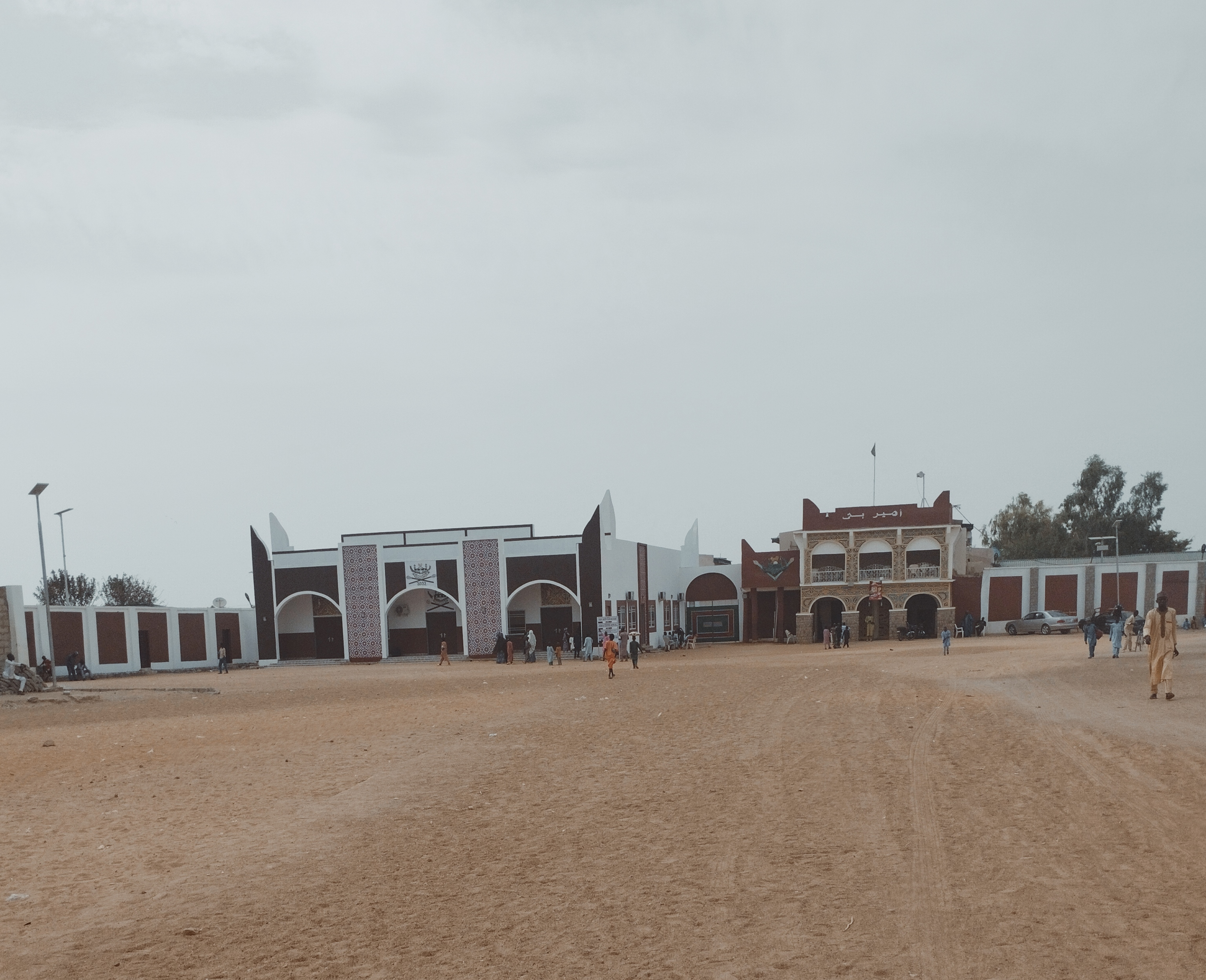
Emir's Palace Bichi

Bichi Emirate is a Hausa traditional emirate in Kano State in Northern Nigeria. Its palace is located in the town of Bichi, Bichi Local Government Area. The Bichi Emirate was established in 2019, when the Kano State Government created four emirates from the oldest kingdom of Kano. The Bichi emirate consists of 9 Local Government Areas of Kano State. These local governments are Bichi, Bagwai, Shanono, Tsanyawa, Kunchi, Makoda, Dambatta, Dawakin Tofa, and Tofa local governments.

The current emir of Bichi is Nasiru Ado Bayero. Aminu Ado Bayero is the first emir of Bichi emirate since its established in 2019. In 12 March 2020, the Kano State Government replaced him with his brother Nasiru Ado Bayero as the Emir of Bichi following the dethronement of former Emir of Kano Muhammadu Sanusi II from the reign of Emir of Kano with his replacement by Aminu Ado Bayero.

== Abolishment of the Bichi Emirate ==
On May 23, 2024, the Kano State Governor Abba Kabir Yusuf announced the abolishment of the Bichi Emirate along with four other emirates that were created in 2019 by the former governor, Abdullahi Umar Ganduje. This decision reverted Kano State back to having a single emirate as it was traditionally structured before the 2019 reorganization.

The abolishment resulted in the consolidation of all local government areas under the Bichi Emirate, including Bichi, Bagwai, Shanono, Tsanyawa, Kunchi, Makoda, Dambatta, Dawakin Tofa, and Tofa, into the Kano Emirate. This move aimed to restore the historical structure and administrative coherence of the Kano State traditional system.

Sanusi Lamido Sanusi II was enthroned as the Emir of Kano on the same day, reaffirming his leadership over the re-unified Kano Emirate. This marked a significant shift in the traditional hierarchy and governance of Kano State, aiming to streamline and strengthen the emirate's administrative functions under a single leadership.
