= Muhammad Inuwa =

Muhammadu Inuwa
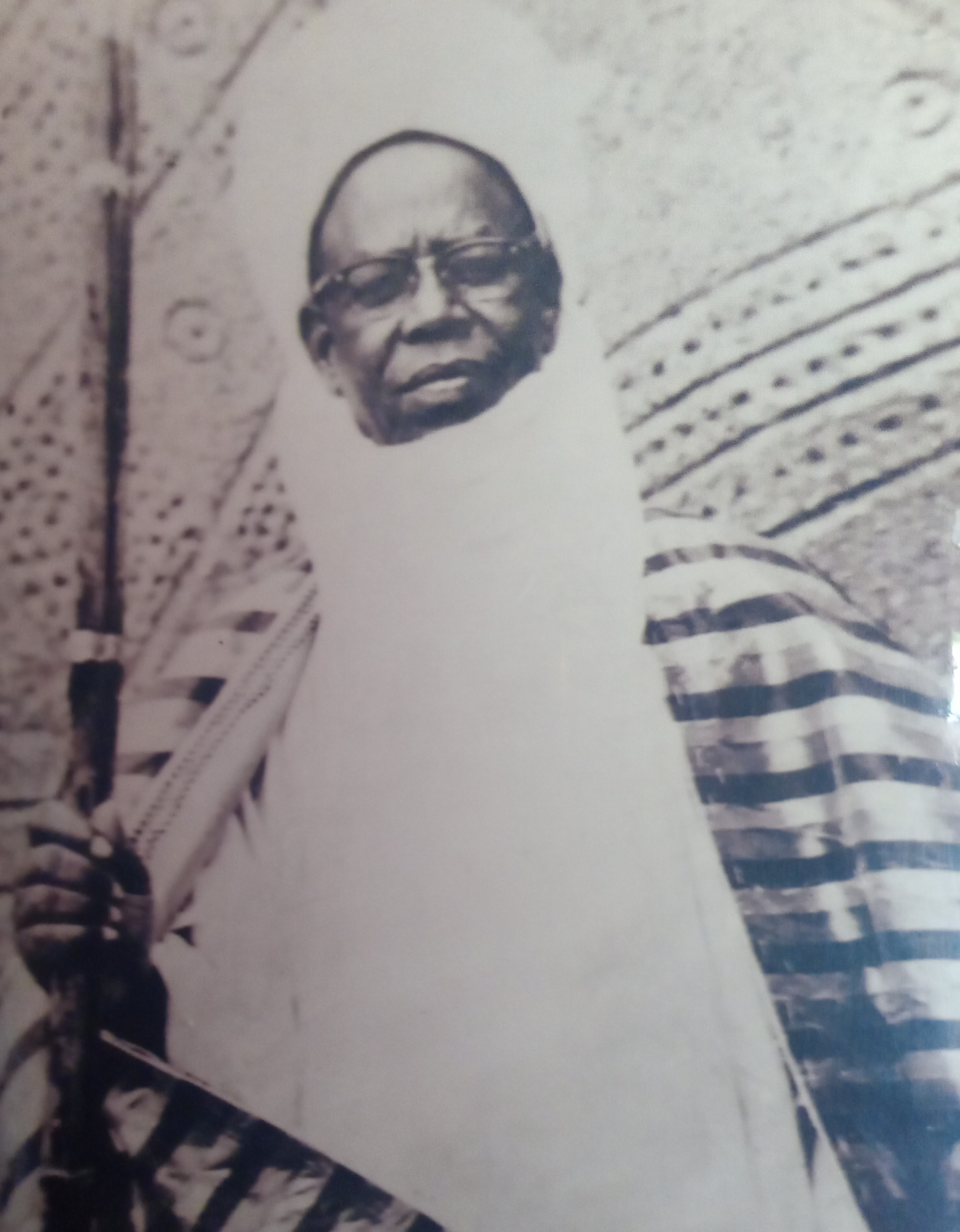
- Undated photograph

Emir of Kano
- Reign: April 1963 - October 1963
- Predecessor: Muhammadu Sanusi
- Successor: Ado Bayero

Galadima Kano
- Reign: 1939 -1963
- Predecessor: Abdulkadir dan Abbas
- Born: c. 1904
- Died: October 8, 1963; Kano
- Father: Muhammad Abbass

Muhammadu Inuwa was Emir of Kano, he replaced Emir Muhammadu Sanusi who abdicated in 1963. Emir Muhammadu Inuwa was replaced by Emir Ado Bayero, his nephew and son-in-law.

== Life ==
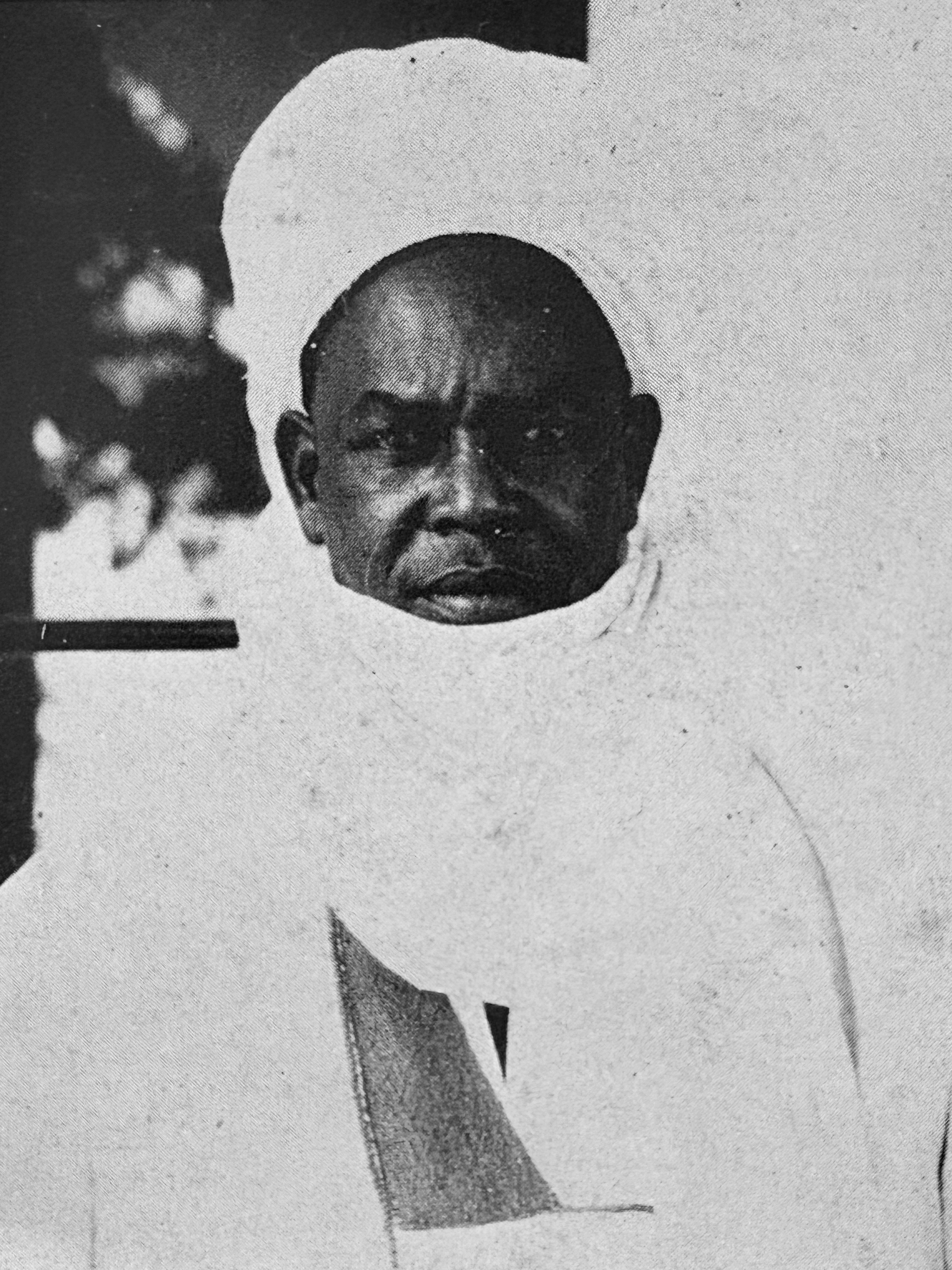
Galadima Inuwa in 1955

Inuwa was born in c. 1904 to the family of Muhammad Abbass, who was then the Emir of Kano. His father died when he was fifteen years old, and he was subsequently placed in the care of his brother Abdullahi Bayero. When Bayero assumed the position of emir in 1926, he appointed Inuwa as Turakin Kano and made him District Head of Ungogo. He became the District head of Minjibir in 1932. In 1939, he succeeded his brother Abdulkadir dan Abbas as Galadima Kano and was appointed the district head of Dawakin Kudu. Inuwa was influenced by Tijaniyya cleric Shaykh Yahya b. Muhamad Naffakh and was considered pious among his peers and patient. In 1944, he was a councilor in the Kano Native Authority and from 1952 to 1963, he was a member of the Northern Regional Assembly. He was already aged when he became the Emir of Kano in 1963, Muhammadu Inuwa succeeded his nephew Sanusi in April 1963, both were contenders for the position of emir in 1953. He ruled for only three months before he died.
