= Government College, Birnin Kudu =

Location
- Birnin Kudu, Jigawa State; Nigeria; 11.446°N 9.489°E

Information
- Type: Secondary school
- Established: 1947
- Founders: Northern Regional Government
- Gender: Boys
- Age: 11 to 18
- Former pupils: Birnin Kudu Old Boys Association

Government College, Birnin Kudu is a secondary school in Birnin Kudu, Jigawa State. Founded as a middle school in 1947 by the regional government, the college has some notable alumni, including five governors and industrialist Aliko Dangote.

== Notable alumni ==
- Abubakar Rimi - Governor of Kano
- Sule Lamido - Governor of Jigawa
- Abdullahi Umar Ganduje - Governor of Kano
- Aliko Dangote - Chairman of Dangote Group
- Aminu Ado Bayero - 15th Emir of Kano
- Senator (Arc.) Kabiru Ibrahim Gaya-Former Governor of Kano
- Senator Bello Maitama Yusuf -Former Minister of trade and investment in the second republic, FRN.
- Barrister Ali Sa'ad Birnin Kudu- Former Governor of Jigawa
- Alhaji Lamido Sanusi Ado Bayero-Former Managing Director, Nigerian Ports Authority.
- Brigadier General Lawal Jafar Isah-Former Military Administrator of Kaduna
- Dr. Junaidu Mohammed- a member of House of Representatives in the Second Republic and the vice presidential candidate of the Social Democratic Party in Nigeria’s 2019 presidential elections.
- Alhaji Halilu Ahmed Getso-Veteran Journalist
- Alhaji Kassim M. Bichi
- Dr. Tafida Abubakar Ila-Emir of Rano
