= Kano Emirate Council =

Emirate of Kano
- Northern Nigerian Emirate
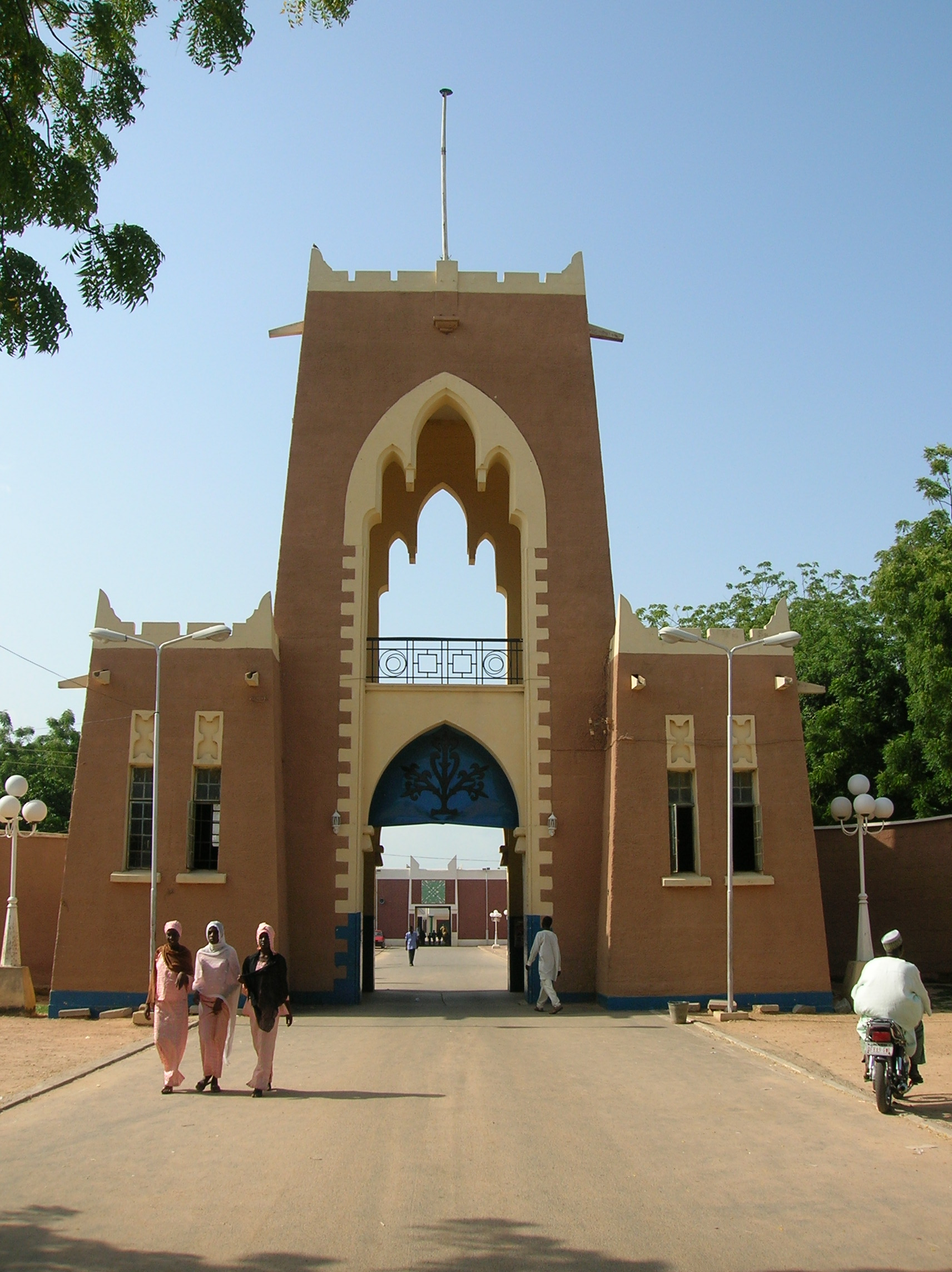
- Gate to the Gidan Rumfa, the Emir's palace

- Flag

- Location within Nigeria
- Coordinates: 12°00′N 8°31′E
- Country: Northern Nigeria
- Emirate: Kano Emirate
- Legislature: Shura/Taran Kano
- Established: 3 February 1903
- Founder: British Empire
- Emirate: Emirate

Government
  - Emir: Muhammadu Sanusi II (disputed)
  - Makama: Abdullahi Sarki Ibrahim
  - Sarkin Bai: Mukhtari Adnan †
  - Sarkin Dawaki: Bello Abubakar
  - Madaki: Yusuf Nabahani
  - Grand Vizier: Interregnum
- Languages: Hausa (official), English (unofficial), Fula

The Kano Emirate Council is a traditional state in Northern Nigeria with headquarters in the city of Kano, the capital of the modern Kano State. Preceded by the Emirate of Kano, the council was formed in 1903 after the British pacification of the Sokoto Caliphate. The borders of the Emirate are contiguous with Kano State.

Ado Bayero became the emir in 1963, reigning for 50 years until his death in 2014; he oversaw the transformation of the Emirate under Nigeria's federal constitution that subjects Northern Nigeria's Emirates to political leaders. The emir of Kano serves as the leader of the Tijaniyya sufi order in Nigeria, historically the second most important Muslim position in Nigeria after the Sultan of Sokoto who is the leader of the more populous Qadiriyya sufi order in Nigeria.

== History ==
In 1903, British forces captured Kano. The 7th emir of Kano, who was in Sokoto when Kano was occupied, was captured and exiled to Lokoja where he died in 1926. The British immediately made Kano an important administrative centre in Northern Nigeria.

The role of the Kano Emirate steadily grew in the new Northern Nigeria. In the 1940s administrative re-organisation restored the consultative status of the ancient Taran Kano or council of Nine, this receded the status of the Emir as the Sole Native Administrator and instead made him the head of a Native Authority.

Also in the 1940s Northern Nigerian agitation for independence from the South led to a national re-organisation that made Nigeria a Federation of Independent and autonomous regions. Kano became the fulcrum of a new Northern political class that emerged to fight against perceived southern influence.

In 1950 the Northern Elements Progressive Union emerged in Kano as the first political party in Northern Nigeria, it was swiftly followed by the emergence of the Northern People's Congress and other smaller political parties.

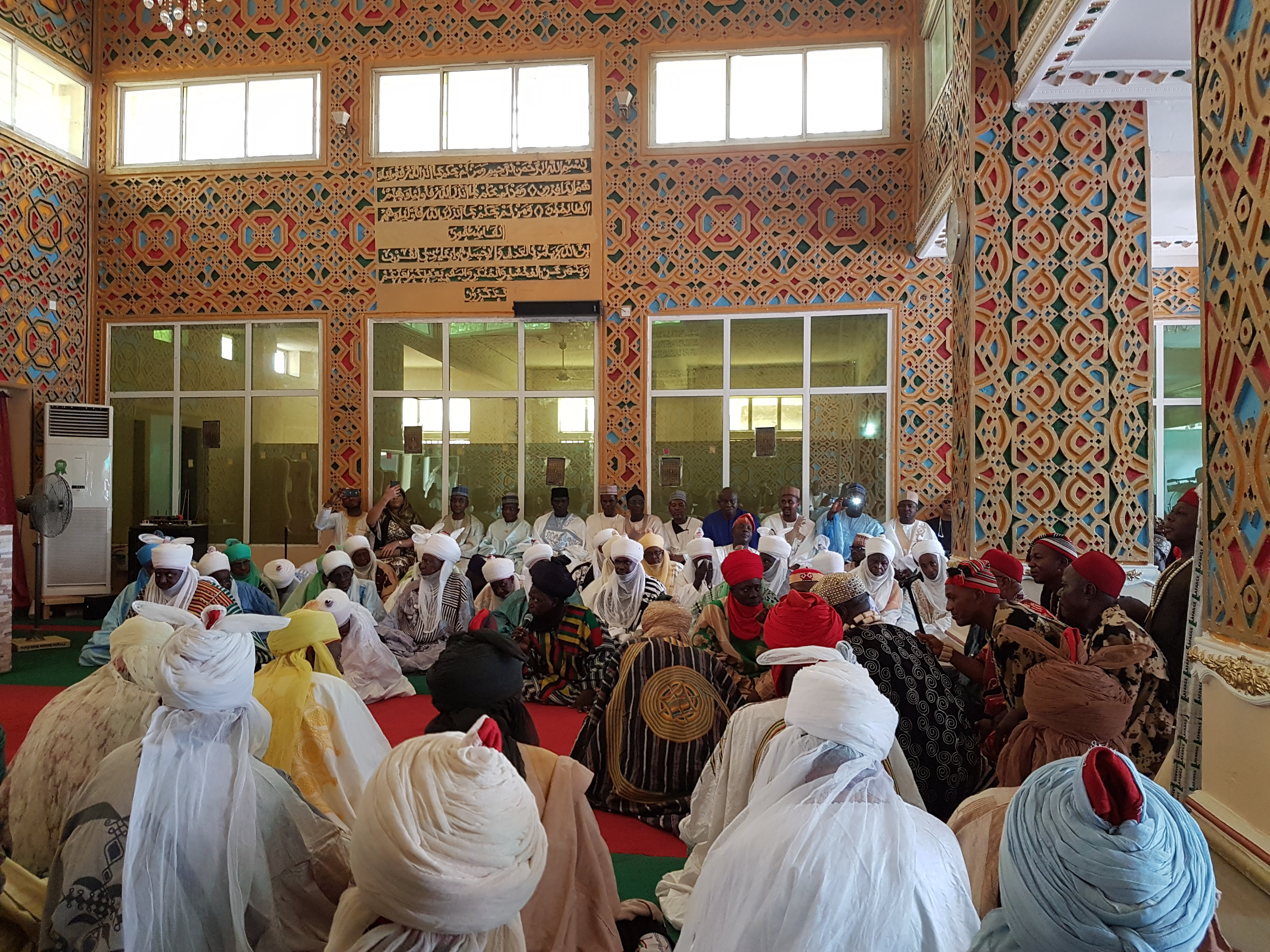
People paying their respects to the Emir of Kano

In 1963, allegations of fraud and misappropriation were laid against the Emir of Kano Sanusi Bayero. A panel headed by D M Muffet later found evidence of misappropriation and recommended the resignation of Sanusi. Immediately afterwards, Emir Sanusi abdicated and was replaced by his uncle Inuwa Abbas who reigned for only nine months before his death. The abdication of Sanusi led to agitation of Kanoan Independence and led to the emergence of the Kano People's Party. Inuwa was succeeded by his nephew Ado Bayero who reigned for 50 years before his death on 6 June 2014.

Various administrative re-organisations in Bayero's reign saw a gradual weaning of the Emir's powers. Although the Emir has limited formal powers, he continues to exert considerable authority and provides leadership on issues such as the tension between Christians and Muslims in Northern Nigeria. On 8 June 2014, former Nigerian central banker Muhammadu Sanusi II was selected to succeed Bayero as Emir of Kano.

Sanusi broke from traditional palace etiquette, which expected the emir to not be too outspoken and keep his speeches short and delivered only when required. Sanusi on the other hand is known to be outspoken, and has commented variously on local government politics.

=== Conflict with local government ===
In 2019, the emirate was split into five by the Kano state government, calving off Emirates of Bichi, Karaye, Gaya and Rano, in addition to the substantially reduced Kano Emirate. This decision was spearheaded by the local Kano state governor, Abdullahi Umar Ganduje, in an effort to minimise the influence of the Kano emir. Sanusi had been known to criticise the government and, more directly, the governor himself. He was also alleged to have clandestinely supported Gandujes opponent during the 2019 elections, Abba Kabir Yusuf. Sanusi failed to show up to official government state functions and official meetings, following his disputes with the governor. This conflict ultimately culminated with the forced ousting of Sanusi as emir in March 2020, following accusations that he had "total disrespect" for the local government. Sanusi was replaced as emir by Aminu Ado Bayero.

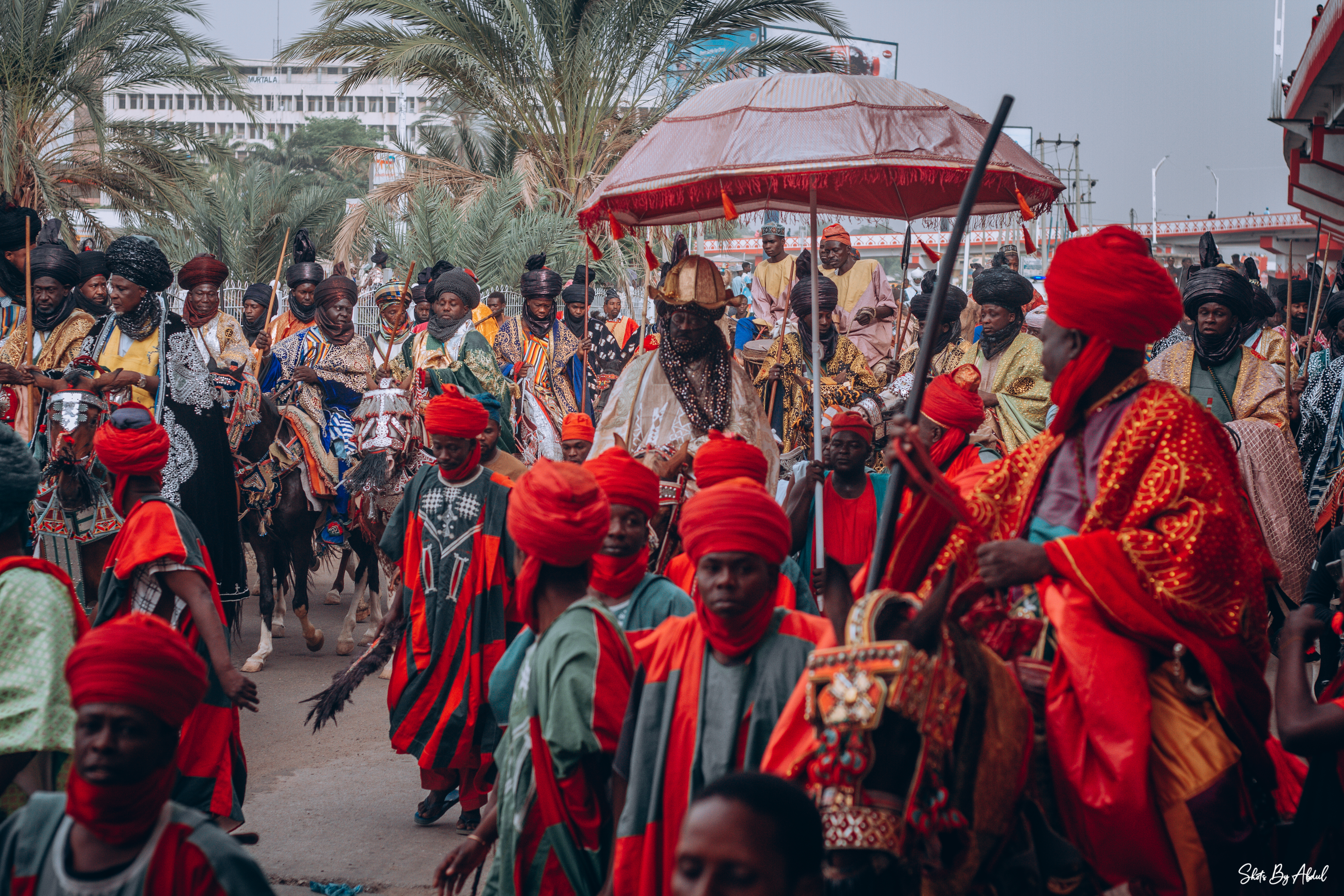
Emir of Kano in 2024

In May 2024, Muhammadu Sanusi II was reinstalled as Emir of Kano by the local government (now led by Abba Kabir Yusuf). The emirates of Bichi, Karaye, Gaya, and Rano were disbanded, and the original borders of the emirate (pre-2019) were re-established. His reinstatement proved controversial, with conflicting court orders simultaneously ordering the Kano government to remove Sanusi as emir (issued by the Federal High Court), while the Kano State High Court restrained local authorities (such as the police) from removing Sanusi as emir. In addition, Aminu Ado Bayero (who had replaced Sanusi as emir 4 years prior) refused to leave his palace in Nasarawa. On 20 June 2024, another court order, from the Federal High Court of Kano, was announced which nullified the Kano Emirate Council (Amendment No. 2) Law (which had reinstated Sanusi as Emir and destroyed the emirates Bichi, Karaye, Gaya, and Rano). In conflict with this view, the Kano State Government responded to the aforementioned court order, and stated that it had in-fact affirmed their decision to abolish the emirates and reinstate Sanusi as Emir of Kano.

In July 2024, the government of Kano State re-established the emirates of Karaye, Gaya, and Rano as second-class emirates under the authority of the first-class Emirate of Kano. This decision re-established the emirates created previously created in 2019, but retained the overall authority of Kano over them; their emirs would be answerable to the emir of Kano. Notably, Bichi Emirate was not re-established.

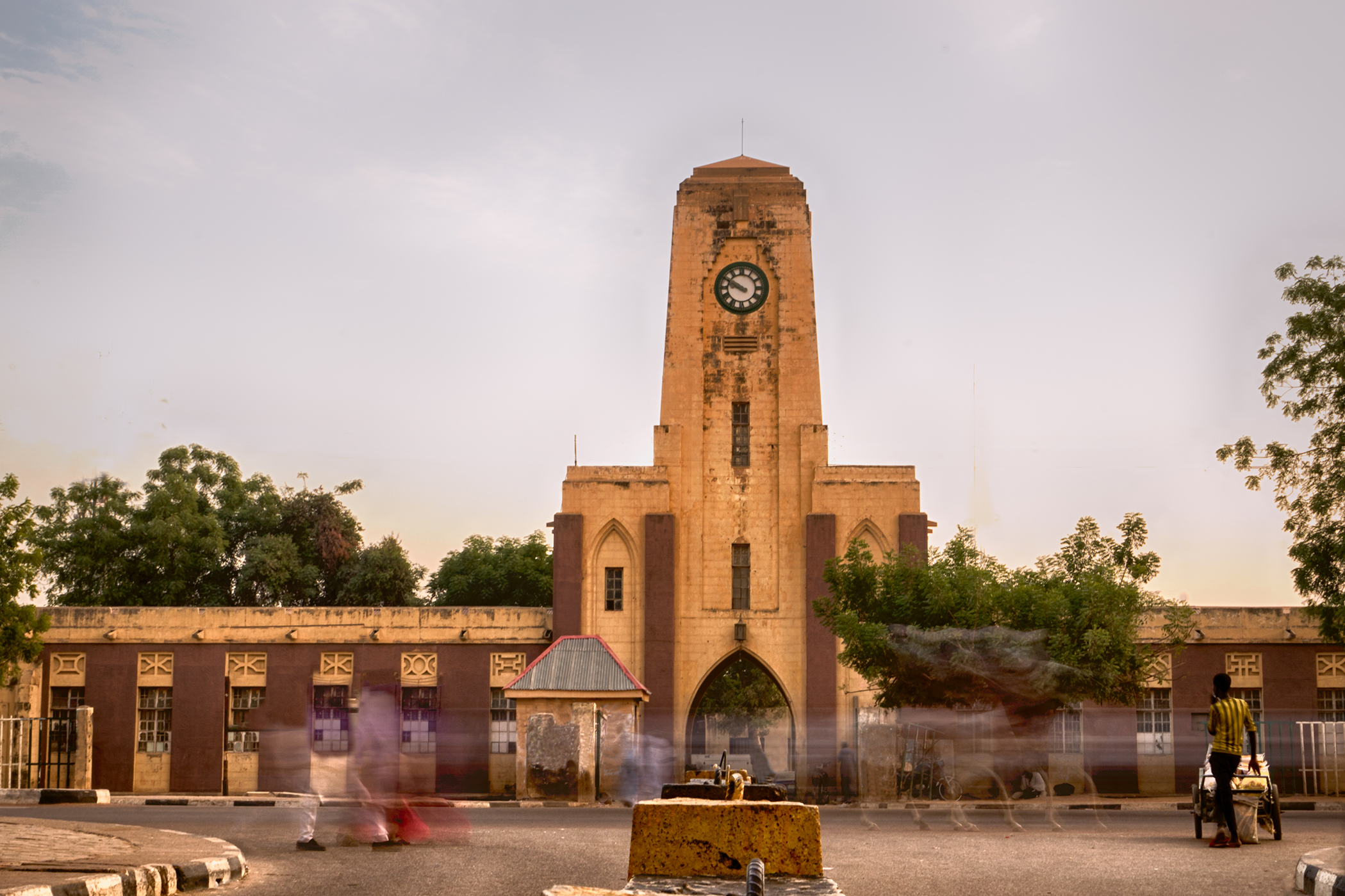
Kano Emirates Council

== Government ==
Under the British indirect administrative structure the Emir was the sole Native Authority subordinate to the supervision of the British Colonial Resident. Hakimai (Chiefs) assisted the Emir in the administration of the Emirate and under a re-organization by Dr. Cargill the Resident of Kano province the Hakimai were posted out of the capital to the Districts as District Heads.

The Cargill re-organization made each Hakimi to have a contiguous territory where he resided at the headquarters and administered on behalf of the Emir and the Jakadu were eliminated. The powerful slave officials were also not given any territories and their previous possessions were given to the free born Hakimai most of whom belonged to the Sullubawa ruling clan with one each from the Yolawa, Jobawa, Danbazawa, Sullubawan Tuta who became the Kingmakers that appoint the Emir.

== Commerce ==
The British encouraged the production of commodities for export as raw materials for British industries. In Kano groundnut and cotton were encouraged. Kano Province became the largest producer of groundnut in Nigeria and by the 1960s during good harvest it was producing about half million tons of the commodity. The export of cotton was not as high as groundnut because the local textile craftsmen used it until later when their products became less competitive compared to imported items. The railway was a great facilitator of colonial economic transformation. It reached Kano in 1912 and it helped the province to maintain its economic edge over other provinces. Apart from the ease of transportation it also brought many migrant laborers and semi-skilled people from other parts of Nigeria and they formed the nucleus of Sabon Gari a new district created for them outside the city of Kano.

== Emirs ==
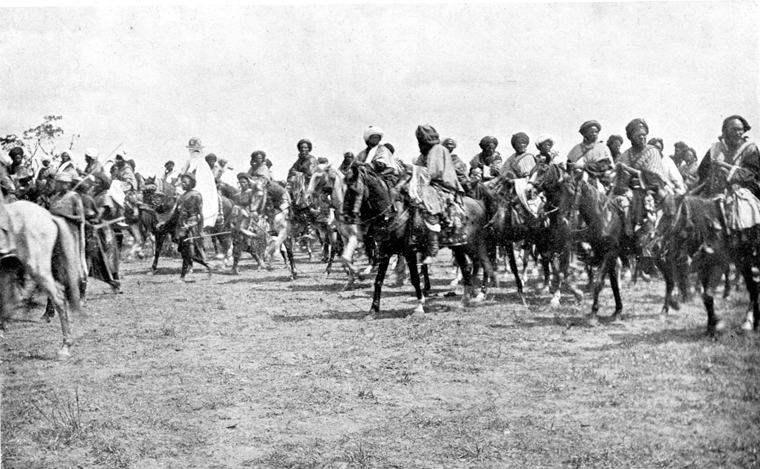
The Emir of Kano on the march (1911)

Emirs during and after the colonial period:

- Muhammad Abbass (ruled 1903–1919)
- Usman II (ruled 1919–1926)
- Abdullahi Bayero (ruled 1926–1953)
- Muhammadu Sanusi (ruled 1954–1963)
- Muhammad Inuwa (ruled 1963)
- Ado Bayero (ruled 1963– 6 June 2014)
- Muhammadu Sanusi II (8 June 2014 - 9 March 2020)
- Aminu Ado Bayero (9 March 2020 – 23 May 2024)
- Muhammadu Sanusi II (23 May 2024 – present)

== See also ==
- List of rulers of Kano
