= Muhammad Abbas (Emir of Kano) =

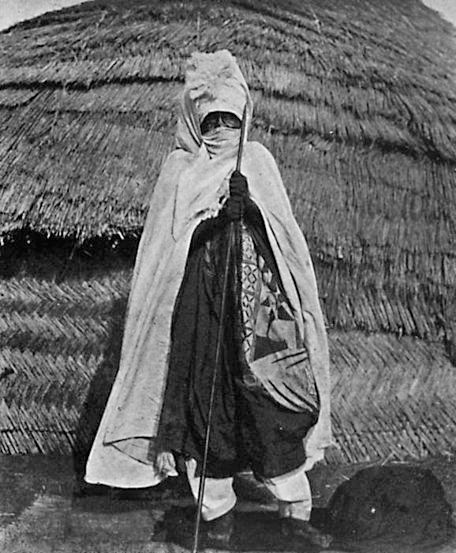
- Muhammad Abbas, c. 1907

Emir of Kano
- Reign: 1903–1919
- Coronation: May 1903
- Predecessor: Aliyu Babba
- Successor: Usman (Dantsoho)

Regent of Kano
- Reign: March 1903 – May 1903
- Born: ? Kano
- Died: 1919; Kano Palace, Northern Nigeria
- Issue: Abdullahi Bayero; Muhammad Inuwa; Hajiya Ma'daki
- House: House of Dabo
- Father: Abdullahi Maje Karofi

Muhammad Abbas son of Abdullahi Maje Karofi was a regent and later the first emir of Kano after the Battle of Kano. He was appointed regent by Lord Lugard after the pacification of Northern Nigeria, he presided over the transformation of the caliphal emirate into an emirate subject to the British throne under the Protectorate of Northern Nigeria. He was older than the previously dethroned emir, Aliyu Babba.

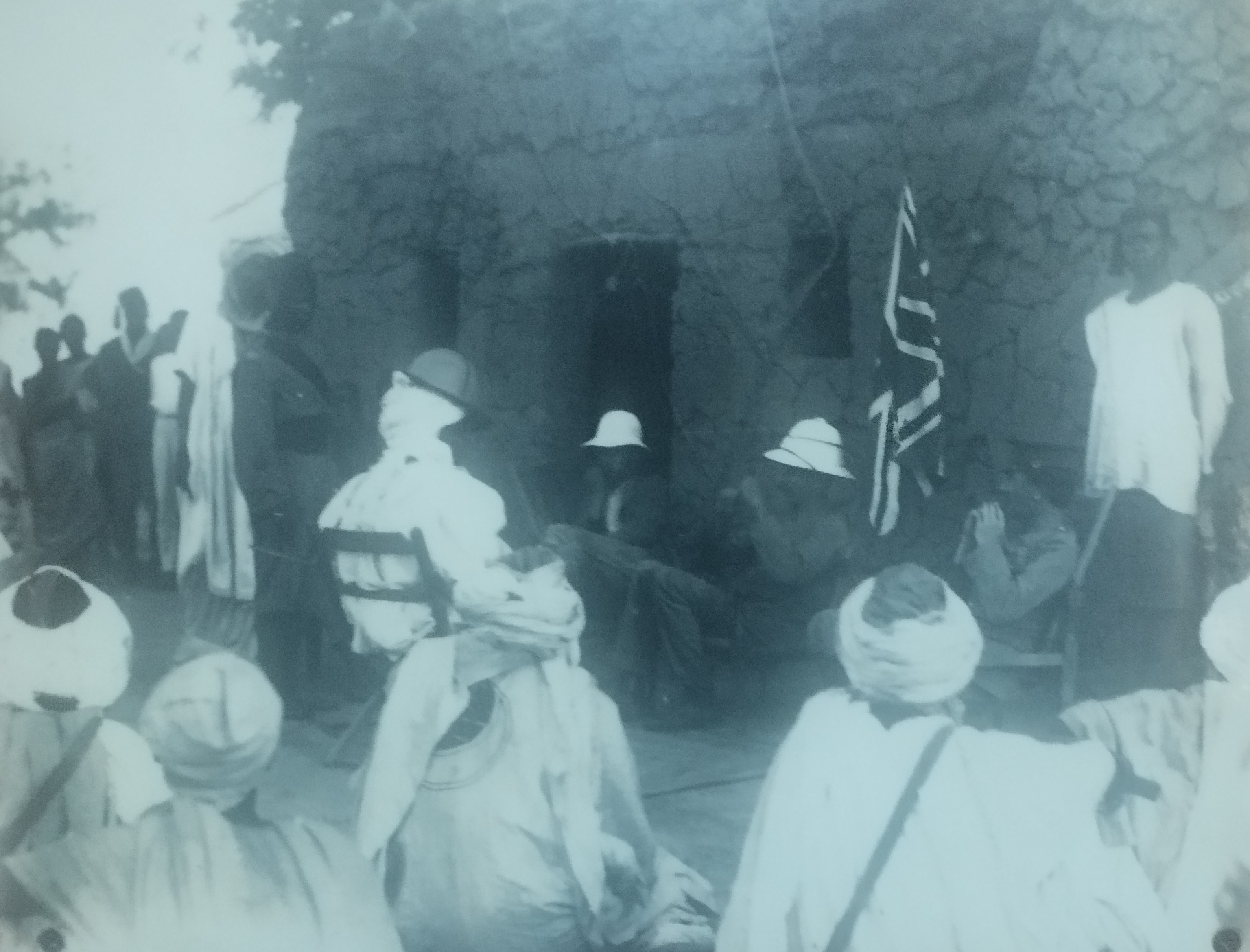
Installation of emir of Kano Abbas

== Early life ==
Little is known about the early life of Muhammad Abbas. During the Third Kanoan civil war, he was loyal to his brothers and later became the Wambai of Kano after Aliyu Babba led the Yusufawa to victory. He escorted Aliyu Babba to Sokoto for the autumn campaign of 1903, when Kano was captured by the British. After the Battle of Kwatarkwashi, he led section of the Kanoan force to surrender to Lugard, for his loyalty, Lugard appointed him Regent of Kano and in May 1903 confirmed him as the emir of Kano.
