= Aminu Ado Bayero =

Emir of Kano

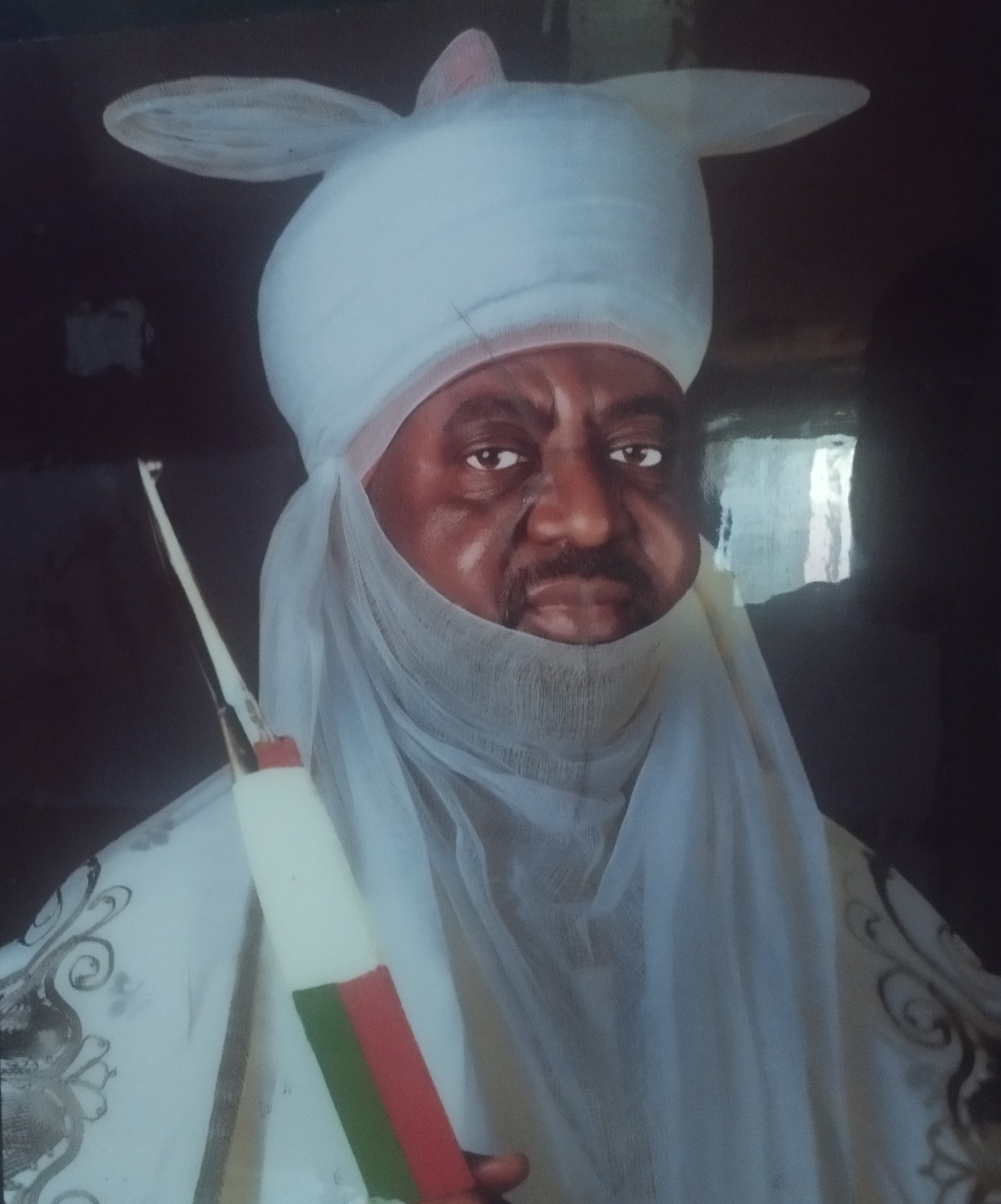

15th Emir of Kano
- Reign: 9 March 2020 – Till date
- Predecessor: Muhammad Sanusi II
- Born: 21 August 1961 (age 64); Kano, Northern Region, Nigeria
Names
- Aminu Ado Bayero
- House: Gidan Dabo
- Father: Ado Bayero
- Mother: Maryam Ado Bayero
- Religion: Islam

Aminu Ado Bayero CFR (born 21 August 1961) is the Emir of Kano having served as the 15th Fulani Emir of Kano from the Fulani Sullubawa clan. He ascended the throne on 9 March 2020, following the deposition of his cousin Muhammad Sanusi II by Governor Abdullahi Umar Ganduje. He is the chancellor of the University of Calabar.

== Early life ==
=== Family ===
Aminu Ado Bayero was born on 21 August 1961. His father, Ado Bayero, was the Emir of Kano from 1963 to 2014 and the longest serving emir in the history of Kano. He is the second eldest son to the late emir. His siblings include his eldest brother Sanusi Ado Bayero, and Nasiru Ado Bayero, the Emir of Bichi. His father's grandnephew, Muhammadu Sanusi II succeeded his father as Emir of Kano from 2014 until 2020 when he was dethroned by the Kano State government.

=== Education ===
Aminu received early Islamic education at home, where he learnt the Quran, Polythem, Islamic jurisprudence and Hadith (traditions of the acts and sayings of Muhammad). He attended Kofar Kudu Primary School and proceeded to Government College, Birnin Kudu. He studied mass communication at the Bayero University Kano and went to Flying College in Oakland, California. He did his one-year mandatory National Youth Service Corps at the Nigeria Television Authority in Makurdi.

== Early career ==
Bayero worked as a public relations officer at Kabo Air, before becoming a flight engineer.

== Titles and engagement ==
In 1990, he was appointed Dan Majen Kano and district head of Dala by his father, Ado Bayero, before being promoted to Dan Buram Kano in October of the same year. In 1992, he was promoted to Turakin Kano and to Sarkin Dawakin Tsakar Gida Kano in 2000. He also served as the chairman of the Kano emirate durbar committee. In 2014, the then emir of Kano, Muhammad Sanusi II, promoted him to Wamban Kano, thereby, transferring him from Dala to Kano municipal where he succeeded Galadiman Kano, Alhaji Tijani Hashim as the district head. In 2019, he was appointed emir of Kano by the governor of Kano State, Abdullahi Umar Ganduje.

In October 2022, a Nigerian national honour of Commander of the Order of the Federal Republic (CFR) was conferred on him by President Muhammadu Buhari.

== Emir of Kano ==
=== Accession and removal ===
He ascended the throne on 9 March 2020, following the deposition of his nephew Muhammad Sanusi II by the Governor of Kano State, Abdullahi Umar Ganduje. Governor Abdullahi Ganduje of Kano State on Saturday 3 July 2021 presented staff of office to the 15th Emir of Kano, Aminu Ado Bayero. In May 2023, a new governor ordered his dethronement and the reinstatement of the previous emir. The deposed emir has since been defiant, refusing to acknowledge his removal, and occupying one of the mini-palaces belonging to the emirate.

Aminu Ado Bayero House of Dabo Born: 1961
Regnal titles
Preceded by Sanusi Lamido Sanusi	Emir of Kano; 2020–2024	Succeeded by Sanusi Lamido Sanusi
