= Sanusi Lamido Sanusi =

Emir of Kano, 2014–2020; since 2024

Muhammadu Sanusi II
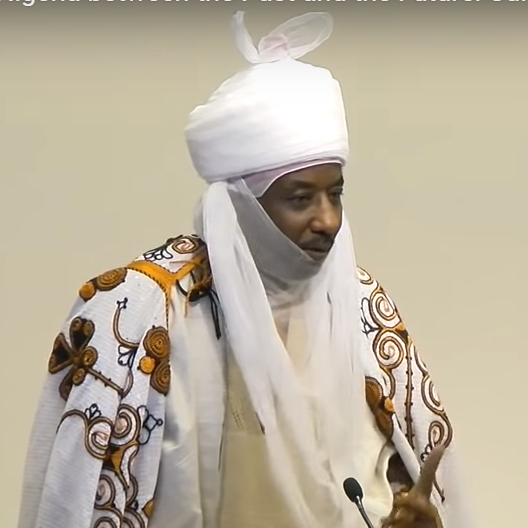

Emir of Kano
- 1st reign: 8 June 2014 – 9 March 2020
- Coronation: 7 February 2015
- Predecessor: Ado Bayero
- Successor: Aminu Ado Bayero
- 2nd reign: 23 May 2024 – present
- Predecessor: Aminu Ado Bayero
- Born: 31 July 1961 (age 65); Kano, Northern Region, Nigeria
- Spouse: List: Sadiya Ado Bayero; Maryam; Rakiya; Sa'adatu Mustafa Barkindo
- Issue: List: Aminu; Shaheeda; Hafsat (Sadeeqa); Saleeha; Khadija; Adam (Ashraf); Mustapha (Imam); Aisha; Husna; Muhammadu Inuwa; Muhammadu Sanusi; Maryam; Halimatu Sadiya (Rafeeqah); Zainab Khausar
Names
- Sanusi Lamido Sanusi
Regnal name
- Muhammad Sanusi II
- House: Dabo
- Father: Aminu Sanusi
- Mother: Saudatu Hussain
- Religion: Sunni Islam
- Education: King's College, Lagos; Ahmadu Bello University; International University of Africa; SOAS University of London (PhD)

Governor of the Central Bank of Nigeria
- In office 3 June 2009 – 20 February 2014
- Appointed by: Umaru Yar'Adua
- Preceded by: Charles Soludo
- Succeeded by: Sarah Alade (acting)

Religious life
- Religion: Islam
- Denomination: Sunni
- Tariqa: Tijaniyyah

Muhammadu Sanusi II, CON (Ajami: محمد السنوسي, Muhammadu Sanusi na biyu; born 31 July 1961), known by the religious title Khalifa Sanusi II (Ajami: خليفة السنوسي), is the spiritual leader (khalifa) of the Tijanniyah Sufi order in Nigeria and the emir (Sarki) of the ancient city-state of Kano. He is a member of the Dabo dynasty and the grandson of Muhammadu Sanusi I. He succeeded his great-uncle Ado Bayero to the throne on 8 June 2014, assuming the regnal name Muhammadu Sanusi II. He spent most of his reign advocating for cultural reform in Northern Nigeria. In 2020, he was deposed by Governor Abdullahi Umar Ganduje and was succeeded by his cousin Aminu Ado Bayero. On 23 May 2024, Governor Abba Kabir Yusuf reinstated Sanusi as emir of Kano.

Sanusi is a prominent traditional and religious figure in West Africa. As the Khalifa of the Tijaniyyah Sufi order of Nigeria and the neighbouring countries, he arguably has a politico-spiritual authority over the second largest Sufi order, with over 50 million adherents. He grew up in the royal palace of his grand-uncle, and as a youth received both religious and secular education. Prior to his accession, Sanusi was an Islamic intellectual, academic, political economist and banker. He served as the Governor of the Central Bank of Nigeria from 2009 to 2014, ushering in banking reforms until his suspension after he made a controversial allegation of $20 billion in government coffers.

== Family ==
Sanusi was born on 31 July 1961 in Kano to a ruling class Fulani family of the Sullubawa clan. He grew up in the palace of his great-uncle Ado Bayero, who reigned for over five decades. His father, Aminu Sanusi, was a prince and diplomat who served as the ambassador to Belgium, China and Canada, and later permanent secretary of the Ministry of Foreign Affairs. He was also the Chiroma of Kano and son of Muhammadu Sanusi I, who was the 11th Fulani Emir of Kano from 1953 to 1963, when he was deposed by his cousin Sir Ahmadu Bello.

== Education ==
Sanusi received early religious education at home, where he learnt Qur'an, Hadith and the traditions of Muhammad. He then attended St. Annes Primary School, a Catholic boarding school in Kaduna, before proceeding to King's College, Lagos from 1973 to 1977. He received a bachelor's degree in Economics from the Ahmadu Bello University in 1981. After graduating, he spent a year undergoing his National Youth Service as a teacher in a girls boarding school in Yola. He then returned to the university where he received a master's degree in Economics in 1983, and lectured at the faculty for two years.

Sanusi later moved to Khartoum where he read Islamic studies at the International University of Africa. He became fluent in Arabic and also studied the Qur'an, law (fiqh) and philosophy (falsafa), amongst others, he read the works of prominent Western thinkers and Islamic authorities and was also exposed to the four Sunni madhhabs of Hanafi, Maliki, Shafi'i and Hanbali.

Sanusi was awarded a PhD in Islamic law in 2024 from the School of Oriental and African Studies at the University of London. His thesis was titled: Codification of Islamic Family Law as an Instrument of Social Reform: A Case Study of the Emirate of Kano and a Comparison with the Kingdom of Morocco. It examined the codification of Islamic Family Law as a tool for social reform in Muslim-majority societies, using the ongoing effort in Kano State as a case study. Sanusi concluded that while the 2019 draft Kano State Code of Muslim Personal Status represented a significant step toward social reform inspired by Morocco's 2004 Family Law, it still fell short in addressing issues such as early marriage, maintenance, domestic violence, and unfair treatment in polygamous marriages. He recommended gradual reform process that is mindful of local realities, including through amendments to certain provisions of the draft code, improvements in social policy around education, and strengthening of arbitral institutions and processes to ensure more equitable treatment, especially for women.

== Banking ==
In 1985, Sanusi began his banking career when he was hired by Icon Limited (a subsidiary of Barings Bank and Morgan Guaranty Trust) – as a merchant banker before later becoming head of financial services and manager of the office in Kano. He left the bank in 1991, when he travelled to Sudan, to pursue studies in Arabic and Islamic studies at the International University of Africa in Khartoum. In 1997, he returned to Nigeria and joined the United Bank for Africa working in the credit and risk management division – he rose through the ranks to the position of general manager. In 2005, Sanusi became a board member and executive director in charge of risk management at First Bank of Nigeria – Nigeria's oldest bank, and one of Africa's largest financial institutions. In January 2009, Sanusi became the chief executive officer, becoming the first northern Nigerian to head the bank.

On 1 June 2009, Sanusi was nominated as Governor of the Central Bank of Nigeria by President Umaru Musa Yar'Adua; his appointment was confirmed by the Nigerian Senate on 3 June 2009, during the Great Recession in Africa. In Nigeria, the effect of the crisis took a hit at the economy and the banking system, with the stock market collapsing by nearly 70%. It was amidst this crisis that Sanusi led the central bank in rescuing top tier banks with over ₦600 billion of public money, dismissing and imprisoning chief executives who had mismanaged customer deposits – and strictly dealing with banks found responsible for financial crimes. Sanusi attributed the crash in the capital markets to "financial illiteracy" on the part of Nigerian investors. He also introduced a consolidation process which reduced the number of Nigerian banks through merger and acquisitions, in a bid to make them stronger and more accountable to depositors. He also led efforts in increasing the level of investment in infrastructure and support for small and medium enterprises.

Sanusi's tenure initiated several extensive banking reforms termed the "Sanusi Tsunami". The reforms were built around four pillars: enhancing the quality of banks, establishing financial stability, enabling healthy financial sector evolution and ensuring the financial sector contributes to the real economy. Sanusi developed the cashless policy – whereby financial transactions are not conducted with money in the form of physical banknotes or coins, but rather through the transfer of digital information (usually an electronic representation of money) between the transacting parties; he also introduced and supported the establishment of Islamic banking in Nigeria, a move which was criticized by the Christian Association of Nigeria. He also clashed with the National Assembly, over its budgetary spending of 25% of all government revenue; and rejected the International Monetary Fund insistence for a currency devaluation. He also advised the government on the removal of the fuel subsidy, which he argued engendered a culture of high level corruption and economic inefficiency – the removal of the subsidy was unpopular and led to the Occupy Nigeria movement, which called for his resignation.

His reforms received both criticism and appraisal from the industry. The Banker magazine recognised him as the 2010 Central Bank Governor of the Year, for his reforms and leading a radical anti-corruption campaign in the sector – the first of its kind during the 2008 financial crisis. Sanusi is widely recognized for pacifying the overtly corrupt banking industry and his contribution to a risk management culture in Nigerian banking. Sanusi has spoken at a number of international events including the 2013 World Economic Forum. In December 2013, Sanusi in a leaked letter to President Goodluck Jonathan revealed that the Nigeria National Petroleum Corporation (NNPC) failed to remit US$48.9 billion of government oil revenue to the central bank – the NNPC has a history of financial irregularities and oversees the corrupt petroleum industry in Nigeria. On 20 February 2014, after a series of public investigations and raising the alarm on the US$20 billion NNPC scandal, Sanusi was suspended as Governor of the Central Bank of Nigeria by President Goodluck Jonathan. Nigerian secret police SSS seized his international travel documents and charged him with terrorism financing on 31 March 2014. Three days later, Sanusi won a court case against the SSS and federal government, after he was detained and his international passport confiscated by the State Security Service.

== Interregnum ==
On 6 June 2014, Emir Ado Bayero who reigned as Emir of Kano for over five decades died, and a succession crisis loomed amongst the royal family. On 8 June 2014, Sanusi a grandson of former Emir Muhammadu Sanusi I; and holder of the traditional title of Dan Majen Kano (Son of Emir-Maje) emerged as the new Emir of Kano. His accession led to widespread protests from supporters of Sanusi Ado Bayero the Chiroman Kano (Crown Prince) and son of the late Emir Ado Bayero, with allegations that Governor Rabiu Kwankwaso interfered with the king-making process.

== First reign ==
Emir Sanusi at the Durbar in 2017

On 8 June 2014, Sanusi was selected to succeed his granduncle, Ado Bayero, as the Emir of Kano. His enthronement was controversial, with some believing that it was a politically motivated move to avoid corruption charges from his tenure at the central bank. Many expected Bayero's son to succeed him, and protested Sanusi's appointment. He was crowned Sarki Muhammadu Sunusi II (anglicized as Sanusi) on 9 June 2014, the fifty-seventh monarch of the ancient-city Kano; hierarchically the fourth-most-important Islamic traditional ruler in Nigeria after the Sultan of Sokoto, Shehu of Borno and Emir of Gwandu.

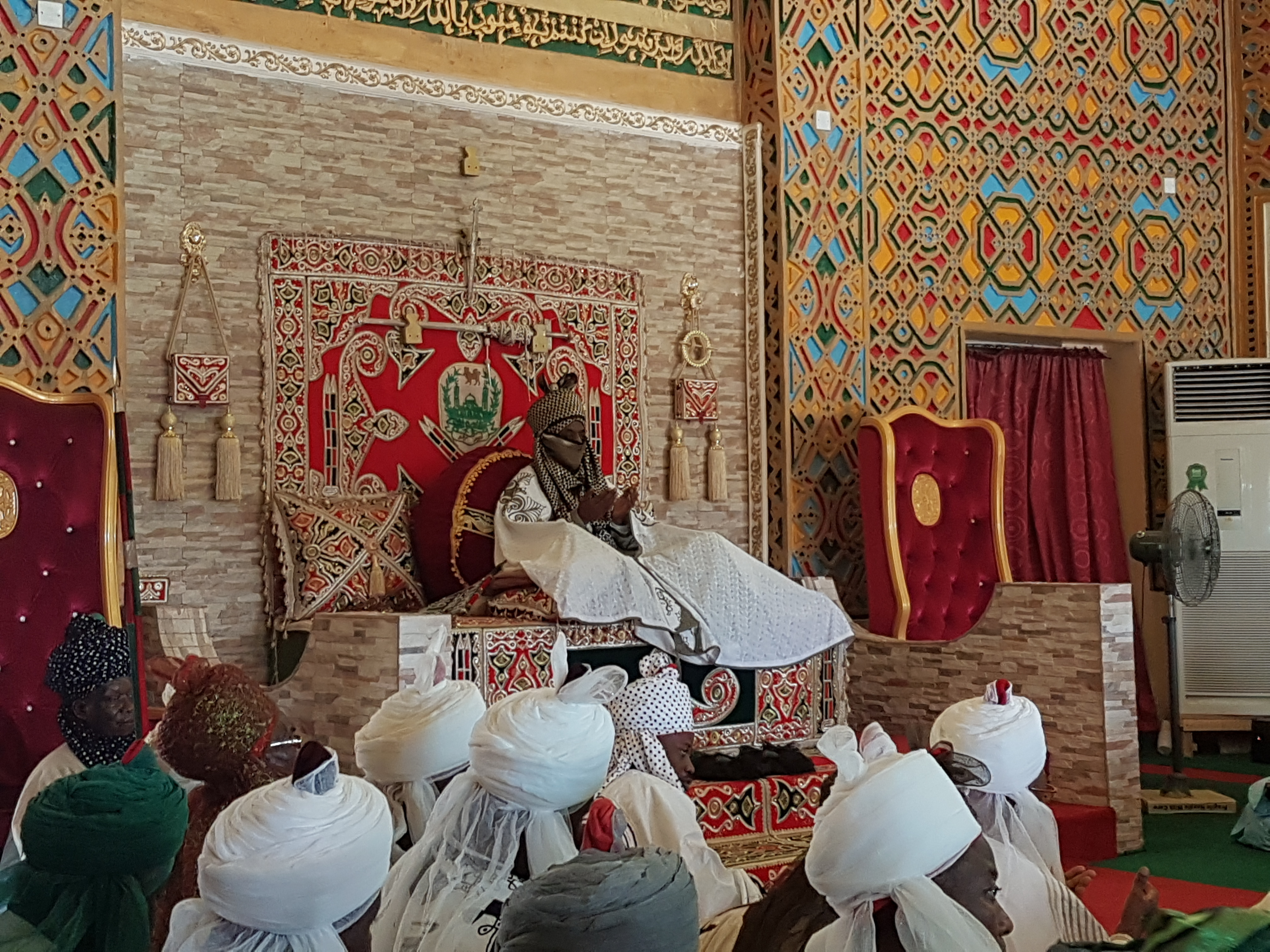
Sanusi before the Durbar in September 2016

In November 2014, after Sanusi urged his followers to fight Boko Haram, the Great Mosque of Kano was bombed, with over 150 casualties. In December 2014, Boko Haram leader Abubakar Shekau accused Sanusi of deviating from Islam and threatened his life. Sanusi replied that he is "safe with Allah", and likened Shekau's extremist comments (describing Sufis as unbelievers) to those of the heretical Islamic preacher Maitatsine.

During Sanusi's six-year reign, The Emir reinvented himself as a charismatic figure at the crossroads of tradition and modernity. Major developments, such as the drafting of a new Muslim family law, construction of a 40,000 books library and vernacular modernization of the 15th century palace took place; and the Durbar festival was promoted internationally. Tourism to heritage sites such as the ancient Dala Hill and Gidan Makama increased and was encouraged by Sanusi. The Emir also played a role in revamping the ancient city's cultural objects including in clothing where he advocated for the revival of the moribund 14th century dye pits at Kofar Mata – and through his own style and drapery projected the craftsmanship of the city's leading guilds.

Sanusi also spoke out on government policies, breaking with royal tradition. He criticised the government of misplaced priorities. In 2017, the emirate council was under investigation for financial irregularities. Many saw this as retribution over comments he made against the state government. The investigation was later called off by the state legislature following intervention by the ruling class. In 2019, Governor Abdullahi Umar Ganduje signed into law the creation of four new emirates; Bichi, Rano, Gaya and Karaye. This unprecedented move saw the partitioning of Sanusi's traditional domain as Emir. According to the law, out of the 44 local government areas in the state, Sanusi as Emir of Kano will preside over just 10 local government areas; with the remainder carved up amongst the new emirates. In March 2020, the state legislature launched a new investigation against The Emir for violation of "traditional practices", this was coming after a high court ruling restraining the corruption investigation against Sanusi.

== Dethronement ==
On 9 March 2020, Sanusi was dethroned by Governor Abdullahi Ganduje. Sanusi was in his private residence in Gidan Rumfa when he learnt of his removal, while awaiting for state officials to formally serve him the deposition letter a contingent of police, military, and security operatives stormed the palace. Sanusi later accepted his dethronement as a divine act and urged his supporters to remain calm and avoid bloodshed. He also urged them to declare bay'ah to his successor Aminu Ado Bayero, and stated "It is a thing of pride that made us to rule and end in the same fashion as the Khalifa," in reference to his grandfather Muhammadu Sanusi I, who was also deposed and exiled in 1963.

== Years in exile ==
Sanusi was later informed of his exile from Kano to Nasarawa State. Initially wanting to serve his exile in Lagos with his family, his request was denied and was later escorted out of the palace under heavy guard to a military air base. His lawyers subsequently announced they are going to challenge his arbitrary exile in court. Sanusi was then flown to Abuja, en route to Loko in Nassarawa. On 10 March, he was relocated from Loko via police helicopter to Awe, a remote local government area in the state. On 13 March, a Federal High Court in Abuja ordered the release of Sanusi, he subsequently left Awe together with Governor Nasir El Rufai, after leading Friday prayers in full regalia to Lagos.

Sanusi stated that he would not challenge his dethronement and intended to go on with his activities as a private citizen. He ruled out the possibility of entry into politics, and was focusing his time on writing and academic pursuits. He was a visiting scholar at the University of Oxford’s African Studies Centre, where he set about publishing a book about his role as central bank governor during the 2008 financial crisis. He also made plans to write on Muslim law and cultural practices in northern Nigeria. In June 2021, Sanusi released a compendium of his articles from 1999 to 2005. On 10 May 2021, Sanusi was appointed as leader (khalifa) of the Tijaniyyah Sufi order in Nigeria, an important position which was held by his grandfather, with immense religious authority in West Africa.

== Second reign ==
On 23 May 2024, the governor of Kano State, Abba Kabir Yusuf reinstated Sanusi as emir of Kano. Sanusi had been deposed as emir four years earlier by former Governor Abdullahi Umar Ganduje who led the balkanization of the Kano Emirate and eventual dethronement of Sanusi. The new law signed by Governor Kabir Yusuf repealed the Kano State Emirates Council Law, 2019, and dissolved the five emirate councils created by the former state government which led to the removal of Sanusi's cousins emir of Bichi Nasiru Ado Bayero and the emir of Kano Aminu Ado Bayero. The deposed emir Bayero remained in Kano alongside members of his royal court filing legal charges against the reinstatement of Sanusi led by Alhaji Aminu Baba Dan Agundi the Sarkin Dawakin Babba of the Kano Emirate (Master of the Horse). The deposed emir has relied on alleged federal support to assert his claim to the throne, including from Ganduje the former governor and APC ruling party chairman who deposed and exiled Sanusi in 2020; Ribadu the national security adviser; and some allegations of former president Buhari, whose son Yusuf is married to Nasiru Ado Bayero's daughter. The emir of Kano is a significant position in the Nigerian Muslim north and the reinstament of Sanusi was viewed by many as politicking towards the next general election in 2027.

Kano has a significant voting population with major political personalities: Kabir Yusuf, Kwankwaso, and Ganduje of the APC. Sanusi as the emir bridges the brinkmanship of the politicians, albeit, it has been suggested that he might seek elective office for himself. On 10 January 2025, a state appeal court ruled in favor of Sanusi's reinstatement, ruling that the federal high court which first heard the case against Sanusi's restoration by the Ado Bayero faction had no jurisdiction to adjudicate on traditional rulers which is ostensibly under the purview of the state courts in Nigeria's federal system. A few days after the state court ruling, Sanusi was in Lagos where he criticized the trajectory of the economic reforms pursued by the Tinubu administration. On 15 March 2025, the federal high court in Abuja suspended the 10 January ruling given in favour of Sanusi's reinstatement pending a final judgement from the supreme court of Nigeria, guaranteeing maintenance of the “status quo ante bellum”, prior to the Federal High Court’s judgement on 13 June 2024, ergo prolonging the royal crisis in Kano.

Sanusi supports the Dangote Refinery, noting the petrochemical complex has paved the way for Nigeria to become a net fuel exporter. In October 2025, speaking at the 31st Nigerian Economic Summit held in Abuja, Sanusi described the CBN’s first rate cut in five years as “premature”, highlighting that “This is the first time in eight years that the economy is growing faster than the population growth, especially at a time when prices are moderating. In a television interview Sanusi supported the Tinubu administration’s first-term economic reforms as pulling the country from the brink of economic collapse. While supporting Tinubu's reforms, Sanusi has acknowledged they were implemented at the wrong time and no complementary measures were taken to tighten monetary supply beforehand in order to address a naira free-fall. Sanusi attended the rededicating of the National Theatre, Nigeria in Lagos held on 1 October 2025 in honour of Wole Soyinka. On 19 April 2026, the Supreme Court of Nigeria postponed its hearing on the Kano royal crisis until 2027. Ganduje finally recognised Sanusi as the emir of Kano on 5 May 2026, during the inauguration of the Deputy Governor of Kano State Murtala Sule Garo. Sanusi favors the removal of costly fuel subsidies and liberalization of the exchange rate as necessary measures, however, he has continued to criticize the governments rising borrowing.

== Views ==
Sanusi has over the years as a public intellectual written on topics ranging from Islam to political economy. He has debated and authored a number of papers articulating his views on:

=== Islam ===
Sanusi's position has two underlying themes: Islam is concerned with justice and should not be a tool for self-seeking political agendas, and the violent persecution of the Sufi orders by Wahhabist fundamentalists counters genuine Muslim interests. He has written about the role of women in society in his paper, Shariah and the Woman Question. And has also described his views on non-Muslims. Sanusi has adopted the mainstream position that zakat is an instrument for redistributing income, arguing in favour of giving the role of redistribution to the government.

Sanusi has also advocated for family planning to solve almajiranci. He has called for an end to child marriage, women empowerment, use of mosques for education. He has said that polygamy is increasing poverty in the region and supports population planning. He has also defended his views on Islam in Africa – and has opposed the external influence on the continent's religious life, "Wahhabism and Salafism have a certain intolerance in common with groups such as Boko Haram. Islam in Africa has its own schools of thought, its ancient empires and its own history. And we have no need for Saudi Arabia and Iran to explain Islam to us."

=== Culture ===
Sanusi has called for a cultural revival in Northern Nigeria. In his works he has described his views regarding the Hausa–Fulani cultural hegemony, and is a supporter of Nigeria's unity in diversity. Sanusi has criticized postcolonialism and maintaining English as an official language stating "If you take Kano, for 600-700 years the official language was Arabic. We had British colonialism for 60 years, and today the official language in Nigeria is English. Arabic is not an official language".

He has also spoken out for the need to revive the Trans-Saharan trade stating that "The Sahel was a major part of global commerce; it was the transit point of trade from Asia to the Atlantic and to Europe. The cities of the Sahel – Timbuktu, Gao, Kano, Agadez – were the richest cities in Africa before the steamship, before colonialism. Many of the countries in the Sahel are part of a great Arab Islamic civilisation – the official language of communication was Arabic."

=== Politics ===
Sanusi believes that fundamental constitutional amendments are required to address misgovernance in Nigeria. He has raised questions on Nigeria's extremely-high cost of governance and opposes having a full time bicameral legislature, 36 states with governors and deputies, and thousands of government aides. He has also called for an overhaul of the Nigerian Civil Service, describing the institution as inefficient and over bloated. Since 2013, Sanusi has ruled out participating in Nigerian politics and seeking elective office stating in a BBC HARDTalk interview "I cannot survive in Nigerian politics". He has said with regards to the damaging effect of unprincipled politics on the society "our duty as Muslims is to learn from the ideals of Muhammad to save the society from eminent danger that is facing it". Sanusi has also spoken against sycophancy in politics urging advisers and ministers to political office holders to speak truth to power.

=== Economy ===
Sanusi favors deep economic structural reforms and a more "interventionist, directional economic policy" to be implemented in Nigeria. He has also called for the diversification of the economy away from oil, and has also criticized financialization for creating a "fake economy" and not having sufficient impact on the real economy. He has also supported the use of state-owned banks and development finance as a catalyst for industrialization. On bank ownerships he is of the view that "The owners and managers of banks, the rich borrowers and their clients in the political establishment are one and the same class of people protecting their interest, and trampling underneath their feet the interest of the poor with impunity".

On his introduction of Islamic banking to Nigeria, he elaborated his view that Islamic finance is a resilient alternative; stating "Islamic banking, if well harnessed, would ensure large numbers of people are economically independent", he also noted in the past proponents of interest-free banking included Aristotle, Adam Smith, and Alfred Marshall.

=== Corruption ===
As central bank governor, he led a radical anti-corruption campaign, dismissing Cecilia Ibru and other powerful bank heads who had mismanaged customer deposits, and (in the case of two senior bankers) imprisoned. According to Sanusi, there was no choice but to attack the powerful and interrelated vested interests who were exploiting the financial system. Sanusi has spoken out against the fuel subsidy – he cites the high level of corruption and the inefficiency of subsidizing consumption instead of production (leading to slower economic growth), and the fact that the government borrows money to finance the subsidy—taxing future generations so present Nigerians can consume more fuel.

Sanusi revealed that Nigeria lost a billion dollars a month to diversion of funds under the Jonathan administration. The PBS segment quoted American and British officials that former petroleum minister Diezani Alison-Madueke might have organized a diversion of $6 billion (₦1.2 trillion) from the Nigerian treasury. Alison-Madueke said Sanusi made the allegations due to her refusal to get him appointed as President of the African Development Bank, which Sanusi rejected. In 2015, Alison-Madueke was arrested in London. Sanusi has criticised Buhari's anti-corruption war, arguing that his administration's foreign exchange policy is creating a nouveau riche class and promoting the rentier economy.

== Activities ==
Sanusi's private, humanitarian and intellectual activities include:

- PhD, Islamic Law, University of London
- Academic Visitor, University of Oxford, African Studies Centre, Oxford School of Global and Area Studies
- United Nations Sustainable Development Goals Advocate
- Chairman of Babban Gona, a private agricultural initiative helping rural farmers
- Chairman of Black Rhino, a Sub-Saharan Africa infrastructure fund of The Blackstone Group
- Chairman of the advisory board of 1 Million Teachers, a non-governmental education organization
- Independent Non-Executive Director, MTN Group
- Vice Chairman of Kaduna Investment Promotion Agency
- Chancellor of the Kaduna State University
- Chairman of the Katsina Vocational Training Center

== Overseas visits ==
Sanusi has spoken at a number of international events, including the 2013 World Economic Forum. As Emir of Kano, he travelled extensively including as part of a United Nations delegation to the Svalbard seed vault. In August 2023, during the crisis following the coup d'état in Niger, he went to Niamey to mediate with the putschists, and notably met Abdourahamane Tiani. He later said he went there on a private capacity. Sanusi represented the government of Kano State at the Eightieth session of the United Nations General Assembly.

== Honours ==
- Commander of the Order of the Niger
- In 2010, The Banker recognised him as the 2010 Central Bank Governor of the Year (worldwide) and Central Bank Governor of the Year for Africa.
- In 2011, Time magazine listed him on the 100 most influential people of 2011.
- In 2013, Sanusi was honoured at the third Global Islamic Finance Awards (GIFA) in Dubai for his advocacy in promoting Islamic banking and finance during his tenure as Governor of the Central Bank of Nigeria.
- In 2015, Sanusi received the Global Leadership in Islamic Finance Award as the fifth GIFA Laureate, following Tun Abdullah Badawi (2011), Sultan Nazrin Shah (2012), Shaukat Aziz (2013) and Nursultan Nazarbayev (2014).
- In 2018, Sanusi received an honorary doctorate from the Nile University of Nigeria.
- In 2019, Sanusi received an honorary doctorate from SOAS University of London.

== Personal life ==
Sanusi has 4 wives and 14 children, 5 sons and 9 daughters.

== Patrilineal descent ==
Patrilineal descent
Sanusi is the first Dabo prince to become emir in the two centuries rule of the family without his father reigning. His patriline is the line from which he is descended father to son.

Patrilineal descent is the principle behind membership in royal houses, as it can be traced back through the generations, which means that Sanusi is a member of the Dabo dynasty.

Royal House of Kano

Descent is traced back patrilineally to Ibrahim Dabo

1. Ibrahim Dabo dan Mahmudu (ruled 1819–1846)
2. Usman I Maje Ringim dan Dabo (ruled 1846–1855)
3. Abdullahi Maje Karofi dan Dabo (ruled 1855–1883)
4. Muhammadu Bello dan Dabo (ruled 1883–1893)
5. Muhammadu Tukur dan Bello (ruled 1893–1894)
6. Aliyu Babba dan Maje Karofi (ruled 1894–1903)
7. Muhammad Abbass Dan Maje Karofi (ruled 1903–1919)
8. Usman II dan Maje Karofi (ruled 1919–1926)
9. Abdullahi Bayero Dan Abbas (ruled 1926–1953)
10. Muhammadu Sanusi I Dan Bayero (ruled 1954–1963)
11. Muhammad Inuwa Dan Abbas (ruled 1963 - he served for 3 months only)
12. Ado Bayero Dan Abdu Bayero (ruled 1963–2014)
13. Muhammadu Sanusi II dan Aminu Sanusi (ruled 2014–2020)
14. Aminu Ado Bayero (2020–2024)
15. Muhammadu Sanusi II dan Aminu Sanusi (2024-)

== Writings ==
- For the Good of the Nation - an outline of Muhammadu Sanusi II's opinion of the optimal course for Nigeria
- Muhammadu Sanusi II has written a number of articles on social matters (the family and women), political matters (globalization), legal issues (Islamic law and constitutionalism), historical topics (the Fulani in History), and several pieces on political economy.

Sanusi Lamido Sanusi House of Dabo Born: 31 July 1961
Regnal titles
Preceded by Ado Bayero	Emir of Kano; 2014–2020	Succeeded by Aminu Ado Bayero
