= Abdullahi Bayero =

Emir of Kano from 1926 to 1953

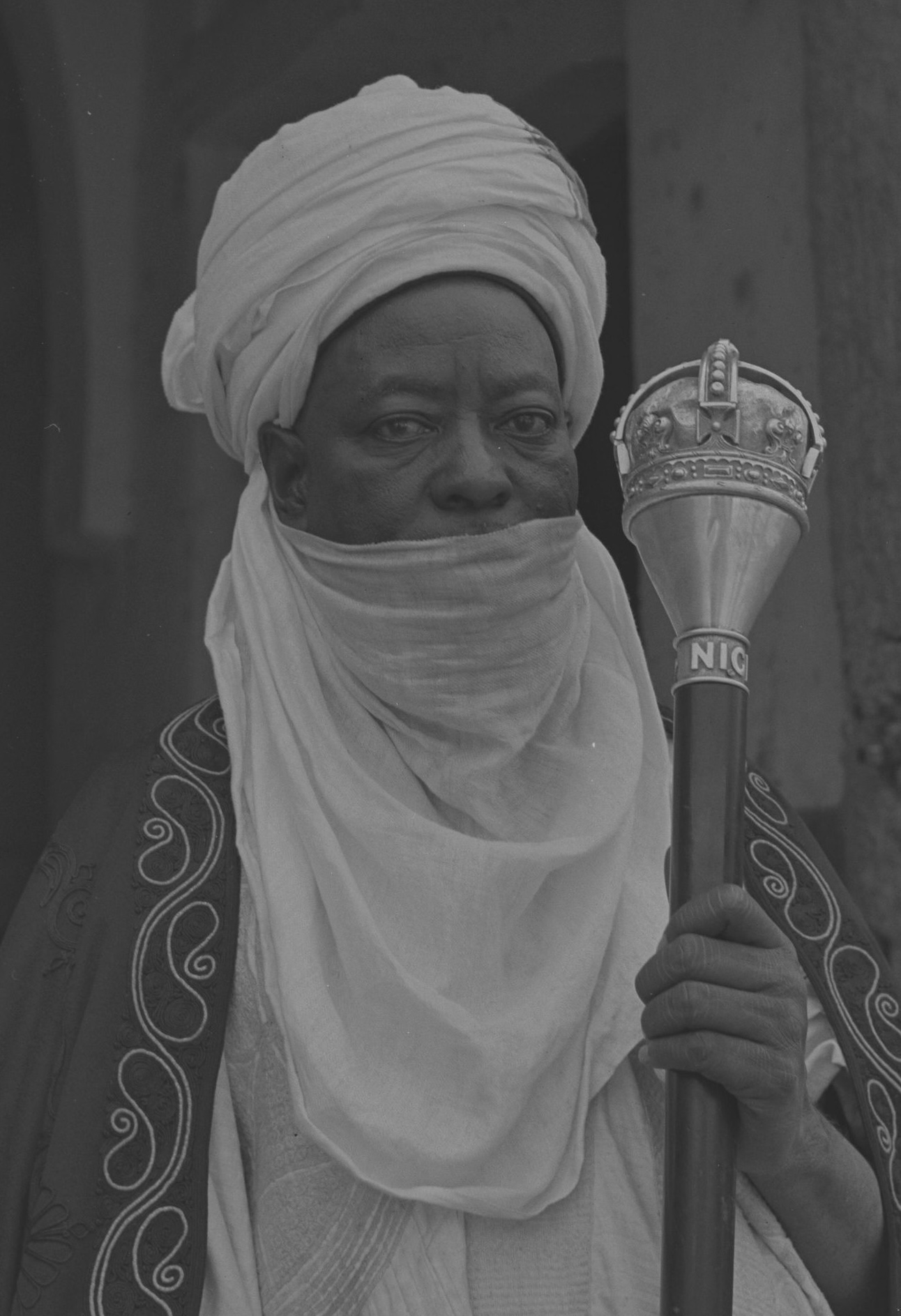
- Taken between 1930 and 1953

10th Emir of Kano
- Reign: April 1926 – 23 December 1953
- Coronation: 14 February 1927
- Predecessor: Usman II
- Successor: Muhammadu Sanusi I

Chiroma of Kano
- In office 1917 – April 1926
- Monarch: Muhammad Abbas
- Succeeded by: Muhammad Sanusi I

Waziri of Kano
- In office 1903–1907
- Monarch: Muhammad Abbas
- Succeeded by: Allah Bar Sarki
- Born: 1881; Kano, Kano Emirate, Sokoto Caliphate
- Died: 23 December 1953 (aged 71–72)
- Issue: Muhammadu Sanusi I; Ado Bayero
Names
- Abdullahi Bayero ɗan Muhammad Abbas
- Father: Muhammad Abbas

Alhaji Abdullahi Bayero CMG CBE (born Abdullahi ɗan Muhammad Abbas; 1881 – 23 December 1953) was Emir of Kano from 1926 until his death in 1953. Under the British colonial system of indirect rule, he oversaw the administering of the Kano Province of the Northern Region of Colonial Nigeria.

== Early years ==
Bayero was born in 1299 AH (1881). He received his early Islamic education at the Sarki’s palace and he was guided by the prominent Islamic scholars of his time. While he was the Chiroma of Kano and District Head of Bichi he became very closely associated with the prominent Ulama.

When the British colonial administrators introduced the new district administrative structure Abdullahi Bayero, who was then Chiroma, was appointed the Head of the Home Districts with headquarters at Dawakin Kudu and later (1914) at Panisau. He was appointed Sarki Kano in April 1926 and was formally installed on 14 February 1927. He was the most experienced contender for the Emirship and had also proved that he was honest, efficient, dedicated and upright.

== Life career ==
Sarki Kano Abdullahi Bayero made several appointments during his long reign. Among those he appointed were his sons Muhammad Sanusi whom he appointed Ciroma and District Head of Bichi, the position he held before his appointment as the Sarki; and Aminu who was appointed Dan Iya and District Head of Dawakin Kudu. After the deposition of Muhammad son of Sarki Kano Shehu Usman from Turaki and District Head of Ungogo he appointed his brothers Abdulkadir and Muhammad Inuwa as Galadima and Turaki respectively in 1927. He reduced the influence of the Cucanawa and also freed all other royal slaves, which was in line with the British anti slavery policy. He also delegated some of his executive responsibilities to his councilors.

As Sarki Kano Bayero was committed to the commercial and industrial development of Kano he encouraged genuine industrial undertakings: for example the Gwamaja Textile Mills, which was the first modern textile producer in Nigeria. He also encouraged indigenous individual entrepreneurs such as the highly successful Alhaji Alhassan Dantata. The social service sector was accorded the necessary attention by his Emirate Council.

Kano city was the first place in the North to have electricity and a water supply on a large scale. This was chiefly the result of the initiative of Abdullahi Bayero, who proposed in 1927 that surplus funds in the Native Administration accounts be used to provide an electricity and a water supply for the whole of Kano. Until then, these services had been supplied only to the Government area.

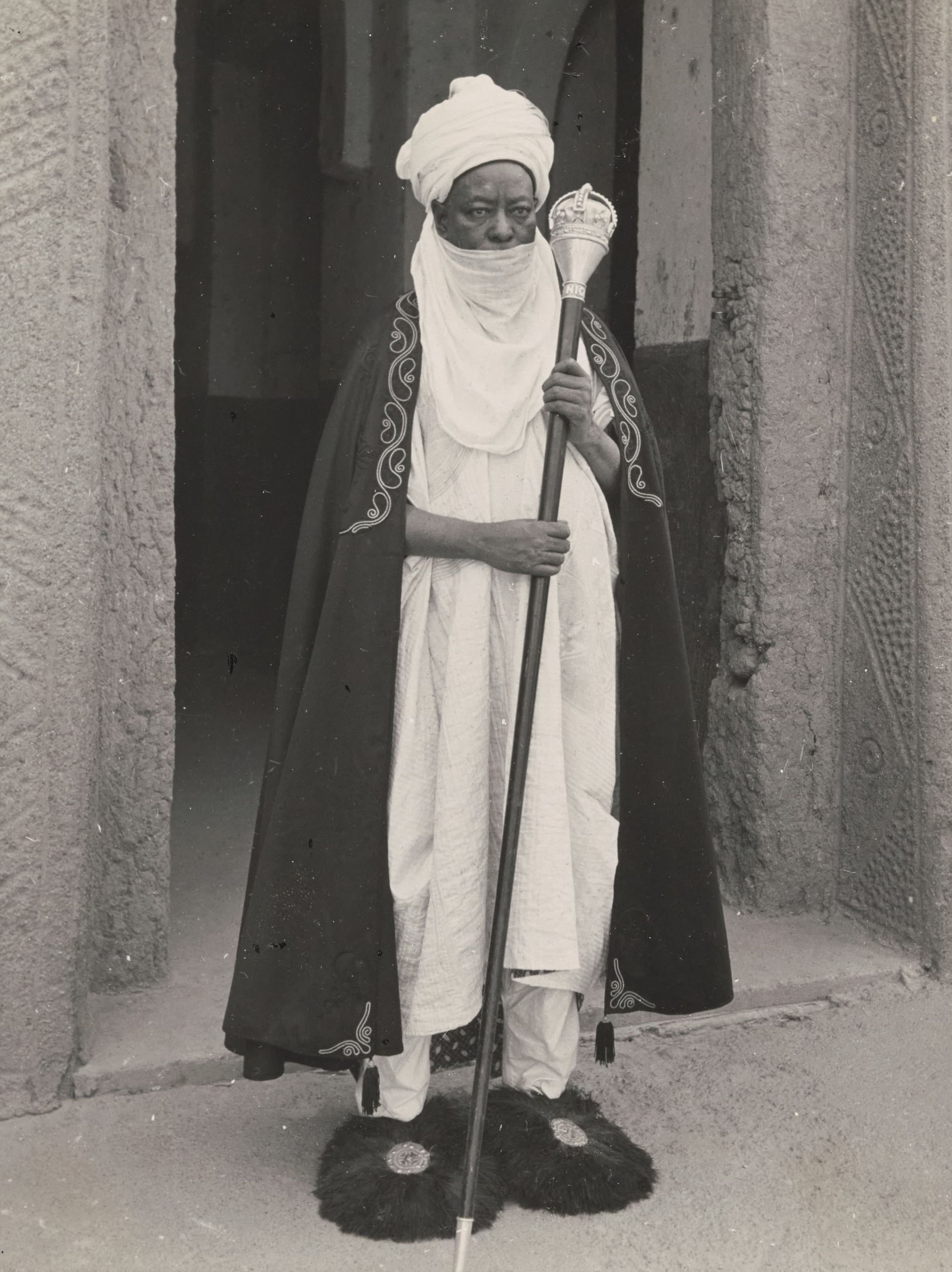
Bayero wears a cloak, an embroidered gown, wide trousers, and a turban, while on his feet are ostrich-feather slippers. He holds his silver-headed staff of office as a First Class Chief of Nigeria.

The Public Works Department in Lagos strongly opposed these proposals on the grounds of expense and lack of availability of staff to undertake the work. Nevertheless, the Native Administration went ahead and obtained estimates from a contractor and the work began. Water was pumped from the Challawa River ten miles from the town and each compound in the city was provided with at least one lamp standard. In 1929 the scheme was formally opened amidst great celebrations. Initially maintained by the Native Administration's own staff, the scheme proved to be a great success and soon paid for itself.

== Islamic study contribution ==
Sarki Kano Abdullahi Bayero had a keen interest in Islamic education and he contributed morally and materially towards its development. As a result of this, Kano had many prominent Islamic scholars during his reign, including Shehu Muhammad Salga and his students Abubakar Mijinyawa and Umar Falke. He established the Shahuchi Judicial School in 1348 AH (1929), the first of its kind in Nigeria with Shaikh Sulaiman, his long term colleague, who initiated the idea as its first headmaster. The Kano Law School, which later became the School for Arabic Studies, grew from the Shahuchi Judicial School through the efforts of Waziri Gidado (Yahya 1986), who was then the Chief Islamic and Legal Adviser of the Sarki. He was also encouraged the showing of respect to the Shariffs by Shaikh Sulaiman (Paden 1973), his initiator into the Tijaniyya (a mystic sufi brotherhood founded by Shaikh Ahmad al-Tijani of Algeria).

Sarki Kano Abdullahi Bayero was the first Sarki to perform the Hajj, hence he is popularly known as Sarki Alhaji. He was accompanied on this journey by his younger brother Galadima Abdulkadir and Ma’aji Mallam Sulaiman, who later became the first Walin Kano. It was during this Hajj trip that they first met Shaikh Ibrahim Niass of Senegal and they accepted him as their Shaykh. After the Hajj, Sarki Abdullahi visited Egypt where he saw many magnificent mosques. When he returned he began the building of the new Kano mosque.

== Politics ==
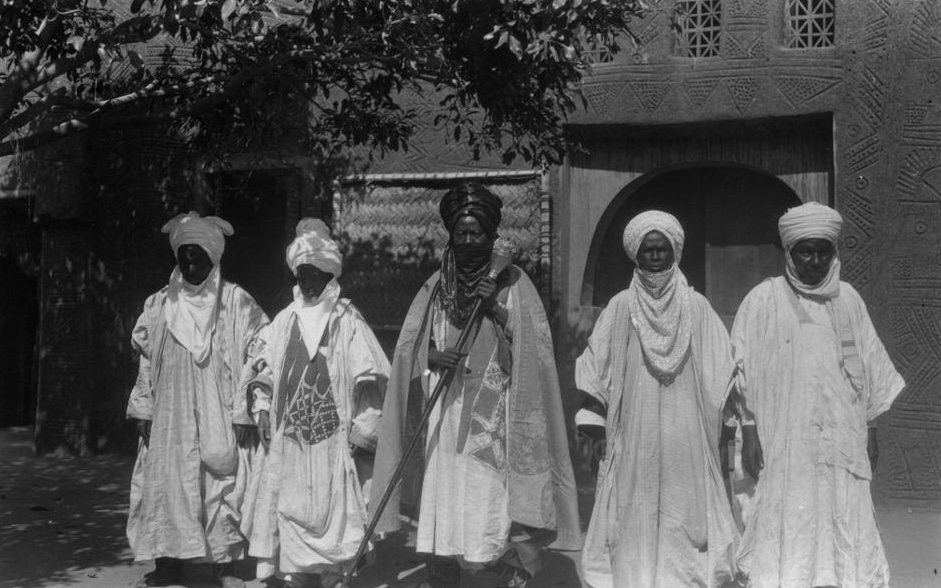
Likely taken between 1930 and 1931 by Gustaf Bolinder

Towards the end of his reign the Northern Elements Progressive Union (NEPU) was formed by the following Kano politicians: Abba Maikwaru, Bello Ijumu, Babaliya Manaja, Musa Kaula, Abdulkadir Danjaji, Musa Bida, Magaji Dambatta and Mudi Spikin (Abba 2000: ix). This was a radical political party which questioned colonial rule and the traditional establishment. But Sarkin Kano Abdullahi Bayero was very cautious. When the NEPU leaders were brought before his court for alleged sedition and the palace officials including Ulama advised the Emir that they were not Muslims and deserved death, he refused to accept this advice, arguing that 'we must have done something wrong for these young men to challenge us'.

Sarki Kano Alhaji Abdullahi Bayero never compromised his Islamic convictions despite his progressive ideas (Yahya 1986). He will be remembered in the history of Kano as a sincere, honest, pious and patient Sarki. He was a man of great simplicity who used to sew his own clothes and was very caring for his junior staff, as in the case of Inuwa Wali, when the Sarki directed one of the ward heads, against the wishes of the courtiers, to ensure that he was given a house. He was eventually given a house in the Mandawari quarters, where he lived for more than fifty years.

Sarki Kano Alhaji Abdullahi Bayero died on Thursday 13th Rabi al-Thani 1373 (23 December 1953).

== External reading ==
- Dalhatu, Usman. Abdullahi Bayero: the pre-eminent Emir of Kano. Woodpecker Communication Services, 2005
- Light, Ivan Hubert. Ethnic enterprise in America: Business and welfare among Chinese, Japanese, and Blacks. Univ of California Press, 1972.
