= Muhammadu Sanusi I =

Emir of Kano (1900–1991)

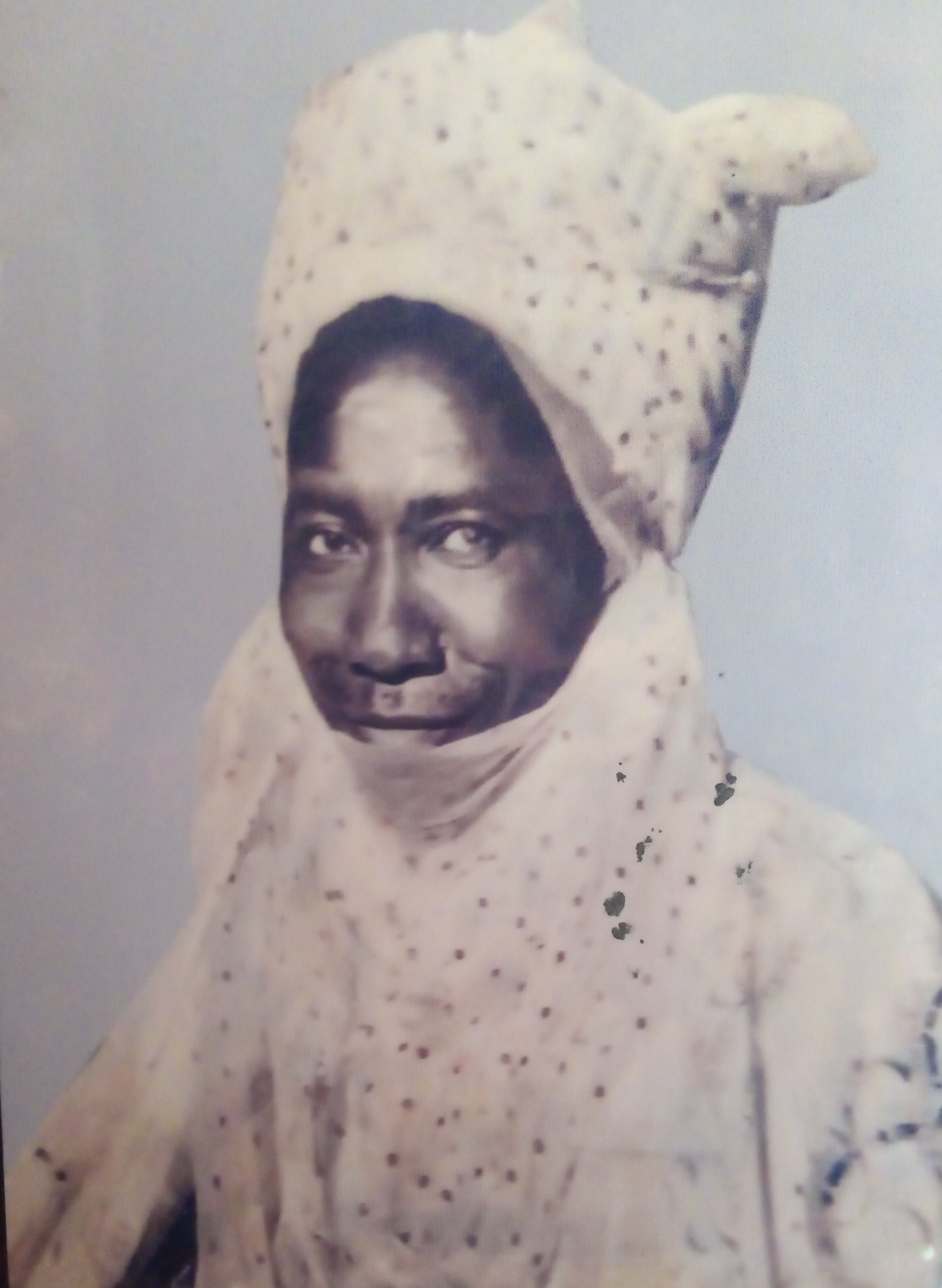
- Undated photograph

Emir of Kano
- Reign: December 1953 – April 1963
- Predecessor: Abdullahi Bayero
- Abdicated: Muhammad Inuwa

Chiroma of Kano
- In office 1926 – 23 December 1953
- Monarch: Abdullahi Bayero
- Preceded by: Abdullahi Bayero
- Succeeded by: Aminu Sanusi
- Born: 1900; Kano
- Died: 1991 (aged 90–91); Wudil, Kano State
- Burial: Nassarawa Palace, Kano State, Nigeria
- Issue: Ado Sanusi
- Dynasty: Dabo (House of Bayero)
- Father: Abdullahi Bayero
- Religion: Islam

Alhaji Sir Muhammadu Sanusi I KBE was the Emir of Kano from 1954 to 1963, and Acting Governor of Northern Nigeria (1957). He was the eldest son of Emir Abdullahi Bayero. He was a powerful Emir that had substantial influence in the colonial Northern Nigeria. He hosted a grand durbar festival for Elizabeth II when she visited Kano in 1956. The power tussle between him and his distant cousin Sir Ahmadu Bello the Sardauna of Sokoto and accusations of financial malfeasance led to his abdication, and subsequent self-exile in Azare 1963. He was afterwards returned to Wudil town of Kano State, where he spent the rest of his life. It was shortly after his abdication from Emirship that he was appointed as the Caliph of Tijaniyya Sufi Order in Nigeria. It is noteworthy that his grandson, Sanusi Lamido Sanusi, former Governor of the Central Bank of Nigeria reigned as Emir of Kano from 2014 to 2020, was also dethroned by the state government in 2020 then, unlike in his grandfather's case, reinstated as Emir on 24 May 2024 by Governor Abba Kabir Yusuf. Sanusi belonged to the reformed Tijaniyya order of Ibrahim Niass.

== Life ==
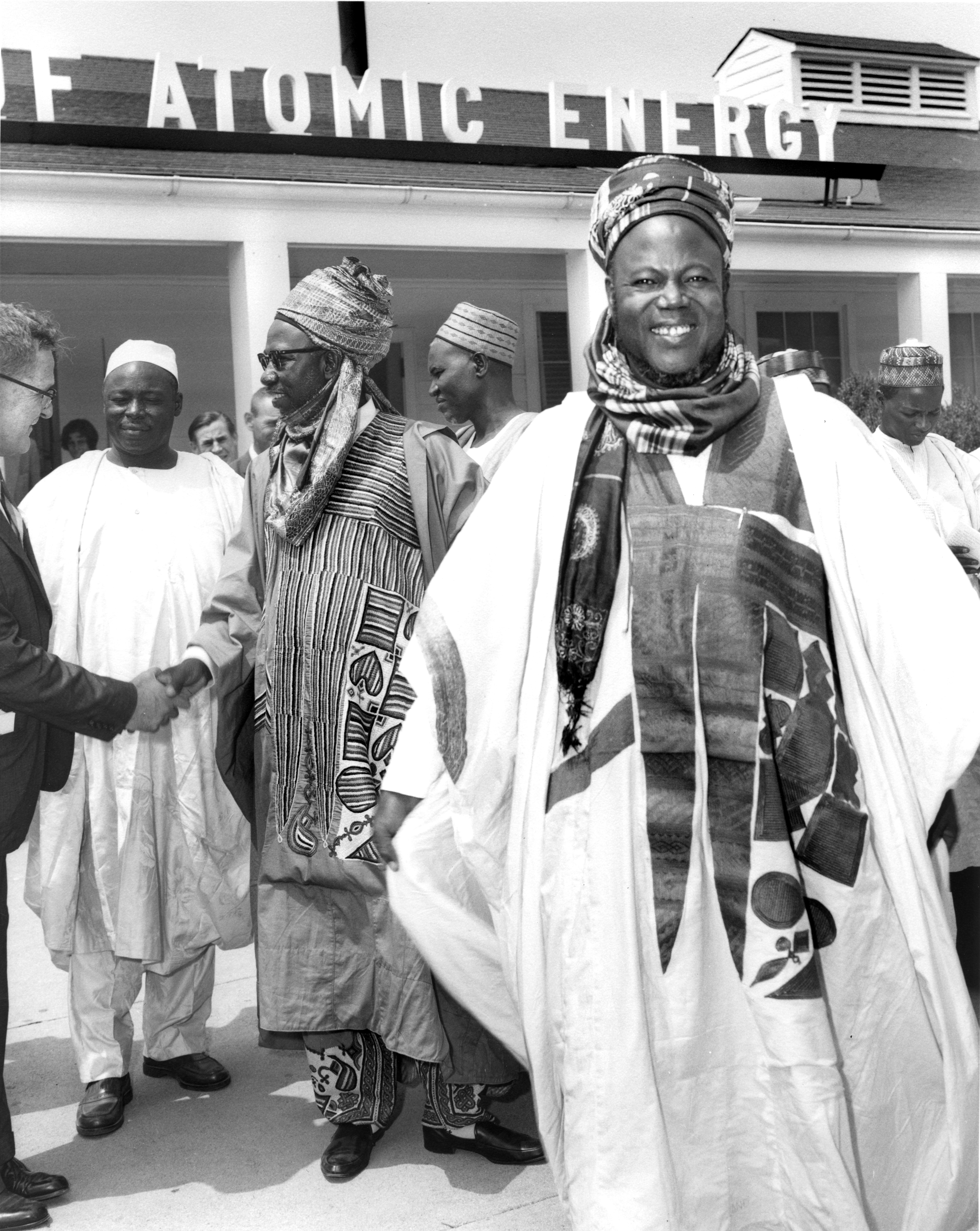
Ahmadu Bello, Premier of the Northern Region of Nigeria with Emir of Kano Muhammadu Sanusi I, 1960 Oak Ridge

Sanusi was born to the large family of Abdullahi Bayero, Emir of Kano, among his brothers was future Emir, Ado Bayero. He was the second son of Bayero but his elder brother died at an early age. He was educated at Kano Middle School. Prior to becoming Emir, Sanusi held the title of Ciroma Kano and in 1947, he became a member of the regional House of Assembly. Sanusi was closely affiliated with Ibrahim Niass and the Tijani Sufi, for a while, he accompanied Niass on pilgrimages to Mecca and was later the appointed Caliph of the tijaniyyah order in Nigeria. He was also appointed a minister without portfolio in 1958 alongside other emirs like Usman Nagogo. In his memoir 'An Imperial Twilight', Sir Gawain Bell narrates how he appointed Emir Sanusi to act in his stead as Governor of Northern Nigeria for six months in 1957.

== Knighthood ==
- Knighted into the Order of the British Empire as a Knight Commander (K.B.E.)

== Sources ==
- Paden, John N. (1973). Religion and political culture in Kano. Berkeley: University of California Press. ISBN 978-0-520-01738-2.
