= Ado Bayero =

- Sarkin Kano
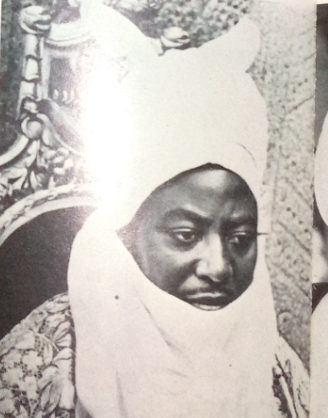
- Late Emir of Kano at early age.

Emir of Kano
- Reign: 22 October 1963 – 6 June 2014
- Coronation: 27 February 1964
- Predecessor: Muhammad Inuwa
- Successor: Muhammadu Sanusi II
- Heir presumptive: Sanusi Ado Bayero
- Born: 25 July 1930: Kano, Kano Province, Northern Region, British Nigeria
- Died: 6 June 2014 (aged 83); Kano, Kano State, Nigeria
- Issue: Sanusi Ado Bayero; Aminu Ado Bayero; Nasiru Ado Bayero; several others
Names
- Ado Abdullahi Bayero
- Dynasty: Dabo
- Father: Abdullahi Bayero
- Mother: Hajiya Hasiyatu (Mai Babban Daki)

Nigeria's Ambassador to Senegal
- In office 1962 – October 1963
- Prime Minister: Abubakar Tafawa Balewa
- Preceded by: position established
- Succeeded by: Sani Kontagora

Ado Bayero CFR, LLD, JP (25 July 1930 – 6 June 2014) was the Emir of Kano from 1963 to 2014.

== Early life ==
=== Lineage ===
Ado Bayero was born on 25 July 1930 into the royal family of the Fulani Sullubawa clan that has ruled over the Emirate of Kano since 1819. His father was Abdullahi Bayero and his mother was Hajiya Hasiya. He was the eleventh child of his father and the second of his mother. At the age of seven, he was sent to live with Maikano Zagi. His father reigned for 27 years. Muhammadu Sanusi I who was Ado Bayero's half brother ruled after their father from 1953 to 1963. Following his dethronement in 1963, Muhammadu Inuwa ascended the throne for three months.

=== Early life and education ===
Bayero started his education in Kano studying Islam, after which he attended Kano Middle School (now Rumfa College, Kano). He spent around three years at the Kano School for Arabic Studies but did not complete the course. He then worked as a bank clerk for the Bank of British West Africa until 1949, when he joined the Kano Native Authority. He attended Zaria Clerical College in 1952.

In 1956, he contested and won the regional election in Kano city as a member of the Northern People's Congress (NPC). However, he only spent about a year as a member of the Northern House of Assembly as he was pressured to resign his position, partly due to his 'modern views'.

Shortly after his resignation, he was appointed chief of the Kano Native Authority Police. During which he tried to minimize the practice of briefly detaining individuals and political opponents on the orders of powerful individuals in Kano. In late 1962, he was appointed Nigeria's Ambassador to Senegal, a position he held until his appointment as emir.

== Reign ==
=== Accession ===
After the death of Emir Muhammadu Inuwa who ruled for only three months, Ado Bayero was crowned the Emir of Kano on October 22, 1963, becoming the 13th Fulani Emir of Kano and the 56th ruler of Kano.

=== 1960s ===
Bayero became emir during the first republic, at a time when Nigeria was going through rapid social and political changes and regional, sub-regional and ethnic discord was increasing. In his first few years, two pro-Kano political movements gained support among some Kano elites. The Kano People's Party emerged during the reign of Muhammadu Inuwa and supported the deposed Emir Sanusi, but it soon evaporated. The Kano State Movement emerged towards the end of 1965 and favored more economic autonomy for the province.

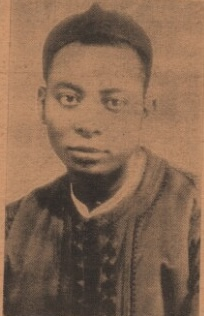
A portrait of Ado Bayero published in an issue of Gaskiya Ta Fi Kwabo in October 1956

The death in 1966 of many political agitators from northern Nigeria, and the subsequent establishment of a unitary state, consolidated a united front in the northern region but also resulted in a spate of violence there, including in Kano. Bayero's admirers credit him with bringing calm and stability during this and later crises in Kano.

=== 1970s ===
The constitutional powers of the emir were whittled down by the military regimes between 1966 and 1979. The Native Authority Police and Prisons Department was abolished, the emir's judicial council was superseded by another body, and local government reforms in 1968, 1972, and 1976 reduced the powers of the emir.

=== 1980s ===
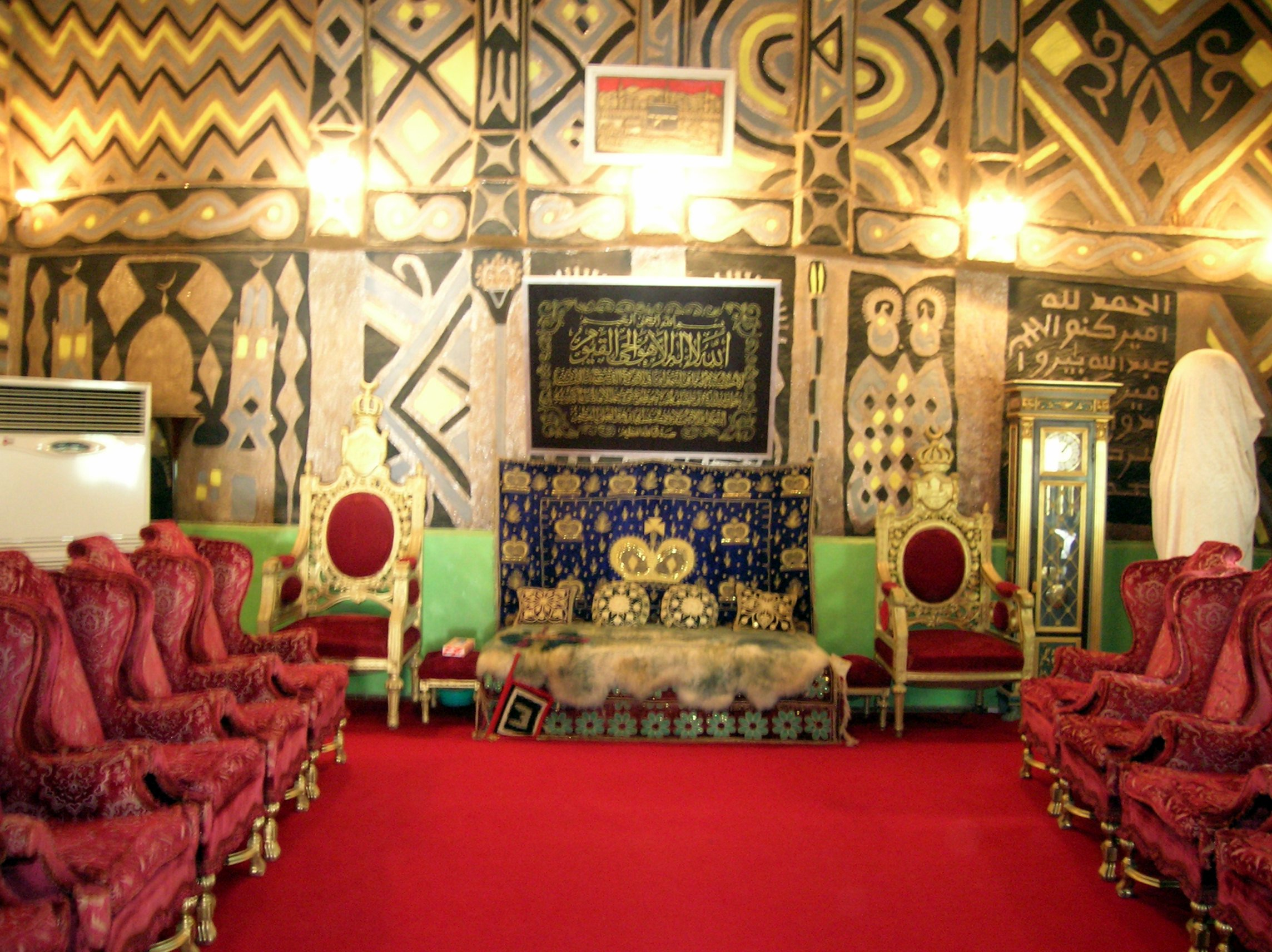
Inside the Emir's reception room

During the second republic, he witnessed hostilities from the People's Redemption Party led government of Abubakar Rimi. Bayero's Palace plays host to official visits by many government personnel and foreigners, but in 1981 Governor Abubakar Rimi restricted traditional homage paid by village heads to Ado Bayero and excised some domains from his emirate.

In 1984, a travel ban was placed on the emir and his friend Okunade Sijuwade. Although the military regimes were then seen as relying on traditional rulers for support, many military regimes in the past reduced the powers of traditional rulers such as Bayero.

=== Later years ===
As emir, he became a patron of Islamic scholarship and embraced Western education as a means to succeed in a modern Nigeria. He was a vocal critic of the terrorist group Boko Haram and strongly opposed their campaign against western education. On 19 January 2013, he survived an assassination attempt blamed on the Islamist group which left two of his sons injured and his driver and bodyguard dead, among others. A prime suspect confessed to have participated in the attack on the Emir's motorcade and so many other co-ordinated attacks in the state which led to the arrest of six others.

== Death and succession ==
On 6 June 2014, after fifty-one years on the throne, Ado Bayero died in his palace Gidan Rumfa. A bitter succession struggle over who'd succeed him emerged within the royal family between the Bayero and Sanusi houses. His eldest son and heir, Sanusi Ado Bayero was considered the natural successor and initial reports announced him as Emir. On 8 June 2014, his grand nephew Sanusi Lamido Sanusi was crowned Emir of Kano. His son, Sanusi Ado in protest decided to leave Kano and in 2015, he was stripped of all his titles, after refusing to pay allegiance to Emir Sanusi Lamido Sanusi.

== Legacy ==
Bayero was the longest-serving emir in Kano's history. He was seen as one of Nigeria's most prominent and revered Muslim leaders who was a successful businessman and had worked as a banker, police officer, MP and diplomat. Ado Bayero was the 13th Fulani Emir since the Fulani War of Usman dan Fodio, when the Fulani took over the Hausa city-states. He was one of the strongest and most powerful emirs in the history of the Hausa land. He was renowned for his abundant wealth, maintained by means of stock market investments and large-scale agricultural entrepreneurship both at home and abroad.

Ado Bayero House of Dabo Born: 25 July 1930 Died: 6 June 2014
Regnal titles
Preceded by Muhammadu Inuwa	Emir of Kano; 1963–2014	Succeeded by Muhammadu Sanusi II
