= Emir of Kano =

Nigerian monarchy

Incumbent
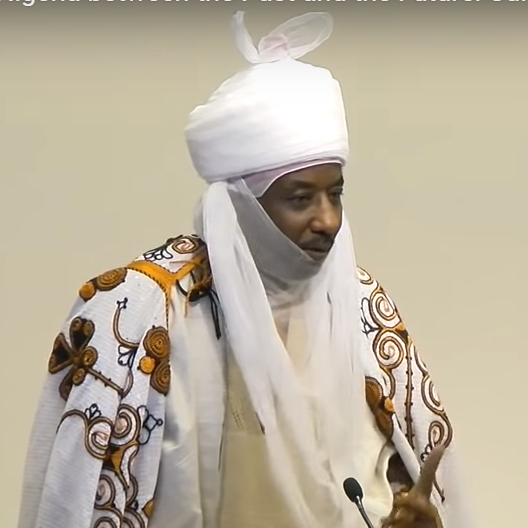
- Muhammadu Sanusi II since 23 May 2024

Details
- Style: His Majesty
- First monarch: Bagauda
- Formation: 999 A.D
- Residences: Gidan Rumfa
- Website: kanoemirate.org

The Emir of Kano is the title of the traditional ruler of the Kano Emirate, a historic Islamic emirate in the ancient city of Kano, Kano State, Nigeria. Historically regarded as the second most important Muslim traditional position in Nigeria after the Sultan of Sokoto, the Emirate has evolved from an early Hausa kingdom into a Fulani-ruled emirate under the Sokoto Caliphate, and finally into a traditional institution within Nigeria's modern federal and state government structure.

As of 2026, the emirship is currently the subject of an unresolved legal and political dispute between two rival claimants, Muhammadu Sanusi II and Aminu Ado Bayero, with the matter being moved to 2027 by the Supreme Court in Nigeria.

== Origin: the Hausa kingdom of Kano ==
Kano's ruling dynasty traces back many centuries before the arrival of Islam in the region, with the city-state's early history recorded in oral tradition and later compiled in the Kano Chronicle, a foundational historical text for the region. Kano developed as one of the principal Hausa city-states (Hausa Bakwai), and its rulers bore the Hausa title Sarki prior to the 19th-century transformation of the kingdom under Fulani rule.

== The Fulani Jihad and the founding of the Emirate ==
The modern Emirate of Kano was established in the early 19th century in the wake of the Fulani jihad led by Usman dan Fodio. This jihad overthrew the existing Hausa ruling dynasties across much of what is now northern Nigeria and then established the Sokoto Caliphate. Suleiman became the first Fulani Emir of Kano in 1805 and ruled until 1819. In September 1819, Ibrahim Dabo was appointed Emir of Kano by Muhammad Bello, the second Caliph of Sokoto. He founded the Dabo dynasty that has supplied the great majority of Kano's emirs since. Dabo's policy was focused on centralizing the Emirate's administration, with focus on reviving old royal titles to consolidate power He also focused on establishing ribats (fortified settlements) such as Fanisau.

The British conquest of 1903 ended the Dabo dynasty which ruled Kano independently, as a component state of the Sokoto Caliphate.

== Colonial transformation ==
In February 1903, British colonial forces under Colonel Thomas Morland attacked and captured Kano during the broader British conquest of the Sokoto Caliphate. This became known as the Battle of Kano. Reigning Emir Aliyu Babba (the 7th Emir of Kano), was away in Sokoto at the time of the invasion, where he was captured. He was exiled to Lokoja, where he died in 1926. Muhammad Abbas was installed as Emir in May 1903 by the British. The emirate was restructured as the Kano Emirate Council, a traditional institution operating under indirect colonial rule. This new structure made the Emirate lose its former sovereign political and military authority; although it retained substantial customary, religious, and local administrative functions.

== Role in the 20th century ==
All through the mid-20th century, the Emirate continued as a major traditional and religious institution in Northern Nigeria. Abdullahi Bayero reigned as the 10th Emir of Kano from 1926 until his death in 1953. He was succeeded by Muhammadu Sanusi I who was dethroned and banished to Azare (in present-day Bauchi State) in 1963 by Sir Ahmadu Bello, then Premier of Nigeria's Northern Region. This was the first instance of the political authorities of the day directly removing a sitting Emir. He was succeeded by Muhammadu Inuwa, who had previously held the senior palace title of Galadima. He ruled from April 1963 until his death in October of the same year.

in 1963, after the reign of Muhammadu Inuwa, Ado Bayero became Emir and reigned for approximately fifty years until his death in 2014. He presided over the Emirate's transition into Nigeria's post-independence and post-1999 federal democratic system, under which state governors formally hold the power to appoint and remove emirs.

== Selection and installation ==
The position for the Emir draws candidates from recognized ruling houses within the Dabo dynasty, with senior royal titles; most notably Galadima and Ciroma. The Galadima is traditionally the highest palace rank a prince can hold before ascending the throne and Ciroma is the heir apparent. Several 19th- and 20th-century emirs, including the dynasty's founder Ibrahim Dabo, held the Galadima title before their accession to the throne.

In present day Nigeria, the formal power to appoint and dethrone the Emir of Kano rests with the Kano State Governor and the Kano State House of Assembly, acting through state emirate legislation, unlike in the past where it is through an independent hereditary or clerical process alone. This power has made the emirship highly sensitive to Kano's state-level politics, and successive governors have used their statutory authority to depose and reinstate emirs, most visibly in the disputes of 2020 and 2024 - the case between Emir Sanusi II and Emir Bayero.

=== The 2014-2026 succession dispute ===
Sanusi Lamido Sanusi, a former Governor of the Central Bank of Nigeria, succeeded his great-uncle Ado Bayero as Emir in June 2014. He became the 14th Emir of Kano, taking the regnal name of Muhammadu Sanusi II.

In May 2019, then-Governor Abdullahi Umar Ganduje signed the Kano State Emirate Council Law 2019. This law split the historic Kano Emirate into five separate emirates. In March 2020, Ganduje's government dethroned Sanusi II and installed Aminu Ado Bayero as the 15th Emir of Kano. Emir Bayero is a son of the former Emir Ado Bayero. Aminu Ado Bayero received his staff of office on 3 July 2021.

Governor Abba Kabir Yusuf was elected as governor of Kano State in 2023. In 2024, the Kano state House of Assembly passed the Kano State Emirates Council Amendment Bill, abolishing four newly created emirates in the state, thus reversing the 2019 restructuring, dissolving the five newly created emirates (Bichi, Karaye, Gaya, and Rano, among them) and restoring the Emirate's original boundaries. On 23 May 2024, Muhammadu Sanusi II was reinstated as the 16th Emir of Kano by Governor Yusuf under the restored, unified Emirate. Aminu Ado Bayero has continued to dispute his removal, refusing to acknowledge the reinstatement and continuing to occupy a palace within the Emirate.

The dispute has since proceeded through Nigeria's courts. As of mid-2026, former Governor Ganduje has stated that the "subsisting legal position" recognizes Aminu Ado Bayero as the 15th Emir and Sanusi II as the 14th Emir pending a final Supreme Court ruling, which he indicated was expected in 2027. In the meantime, the Kano State Government under Governor Yusuf has continued to recognize and publicly support Sanusi II, including approving him to lead official state ceremonial functions such as the 2026 Eid-el-Fitr Durbar.

== List of selected Emirs of Kano (Fulani dynasty, from 1805) ==
- Suleiman (r. 1805–1819) — first Fulani Emir of Kano following the jihad.
- Ibrahim Dabo (r. 1819–1846) — founder of the Dabo dynasty; centralized the Emirate's administration.
- Muhammad Bello — 19th-century Emir; father of Muhammad Tukur.
- Muhammad Tukur (r. 1893–1894) — presided over the Emirate during the Basasa, a Kano civil war involving multiple claimants to the throne.
- Aliyu Babba (r. 1894–1903) — last independent Emir before the British conquest; exiled to Lokoja after 1903.
- Muhammad Abbas (r. 1903–1919) — installed by the British after the Battle of Kano; first Emir under colonial rule.
- Abdullahi Bayero (r. 1926–1953) — 10th Emir; served previously as Waziri and Chiroma of Kano.
- Muhammadu Sanusi I (r. 1953–1963) — dethroned and exiled by the Northern Region's Premier, Sir Ahmadu Bello.
- Muhammadu Inuwa (r. 1963) — briefly succeeded Sanusi I; previously held the Galadima title.
- Ado Bayero (r. 1963–2014) — longest-reigning modern Emir, at approximately fifty years.
- Muhammadu Sanusi II (Sanusi Lamido Sanusi; 1st reign 2014–2020, 2nd reign 2024–present) — 14th/16th Emir depending on the source consulted; former Central Bank Governor; dethroned in 2020 and reinstated in 2024; disputed as of 2026.
- Aminu Ado Bayero (r. 2020–2024, disputed claimant since) — 15th Emir; installed after Sanusi II's 2020 dethronement; has not recognized his own 2024 removal
- Muhammadu Sanusi II (r. 2024-present) - 16th Emir

== Cultural and religious significance ==
The Kano emirship remains one of the most prominent traditional and religious institutions in Northern Nigeria beyond its governmental role. The Emir of Kano presides over major cultural events such as the Hawan Sallah processions marking the Islamic festivals of Eid al-Fitr and Eid al-Adha. The position continues to carry great deal of religious authority within Kano's Muslim population. The current dispute between Emir Sanusi and Adamu Ado Bayero over the emirship has generated significant public attention in Nigeria; this being that the emirship's is the second-ranking traditional Muslim office in the country after the Sultanate of Sokoto.

== See also ==
- Kano Emirate
- Hausa Kingdoms
- Kano Emirate Council
- Sokoto Caliphate
- Sultan of Sokoto
- Hausa Bakwai
- Kano Chronicle
- Nigerian traditional rulers
- List of rulers of Kano
- Timeline of Kano
