= Taran Kano =

Council of state in the Kano Kingdom and the Kano Emirate

The Tara-ta-Kano or Taran Kano (lit. 'The Kano Nine') was the state council of the Kano Kingdom and, later, the Kano Emirate. Established in the 15th century by Sarkin Kano Muhammadu Rumfa, the council advised the sarki on matters of state, including administration, foreign relations, trade, defence, law, and the management of relations with major local chiefdoms. In practice, the council served as a check on the power of individual titleholders, including the sarki himself, as no single official held paramount authority within it. This cabinet was modelled on the Council of Twelve that governed the Kanem-Bornu Empire, Kano's suzerain during the 15th century.

Under Hausa rule, the council was traditionally divided into three sub-groups. The first, said to be "greater than the sarki", comprised the Galadima, the Madaki, and the Wambai. The second, considered "equal to the sarki", consisted of the Makama, the Sarkin Dawaki, and the Sarkin Bai. The third, which was "less than the sarki", was made up of the Ciroma, the Dan Iya, and the Sarkin Dawaki Tsakar Gida.

According to Kano constitutional doctrine, a sarki was not to overrule the joint advice of the four senior non-royal councillors, the Madaki, the Makama, the Sarkin Bai, and the Wambai, and failure to observe this would lead to his deposition by the same. On the death of a sarki, four or five members of the state council constituted themselves as an electoral council to select his successor: the Madaki, the Makama (when not a prince), the Sarkin Bai, the Dan Iya, and the Sarkin Dawaki Tsakar Gida. During their deliberations, the limam of Kano served as head of state.

== See also ==
- Kano Emirate Council
- Sarauta
