= Tukur (name) =

Tukur can be a masculine given name, a middle name, or a surname. Notable people with the name include:

== Given name ==
- Tukur Bala, Nigerian politician
- Tukur Yusufu Buratai, Nigerian lieutenant general
- Tukur Jekada, Nigerian politician
- Tukur Idris Nadabo, Nigerian politician

== Middle name ==
- Muhammad Tukur Bature, Nigerian politician
- Mohammed Tukur Liman, Nigerian politician
- Mohammed Tukur Usman, Nigerian official
- Musa Tukur Yakasai, vice-chancellor of Aliko Dangote University of Science and Technology

== Surname ==
- Abdullahi Liman Tukur, former vice-chancellor of Modibbo Adama University, Yola
- Abdulra'uf Tukur, Nigerian politician
- Amiruddin Tukur, Nigerian politician
- Awwal Tukur, Nigerian politician and lawyer
- Bamanga Tukur (1935–2026), Nigerian politician
- Bello Mohammed Tukur, Nigerian politician
- Emre Tukur (1968/1969–2025), keyboardist for Turkish band Klips ve Onlar
- Halima Hassan Tukur, Nigerian politician
- Mahmud Tukur (1939–2021), Nigerian politician
- Mahmud Modibbo Tukur, Nigerian historian and scholar
- Mohammed Tukur (r. 1893–1894), emir of Kano
- Ulrich Tukur, German actor and musician
