= Maryam bint Uthman =

Fulani Islamic scholar (1810–c. 1880s)

- Title: Uwardeji

Personal life
- Born: 1810 likely at Sifawa, Sokoto Caliphate (today in Sokoto State, Nigeria)
- Died: after 1885 Sokoto, Sokoto Caliphate
- Resting place: Hubbare, Sokoto, Sokoto State
- Spouse: Muhammad Ade Ibrahim Dabo (died 1846)
- Parents: Usman dan Fodio (father); Mariya (mother)
- Main interest(s): Islamic poetry, women's education, Islamic eschatology

Religious life
- Religion: Islam
- Denomination: Sunni
- Jurisprudence: Maliki
- Tariqa: Qadiriyyah
- Creed: Ash'ari

Muslim leader
- Teacher: Usman dan Fodio, Nana Asma'u

Maryam bint al-Shaikh Uthman bin Fudi (born 1810 – died c.1880s), also known by her title Uwardeji, was a scholar, teacher and influential figure in the Sokoto Caliphate. The youngest daughter of the Caliphate's founder, Usman dan Fodio, she was known for her learning and for her role in political and religious life in both Sokoto and Kano. She studied under her father and her sister Nana Asma'u, later becoming active in Asma'u's Yan Taru women's education movement, which she later led. Through her marriages, including to Emir of Kano Ibrahim Dabo, Maryam became connected to leading families of the Caliphate and played a mediating role in Kano–Sokoto relations. She was also regarded as an authority on Islamic eschatology, particularly debates surrounding the Mahdi in the late 19th century.

== Life ==
=== Early life ===
Maryam was born in 1810, likely at Sifawa (today in Sokoto State, Nigeria). She was the youngest daughter of Usman dan Fodio, the Fulani Islamic scholar who established the Sokoto Caliphate. Starting in 1804, he led a reformist jihad which eventually ended in 1808, two years before Maryam's birth. Not much is known about her mother Mariya, who was Usman's only concubine.

Maryam's family was well known for its learning. She studied under her father and her half-sister Nana Asma'u, who was also a respected scholar and poet.

Around the time of Maryam's birth, Asma'u married the waziri (grand vizier) of the Caliphate, Gidado dan Laima. Maryam later married Gidado's son from his first wife, Muhammad Ade. From this marriage, she had two children, including a daughter named Ta Modi (whose name was also Maryam). She later married Ibrahim Dabo, Emir of Kano (r. 1818–1846), after which she moved to the Kano palace, where she started a Qur'anic school. Following Dabo's death in 1846, she is said to have remarried Ade.

=== Caliphal affairs ===
Maryam was not Dabo's first wife, nor was the dynasty descended from her. Nevertheless, she became influential in Kano affairs. Hence, when her husband died, and she returned to Sokoto, the caliphs sought her advice on relations with the important emirate of Kano. When Caliph Ahmadu Rufa'i planned on deposing Emir Abdullahi, Dabo's son, the emir appealed to her in dissuading the caliph. Abdullahi even threatened to revolt, but Rufa'i eventually agreed to allow him to remain in power.

After the death of Emir Abdullahi in 1882, Caliph Umaru and his waziri, Abdullahi Bayero, were unable to decide on who should succeed between Dan Lawan Yusufu and Abdullahi's brother Yusufu, who had been dismissed as Galadima. Both the caliph and waziri had favourites and were opposed to the other's candidate. To resolve the deadlock, Maryam suggested Mamman Bello, Dabo's son and Abdullahi's younger brother. Both Umaru and Bayero were said to have been relieved, and approved Bello's appointment as Emir of Kano.

Formerly I knew it not: a saintly woman has made it clear to me, this fear [of the decline all around], Maryam saw and gave heed... Thank you, Maryam, you reminded me, and I pondered; at first I was among the forgetful.

— Muhammadu Buhari b. Ahmadu, the Waziri of Sokoto at the time of the British occupation of Sokoto in 1903,

Maryam was regarded as an authority on the coming of the Mahdi in Sokoto. Her knowledge on the subject became highly important when the Sudanese Mahdi, Muhammad Ahmad, was proclaimed in 1881. This led to widespread emigration from the Caliphate to the east, including the Sokoto prince Hayatu bin Sa'id who wrote to her urging her to also emigrate. Concerned about the wave of emigrants from Kano, Emir Bello wrote to Maryam, seeking her advice about the time of the manifestation of the Mahdi. In her letter, Wathiqa ila amir Kanu fi amr al-mahdi, she said:

As for the question about which you have sought our opinion, namely that the people of Hausaland pass by your place from all directions and claim among other things that the time for the evacuation of Hausaland has come, the answer is as follows: such people are utterly misguided and completely ignorant of their religion and worldly affairs.

=== Yan Taru movement and death ===
Maryam was active in Nana Asma'u's Yan Taru, a movement to educate women in the Caliphate. Asma'u led her group of disciples (jajis) to disseminate "Sufi teachings about spirituality, ethics, and morality in the handling of social responsibilities seeped down to the lowest strata of the communal fabric". After Asma'u's death in 1864, Maryam took over as head of the movement and adopted the title Uwardeji. The title meant "custodian of royal children", and was used as an epithet for the important Gobir title Inna. At her home in Hubbare, her father's old house and now tomb, women from various villages gathered and received both moral and academic instruction from her, as they had from Asma'u. Other activities included singing special songs, camping outside, and visiting revered shrines.

Maryam died in the 1880s. Afterwards, her daughter Ta Modi took over as head of the Yan Taru movement, which is still active today.
