= Galadima =

Historical title for a high-ranking Sudanese official or nobleman

Galadima is a historical title that referred to a high-ranking official or nobleman within various states of the historical central Sudan region, including the Hausa Kingdoms, Kanem-Bornu, and the Sokoto Caliphate. The title was typically held by individuals responsible for overseeing administrative, military, or diplomatic affairs. Although the exact roles and responsibilities of the Galadima varied across different polities, it was consistently associated with influential and authoritative figures. Today, the title exists as an honorific in most states in Northern Nigeria.

== Origin ==
The title's original meaning is 'Governor of Galadi (i.e. the western territories of Kanem-Bornu)'.

== Kanem-Bornu ==
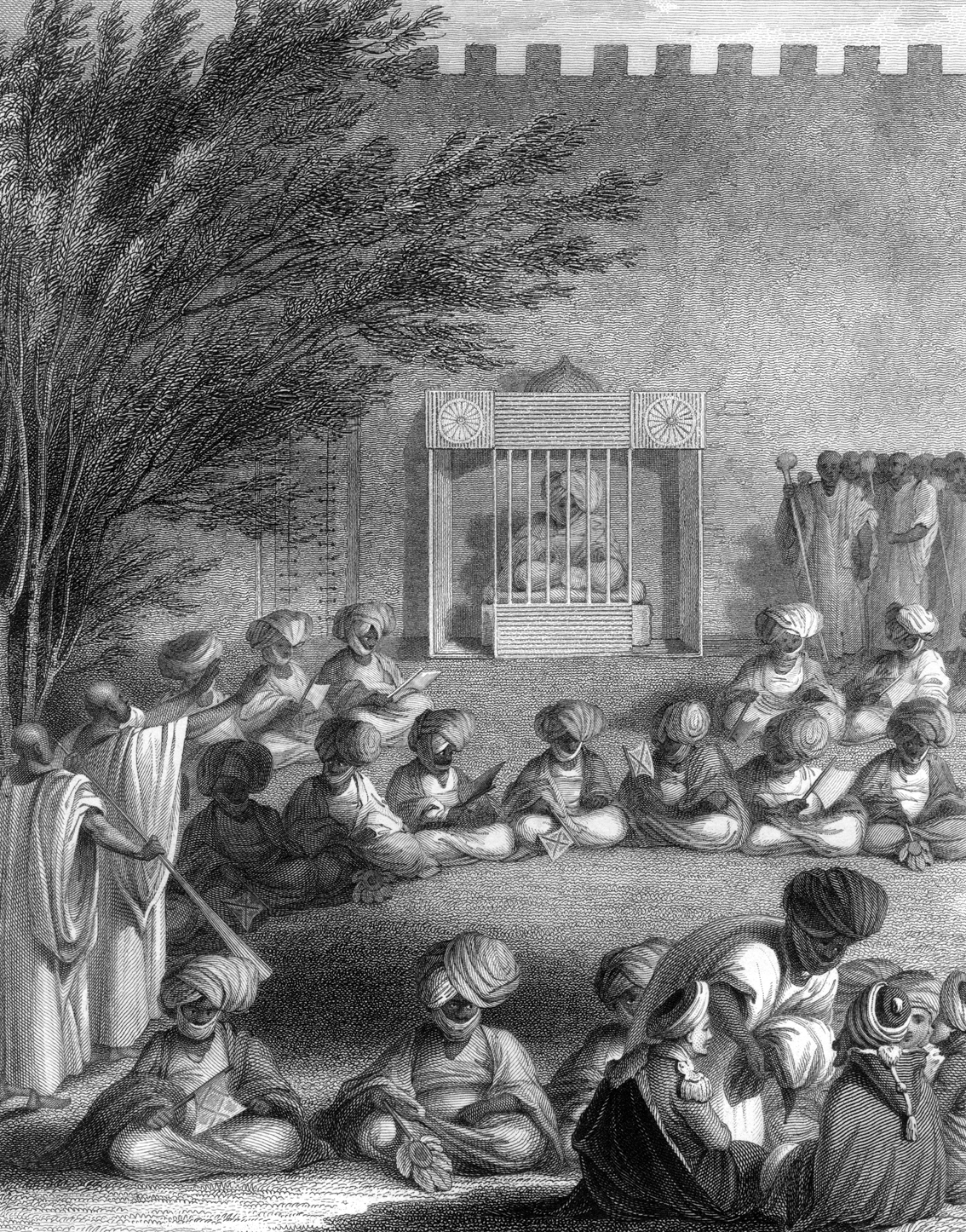
Courtiers of the Mai of Bornu (1826)

The Galadima in Kanem-Bornu held a powerful position before the 19th-century. Operating from Nguru, the officer acted as an independent vassal of the Mai ('ruler') and was responsible for the western marches of the empire. The Galadima was the only high-ranking courtier of the Mai permitted to reside outside the empire's capital, Birni Gazargamu. The title was hereditary, although there is some evidence suggesting that the Mai occasionally selected a successor.

The available evidence suggests that the title originated in the 1600s. According to a chronicle found in Bornu, the first Galadima was the son of a Bornu Mai by a slave mother. Ashamed to acknowledge his son, the Mai sent the mother and child to the house of the Makinta, a palace slave, where the boy was raised. When he reached maturity, his father accepted him and granted him the 'west' as a fief.

By the late 18th-century, the Galadima was responsible for overseeing the easternmost areas of Hausaland, including Shira, Teshena, Hadejia, and Auyo. When the Sokoto jihad erupted in Bornu in the early 1800s, it began in the Fulani settlements under the administration of the Galadima, Dunama. In 1807, after several successive defeats, Dunama was eventually killed by the Fulani jihadists, who went on to establish emirates, such as Katagum, Misau, Hadejia, and Jemaare, from portions of the region he had previously administered.

The successors of Dunama were in constant conflict with the Mais and the Shehu, Muhammad al-Kanemi, resulting in the execution of one and the flight of another. Finally, a successor named Umar decided to cooperate with the Bornu leadership. In 1828, after the ruler of Gumel was deposed by the Shehu, he was delivered to the Galadima for safekeeping.

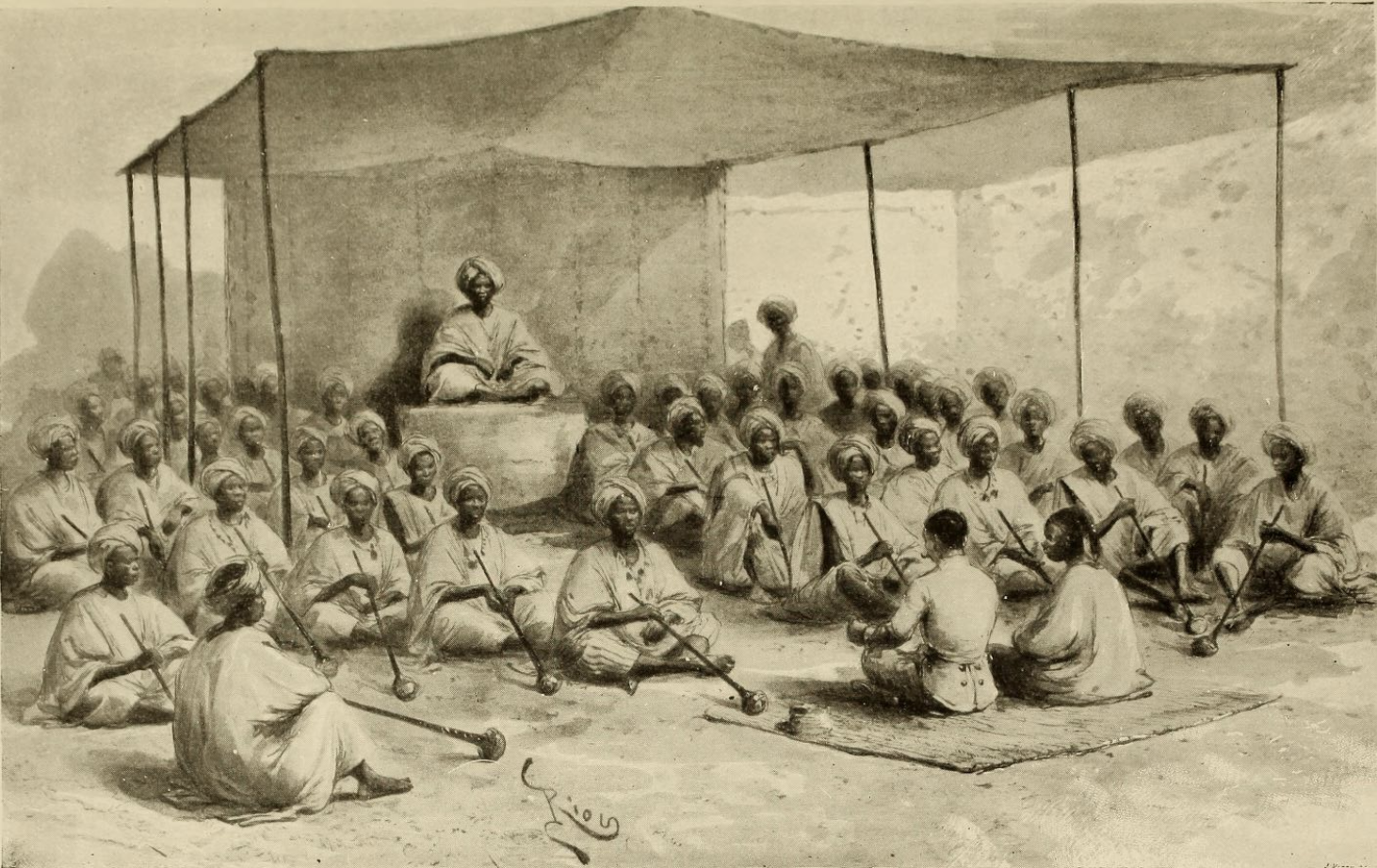
The Galadima of Bornu receives Parfait-Louis Monteil (1891)

Although Gumel had fallen under the Galadima's jurisdiction before the jihad years, Umar had not exercised any real authority over the settlement for years. When the Shehu decided to administer Gumel directly, an angry Umar killed the deposed ruler placed under his protection. Consequently, al-Kanemi sent a military campaign against the Galadima, who fortified himself in Wari. Although the Galadima mounted a fierce defense, the siege was ultimately successful. Galadima Umar managed to escape to Sokoto, where he remained for over a year. After making amends with the Shehu, he returned to Bornu to resume his post. He established himself at Bundi (today in Nguru, Yobe State) in western Bornu, but his power had 'sunk to great insignificance', according to Dr Heinrich Barth, a German explorer who visited the kingdom in the 1850s.

Under Colonial Nigeria, the Galadima was the only office-holder from pre-colonial Bornu to be recognised by the government. He held an influential position in the Native Administration and served as the District Head of Nguru.

In modern Nigeria, the position is largely ceremonial. The Galadima is a member of the Borno Emirate Council, an advisory board composed of traditional title holders who assist the Borno State Government in the cultural preservation of the emirate. The title is usually given to notable individuals from Borno State by the Shehu of Borno.

== Hausaland ==
The Galadima title was imported from Bornu during the period where the empire had extended its influence across most of the Hausa Kingdoms in the 16th-century.

In many of the Hausa states, the office of Galadima acted as a sort of vizier, and was sometimes assigned to the heir apparent.

=== Kano ===
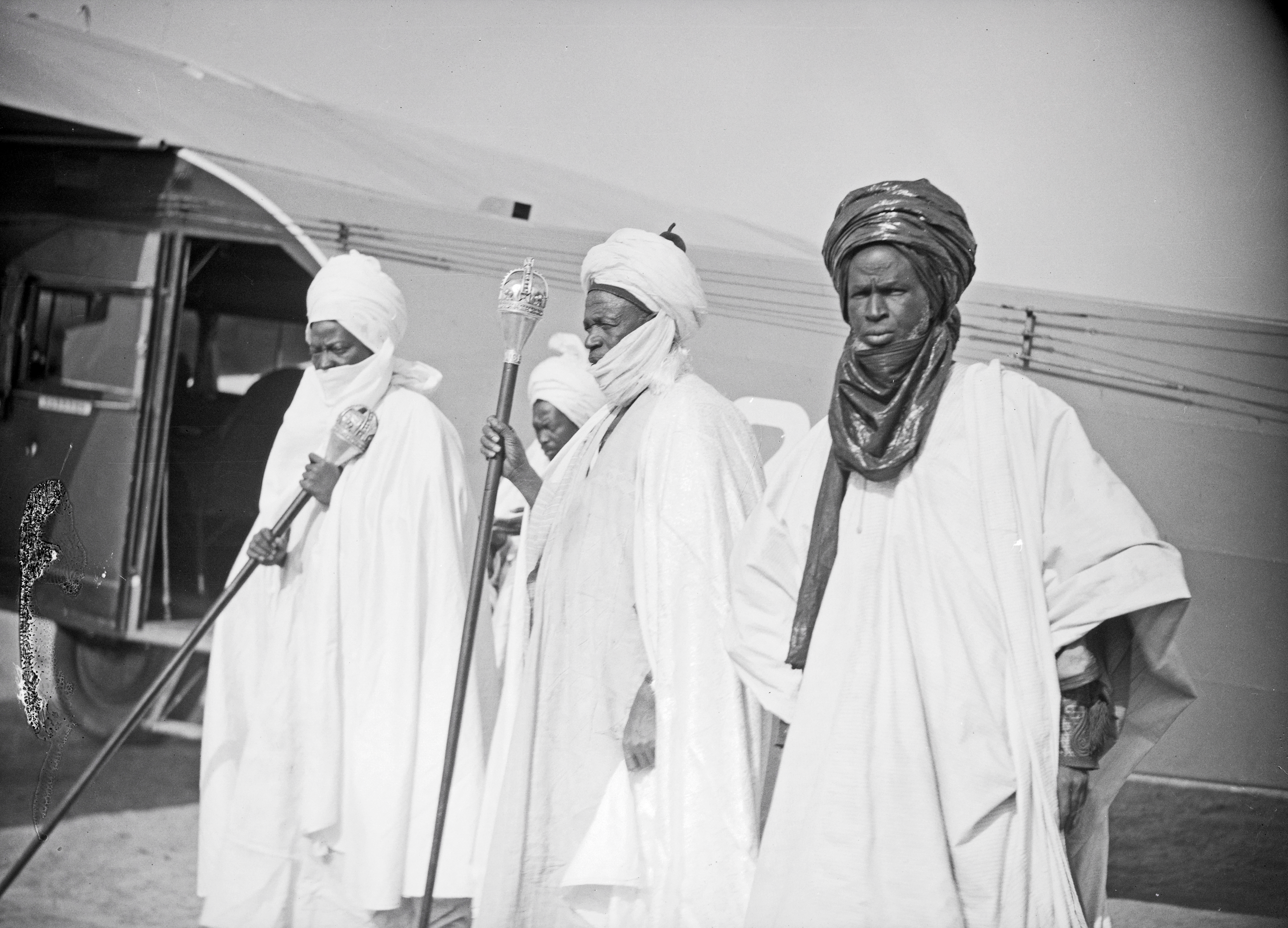
Emir Abdullahi Bayero (r. 1926–1953) with some of his councillors

While the Galadima title is generally believed to have originated in Bornu during the 16th century, the Kano Chronicle suggests a different origin. According to the Chronicle, the title was introduced in Kano in the late 11th century by Warisi, the second Sarkin Kano.

The earliest notable Galadima was Daudu, who served under the 17th Sarkin Kano, Abdullahi Burja. He frequently led slave raids to the south of Kano, reportedly sending a thousand slaves to the sultan each month. After seven years of raiding, Sultan Abdullahi summoned him back to Kano. Along the journey, Daudu was said to have stopped every three miles to build a town. By the time he reached the kingdom's capital, he had founded twenty-one towns. The Sultan appointed him as the ruler of the towns he founded, which Daudu named 'Ibdabu'.

During the 19th century, the position was second in importance only to the emir. It was usually reserved for a senior son or brother of the emir. The Galadima was also responsible for administering the towns of Dawakin Kudu and Tsakuwa.

Under colonial Nigeria, the Galadima was a member of the Native Authority Council and was in charge of central departments like police, works, health, and the city of Kano. The officeholder was also responsible for all the over 500 ward-heads of Kano City.

Several Emirs previously held the title of Galadima before their appointment, such as Ibrahim Dabo, Abdullahi Maje Karofi, Abdullahi Bayero, Muhammed Tukur, and Muhammad Inuwa.

=== Zazzau ===
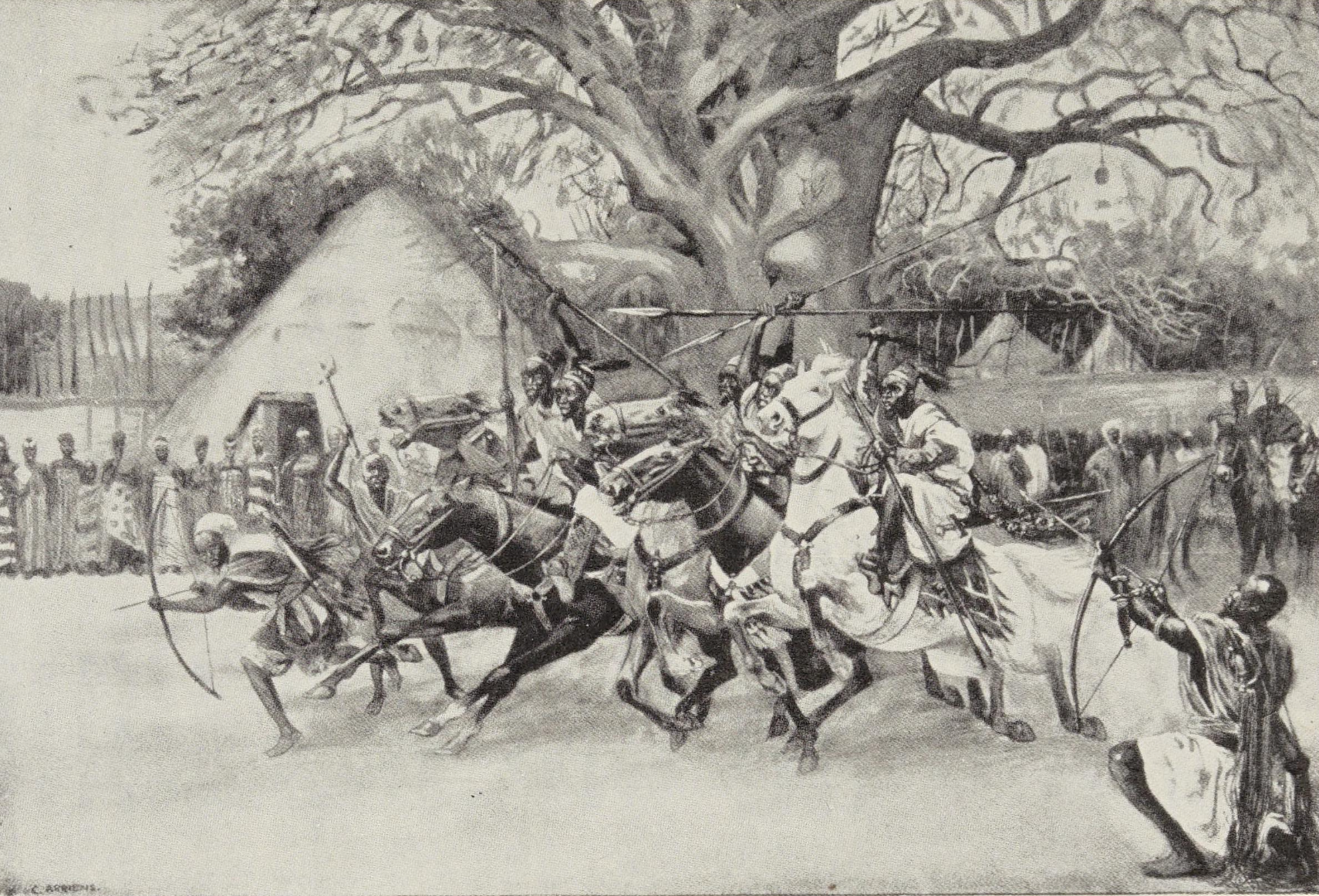
Horse games before the compound of the Galadima of Chamba in Adamawa (1913)

In the pre-19th century Kingdom of Zazzau, the office of the Galadima was assigned to a slave of the Sarki (ruler). Despite their status, the officeholder wielded significant power within the kingdom. They were part of the electoral college responsible for selecting new kings and served on the Council of State, which governed the kingdom alongside the Sarki. Additionally, the Galadima led the kingdom's police force. The Galadima administered the capital while the king went to war. His deputy was the Dallatu, who was primarily responsible for supervising the arrangements of war camps.

Under the Sokoto Caliphate, Zazzau went through some administrative changes. The Galadima was part of the electoral college and the emir's war-council. [1]: 95 It was one of the few high-ranking offices reserved for non-relatives of the emir, not longer reserved for only eunuchs. However, this rule was occasionally ignored by certain emirs. [1]: 114 The position retained its status as the most senior public office in the Zazzau government.

=== Abuja ===
After the Sokoto Jihad in 1804, the Zazzau Hausa state transitioned into an emirate that owed allegiance to the Sokoto Caliphate. The state's ousted rulers (masu sarauta) fled south and, in 1828, founded the town of Abuja, named after its founder, Abu Ja.

Much of the administrative structure of this new state was adopted from pre-jihad Zazzau. The Sarki (king) retained a staff of eunuchs, who played an important role in the administration of the state. The office of Galadima was assigned to the most senior eunuch public official. Assisted by two other senior eunuchs (rukuni), Wombai and Dallatu, the Galadima was responsible for civil administration, which included overseeing the police, prisons, markets, and supplies to the capital and the army. The Galadima was also part of the royal electoral council, which decided the succession of the state. The Galadima also officiated at the marriages and naming ceremonies of the Sarki's children.

As head of the state police, the Galadima used his personal residence as a place for punishing offenders. His deputy, Dallatu, headed the army's civil administration. While the Galadima did not participate in wars, he remained in the capital to administer the state.

The administration of the capital was divided between the two most senior state officials, the Galadima and the Madawaki (commander-in-chief). Each governed half of the capital as a fief, a system designed to neutralise their influence within the state, preventing either from seizing power through a coup without the consent of the other. As the Galadima was a eunuch, the Sarki could rely on him to side with him against the Madawaki.

== Sokoto Caliphate ==
The first Galadima of Sokoto was Doshero bin Mujakka, a Fulani mallam (Islamic scholar) from Katsina. He held the same office in Gobir, but his immediate support for the Sokoto jihad earned him the favour of the Sokoto leaders. His descendents continue to hold this office. The officeholder, alongside the Waziri, Magajin gari, and Magajin rafi, formed the core of the Caliph's council. By the early 20th-century, the Galadima was responsible for administering about 200 towns and villages scattered all over Sokoto.

The Galadima also represented the central government in the Emirate of Katsina. Among other duties, the officeholder was responsible for turbanning all newly appointed Emirs of the Emirate and collecting the annual tribute from Katsina to Sokoto.
