= Kano Emirate =

Muslim state in northern Nigeria

Kano Emirate Masarautar Kano الدولة الإمارة آل كانو
- 1807–1903
- Flag
- Motto: Jalla Babbar Hausa
- Anthem: Busar Bagauda; Drum of Bagauda
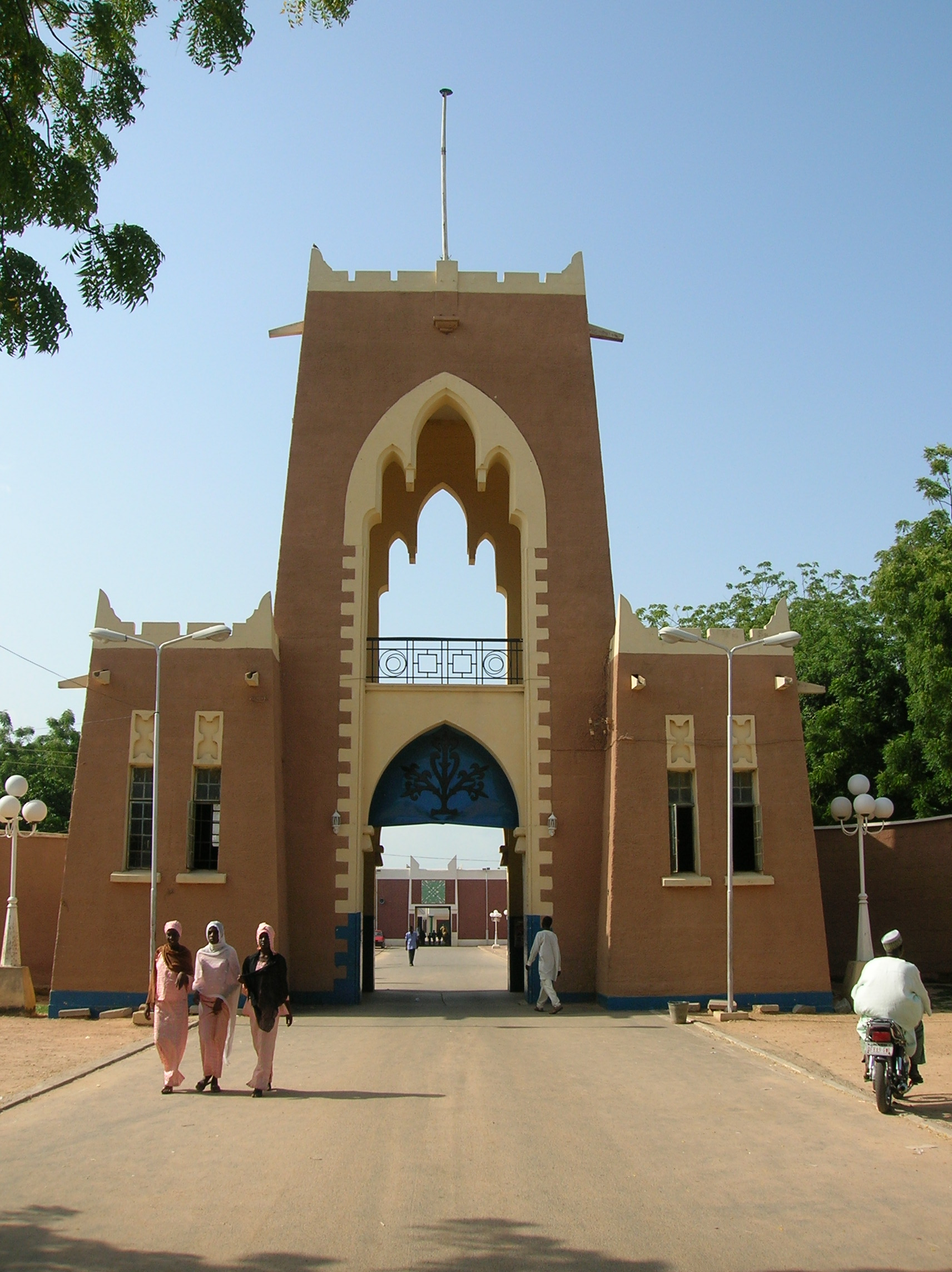
- Gate to the Gidan Rumfa, the Emir's palace
- Status: Vassal of the Sokoto Caliphate (1807–1903); Currently non-sovereign monarchy within Nigeria
- Capital: Kano
- Common languages: Arabic (official), Hausa, Fulfulde
- Religion: Sunni Islam (Official) Bori
- Government: Sarauta-Emirate
- Emir of Kano
  - 1807–1819: Suleman Abu Hama (first)
  - 1889–1903: Aliyu Babba (last sovereign)
  - 2024–present: Muhammad Sanusi II
- Legislature: Kano Emirate Council

Establishment
- History
  - Vassal of the Sokoto Caliphate: 1807
  - Native Authority under British colonial rule: 1903
  - Native Authority within the Nigerian First Republic: 1960
  - Non-sovereign monarchy in Nigeria: 1966
  - Established: 1807
  - Disestablished: 1903
- Currency: Dirham, Salt, Gold
Preceded by
Kingdom of Kano
- Today part of: Kano State, Nigeria

The Kano Emirate was a Muslim state in northern Nigeria formed in 1805 during the Fulani jihad when the Muslim Hausa-led Sultanate of Kano was deposed and replaced by a new emirate which became a vassal state of the Sokoto Caliphate. During and after the British colonial period, the powers of the emirate were steadily reduced. The emirate is preserved and integrated into modern Nigeria as the Kano Emirate Council.

== History ==
=== Hausa kingdom and Sultanate ===
The Hausa Kingdom of Kano was based on an ancient settlement of Dala Hill. According to the Kano Chronicle, while small chiefdoms were previously present in the area, Bagauda, a grandson of the mythical hero Bayajidda, became the first king of Kano in 999, reigning until 1063. Muhammad Rumfa ascended to the throne in 1463 and reigned until 1499. During his reign he reformed the city, expanded the Sahelian Gidan Rumfa (Emir's Palace), and played a role in the further Islamization of the city as he urged prominent residents to convert. The Hausa state remained independent until the Fulani conquest of 1805.

=== Fulani conquest and rule ===
At the beginning of the 19th century, Fulani Islamic leader Usman dan Fodio led a jihad affecting much of northern Nigeria, leading to the emergence of the Sokoto Caliphate. Kano became the largest and most prosperous province of the empire. It was one of the last major slave societies. Heinrich Barth, a classical scholar who spent several years in northern Nigeria in the 1850s, estimated the percentage of slaves in Kano to be at least 50%, most of whom lived in slave villages.

From 1893 until 1895, two rival claimants for the throne fought a civil war. With the help of royal slaves, Yusufu was victorious over Tukur and claimed the title of emir.

=== Fall ===
The British pacification campaign termed the Kano-Sokoto Expedition set off from Zaria at the end of January 1903 under the command of Colonel Thomas Morland, heading up a force of British officers and N.C.O.s and 800 African rank and file. Apart from a company of mounted infantry and a few gunners, the whole force consisted of infantry. They were supported, however, by four 75-mm. mountain guns, which could, if necessary, be dismantled and transported by porters, and by six machine guns.

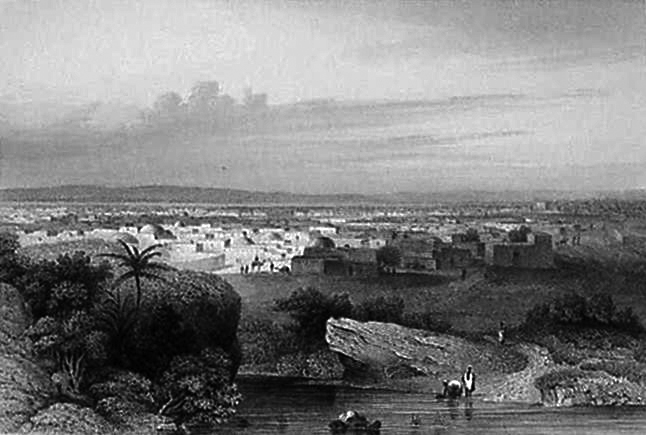
1850 steel engraving of Kano

After sporadic fighting outside the walls of the fort, the British managed to penetrate the defensive parameters of the capital. Kano was mostly left defenseless at the time. The emir, Aliyu Babba, was away with its large contingent of cavalry for the autumn campaign at Sokoto. Madakin Kano, a local noble, rallied whatever troops there were still in the city to defend it. Despite his efforts, the British successfully took over the city after heavy fight wherein the defenders sustained 70 casualties. News of the British capture of Kano in February 1903 sent the cavalry in a long march to retake the city.

After successfully defeating the British in three encounters, on 27 February 1903, Ahmadu Mai Shahada, Grand Vizier of Kano, and much of the Kano cavalry was ambushed at Katarkwashi. The death of the vizier and subsequent capture and exile to Lokoja of Emir Aliyu Babba spelled the formative end of the Kano Emirate. The British made Kano an important administrative centre and kept most of the emirate's institutions in the form of the Kano Emirate Council, subject to the British crown in a newly formed state called Northern Nigeria.

== Emirs ==
=== Emirs of Kano under Sokoto vassalage ===
Emirs under Sokoto Caliphate vassalage were:

- Suleiman dan Abu Hamma (r. 1805–1819)
- Ibrahim Dabo dan Mamudu (r. 1819–1846)
- Usman I dan Ibrahim Dabo (r. 1846–1855)
- Abdullah Maje Karofi dan Ibrahim Dabo (r. 1855–1883)
- Muhammad Bello dan Ibrahim Dabo (r. 1883–1892)
- Mohammed Tukur dan Muhammad Bello (r. 1893–1894)
- Aliyu Babba dan Abdullahi Maje Karofi (r. 1894–1903)

== See also ==
- List of rulers of Kano
