= Ibrahim Dabo =

Emir of Kano

- Sarki; Emir
- 19th century flag of the Kano Emirate, which was ruled by Dabo from 1819 to 1846

2nd Emir of Kano
- Reign: 1819–1846
- Predecessor: Suleiman
- Successor: Usman I
- Born: Unknown
- Died: 1846; Kano, Kano Emirate, Sokoto Caliphate
- Burial: Tomb of Ibrahim Dabo, Kano, Kano Emirate
- Spouse: Maryam bint Uthman among others
- Issue: See below
- Dynasty: Suleibawan Dabo
- Father: Mahmud
- Mother: Halimatu
- Religion: Sunni Islam

Ibrahim Dabo was the leader of the Fulani Sullubawa in Kano and founder of the eponymous Dabo dynasty. His progeny has lasted over two centuries reigning as Muslim rulers of the ancient city-state of Kano. The dynasty has become synonymous with the ancient city-state in affectionate sayings as "Kano ta Dabo Cigari". They have independently ruled the Kano Emirate from 1819 until the Battle of Kano in 1903 which as a result of British colonisation transformed into the Kano Emirate Council.

Dabo reigned as Emir of Kano from 1819 to 1846. He embarked upon policies to centralize the administration and raise revenue. During his reign he was responsible for establishing several ribats, including Fanisau and Waceni. His centralization saw the revival of old royal slave titles which he exploited to consolidate his power. Dabo invaded the Ningi chiefdom but was defeated by Gwarsum at Basshe.

In order to re-establish his authority and independence, Dabo re-introduced the elaborate court and regalia of the Bagauda dynasty after the Kano Emirate was invaded by Muhammad al-Kanemi of Bornu who was looking to seize the city-state as a buffer zone between the Bornu Empire and the Sokoto Caliphate, his army was subsequently annihilated by the Emir of Bauchi after having failed to breach the ancient Kano city walls.

== Biography ==
Dabo was a pious Islamic scholar and one-time student of Emir Suleimanu, one of Dabo's works Kaff al-Ikhwani has been recovered and was later published. He was known to have written out the Qur'an and had three daughters and several sons.

1.Abdulmalik bn Ibrahim: was probably the eldest of the sons or children of mallam Ibrahim dabo. He was born before his father became the Amir of Kano. He held the title of Chiroman Kano and he died before his father

2. Kwairanga: he was another son of dabo. He was probably born before his father was appointed as the Amir of Kano. He also held the title of Chiroman Kano he died before his father

3.Mahmood: was named after his grandfather Moroni Mahmood the father of mallam Ibrahim dabo. He once led a military battalion from ma k and fought to defend the unity and territorial integrity of the sokoto caliphate. He also held the title of Chiroman Kano and died before his father

4. Yusufu: was also Dabo's son. He held the title of dan lawan. At one time he was one of the princes that were recommended to occupy the position of Amir but one of his brothers got the position

5. Abdulsalam: was another son of dabo. He held the title of San Turakin Kano

6. Abdulrahman: also a son of mallam dabo he held the title of dan isan Kano

7. Usman: a son of Amir Ibrahim dabo. He was the one that succeeded Ibrahim dabo as the Amir of Kano immediately after the death of his father in 1846. It was the first time a son succeeded his father as Amir of Kano in the post jihad period. He died in ringim which was part of his domain in 1855 and for that he was nicknamed maje-ringim. He was named after the great sheikh Usman danfodio

8. Abdullahi: a son of mallam dabo which succeeded his elder brother Usman maje ringim as Amir of Kano in 1855. He was named abdullahi by his father after the younger brother of sheikh Usman danfodio the great scholar sheikh abdullahi danfodio. He died in 1882 at karofi on his way to kauran Makoda to meet the Amirul Mu'minuna. And for that he was nicknamed maje karofi This dabo son had more children than any of his brothers and sister and for that his family unit within the larger dabo family is more populated.

9. Muhammad bello: he was also a son of mallam dabo. He succeeded his elder brother Abdullahi maje karofi as Amir of Kano in 1882 after the death of Abdullahi maje karofi. He was named after the Amirul Mu'minuna the head of the sokoto caliphate [muhammadu bello] son of sheikh Usman danfodio

10. Hassan: He is another son of mallam dabo. He held the title of sarkin shanu. He served under his elder brother's Usman and Abdullahi. He was the most powerful and influential sarkin shanu in the history of Kano. He was always the acting Amir whenever the Amir is not in town

11. Abdulkadir: who held the title of Galadiman Kano was also a son of mallam Ibrahim dabo

12 Zubair: He was also a son of mallam Ibrahim dabo but he held no traditional title. He was called Zubairu autan dabo which he migrated from Kano to dawakin tofa when his father was alive and died there

13. Isma'ila:He was also a son of mallam dabo and also held no traditional title

14. Haruna:He was also another son of mallam dabo who held no traditional title

15. umar:He was also another son of mallam dabo who held no traditional title

16. Hussaina: one of the daughters of mallam dabo. She was the twin sister of Hassan the sarkin shanu

17. Kumboto (halima): she's also one of the daughter's of mallam dabo. She was married to madakin Kano. The town of kumbotso was said to be named after her

18. Fatima: she's also one of mallam Dabo's daughter's. She was married to mallam Yunusa the dabon danbazau

=== Rise to power ===
He was appointed Emir of Kano on 23/24 Dhul Qa’ada 1234 AH (21 September 1819) by Sultan Muhammad Bello fulfilling the wish of Emir Suleiman.

=== Death and succession ===
He died on Friday 9th Safar 1262 AH (9 February 1846) and was succeeded by his elder son Usman I. (Ado-Kurawa 1989: 53 and Last 1966: 468-9).

== Dynasty ==
Patrilineal descent is the principle behind membership in royal houses, as it can be traced back through the generations. In the Royal House of Kano, descent is traced back patrilineally to Ibrahim Dabo.

1. Usman I Maje Ringim dan Dabo (ruled 1846-1855)
2. Abdullahi Maje Karofi dan Dabo (ruled 1855-1883)
3. Muhammadu Bello dan Dabo (ruled 1883-1893)
4. Muhammadu Tukur dan Bello dan Dabo (ruled 1893-1894)
5. Aliyu Babba dan Abdullahi Maje Karofi dan Dabo (ruled 1894-1903)
6. Muhammad Abbass dan Abdullahi Maje Karofi dan Dabo (ruled 1903-1919)
7. Usman II dan Abdullahi Maje Karofi dan Dabo (ruled 1919-1926)
8. Abdullahi Bayero dan Abbas dan Abdullahi Maje Karofi dan Dabo (ruled 1926-1953)
9. Muhammadu Sanusi I dan Abdullahi Bayero dan Abass dan Abdullahi Maje Karofi dan Dabo (ruled 1954-1963)
10. Muhammad Inuwa dan Abbas dan Abdullahi Maje Karofi dan Dabo (ruled 1963 - he served for 3 months only)
11. Ado dan Abdullahi Bayero dan Abbas dan Abdullahi Maje Karofi dan Dabo (ruled 1963-2014)
12. Muhammadu Sanusi II dan Chiroman Kano Aminu dan Muhammadu Sanusi I dan Abdullahi Bayero (ruled 2014-2020)
13. Aminu dan Ado dan Abdullahi Bayero (2020–2024)
14. Muhammadu Sanusi II (2024-present)

Ibrahim Dabo was the father of Osumanu (Usman I) (ruled 1846-1855), Abdullahi (ruled 1855-1883), and Muhammad Bello (ruled 1883-1892).

== Biography in the Kano Chronicle ==
Below is a full biography of Ibrahim Dabo from Palmer's 1908 English translation of the Kano Chronicle.

The 45th Sarki was the pious and learned Ibrahim Dabo, son of Mohammadu, protector of the orphan and the poor, a mighty conqueror—a Fulani.

His mother’s name was Halimatu.

When he became Sarki he entered the Giddan Rimfa. Dabo made Sani Galadima. He, however, immediately tried to raise a revolt and incite all the towns to disaffection. The country Sarkis assembled and became “Tawayi,” from Ngogu to Damberta, from Jirima to Sankara, and from Dussi to Birnin Kudu and Karayi.

Dabo said, “I will conquer them, if Allah wills.” He entered his house and remained there 40 days praying to Allah for victory. Allah heard his prayers. He went out to hasten his preparations for war, and made a camp on Dalla Hill. Because of this he got the name of “The man who encamped on Dalla.” He spent many days on Dalla, and then returned, home.

He sent Sarkin Dawaki Manu Maituta to fight with Karayi. When the Sarkin Dawaki reached Karayi he sacked the town and returned to Dabo. Dabo said, “Praise be to God,” and prepared himself to go out to war. He went to Jirima and sacked that town and afterwards sacked Gasokoli and Jijita. Hence he was known as “Dabo, the sacker of towns.”

After he returned home he kept on sending out men to raid towns. He went in person to attack Dan Tunku and found him at Yan Yahiya. They fought. The Yerimawa ran away, and deserted Dan Tunku, who fled to Damberta, and thence, with Dabo following him, to Kazauri. When the Sarki reached the Koremma in pursuit he stopped, turned round again, and went back to Damberta, where he wrecked Dan Tunku’s house. Dabo then returned home.

Dabo was celebrated in the song:

“The sacker of towns has come:
Kano is your land,
Bull Elephant, Dabo,
sacker of towns.”

When he went to war the trumpets played:

“The sacker of towns is mounting.”

He made war on Birnin Sankara and Birnin Rano, took the town of Rano, and lived in the house of Sarkin Rano. After this exploit he shaved his head. He never shaved his head except he sacked a town.

When the Kano towns saw that Dabo would not leave any town unconquered, they all submitted to him, and his power exceeded all other Sarkis.

He had a friend whose name was Ango. When the Galadima Sani died, he made Ango Galadima, and as Galadima the latter reached great power through his pleasant manner and his persuasiveness.

In Dabo’s time there was no foreign war and people had food in plenty.

Dabo conquered and spoiled Yasko. He had many war captains, a few among whom may be mentioned as: Berde, Kano Buggali, Sarkin Dawaki Manu, Sarkin Jarumai Dumma, Sulimanu Gerkwarn Karifi (he it was who killed Tunari, the son of Sarkin Sankara), Juli Kuda, Lifidi, Maidawakin Gawo and many others. These warriors of Dabo’s time had no fear in war. When Dabo mounted to go to war no such dust was ever seen, so many were his horses. The dust was like the Harmattan.

Dabo was called “Majeka Hazo.” His was a wonderful and brilliant reign, but we will not say any more for fear of “Balazi.”

He ruled Kano 27 years and 3 months and 9 days, his reign ending on the 9th of Safar.

— Kano Chronicle

Preceded by	Emir of Kano; 1819-1846	Succeeded by Osumanu
