= 2015 Zamfara State House of Assembly election =

The 2015 Zamfara State House of Assembly election was held on April 11, 2015, to elect members of the Zamfara State House of Assembly in Nigeria. All the 24 seats were up for election in the Zamfara State House of Assembly.

== Results ==
=== Shinkafi ===
APC candidate Bello Maiwurno won the election.

2015 Zamfara State House of Assembly election
Party	Candidate	Votes	%
APC	Bello Maiwurno		
APC hold			

=== Talata Mafara North ===
APC candidate Isah Abdulmumin won the election.

2015 Zamfara State House of Assembly election
Party	Candidate	Votes	%
APC	Isah Abdulmumin		
APC hold			

=== Talata Mafara South ===
APC candidate Aliyu Ango-Kagara won the election.

2015 Zamfara State House of Assembly election
Party	Candidate	Votes	%
APC	Aliyu Ango-Kagara		
APC hold			

=== Bukkuyum South ===
APC candidate Abubakar Ajiya won the election.

2015 Zamfara State House of Assembly election
Party	Candidate	Votes	%
APC	Abubakar Ajiya		
APC hold			

=== Bukkuyum North ===
APC candidate Malam-Mani Malam-Mummuni won the election.

2015 Zamfara State House of Assembly election
Party	Candidate	Votes	%
APC	Malam-Mani Malam-Mummuni		
APC hold			

=== Gummi I ===
APC candidate Muhammad Abubukar won the election.

2015 Zamfara State House of Assembly election
Party	Candidate	Votes	%
APC	Muhammad Abubukar		
APC hold			

=== Gummi II ===
APC candidate Hashimu Shehu-Gazura won the election.

2015 Zamfara State House of Assembly election
Party	Candidate	Votes	%
APC	Hashimu Shehu-Gazura		
APC hold			

=== Maradun I ===
APC candidate Shehu Ibrahim won the election.

2015 Zamfara State House of Assembly election
Party	Candidate	Votes	%
APC	Shehu Ibrahim		
APC hold			

=== Maradun II ===
APC candidate Muazu Faru won the election.

2015 Zamfara State House of Assembly election
Party	Candidate	Votes	%
APC	Muazu Faru		
APC hold			

=== Bakura ===
PDP candidate Tukur Jekada won the election.

2015 Zamfara State House of Assembly election
Party	Candidate	Votes	%
PDP	Tukur Jekada		
PDP hold			

=== Anka ===
APC candidate Bello Fagon won the election.

2015 Zamfara State House of Assembly election
Party	Candidate	Votes	%
APC	Bello Fagon		
APC hold			

=== Maru South ===
APC candidate Abdullahi Dansadau won the election.

2015 Zamfara State House of Assembly election
Party	Candidate	Votes	%
APC	Abdullahi Dansadau		
APC hold			

=== Maru North ===
APC candidate Abu Ibrahim-Maru won the election.

2015 Zamfara State House of Assembly election
Party	Candidate	Votes	%
APC	Abu Ibrahim-Maru		
APC hold			

=== Bungudu West ===
APC candidate Mansur Muhammad Dambala won the election.

2015 Zamfara State House of Assembly election
Party	Candidate	Votes	%
APC	Mansur Muhammad Dambala		
APC hold			

=== Bungudu East ===
APC candidate Ibrahim Kwatarkwash won the election.

2015 Zamfara State House of Assembly election
Party	Candidate	Votes	%
APC	Ibrahim Kwatarkwash		
APC hold			

=== Gusau I ===
APC candidate Sanusi Rikiji won the election.

2015 Zamfara State House of Assembly election
Party	Candidate	Votes	%
APC	Sanusi Rikiji		
APC hold			

=== Gusau II ===
APC candidate Dayyabu Rijiya won the election.

2015 Zamfara State House of Assembly election
Party	Candidate	Votes	%
APC	Dayyabu Rijiya		
APC hold			

=== Tsafe West ===
APC candidate Aminu Danjibga won the election.

2015 Zamfara State House of Assembly election
Party	Candidate	Votes	%
APC	Aminu Danjibga		
APC hold			

=== Tsafe East ===
APC candidate Salisu Musa won the election.

2015 Zamfara State House of Assembly election
Party	Candidate	Votes	%
APC	Salisu Musa		
APC hold			

=== Zurmi West ===
APC candidate Maniru Gidanjaja won the election.

2015 Zamfara State House of Assembly election
Party	Candidate	Votes	%
APC	Maniru Gidanjaja		
APC hold			

=== Zurmi East ===
APC candidate Yusuf Moriki won the election.

2015 Zamfara State House of Assembly election
Party	Candidate	Votes	%
APC	Yusuf Moriki		
APC hold			

=== Birnin Magaji ===
APC candidate Kabiru Moyi won the election.

2015 Zamfara State House of Assembly election
Party	Candidate	Votes	%
APC	Kabiru Moyi		
APC hold			

=== Kaura Namoda South ===
APC candidate Lawali Dagonkade won the election.

2015 Zamfara State House of Assembly election
Party	Candidate	Votes	%
APC	Lawali Dagonkade		
APC hold			

=== Kaura Namoda North ===
APC candidate Abubakar Dahiru won the election.

2015 Zamfara State House of Assembly election
Party	Candidate	Votes	%
APC	Abubakar Dahiru		
APC hold			
