= Kabiru Ibrahim =

Nigerian politician

Deputy Speaker of the Sokoto State House of Assembly
- In office 13 June 2023 – incumbent

Deputy Leader of the Sokoto State House of Assembly
- In office 2017 – 15 August 2017
- Succeeded by: Alhaji Ibrahim Sarki

Personal details
- Party: All Progressives Congress

Kabiru Ibrahim is a Nigerian politician who serves as the Deputy Speaker of the Sokoto State House of Assembly. He was elected to the assembly and appointed Deputy Speaker.

== Background ==
Ibrahim is from Kware in Sokoto State, Nigeria.

== Political career ==
Ibrahim is a two time Deputy speaker of the Sokoto State House of Assembly. In August 2017, he was impeached after 21 members of the Assembly passed a vote of no confidence in his leadership. He was removed on the grounds that he engaged in political activities before the Independent National Electoral Commission (INEC) announced an official timetable, which was viewed as a breach of the Assembly's Standing Orders. Alhaji Ibrahim Sarki, a member representing Sokoto North II was appointed as the new Deputy House Leader.

In June 2023, he was elected unopposed as Deputy Speaker, alongside Tukur Bala Bodinga as Speaker at the opening of the 10th Sokoto State House of Assembly.

== See also ==
- Sokoto State House of Assembly
