= Tukur Bala =

Nigerian politician

Speaker of the Sokoto State House of Assembly
- In office 13 June 2023 – incumbent
- Deputy: Kabiru Ibrahim
- Constituency: Bodinga North

Personal details
- Party: All Progressives Congress

Tukur Bala is a Nigerian politician who serves as the Speaker of the Sokoto State House of Assembly. He represents the Bodinga North Constituency and is a member of the All Progressives Congress (APC).

== Early life ==
Bala is from Bodinga, Sokoto State, Nigeria.

== Political career ==
Bala was first elected to the Sokoto State House of Assembly in 2019. In June 2023, he was elected Speaker of the 10th Sokoto State House of Assembly; he was nominated and elected unopposed by his fellow members.

Under his leadership, the House has debated and passed several significant bills, including legislation on mandatory premarital medical screening and the establishment of community security frameworks.

== See also ==
- Sokoto State House of Assembly
