= Battle of Kwatarkwashi =

- Part of Pacification of Northern Nigeria
Date	27 February 1903
Location	Kwatarkwashi, Zamfara, Northern Nigeria
Result	British Victory: Dissolution of the Kano Emirate

Belligerents
Sokoto Caliphate: Kano Emirate	(United Kingdom) British Empire: Protectorate of Northern Nigeria

Commanders and leaders
Aliyu Babba; Ahmadu Shahada †	Frederick Lugard (United Kingdom) Wallace Duffield

Strength
3,000 cavalry.	100 cavalry, 2,000 infantry.

Casualties and losses
Unknown, but heavy	44 dead and wounded

The Battle of Kwatarkwashi was a decisive battle between the British administered Protectorate of Northern Nigeria and forces of the Sokoto Caliphate's Kano Emirate. The defeat of the Kano cavalry in the battle marked the formative end of the Kano Emirate.

== Background ==
In 1899, Lord Lugard had proclaimed a British protectorate over much of the Sokoto Caliphate. With the failure of numerous diplomatic overtures to the Caliph, in 1900 a military campaign was launched to subdue the caliphate. when news of the Battle of Kano and the fall of the fort of Kano reached Sokoto in February 1903, the Kano cavalry embarked on a march to retake the city.

== Battle ==
After three previous victorious encounters with British forces, a large British force from Kano ambushed the Kano cavalry at the great rocks of Kwatarkwashi. After a 6-hour encounter, the death of the vizier of Kano led the remnant of the cavalry to retreat back to Sokoto, a substantial part of the force however under Muhammad Abbas surrendered to the British and proceeded back to Kano.

At Kano, Muhammad Abbas was proclaimed Emir of Kano. The last of the Kano cavalry were integrated into the Caliphal force of Sokoto.

== See also ==
- Battle of Kano
