= Gwarsum =

Gwarsum was a 19th-century leader of the Ningi chiefdom. Little is known about him, but from around 1807 he looked to increase the size of his chiefdom in the area that is now Butawa Territory. He was known to have secured a victory over the Emir of Kano, Ibrahim Dabo, which affected relations in the area and caused numerous conflicts.

After his death he was succeeded by his son Tunsuru and then his other son Garta.
