= Abdullahi Maje Karofi =

Emir of Kano (r. 1855–1882)

- Sarkin Kano

Emir of Kano
- Caliphs: See list: Ali Babba; Ahmadu Atiku; Ali Karami; Ahmadu Rufai; Abubakar Atiku II; Mu'azu; Umaru
- Reign: 1855 – September 1882
- Predecessor: Usman Maje Ringim
- Successor: Muhammadu Bello

Galadima of Kano
- In office 1846–1855
- Emir: Usuman
- Preceded by: Suleiman Ango
- Succeeded by: Abdulkadiri ɗan Ibrahim Dabo
- Born: Abdullah b. Ibrahim b. Mahmud c.1815
- Died: 18 September 1882 (aged around 67); Karofi, Katsina Emirate (in present-day Dutsin-Ma, Nigeria)
- Burial: Karofi, Katsina Emirate
- Wives: 4
- Issue: 166 (100 daughters and 66 sons), including: Yusufu; Aliyu Babba; Muhammad Abbas; Usman Dantsoho
Posthumous name
- Ma-je-Karofi ("the one who died at Karofi")
- Dynasty: Sullubawan Dabo
- Father: Ibrahim Dabo
- Mother: Shekara
- Other names: Abdullahi Dabo; Abdu Sarkin Yanka

Abdullahi Maje Karofi ɗan Dabo (Abdullahi b. Ibrahim; c. 1815 – 1882) was Emir of Kano from 1855 until his death in 1882.

== Early life ==
Abdullahi was born around 1815 to the Islamic scholar and Sullubawa leader Ibrahim Dabo and his concubine Shekara, a princess from the ousted Hausa dynasty in Daura. Shekara was regarded as Dabo's most influential spouse, and during his reign as emir of Kano (1819–1846) she acted as a close adviser, particularly in palace affairs. She is considered one of the most celebrated women in 19th century Hausaland. Besides Abdullahi, two of her other sons, Usuman and Muhammad Bello, later reigned as emirs of Kano.

Abdullahi was raised in the household of Dan Rimi Ibrahim Barka, a high-ranking slave official. Barka, formerly a slave of the ousted Hausa ruler Muhammad Alwali, was renowned in Kano as Emir Dabo's most trusted adviser.

As part of Dabo's efforts to restore old Hausa titles in order to centralise authority, he reinstated the title of Dan Buram and gave his son Abdullahi.

== Galadima (1846–1855) ==
Emir Ibrahim Dabo died in 1846, and his son Usuman was appointed as his successor by Caliph Ali Babba of Sokoto. Acting possibly on the advice of his mother Shekara, Usuman dismissed his father's Hausa galadima, Suleiman Ango, and appointed his younger brother Abdullahi as to replace him. Contemporary sources often described Usuman as "a lazy ruler" who over-relied on his advisers and palace officials, a portrayal frequently contrasted with the noted intelligence and administrative energy of his vizier Abdullahi. To counterbalance the Galadima's unusual influence, Usuman created a small "ministerial council" composed of senior officials, enabling him to retain authority over major decisions while delegating many routine civil and military matters to Abdullahi.

When the European explorer Heinrich Barth visited Kano during Usuman's reign, he found the palace filled with "hundreds of lazy, arrogant courtiers, free men and slaves [...] lounging and idling here, killing time with trivial and saucy jokes". Galadima Abdullahi visited the palace daily to administer the government in offices and audience chambers reserved for his official duties. He also met regularly with Usuman for consultations, directives, and the reception of distinguished visitors, including the Waziri of Sokoto, the Caliph's chief vizier, whose duties included overseeing Kano affairs.

In his role as Galadima, Abdullahi occasionally commanded the Kano army in military campaigns. The most notable was around 1853, when he led the Kano contingent of the Caliphate's force against the rebel ruler of Hadejia, Buhari. According to Barth's estimates, Usuman could mobilise roughly seven thousand cavalry and twenty thousand infantry. Documents from Miga (in present-day Jigawa State) suggest that the allied force fielded about twenty thousand horses. In the ensuing Battle of Kaffur, the Caliphate's army, which was its largest force up to that time, suffered a severe defeat. Buhari's troops killed three sons of the Emir of Kano, seventeen sons of Kano's leading chiefs, and a grandson of Caliph Ali. A near contemporary account describes Buhari's surprise attack and that, as the rebel war drums sounded, "Galadiman Kano's army began to flee. Instead of bridling their horses' fronts they bridled their tails [...] Some climbed into trees and were caught in them and killed or enslaved."

In 1855, Caliph Ali Babba assembled another large force against Hadejia and appointed Usuman as its commander. The armies met at Ringim, where Buhari once again inflicted a devastating defeat, during which Usuman was killed. Abdullahi, who had accompanied his brother on the campaign, returned to Kano to await the arrival of the waziri of Sokoto, Halilu, who would deliver the caliph's letters confirming the appointment of the new emir.

== Emir (1855–1882) ==
=== Accession ===
Following the death of Emir Usuman, customary practice required the Limam (chief imam) to assume charge of the government until a new emir was appointed. However, upon returning from the Hadejia campaign, Abdullahi continued the administration of government much as he had during Usuman's reign. Although he may have acknowledged the nominal regency of Limam Sule, this arrangement effectively left control of Kano's resources and affairs in his hands. The authority to appoint successive emirs rested with the Caliph of Sokoto and his vizier, the waziri, who acted as the caliph's representative in Kano. When Waziri Abd al-Qadir b. Gidado arrived in the city, he convened the princes and leading officials at the central mosque. In accordance with established protocol, he carried two letters from the caliph: the first conveyed greetings to the assembly and condolences on the death of the emir; the second named the individual chosen to succeed as emir.

From his conversations with the waziri and "other sources," Abdullahi inferred that he had not been selected. The name reported to be in the second letter was 'Abdusallami', possibly referring either to the Turaki (Abdullahi's brother) or to a Mundubawa prince (a descendant of the first emir Suleimanu), both of whom had that name. Unwilling to accept being passed over, Abdullahi armed himself, prepared his cavalry and proceeded to the mosque with spear and sword, flanked by his royal slaves in armour. He entered the mosque and greeted the waziri, who directed him to take a seat; Abdullahi refused and stood hand on his sword. The waziri assured him that he was the chosen emir; yet when the magatakarda (chief scribe) attempted to read the second letter aloud, one of the waziri's attendants was reportedly injured or killed by Abdullahi's slaves. The waziri then took the letter and read it to the assembly, declaring Abdullahi the new emir without any sign of opposition. Abdullahi then took his place on the emir's dais. The contents of the second letter were never made public, as Abdullahi tore it up immediately afterward.

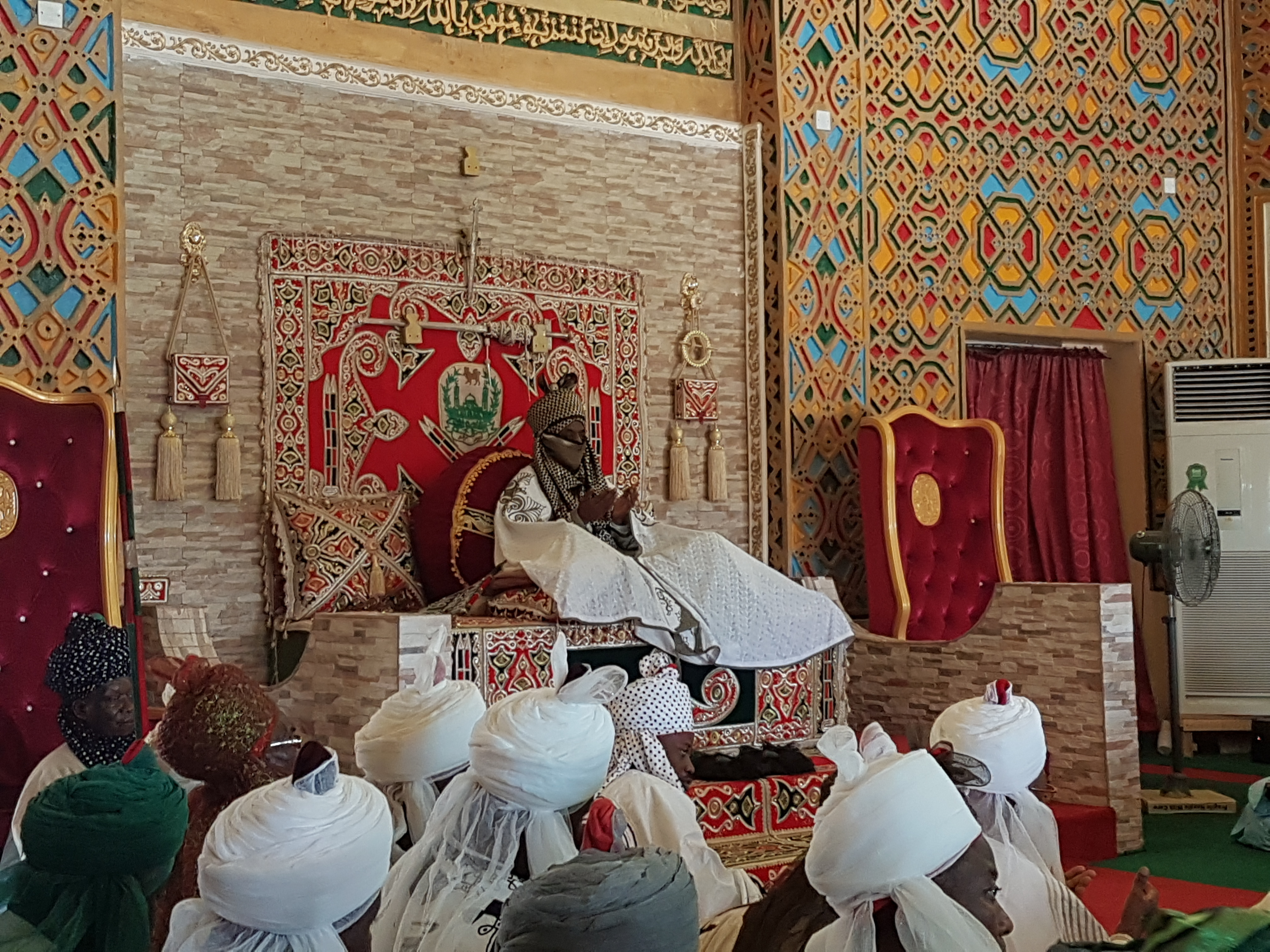
Muhammadu Sanusi II seated on the emir's dais in the palace court (2016)

Abdullahi gave the waziri the caliph's portion of Usuman's estate together with valuable gifts. When Abd al-Qadir returned to Sokoto, he was warmly welcomed by Caliph Ali Babba, who had already been informed of the events in Kano and approved of the waziri's handling of the situation. Sokoto considered Abdullahi's appointment a small concession in exchange for maintaining stability in Kano, the economic centre of the Caliphate. A succession dispute risked driving Abdullahi into alliance with Buhari of Hadejia or even with Bornu, while also encouraging further unrest from the increasingly powerful Ningi chiefdom along Kano's frontier. The waziri's decision to change the successor on the spot was regarded as legitimate because, as the caliph's representative in the emirate, he exercised wide discretionary powers, especially during such emergencies. As a public sign of approval, the caliph gave his daughter Saudatu in marriage to Abd al-Qadir.

Around 1856, during one of his visits to the region, the caliph summoned Abdullahi to Katsina for their first meeting since Abdullahi's accession. Abdullahi arrived with his forces and quartered them in the town before going, as required by custom, to pay respects to the caliph. After several hours of waiting, an order came from Ali instructing Abdullahi to remove his troops to nearby villages. Three days later, Ali summoned him without an escort. Abdullahi found the caliph seated in an inner hall of the Katsina palace among the Caliphate's senior councillors. According to tradition,

Abdullahi presented himself, sat down, and greeted the caliph humbly. After a pause, Aliyu remarked three times, "Abdullahi, you seized the throne by force," ("Ka ci da karfe"), to which Abdullahi astutely replied, "I took it with your blessing (approval)," ("Na ci da albarkarka"). Aliyu then asked Abdullahi why he had camped outside the town. Abdullahi replied that he had been ordered to do so. Aliyu then asked why Abdullahi had come to see him. Abdullahi replied that he had been ordered to do so. On this, Aliyu said, "Then why did you remain in the Gidan Rumfa (palace) after Usuman had died?" Abdullahi apologised and attempted to excuse himself. Aliyu then sent to Kano, ordering the non-royal state councillors to Katsina at once. On their arrival, he consulted with them about Abdullahi's accession.

After hearing their support for Abdullahi, the caliph formally confirmed him as emir at the Katsina palace, either shortly before or immediately after the joint campaign against Maradi. As a sign of reconciliation and goodwill, Ali married his eldest daughter to Abdullahi.

=== Military conflicts and establishment of ribats ===
Abdullahi devoted much of his early reign to repelling attacks from the Damagaram Sultanate and the Emirate of Gumel in the northeast, as well as the increasingly serious threat posed by Ningi. In 1854–55, the ruler of Damagaram, Tanimu, launched an attack on northern Kano territory but was repelled, largely because his cavalry struggled with the marshy terrain. The campaign became known as Yakin Ruwa ("War of Water"). Tanimu returned in 1857, sacking Duguyawa before moving north to attack Kazaure, where he killed the emir Dambo, likely in an attempt to secure his submission and vassalage. After this, Damagaram left Kano in relative peace for over thirty years. During Abdullahi's reign, Kano also faced persistent raids from Maradi, led by its formidable ruler Dan Baskore (1854–1875).

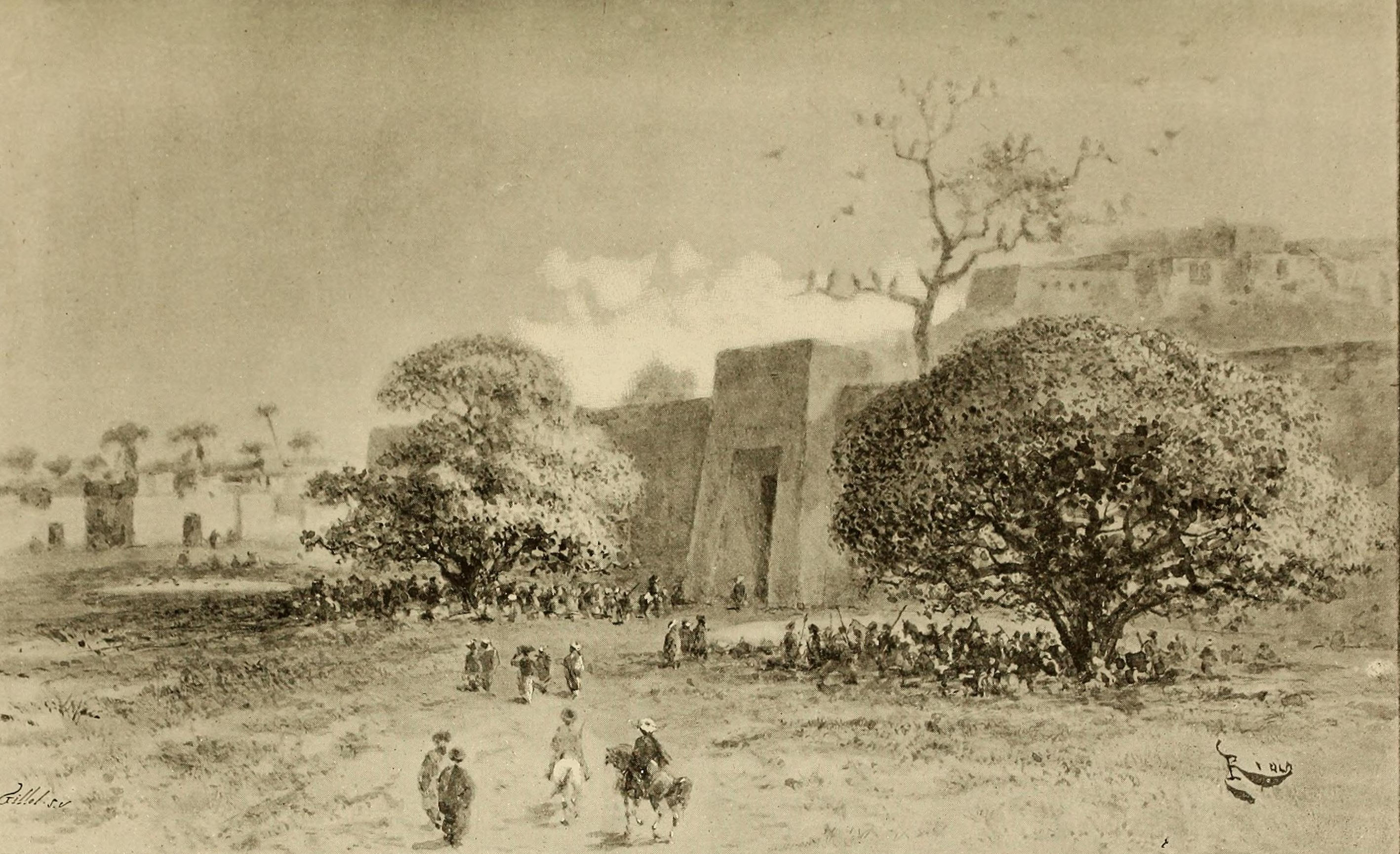
1890 depiction of one of the gates to the Kano palace

In 1855, the Ningi Chiefdom carried out a particularly devastating raid, penetrating well within twenty miles of Birnin Kano. On their return, they were intercepted at Tugugu by Sarkin Rano Aliyu, who inflicted heavy losses and recovered much of the looted booty. Two years later, however, Ningi forces defeated and killed Aliyu during an attack on Rano and went on to ravaged the area. Ningi remained active in 1856, destroying crops and settlements, and enslaving several captives. In 1860, they destroyed the newly founded town of Tudun Wada. To contain these incessant attacks, Abdullahi established a chain of ribats (frontier military settlements) along the Ningi route into Kano. For two years, he founded and repaired ribats at Sumaila, Tudun Wada, Falali, Matugwai, Birnin Bako, and Takai. These were garrisoned with substantial forces and functioned as fortified military colonies. Scholars were appointed as imams, judges, legal inspectors, and teachers. Many of the ribats became populated largely by slaves captured during the Ningi wars, some of whom developed extensive plantations to support the settlements. The policy of frontier ribats was well established across the Caliphate and had earlier been introduced into Kano by Abdullahi's father Ibrahim Dabo.

The Emir of Bauchi Ibrahim also waged campaigns against Ningi and built ribats along his frontier, but he failed to bring them to a decisive battle. Seeking to force such a confrontation, Abdullahi asked Ibrahim to attack the Ningi and their allies, driving them northwest toward Kano troops. The active front extended for roughly seventy miles, from Birnin Bako eastwards toward Gwaram and Fagam, where many inhabitants supported the Ningi against their chiefs. Fagam was overrun and its elders killed, while the Warjawa and the people of Gwaram were subdued. Abdullahi's forces destroyed Ningi crops, and at times he surrounded their rocky strongholds and besieged them until they ran out of supplies. At Tufi, the armies of Kano and Dan Maje fought an intense battle lasting two to three days. After joining forces with troops from Bauchi at Banga, Abdullahi advanced on the Ningi capital, only to find it deserted. On receiving news that Dan Maje had attacked Garun Ali, some forty-five miles to the northwest, he moved quickly to its defence and established a garrison at Falali to the southeast. He remained there for three years. When Abdullahi finally withdrew to Birnin Kano in 1863–64, Ningi raids on the emirate's frontier resumed. His son Yusufu, stationed at the ribat of Takai, was tasked with leading the campaigns against them. Although he initially suffered setbacks against Dan Maje's forces, he later distinguished himself as a capable commander. Despite these later successes, Kano never succeeded in bringing Ningi under its authority. Ningi forces continued to raid with impunity, destroying Tudun Wada twice more, in 1873 and 1880. They also remained active in southeastern Kano, though Abdullahi's fortifications prevented them from penetrating the central districts of the emirate again.

At some point, Abdullahi sent an expedition to Zaria against its emir Abdullahi dan Hamada, who ruled the emirate from 1856–1870 and again from 1873–1878. This unusual incursion was reported to the caliph at Sokoto who ordered the Kano troops to be recalled. According to M G Smith, the conflict likely arose over the respective rights of the two emirs to tax and administer those Fulani pastoralists who crossed over (ketare) their common frontiers. In the caliphate, jangali (cattle tax) normally followed the pastoralists' established allegiance, so herders who had paid in one emirate were not expected to meet fresh demands simply because they shifted their seasonal grazing grounds. Zaria, however, lacked a substantial resident Fulani population and thus depended on taxing incoming herds during the dry season. Its attempts to levy jangali on Kano pastoralists who had already paid at home created the double taxation that prompted their complaints. For Emir of Kano Abdullahi, this amounted to an encroachment on Kano's rights over its pastoral subjects, and his invasion of Zaria was likely intended to assert those claims. The caliph ultimately affirmed Zaria's right to levy taxes on pastoralists entering its territory, citing the emirate's lack of resident Fulani and the emirate's need for additional revenue. This ruling brought the dispute to a formal end and led to the withdrawal of the Kano forces.

=== Administration ===
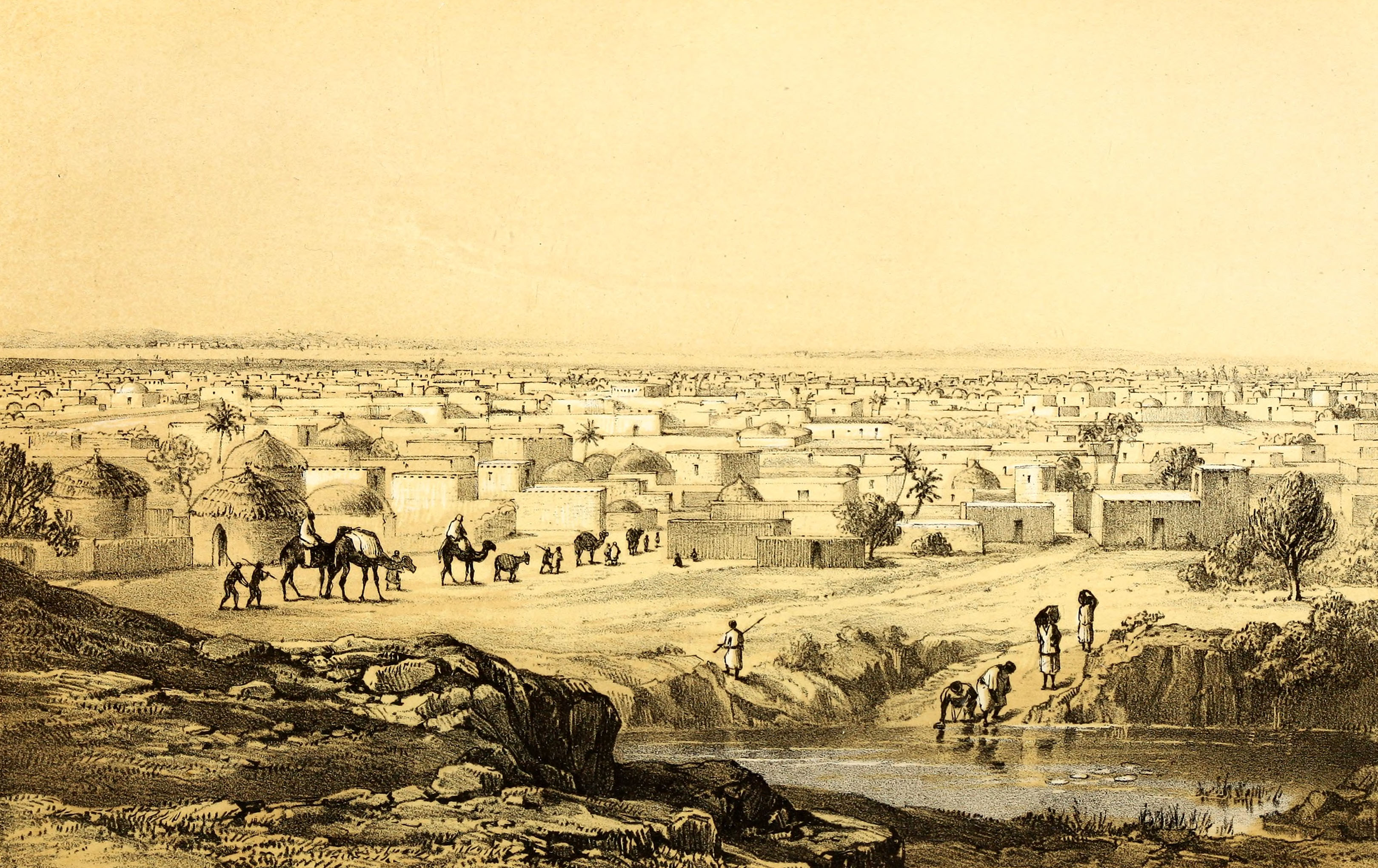
View of Birnin Kano from the Dalla Hill (1851)

One of Abdullahi's earliest acts as emir was the summary execution of the Shamaki Isa, Usuman's senior slave. The reasons for Isa's execution are unclear: he may have insulted or obstructed Abdullahi during Usuman's reign or opposed his accession. Whatever the cause, the act sent a clear signal to the palace slaves and officials regarding the authority and power of the new ruler. Despite the importance of the office, the execution was legal, as a slave could be punished or disposed of at his master's discretion. Abdullahi subsequently appointed his own slave, Maigari, a man from Bebeji, as shamaki.

Soon after his accession, Abdullahi focused mainly on strengthening Kano's defences and spent long periods away from the capital on the frontiers. During these absences, routine administration continued under the supervision of his brother, the Sarkin Shanu Hassan, who worked closely with councillors resident in Kano. Hassan maintained constant communication with the emir and regularly referred important or complex matters to him for decision. Judicial affairs were handled by the senior alkali's court, which administered shariʿa law without a superior court in Abdullahi's absence. Cases involving capital punishment or mutilation were reported to the emir by mounted messengers for his approval. Abdullahi also established the office of Alkalin Kasuwa (judge of the market), with jurisdiction over commercial disputes and minor cases arising in Kano's markets. Following a practice started by Sarkin Kano Shashere (1573–1582), he travelled on campaign with a trained jurist to advise on legal matters, particularly on cases involving executions or mutilations.

In keeping with Kano's constitutional practice, Abdullahi formally left the Sarkin Shanu in charge of government while he was away. In practice, however, the length of Abdullahi's absences made the Sarkin Shanu his de facto vizier. This limited the authority of the galadima, Abdulkadiri, whose office traditionally outranked that of other officials and who had expected to exercise greater influence, especially following Abdullahi's own unprecedented power as galadima under Emir Usuman. The situation likely frustrated Abdulkadiri and eventually alienated his sympathies. When Abdullahi returned to Kano around 1863–65, he resumed direct control of the administration. Although Abdulkadiri once again had hopes of becoming vizier, these were thwarted, and he reportedly began spreading rumours that the emir had placed a fetish within the palace and was conducting pagan rituals (tsafi) to enhance his physical and political power. Abdullahi reported the Abdulkadiri's conduct to the caliph and the waziri and sought permission to remove him from office. Approval was granted, and Abdullahi replaced him as galadima with the Ciroma Yusufu, his son by a daughter of Caliph Ali Babba.

On his appointment as galadima, Yusufu, then about twenty five years old, was sent south to command Kano forces against the Ningi. In his capacity as chief administrator, Abdullahi relied heavily on his Fulani client Mallam Dogo, who had campaigned with him during the Ningi wars. Abdullahi granted him the title Sarkin Yaki (war chief). Dogo handled audiences and routine communications at the palace, while important issues and law cases were handled by Abdullahi.

Between 1855 and 1863 Kano experienced a prolonged famine known as banga banga, followed later by another severe famine, the yunwar dagiya, around 1878. On both occasions, state granaries and reserves were opened for public relief and grain was distributed through official channels. Abdullahi also appealed to neighbouring emirs for assistance in supplying food to the population.

=== Law ===
It was a righteous reign, one that held fast to the Shari'a,
Was Abdullahi's; no wrong was done to anyone.

— Song of Bagauda

Even as early as when he was Usuman's vizier, when he presided over the emir's court, Abdullahi gained a reputation as an incorruptible judge and became locally renowned for his strict devotion to shariʿa. On one occasion, the European explorer Heinrich Barth brought before him a complex dispute involving Arab merchants who were withholding payments owed to him. Although the case presented opportunities for legal corruption, Abdullahi adjudicated it swiftly and impartially. On his appointment as emir, Abdullahi moved decisively to curtail the widespread banditry that had flourished under Usuman's much more lenient rule. He was said to have carried this out with such fervour that, according to the Kano Chronicle, he became known as "Abdu Sarkin Yanka" ("Abdu, the chief of cutting"), which reflected his readiness to execute robbers and enforce the punishment of amputation for convicted thieves.

Abdullahi's long judicial career also features prominently in Hausa folk tales. One well known tale tells how he hastily ordered the hands of a man's hand to be cut off after being convinced by circumstantial evidence of theft. Later that same day, the accuser (an old woman) returned to withdraw her charge, having discovered that the item she believed stolen had actually been borrowed by a relative. Abdullahi was overwhelmed with grief by this miscarriage of justice, particularly because he had failed to allow the accused to clear himself by taking an oath on the Qur'an, as prescribed by shariʿa. He sent for the man, expressed profound remorse, and offered ten of everything - horses, cattle, slaves, concubines and bags of cowries - as tokens of compensation and regret.The man declined these gifts, leaving the matter to the judgment of Allah. Abdullahi then secluded himself in grief for several weeks, and thereafter never again judged criminal cases involving execution or amputation, but left those to the alkali.

To ensure more rigorous enforcement of shari'a, Abdullahi established rural courts throughout the emirate. He is also credited with creating the office of Alkalin Kasuwa (Judge of the Market), responsible for clearing commercial cases quickly in Kano's central market. On Abdullahi's encouragement, the Alkali of Kano, Muhammad Zangi, wrote an account of the history of Kano titled Taqyid al-akhbar, copies of which are preserved across Nigeria. Zangi died in 1869, and was succeeded by his younger brother, Ahmadu Rufaʿi, as chief judge. Not long afterward, however, Abdullahi ordered Rufa'i's execution without a public trial. Although the caliph and the waziri were informed, no action was taken against the emir. While the incident is only briefly mentioned in the Kano Chronicle, it is well remembered in Sokoto. Rufa'i was believed to have committed a serious offence warranting execution under shariʿa, and later inquiries suggested that the charge may have involved sexual abuse of a female ward.

=== Caliphal relations ===
==== Ahmadu Rufa'i affair ====
Following the death of Caliph Ali Babba in 1859, Ahmadu Zaruku was selected as his successor. Ahmadu Rufa'i, who had been passed over in favour of a nephew for the second time, left Sokoto and travelled eastward, possibly intending to continue on pilgrimage to Mecca. Suspecting that he might instead seek support among the eastern emirates for his own succession, the authorities in Sokoto dispatched messengers to Kano and other emirates instructing them to intercept and return him immediately, while cautioning against offering him excessive honours or gifts. Upon receiving these orders, Abdullahi instructed the Ma'aji, the official responsible for city administration, to keep watch for Rufa'i. When he arrived at Kano's city gates, he was denied entry. Abdullahi sent greetings and substantial gifts but ordered that Rufa'i be escorted back to Sokoto under armed guard. Rufa'i was likely unaware that Abdullahi was acting under explicit instructions from the caliph and the waziri, and he appears to have held the emir personally responsible for the humiliation, particularly the refusal of entry after a long and tiring journey.

When Ali Karami died in 1867, Ahmadu Rufa'i was appointed caliph. By that time Abdullahi was occupied on the southern front of the Ningi wars. He therefore sent a high-ranking delegation to Sokoto with the customary greetings and gifts, with instructions to declare his allegiance (mubaya'a) to the new caliph while excusing his absence on grounds of active jihad. This indirect declaration appears to have reinforced Rufa'i's belief that Abdullahi had personal hostility towards him. The new caliph then summoned Abdullahi to Sokoto. The returning delegation warned Abdullahi that the caliph was hostile and contemplating his deposition. Abdullahi travelled to Sokoto accompanied by lavish gifts and a large force of heavily-armed veterans seasoned in the Ningi campaigns. For two days after his arrival, the caliph refused to grant him an audience. Abdullahi then sought the intercession of Maryam bint Shehu Usman, Rufa'i's sister and the widow of Abdullahi's father Ibrahim Dabo, who was residing in Sokoto. He explained that his absence was due to the seriousness of the Ningi threat and that he had already waited in vain to render personal homage. He then added that, having committed no offence and having served successive caliphs loyally, he would resist any attempt at deposition, and that he intended to return to Kano the following day unless received by the Rufa'i.

Meanwhile, Caliph Rufa'i was engaged in a long discussion with his imperial councillors regarding Abdullahi's fate. He favoured deposition, citing Abdullahi's armed entourage as evidence of disloyal intent. Most councillors opposed this course, emphasising Kano's strategic importance to the Caliphate and Abdullahi's long record of service in defending its frontiers. Maryam's entry and report made the affair clearer. It appears also that, while the discussions were being held, Abdullahi paraded his troops in Sokoto, receiving a cavalry charge of allegiance (jafi), which concluded in volleys of musket-fire. Rufa'i and his councillors interpreted these signals correctly. Faced with the choice between alienating Kano or accepting Abdullahi's homage, the caliph gave in and granted him an audience. Abdullahi remained in Sokoto for seven days, meeting with the caliph, Maryam, and the imperial councillors, and repairing relations. On his return to Kano, he proceeded directly to Birnin Bako on the Ningi frontier, where he remained on campaign for the next three years. According to Sokoto tradition, Rufa'i imposed a personal tribute or fine of one million cowries a day, known colloquially at Sokoto as the kudin cefane (money for stew) on Abdullahi as the price of their reconciliation.

==== Succession crisis in Zaria ====
In 1871, Caliph Ahmadu Rufa'i deposed the Emir of Zaria Abdullahi, on charges of disloyalty and disobedience, replacing him with a dynastic rival. The deposition proved controversial, particularly in Sokoto, where the deposed emir resided after his removal. When Rufa'i died in March 1873, he was succeeded by Abubakar Atiku na Rabah, who regarded the deposition as unjust, since it had been effected without due process of law. Later that year, following the death of the new emir, the caliph restored Abdullahi to the throne of Zaria without consulting the local electors. News of his return alarmed senior officials who, under established conventions, had received portions of Abdullahi's estate at the time of his deposition. A revolt broke out, led by two of Zaria's most powerful officials, the Madaki Ali and the Galadima Hamman. Abdullahi of Zaria immediately reported the situation to Sokoto and sent forces against the rebels, who had moved southwest of the capital.

Sokoto's response was delayed, as the Waziri Halilu, who administered Zaria on behalf of the caliph, was gravely ill or already dead. Caliph Abubakar therefore instructed Abdullahi of Kano to intervene and prevent an escalation. Abdullahi immediately marched to Zaria with part of his army and camped between the two opposing forces. Of the rebel leaders, only Madaki Ali had a legitimate dynastic claim to the emirate. Abdullahi negotiated a settlement whereby the revolt would cease on the conditions that neither the madaki, the galadima, nor their supporters would be punished, and that Madaki Ali would succeed Abdullahi as emir of Zaria. Once these terms were accepted, Abdullahi of Kano informed the restored emir that the dispute was settled and instructed him not to reclaim portions of his former estate that had been distributed at his deposition, nor make reprisals. Abdullahi then withdrew his forces and returned to Kano, having successfully averted a potentially destabilising and protracted civil war by effectively committing the caliph to appoint Madaki Ali as the next emir of Zaria.

=== Palace affairs ===
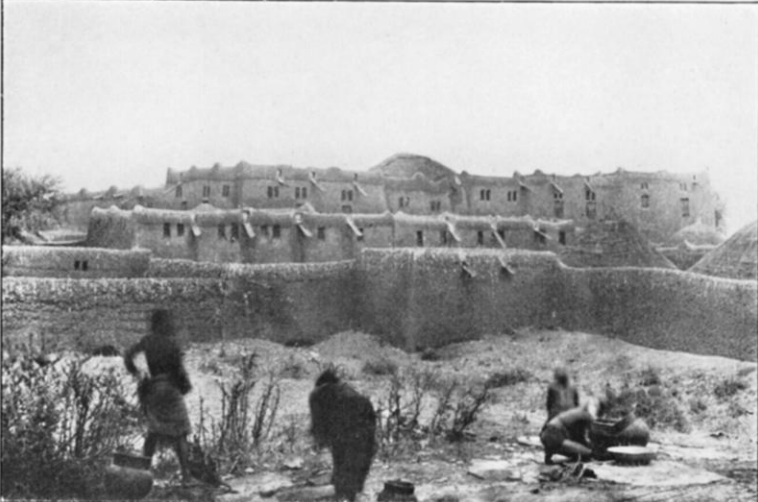
The monumental two-storied Babban Soro (lit. Big Hall) quarters constructed by Abdullahi. Photographed directly after the British conquest of Kano in 1903.

Galadima Yusufu gained considerable prestige and wealth from his successes in the wars against the Ningi and appears to have hoped to translate this military reputation into greater influence over the civil and military administration of the emirate. Although the galadima was traditionally treated as vizier, Abdullahi preferred to exercise executive authority personally, frustrating Yusufu's ambitions and generating resentment. This was compounded when Abdullahi transferred Mallam Dogo's functions as unofficial vizier to another son, the Tafida Muhammadu.

At the same time, Abdullahi's senior palace eunuch, the Sallama Barka, served as the main intermediary between the emir and some senior officials, including the galadima. Over time, the sallama developed a close relationship with Yusufu and kept him informed of confidential palace matters. Abdullahi's last major military expedition, a successful campaign against Maradi, took place in the 1870s. By then he was in his sixties, and advancing age. He was also inflicted with haemorrhoids, which made it difficult for him to ride long distances. The sallama kept Yusufu informed of his father's declining health and of growing dissatisfaction among sections of the Fulani aristocracy. During Abdullahi's long absences from the palace, some throne slaves began courting and eventually marrying free women. Several of these women were from aristocratic Fulani lineages, including members of the leading clans of Yolawa, Danbazawa, and Danejawa. Many them had rejected marriages arranged by their families and sought refuge in the palace, where the emir, as imam of Kano, was expected to provide protection to all free women who arrived at his palace regardless of status. Responsibility for their welfare lay with the Uwar Soro, the emir's senior wife, but during her absences with Abdullahi on campaign, effective supervision was limited, as the Sarkin Shanu was barred from entering the women's quarters.

As only Abdullahi had the authority to dissolve the marriages of palace slaves, aristocratic families held him personally responsible for these unions. There is no evidence that he ended any of them. Although deeply offensive to the Fulani elites, the marriages were legally valid under Islamic law, constraining Abdullahi, who was widely known for adherence to shariʿa. He was also bound by the principle of amana, which obliged him to safeguard the interests of his slaves. By this time, the aging emir increasingly relied on palace slaves for political and military support, and interference risked undermining this relationship. Heidi J. Nast has argued that Abdullahi may have instituted the uku-uku ("three-three") facial markings at this point to mitigate resentment from his Fulani detractors. These consisted of three small marks cut whisker-like into both cheeks of infants born to palace slave women shortly after birth. Other traditions, however, attribute the practice to Abdullahi's father, Emir Ibrahim Dabo.

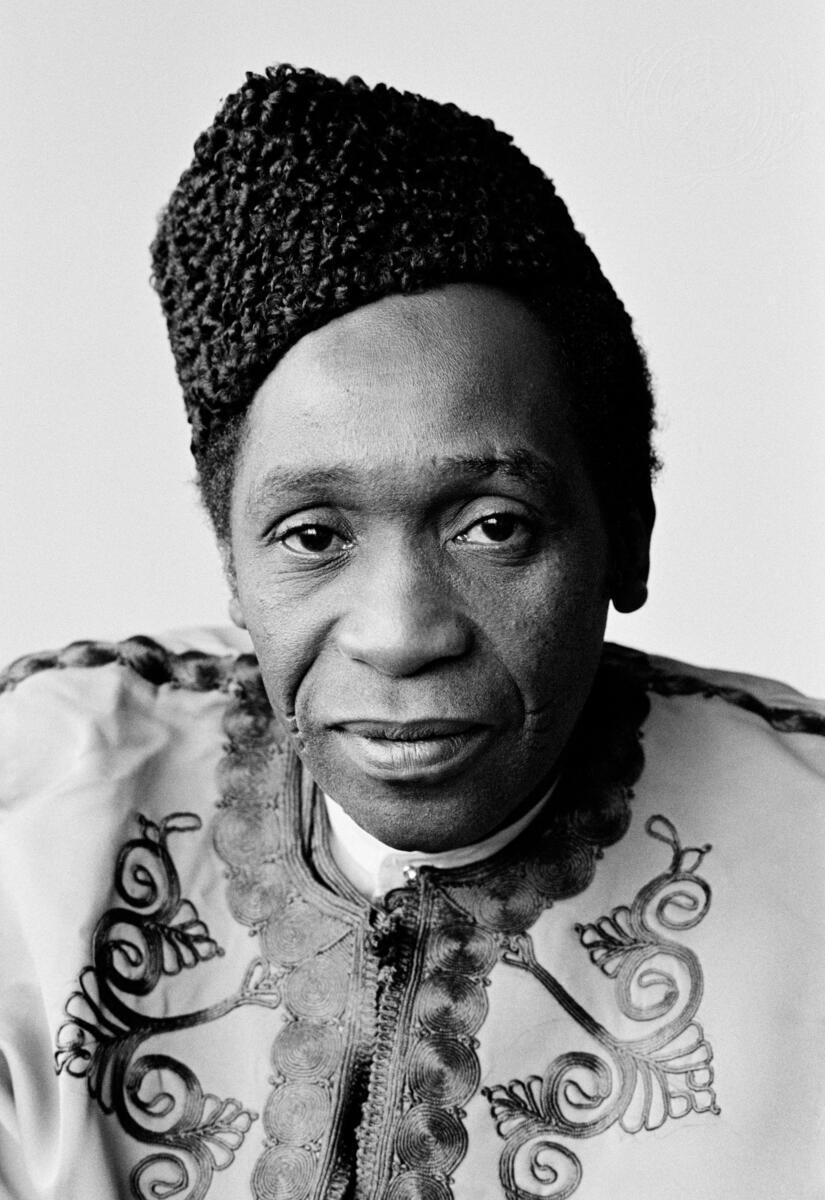
Nigerian statesman Maitama Sule, a descendant of Kano palace slaves, famously bore the uku-uku marks.

Fulani disaffection and frustration with these affairs increased. Galadima Yusufu, increasingly impatient for succession, set out to exploit what he perceived as his father's declining authority. The sallama actively encouraged Yusufu's ambitions. Although classified as a eunuch, the sallama appears not to have been physically castrated; in Kano, men deemed sexually inactive were sometimes referred to as eunuchs. As Abdullahi's chief eunuch and confidential agent, he had unrestricted access to the palace and harem. During Abdullahi's decline, the sallama reportedly recovered his potency and secretly seduced a number of the emir's concubines, whose fears of death if discovered ensured their silence.

Historian Sean Stilwell, however, argues that there was no "Sallama Barka" and that the conspirator was more likely Dan Rimi Salam, who may have schemed with Yusufu to remove Abdullahi. Salam either died or was dismissed and replaced by Malam Barka, son of Ibrahim Barka, who himself was later removed by Abdullahi's successor for overreaching his authority.

==== Yusufu's failed coups ====
Perhaps through Yusufu, Sokoto was apparently led to believe that Abdullahi was no longer physically capable of leading his armies. During a visit to Sokoto, Abdullahi was tactfully questioned on the matter and reportedly responded by demonstrating his fitness through a mounted salute, charging at the gallop while muskets were fired. The display sufficiently impressed the caliph and waziri, who took no further action. On returning to Kano, however, Abdullahi avoided riding and campaigned no further; some say he painfully fainted after the display of horsemanship.

At another point, either on the sallama's advice or on his own initiative, Yusufu wrote to Sokoto urging that Abdullahi be retired on grounds of senility and physical incapacity. Following the death of Caliph Abubakar Atiku II in March 1877, Abdullahi travelled to Wurno to pay homage to the new caliph, Mu'azu. In a private audience, Abdullahi expressed a desire to resign due to age, on the condition that Yusufu succeed him. Mu'azu questioned him repeatedly and ultimately agreed to the abdication but rejected the condition, declaring "In that case, I release (dismiss) you; but I know whom I will appoint, and it won't be Yusufu." Hence, while accepting Abdullahi's request to abdicate, he rejected the condition, replying: "Ba kai zakaba shi ba" ("It is not for you to choose your successor"). The caliph then questioned the Waziri Abdullahi Bayero, who denied he had consulted with the emir about the matter. The council was then dismissed.

The following afternoon the matter was reopened by senior councillors, who urged Mu'azu to restore Abdullahi, arguing that dismissing a Kano emir would establish a dangerous precedent. They offered to stand surety for Abdullahi's future conduct. The galadima then asked the waziri's opinion, but before a response could be given, he concluded by imploring Mu'azu to "forgive him (Abdullahi) unless the waziri decides otherwise," since he was formally responsible for the supervision of Kano and had an intimate knowledge of its affairs. Before the Waziri Bayero could give his opinion, Mu'azu relented and announced Abdullahi's restoration. He then pulled a letter addressed to him by Yusufu and gave his scribe to read out. In it, Yusufu claimed to act as the caliph's "eyes and ears" in Kano and alleged that Abdullahi was unfit to rule under the law (shari'a) because of his sexual impotence (la'ifci). Yusufu also openly solicited the emirship and enclosed gifts (gaisuwa) to support his request.

When questioned, the waziri denied any knowledge of the letter or similar correspondence. Mu'azu likely suspected a plot, and when his council pressed to null Abdullahi's abdication, urging that the waziri should be allowed to decide, he suspected his vizier's complicity in Yusufu's plans. When the Waziri Bayero had established his ignorance of Yusufu's plot, Mu'azu declared that he would never appoint Yusufu to rule Kano. Abdullahi was informed that his abdication was refused and that he was to continue in office. During Abdullahi's week-long stay in Sokoto, he learned of the entire affair, perhaps from Mu'azu himself. On leaving for Kano, the emir's delegation, which included Galadima Yusufu and other leading notables of Kano, was escorted the customary distance by the caliph, waziri and senior councillors of Sokoto. After the final farewells, the Kano nobles continued on their route, Abdullahi riding towards the front of the column, preceded by slaves. As they neared Raba in the Rima valley, Abdullahi summoned the Sarkin Dogarai (his slave chief of police) and instructed him to remove Yusufu to the very rear of the column and place him under guard.

On entering the Kano palace, Abdullahi formally dismissed Yusufu as galadima and put him in chains. Abdullahi withdrew into seclusion for several days before ordering Yusufu's compound emptied and its contents placed in the public road. Yusufu's wives, children, slaves, livestock, arms, and wealth were confiscated, and his wives and fertile concubines and their children were put to live in quarters fit for destitutes. His infertile concubines were then taken to each of Abdullahi's surviving brothers, warning that anyone who refused these women would be regarded as hostile. When rumours circulated that Abdullahi intended to execute Yusufu as an apostate (kahiri), the emir's brothers and senior councillors intervened and forbade this in a private meeting with Abdullahi, demanding they be executed as well if Yusufu was to be harmed. Abdullahi eventually gave in, releasing Yusufu and restored to him his wives and children. Yusufu thereafter lived in "chagrin and poverty till he was penniless" until Abdullahi's death, confined to the capital where his shame could not be hid. Abdullahi appointed his scribe, Ibrahim Mai Kulutu, as galadima. He then reduced the galadima's fiefs, and removed Kumbotso, Fari, Tsenti and Kankarawa near Minjibir for distribution to his own untitled sons.

== Death ==
On his way to Sokoto accompanied by the Kano nobility, Abdullahi died at Karofi in Katsina in September 1882. He was posthumously nicknamed Maje Karofi, meaning "the one who died at Karofi". He was buried there, and in accordance with established custom, his riderless, caparisoned horse was sent to Sokoto as a signal to the caliph and the waziri of his death.

== Legacy ==
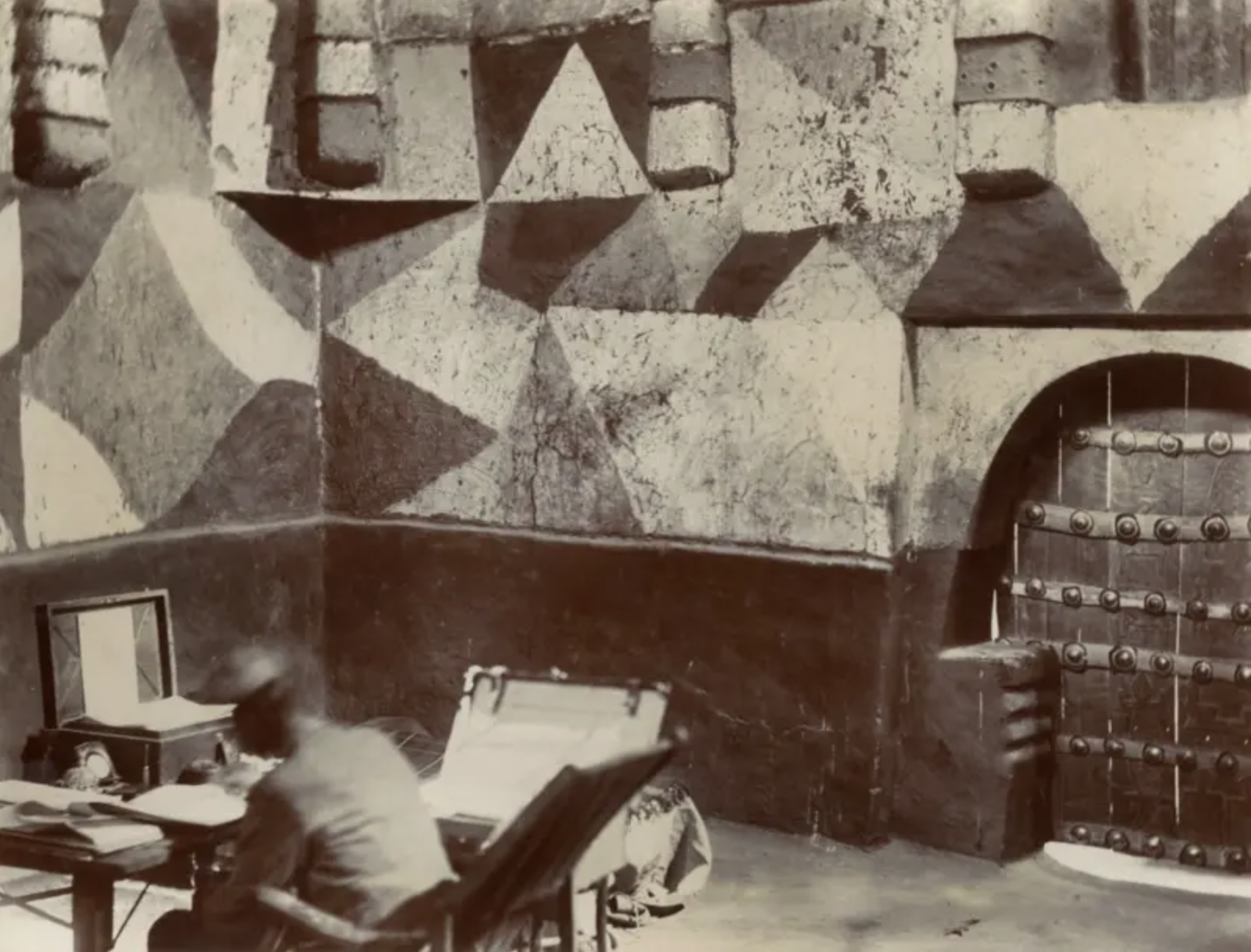
A room inside Abdullahi's Babban Soro quarters (1903). Shortly after the British conquest of Kano, Frederick Lugard (pictured) set up his office here.

By the end of Abdullahi's 27 year-long rule, Kano was arguably the strongest and most populous state in the Sokoto Caliphate, as well as the wealthiest, most central and advanced. For much of his rule, Kano experienced relative peace and prosperity, despite rising taxation and the persistent pressure of Ningi raids along the southern frontier. Through sustained military vigilance and effective use of frontier fortifications, the emirate retained its relatively dense population.

Among the 19th century Fulani rulers of Kano, Abdullahi has generally been ranked second only to his father in public view. He was widely regarded as energetic, intelligent, and forceful in character, and was especially remembered for his devotion to shari'a and his concern for judicial fairness. His long service as a judge, both before and during his reign, became the subject of several Hausa folk tales. Having loyally served under seven successive caliphs, Abdullahi was well remembered in Sokoto itself. During his reign, Kano was the Caliphate's chief resource in both war and peace. The caliphs relied heavily on Abdullahi as their Sarkin Yaki (commander-in-chief), particularly in the strategically important eastern territories.

Abdullahi's long reign and extensive campaigns enabled him to effect lasting changes in the power and stature of the emirship. While he greatly strengthened the authority of the central ruler, in constitutional terms, his record seems virtually spotless. He was not known to abuse power nor did he threaten the established rights of the Fulani aristocracy or to dismantle the privileges of founding lineages. Instead, he preserved the prescriptive rights of founding lineages to their hereditary titles, even as he enhanced the practical power of the emir's office. Militarily, his defensive campaigns were widely scattered, severe and recurrent. He led armies in the north, east, south, and west of the emirate, securing Kano's frontiers and reinforcing the authority of the ruling Fulani clans across its regions. These included the Jobawa in the southeast, the Dambazawa in the north, and the Suleibawa, Yolawa, and Danejawa in the west and southwest. Although his campaigns did not eliminate all external threats, they strengthened the perception among Kano's elite families that a strong central emirship was essential for the defence of the state and their interests.

Abdullahi is said to have had many children through his four wives and large harem. The exact figure is uncertain, with estimates ranging from 166 (100 daughters and 66 sons) to 333, the latter being more symbolic than real. Unlike his predecessor Usuman, who appointed only three to office, Abdullahi's distribution of royal offices was familistic and sectional, placing twenty-eight sons in important positions. He also strategically used his daughters to form political alliances, married them into aristocratic families, senior state officials, and rulers of sub-emirates. One daughter married a waziri of Sokoto, while another, his favourite, was married to the Sarkin Rano, appointed Magajiya and granted the town of Bichi as a fief. Abdullahi made extensive changes to the Kano palace, rebuilding and restoring several sites in the complex previously occupied by pre-jihadic Hausa kings. He commissioned the renowned Hausa builder Babban Gwani to construct a monumental two-storey Babban Soro (Big Hall), and also built Soron Giwa (Hall of the Elephant) in honour of his father. He also built Nassarawa (Victory), a vast palace and pastoral-farming slave estate, located near the city, worked by hundreds of slaves.

During the surge in nationalist sentiment in Kano that followed the deposition of Emir Muhammad Sanusi in 1963, historical tensions between Kano and Sokoto were revived in popular rhetoric. The deposition was widely viewed as a move by Ahmadu Bello, the Northern premier and Sardauna of Sokoto, to put Sanusi in his place. The movement invoked Abdullahi as a symbol of resistance to Sokoto interference in Kano affairs, and as a ruler who "did not tolerate nonsense" from Sokoto. Similarly, the successful revolt led by his sons against Emir Muhammed Tukur in the 1890s was framed as a battle against those who felt their primary allegiance was to Sokoto over Kano.

== Biography in the Kano Chronicle ==
Below is a biography of Abdullahi from Palmer's 1908 English translation of the Kano Chronicle.

The 47th Sarki was Abdulahi, son of Dabo. His mother's name was Shekkara. When he became Sarki, he set out to work to kill all the robbers and cut off the hands of the thieves. He was called "Abdu Sarkin Yenka."

because he was a strong-minded Sarki, ruthless, and victorious. He was quick to depose chiefs, but kept his word to his friends. He never stayed long in one place but went from town to town. In his time there was a very great famine, and the quarrel with Umbatu grew big from small beginnings. The Sarkin Kano was eager to make war upon Umbatu. His first move was to attack Kuluki. Dan Iya Lowal of Kano died at Kuluki, whereupon the Sarki returned home himself but sent Abdulahi Sarkin Dawaki Dan Ladan and his son Tafida to war in Zaria country. They went to Zaria together. This was in the time of Sarkin Zaria Abdulahi Dan Hamada. When they returned from Zaria it was not long before Dan Boskori made a descent upon Gworzo. The Sarkin Kano sent Sarkin Dawaki on ahead and followed himself personally to meet Dan Boskori Sarkin Maradi, west of Gworzo. A battle took place. The Kanawa ran away, deserting the Sarkin Dawaki Dan Ladan, Dan Boskori killed him. The Kanawa returned home in ones and twos.

The Sarkin Kano was very angry. He gave orders that a house was to be built at Nassarawa for him to live in during the hot season; he also built a house at Tarkai for the war with Umbatu. He had a house at Keffin Bako where he lived almost two years because of Dan Maji the neighbour of Umbatu. He fought with Warji after the war with Kuluki, and took enormous spoil. No one knows the amount of the spoil that was taken at a town called Sir. The corpses of Warjawa, slaughtered round their camp, were about 400. The Sarki returned home.

After a short time, the Sarki attacked Warji again, and once more took many spoils. Kano was filled with slaves. Abdulahi went to Sokoto, leaving his son Yusufu at Tarkai. While he was there Dan Maji came to attack Yusufu. A battle was fought at Dubaiya. The Kanawa fled and deserted Yusufu. Many men were slain and captured. After this Yusufu was made Galadima Kano, and hence acquired much power. Abdulahi sent him to Dal from Tarkai to capture Haruna, the son of Dan Maji. Yusufu met Haruna at Jambo, and a battle took place. The Umbatawa ran away, deserting Haruna. Yusufu killed and took many men. It is said that about seven hundred were killed. Afterwards Yusufu tried to stir up rebellion and was deprived of his office and had to remain in chagrin and poverty till he was penniless. Abdulahi turned the Sarkin Dawaki Abdu out of his office and with him Makama Gadodamasu, Chiroma Diko, Dan Iya Alabirra, Galadima Abdul-Kadiri, and Galadima Yusufu. Abdulahi killed the Alkali Kano Ahmedu Rufaiyi, and degraded Maaji Sulimanu, Maji Gajere, and San Kurmi Musa. He deprived Mallam Dogo of his office of Waziri. The number of people that he turned out of office was countless.

Hence the song—"Son of Ibrahim, a pick-axe to physic hard ground."

He sacked many towns. He made a new gate, the Kofan Fada. In his father's time it had been built up. He rebuilt the mosque and house of the Turaki Mainya early in his reign. They had been in ruins for many years. Im his time Soron Giwa was built. At Woso he met Dan Maji in war. It was towards evening when the battle was fought. Dan Maji retreated. If it had not been that the light failed he would have been killed. Abdulahi attacked Betu, but failed. Abdulahi used to have guns fired off when he mounted his horse, till it became a custom.

His chief men were: Sarkin Yaki, called Mallam Dogo, Mallam Isiaka, Mallam Garuba, Sarkin Gaiya, Mallam Abdu Ba-Danneji, Alhaji Nufu, his friend Mallam Masu, Tefida his son, Shamaki Naamu, Manassara, Jekada of Gerko, and Dan Tabshi. Mallam Ibrahim was his scribe, and was made Galadima. This man was afterwards turned out of office in the time of Mohammed Belo. Others were the Alkali Zengi and Alkali Sulimanu. Abdulahi went to Zaria and sat down at Afira, and then at Zungonaiya.

The Madawaki Ali of Zaria was in revolt against Sarkin Zaria. The Sarkin Kano made peace between them and returned home. In Abdulahi's time Salemma Berka became great. In the time of Mohammed Belo this man revolted and was degraded. In Abdulahi's time, too, the palace slaves became so great that they were like free men. They all rebelled in Mohammed Belo's time, but Allah helped Mohammed Belo to quell the rebellion.

There were many great captains of war in Abdulahi's time, men without fear—so many of them that they could not be enumerated, but a few may be mentioned: Sarkin Yaki, Mallam Dogo and his son Diiti, Jarumai Musa, Sarkin Bebeji Abubakr, Sarkin Rano Ali, Sarkin Gesu Osuman, Sarkin Ajura Jibbr.

In this reign Sarkin Damagaram Babba came as far as Jirima and sacked Garun Allah. Sarkin Guminel Abdu Jatau came to Pogolawa to attack it. Sarkin Maradi Dan Boskori came to Katsina. Abdulahi went to meet him. They met at Kusada, but did not fight. For this reason the meeting was called "Algish Bigish Zuru Yakin Zuru," for they looked at each other and went back. There was also a fight between Barafia Sarkin Maradi and Sarkin Kano at Bichi. Barafia ran away and Abdulahi took all the spoils. It is not known how many men were killed and slain.

We do not know much of what Abdulahi did in the early part of his reign. He ruled Kano 27 years and 8 days, and died at Karofi on his way to Sokoto.

— Kano Chronicle

Preceded by Usman Maje Ringim	Emir of Kano; 1855-1883	Succeeded by Muhammad Bello
