= Sulaimanu =

Suleimanu

Emir of Kano
- Reign: 1807–1819
- Predecessor: position established Muhammad Alwali (as Sarkin Kano)
- Successor: Ibrahim Dabo
- Dynasty: Mundubawa
- Father: Abahama
- Mother: Adama Modi

Sulaimanu (or Suleiman) was an Emir of Kano who reigned from 1807 to 1819.

== Biography in the Kano Chronicle ==
Below is a biography of Sulaimanu from Palmer's 1908 English translation of the Kano Chronicle.

The 44th Sarki was Sulimanu, son of Abahama, a Fulani. His mother's name was Adama Modi. When he became Sarkin Kano, the Fulani prevented him from entering the palace. He went into the house of Sarkin Dawaki's mother. One of the remaining Kanawa said to Sulimanu, "If you do not enter the Giddan Rimfa, you will not really be the Sarki of city and country."

When Sulimanu heard this he called the chief Fulani, but they refused to answer his summons, and said, "We will not come to you. You must come to us, though you be the Sarki. If you will come to Mallam Jibbrim's house we will assemble there."

Sulimanu went to Jibbrim's house and called them there. When they had assembled, he asked them and said, "Why do you prevent me entering the Giddan Rimfa?"

Mallam Jibbrim said, "If we enter the Habe's houses and we beget children, they will be like these Habes and do like them."

Sulimanu said nothing but set off to Shehu-Osuman Dan Hodio asking to be allowed to enter the Giddan Rimfa. Shehu Dan Hodio gave him a sword and a knife, and gave him leave to enter the Giddan Rimfa, telling him to kill all who opposed him. He entered the house, and lived there. All the Kano towns submitted to him, except Faggam, which he attacked. He took many spoils there. On his way back to Kano the chiefs of the Fulani said to him, "If you leave Faggam alone, it will revolt."

So he divided it into two, and returned home. In his time Dabo Dan Bazzo raised a revolt. He dared to look for a wife in Sokoto and was given one. Sarkin Kano said, "What do you mean by looking for a wife at Sokoto?"

So Dabo was caught and bound. His relations the Danbazzawa, however, came by night and cut his bonds, and set him free. He ran to Sokoto with Sulimanu following him. At Sokoto they both went before Dan Hodio. Dabo Dan Bazzo said, "I do not wish to marry your daughters, but I wish for a reconciliation between myself and your Sarki Sulimanu."

So a reconciliation was made and they returned to Kano. Sulimanu sent the Galadima Ibrahima to Zaria to make war. Ibrahima conquered Zaria and took many spoils. He returned to Kano. Sulimanu was angry because of the Galadima's success, and had sinister designs against him when he died himself without having an opportunity of carrying them out.

He ruled 13 years.

— Kano Chronicle

Preceded by Muhammad Alwali	Sarkin Kano; 1807-1819	Succeeded by Ibrahim Dabo
