= Ningi Chiefdom =

Autonomous state in West Africa (1847–1902)

The Ningi Chiefdom was a chiefdom in West Africa which existed from around 1847 to 1902 when it was defeated by the British. It was established initially following the Sokoto Caliphate Revolt, a non-Muslim group of mountaineers who throughout the 19th century showed great resistance to the Bauchi Emirate, Kano Emirate and Zazzau Emirates. One of the Ningi leaders who defeated the Kano Emirate was Gwarsum. He was later succeeded by his son Tunsuru and then his other son Garta.
