= Muhammad Tukur Bature =

Nigerian politician

Muhammad Tukur Bature (born in December 1938) is a Nigerian politician. He served as State Commissioner in Kaduna State. He was the Director of Administration at the Nigerian Airways and the Managing Director/Chief Executive Officer of the company. Bature was later appointed as the Assistant Secretary General, Airline Operators of Nigeria (AON). He was turbaned as Sarkin Kudun Katsina "District head of Danja".

== Early life ==
Bature was born in Danja, Katsina. He attended Quranic school, Bakori Elementary School, Katsina Middle School and St.Pauls College Wusasa Zaria in 1959. He attended Keffi Government College and Kings College Lagos for higher certificate (HSC/GCE ‘A’ Level). In 1961 he proceeded to London and enrolled with the Inns of Court of Law School, London and the Honorable society of the Inner Temple as a law student.

== Career ==
Bature joined the Northern Nigerian (ICSA) Civil Service in January 1967 as an administrative officer. He left in 1969 to join the management of Nigerian Airways and between 1976 and 1978 he was invited to serve in Kaduna as State Commissioner in Kaduna State. He became the Managing Director/Chief Executive Officer of the company until the army took over in January 1984. Later in August 1984, he retired from the company. He was turbaned as “Sarkin Kudun Katsina” District head of Danja in June 1992.

== Personal life ==
Bature is married and raised many children.

== Bibliography ==
- Garba, Muhammad Bawa (1993). Katsina State Pictorial and Historical Sketches. The First Twenty Five Years (1987-2012). Katsina: Katsina State. ISBN 978-978-939-489-0
