= Gidan Rumfa =

Palace in Kano, Nigeria

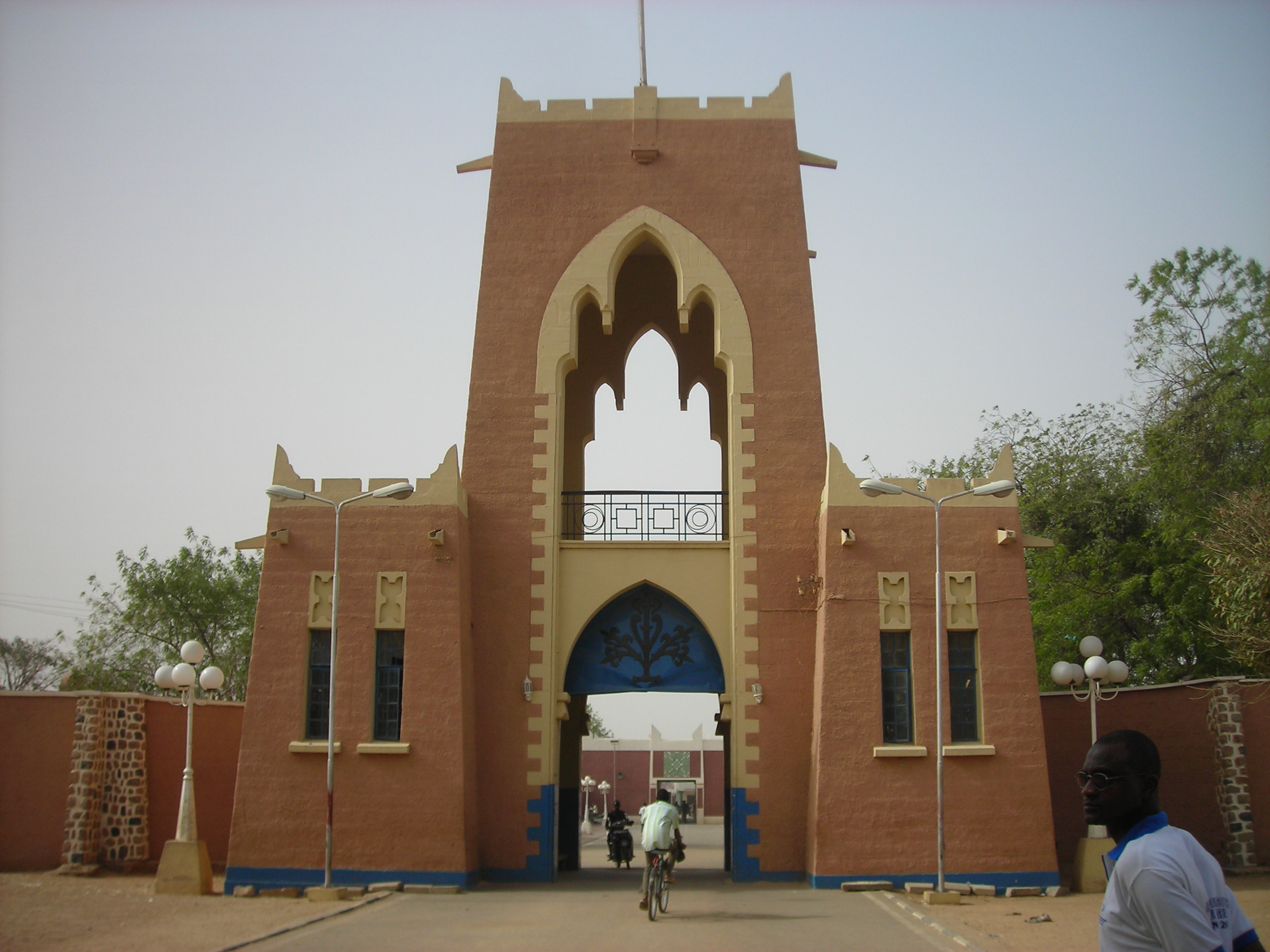
- The Kofar Kudu, one of the three gates to the palace, photographed in 2009

- Location within Nigeria
- Alternative names: Gidan Sarki

General information
- Location: Kano, Nigeria
- Coordinates: 11.9923°N 8.5160°E

The Gidan Rumfa, sometimes called the Gidan Sarki ("Emir's house"), is the palace of the Emir of Kano. Located in the city of Kano, Kano State, Nigeria, it was originally constructed in the late 15th century, with later transformations and additions made up to the 20th century. Since the reign of Rumfa, it has continuously been the residence of the traditional authority in Kano and was retained by the Fulani jihadists who took over traditional authority in Kano in the early 19th century. It currently has an area of 130,000 square metres (33 acres).

== History ==
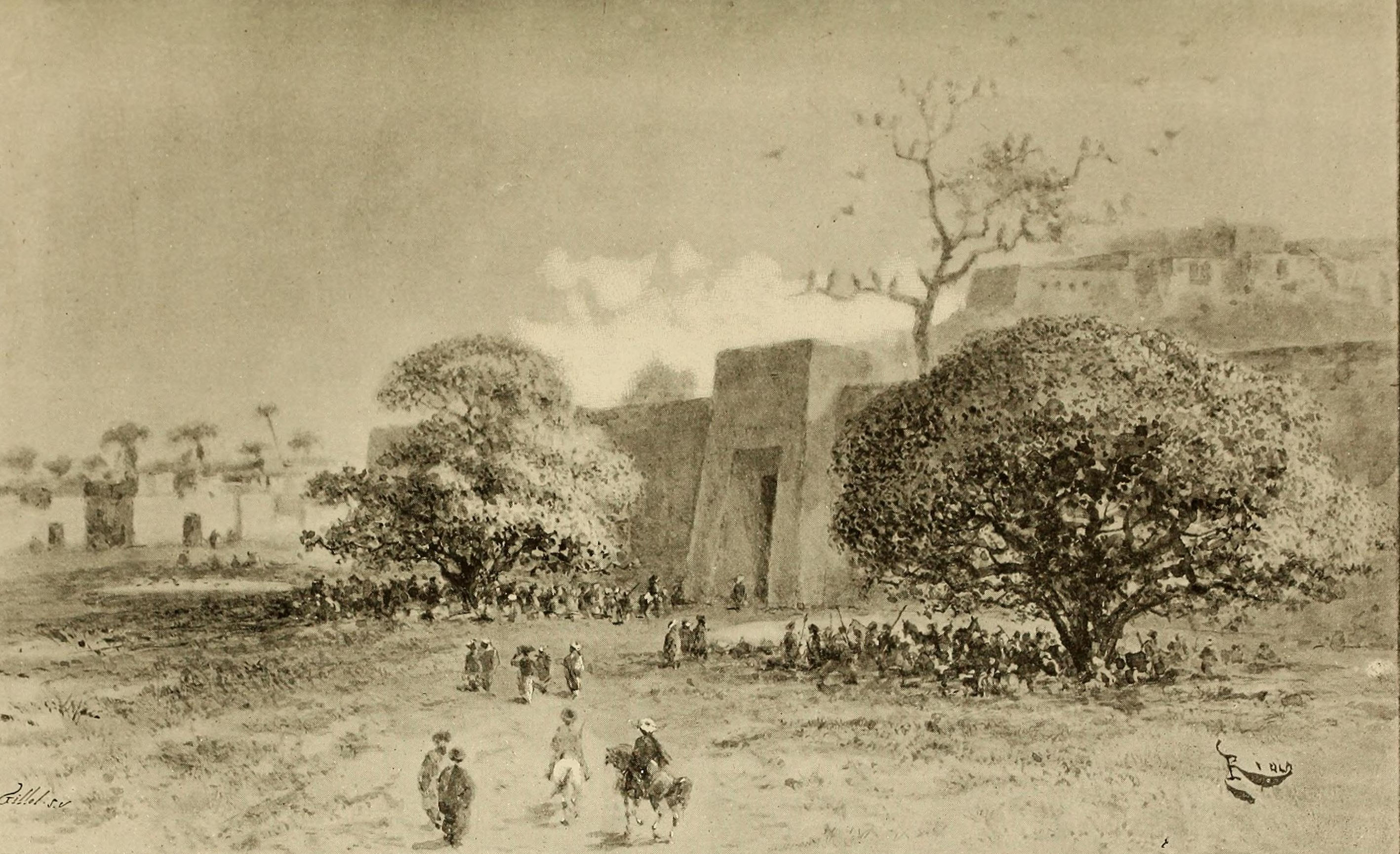
Gate to the palace (1890)

Gidan Rumfa was originally built in the late 15th century on the outskirts of the town of Kano. The new building extended the reach of the town and also led to the establishment of the Kurmi market.

== Architecture ==
The palace covers a space of about 13 hectares (33 acres) and its open plan design is surrounded by walls up to 4.6 m (15 ft) high. The structure is rectangular in shape and its landscape ecology can be divided into three classifications: open spaces, gardens and living quarters/built up areas. Structures within the living quarters and built up areas include the Kofar Kudu or Southern gate, offices, mosque, Soron ingila (English hall), royal courtrooms, a primary and secondary school and living quarters. The iconic Kofar Kudu gate was built by the Emir Abdullahi Maje Karofi in the second half of the 19th century.

== Today ==
Gidan Rumfa houses the Emir and his wives, children and aides. The resident population of the Emir's private quarters numbers up to 200, while more than a thousand individuals live within the structure. The space surrounding the structure is dominated by gardens.

== Sources ==
- Tanko, Momale (2014). Kano: Environment, Society and Development. London: Adonis & Abbey Publishers Ltd.
