= Aliyu Babba =

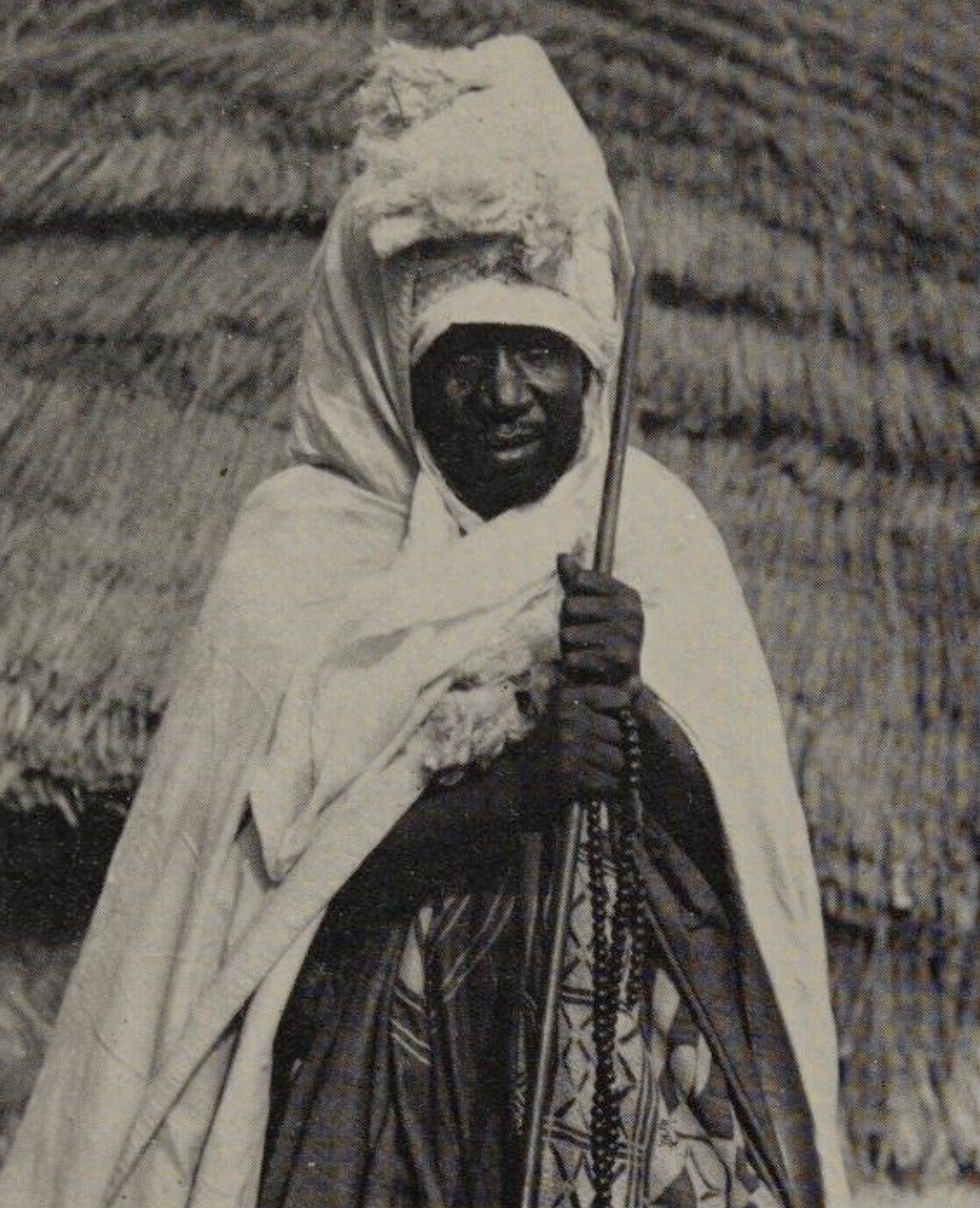
- Aliyu Babba after his capture in 1903

Emir of Kano
- Reign: 1894–1903
- Coronation: August 19, 1894
- Predecessor: Mohammed Tukur
- Successor: Muhammad Abbass
- Born: Kano
- Died: 1926; Lokoja, Northern Nigeria
- Burial: Lokoja, Northern Nigeria
- House: House of Dabo
- Father: Abdullahi Maje Karofi

Aliyu Ibn Abdullahi-Maje Karofi was an Emir of Kano, a state in what is now Northern Nigeria. Also known as Babba and Mai Sango- The Gun User. Emerging at the end of the Basasa, his reign was marked by a series of costly wars and fortification projects that heavily militarised the erstwhile commercial Emirate. His escapades as Emir of Kano were recorded in the official historical canon of the Kano Emirate, the Tarikh Al Kano. The ballad of Ali Zaki, commemorates his reign as the last Emir of Kano.

== Early life ==
The life of Aliyu unlike other sudanic princes at the time was one of a strict adherence to Tasswuf, according to the Tarikh al Kano, Aliyu was a strict adherent of the Qadariyyah Order and a gifted swordsman. At a young age he wrote the Rad al Jahla; a sufist text for initiates. In 1893, shortly after the death of Emir Muhammad Bello, Sultan Abdurrahman appointed Tukur the new Emir of Kano. Almost immediately, Aliyu's brother and reported confident Yusuf, led the remaining children of Abdullahi Maje Karofi in rebellion. This split within the House of Dabo initiated the 3rd Kano Civil War; The Basasa. The rebels left Kano for Takai and Aliyu assumed the unofficial role of Vazier, coordinating the various military formations of the Yusufawa

== Basasa ==
Aliyu reportedly distinguished himself at the field during the Basassa, the victories of his columns at Gogel and Utai placed him at an advantage when in 1894, during the Battle of Gaya; Yusuf was fatally wounded. The Sarkin-Dawakin-Tsakar-Gida Abbas and Dan-Makwayo Shehu also contenders to the throne, were forced to concede when at his death bed; Yusuf was informed of a plan by the then Caliph of Sokoto Abdurrahman Danyen Kasko to lead the Autumn Army on a punitive expedition against the Yusufawa, with Aliyu's mother being a sister to the Caliph; the coronation of Aliyu would presumably pacify Sokoto.

== Emir of Kano ==
On August 19, 1894, Aliyu Successfully led the Yusufawa in conquering the fort of Kano; Months later Mohammed Tukur was assassinated at Guri bringing an end to the Basasa.The peace was however short. After the readmission of Kano into the Sokoto Caliphate in 1896, a reinvigorated Borno sensing turmoil in the east of the Caliphate launched a daring campaign on Kano on three fronts. The Sultanate of Damagaram- a vassal state of borno, Maradi and Ningi opened simultaneous fronts in an attempt to overwhelm kano. Aliyu's defense of Kano using Explosives, Sango Muskets and other Ottoman weaponry earned him the titles Mai Sango and Zaki. His battles during this period elevated him to the rank of Kano's other warrior Kings and Emirs. The ballad of Ali Zaki; Wakar Ali Zaki, celebrating his escapades from Tygian Kano, immortalized his name and that of his courtiers like the Vazier- Ahmadu; Galadima-Mahmud, Madaki Kwairanga, Alkali-Suleman, Makama-Hamza and Sarkin-Bai- Abdussalam. Also during these campaigns, in an attempt to fortify the borders of the Emirate; Aliyu initiated a series of Ribat – Fort construction projects. Sumaila, Bunkure, Gezawa and many other stockades were elevated to the status of Ribats. These wars were not to seize until the French conquests of 1899 and the later incursions by Rabeh and Fadallah that diverted Bornoan attention from the Sokoto Caliphate.

== Defeat and capture ==
In 1903, while on a Homage visit to Sokoto, the British's Kano-Sokoto Expedition attacked Kano. It is still being debated as to whether Aliyu had been informed of the British attack before he left for Sokoto or Not. In February 1903, British forces captured Kano while Aliyu was away with the Emirate's large contingent elite cavalry. On receiving news of the fall of Kano at Sokoto, Aliyu and the Kano cavalry embarked on a march to retake the Emirate. After three encounters with the British at Gusau and Zamfara, in March 1903, the Kano cavalry was ambushed at Kwatarkwashi. In the ensuing battle, Vazier Ahmadu was killed and at some point before or after that, Aliyu took to flight in a Mahadist Hijira. With the defeat of the Kano cavalry, the Wambai of Kano – Abbass surrendered to the British while the remnant of the Kano Cavalry that returned to Sokoto was integrated into the Caliphal force. Months later, Aliyu was captured by the French in modern-day Niger Republic and handed over to the British.

== Exile and death ==
On his capture, Aliyu was exiled to Yola and then after a rebellion there to Lokoja, the capital of the new Northern Nigeria where he returned to his Tasswuff studies. He died there in 1926.
