= Osumanu =

- Sarkin Kano
- Reign: 1846-1855
- Predecessor: Ibrahim Dabo
- Successor: Abdullahi
Names
- Usman I Maje Ringim dan Dabo
- House: Dabo Dynasty
- Father: Ibrahim Dabo
- Mother: Shekara

Osumanu (also known as Usman I or Usman I Maje Ringim dan Dabo) was an Emir of Kano who reigned from 1846 to 1855.

== Biography in the Kano Chronicle ==
Below is a biography of Osumanu from Palmer's 1908 English translation of the Kano Chronicle.

The 46th Sarki was Osumanu, son of Dabo. His mother was Shekara. The first act of his reign was to build a house for Shekara at Tafassa with a big room the like of which was never seen before. Shekara was called "the mistress of the big room."

Osumanu was a learned and good man and generous. He was called "The skin of cold water."

The Galadima Abdulahi obtained in his time almost as much power as the Sarki, while Osuman was like his Waziri. There was no war in his time except with Hadeijia. He built a house at Gogel and had a farm there. In his time mallams obtained great honour—among them Mallam Ba-Abseni, and others. In Osumanu's time Sarkin Dussi Bello revolted, but the Sarki enticed him to Kano and deposed him. Highway robbers were very numerous because Osuman was so good-tempered and merciful. He could not bring himself to cut a man's hand off nor, because he was so pitiful, could he cut a robber's throat. He was called "Jatau rabba kaya."

There was no Sarki like him for generosity.

He ruled Kano 9 years and 10 months.

— Kano Chronicle

Preceded by Ibrahim Dabo	Emir of Kano; 1846-1855	Succeeded by Abdullahi
