= Tukur Jekada =

Nigerian politician

State Representative
- Constituency: Bakura

Personal details
- Died: May 31, 2020
- Occupation: Politician

Alhaji Tukur Jekada was a Nigerian politician and a member of the Zamfara State House of Assembly, representing the Bakura Constituency. He served as the Chairman of the House Committee on Local Government and Chieftaincy Affairs. He died on May 31, 2020, after a brief illness.
