= Muhammad Bello (emir) =

- Sarkin Kano
- Reign: 1883-1892
- Predecessor: Abdullahi
Names
- Muhammadu Bello dan Dabo
- House: Dabo Dynasty
- Father: Ibrahim Dabo
- Mother: Shekkara

Muhammad Bello was an Emir of Kano who reigned from 1883 to 1892.

== Biography in the Kano Chronicle ==
Below is a biography of Muhammad Bello from Palmer's 1908 English translation of the Kano Chronicle.

The 48th Sarki was Mohammed Belo, son of Ibrahim Dabo. His mother was Shekkara. He was a very generous Sarki.

He said to his friend Sarkin Fada Dan Gatuma, "You are Waziri Kano; I place in your hands the management of Kano."

The Sarkin Fada was unrivalled as a settler of disputes. Belo was like his Wazir, and Sarkin Fada was like Sarki. When Sarki Fada died, Mohammed Belo stretched out his legs because he saw that now he must become Sarki in earnest. He expelled the Galadima Ibrahim from his office and banished him to Funkui in Zaria, whence his name, "Galadima na Funkui."

Belo gave the post of Galadima to his son Tukr, and his son Zakari was made San Turaki. Another son Abubakr he made Chiroma in place of Chiroma Musa.

— Kano Chronicle

Preceded by Abdullahi	Emir of Kano; 1883-1892	Succeeded by Mohammed Tukur
