= Sokoto State House of Assembly =

Legislative arm of the government of Sokoto State of Nigeria

Sokoto State House of Assembly (SOHA)
- 10th Sokoto State House of Assembly

Type
- Type: Unicameral

Leadership
- Speaker: Hon. Tukur Bala Bodinga, APC
- Deputy Speaker: Hon. Kabiru Ibrahim Kware, APC
- Majority Leader: Bello Idris, PDP
- Minority Leader: Hon. Abubakar Magaji

Structure
- Seats: 30
- Political groups: Majority: APC (21); Minority: PDP (9)

Elections
- Last election: 2023
- Next election: 2027

Website
- https://sokoto-state-house-of-assembly-1qwm2.evlop.me/

The Sokoto State House of Assembly is the legislative arm of the government of Sokoto State of Nigeria. It is a unicameral legislature with 30 members.

The fundamental functions of the Assembly are to enact new laws, amend or repeal existing laws and oversight of the executive. Members of the assembly are elected for a term of four years concurrent with federal legislators (Senate and House of Representatives).
