= Mohammed Tukur =

Muhammad Tukur

Emir of Kano
- Reign: 1893– 19 August 1894
- Coronation: December 1893
- Predecessor: Muhammad Bello
- Successor: Aliyu Babba
- Born: After 1853
- Died: 16 March 1895; Gurin, Kano Emirate
- Burial: Gurin, Kano Emirate
- House: House of Dabo
- Father: Muhammad Bello

Galadima of Kano
- In office 1883–1892
- Monarch: Muhammad Bello
- Preceded by: Mallam Ibrahim

Muhammad Tukur (Arabic: محمد تقر بن محمد بل, romanized: Muḥammad Tuqur bin Muḥammad Bello; d. 1894) was Emir of Kano from 1893 until his death in 1894. Tukur presided over Kano during the Bassasa, a period of civil war that saw multiple claimants to the Kanoan throne.

== Early life ==
Tukur was appointed Galadima of Kano during the reign of his father, Mohammed Bello. During the Autumn expedition of 1890, Tukur's forces routed a rebellious Kebbi column at Arugungu and apparently in the process saved the life of the then Caliph of Sokoto, Abdurrahman (Danyen Kasko). In 1893, shortly after the death of Emir Muhammad Bello, Abdurrahman appointed Tukur the new Emir of Kano. Almost immediately, a faction of the House of Dabo under Yusuf bin Abdullahi Maje Karofi rebelled and left Kano for Takai.

== Basasa ==
At the outbreak of the Basasa a majority of the Kanoan Court were loyal to Tukur, The Madaki, Ibrahim Mallam; Makaman Kano Iliyasu; Sarkin Bai, Bashari Alhaji; Alkali, Modibo Salihu; Sarkin Gaya, Ibrahim Dabo and Sarkin Fulanin Dambatta were his most ardent supporters. The Chiroma of Kano, Turaki Zaki and the Sarkin Fulanin Dambatta were the first to engage the rebels at Gano then Gogel and Garko. Although they succeeded at killing yusuf at the battle of Gaya, their overall efforts to stem the rebellion proved futile and in August 1894, the rebels under the command of Aliyu Mai Sango (Their newly proclaimed Emir) captured the fort of Kano.

== Exile and death ==
On the Fall of Kano Tukur transferred his court to Kamri. Aliyu however continued to pursue the Tukurawa, on 16 March 1895, at an encounter at Guri, Tukur was assassinated by Barde Abdu Nagwangwazo. He was reportedly buried there.
