= Dunama (disambiguation) =

Dunama is a genus of moths.

Dunama may also refer to:

- Dunama I Umemi, mai of the Kanem–Bornu Empire in the 11th/12th century
- Dunama II Dibalemi, mai of the Kanem–Bornu Empire in the 13th century
- Dunama III, possible 14th century mai of the Kanem–Bornu Empire
- Dunama IV, mai of the Kanem–Bornu Empire in the early-15th century
- Dunama V Ahmad, mai of the Kanem–Bornu Empire in the mid-15th century
- Dunama VI Muhammad, mai of the Kanem–Bornu Empire in the mid-16th century
- Dunama VII Martemarambi, mai of the Kanem–Bornu Empire in the 17th and 18th centuries
- Dunama VIII Gana, mai of the Kanem–Bornu Empire in the mid-18th century
- Dunama IX Lefiami, mai of the Kanem–Bornu Empire from 1808–1811 and 1814–1817
