= 'Abd ar-Rahman of Bornu =

Shehu of Bornu (1853–1854)

ʽAbd ar-Rahman
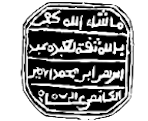
- ʽAbd ar-Rahman's official seal, 1853

Shehu of the Kanem–Bornu Empire
- Reign: 4 October 1853 – 3 September 1854
- Predecessor: Umar Kura
- Successor: Umar Kura
- Died: December 1854; Kukawa, Bornu
- Dynasty: al-Kanemi dynasty
- Father: Muhammad al-Amin al-Kanemi

ʽAbd ar-Rahman bin Muhammad al-Amin al-Kanemi (died December 1854), sometimes called Abdurrahman or Darman, was briefly the shehu (ruler) of the Kanem–Bornu Empire from 1853 to 1854. He was the son of shehu Muhammad al-Amin al-Kanemi, the founder of the al-Kanemi dynasty, and the younger brother of shehu Umar Kura. A skilled military commander, ʽAbd ar-Rahman played an important role in defending Bornu against external threats, including an 1846 invasion by the Wadai Sultanate, as well as an in the empire's expansion.

ʽAbd ar-Rahman's reputation for cruelty and ambition, as well as his rivalry with the waziri (vizier) al-Hajj Bashir, led to deep divisions at the imperial court in Kukawa. ʽAbd ar-Rahman deposed his half-brother Umar Kura in a coup d'état and ruled for less than a year before being overthrown and executed.

== Under Umar Kura ==
=== Mai's revolt ===
ʽAbd ar-Rahman was the son of Muhammad al-Amin al-Kanemi, the first shehu of Bornu. He was reputed for his bravery and military leadership. During the reign of his half-brother, Umar Kura, who succeeded their father as shehu in 1837, ʽAbd ar-Rahman became one of the most powerful men in Bornu. Umar frequently disregarded his council and came to rely heavily on the advice of Kachella Bilal, the leading slave-general.

Not much is known of Umar's first nine years as shehu. However, a major development was the ongoing power struggle between the mais of Bornu, the de jure rulers, and the shehus, who exercised actual authority over the empire. Following the death of Muhammad al-Kanemi, mai Ibrahim IV Lefiami ordered the new shehu, Umar, to travel to Kafela to pledge his allegiance. Umar refused, instead demanding that the mai come to him in Kukawa. Ibrahim immediately obeyed and traveled to Kukawa to swear allegiance. Umar, angered with Ibrahim's initial hesitation, reduced the mai's subsidy, a crucial source of his income.

After the humiliation he suffered at Kukawa, mai Ibrahim began preparing to reclaim his authority and remove the shehus from power. However, it was not until 1846 that he was able to gather enough support to execute his plans. He secured the backing of the Wadai Sultanate, a powerful neighboring state and historical rival of Bornu. Seizing the opportunity while ʽAbd ar-Rahman was away on a military expedition against the Sultanate of Damagaram, the Wadai forces launched an invasion to liberate the mai. The Wadai army had already advanced deep into Bornu territory before shehu Umar became aware of Ibrahim's plans. In response, Umar acted quickly, first imprisoning Ibrahim before gathering his remaining troops to confront the advancing forces.

The two armies clashed near the town of Kousséri in a fierce and bloody battle. Despite a determined defense, the Bornu forces suffered a devastating defeat and were forced to retreat, with several important leaders killed in combat. Upon returning to Kukawa, Umar executed mai Ibrahim and then fled northwest to join ʽAbd ar-Rahman. Meanwhile, the Wadai army continued its advance, pillaging settlements along the way. Upon reaching Kukawa, they installed a new mai, Ali V, a son of Ibrahim. However, upon learning of shehu Umar and ʽAbd ar-Rahman's approach, the Wadai forces retreated, leaving the newly appointed mai with only a small group of loyal supporters.

The two sides met at Minarge, near the Yobe River, where a brief battle ensued. The battle ended with the death of Ali and many of his followers. In the aftermath, Umar ordered the decimation of Ali's family and the destruction of Kafela. With no remaining challengers, he consolidated power and became the sole ruler of Bornu.

=== Power struggle ===
ʽAbd ar-Rahman remained one of shehu Umar's most effective commanders and trusted advisors. His military prowess was instrumental in organising and leading Bornu's army, and his recent success in defending against the Wadai invasion further improved his reputation, especially in Kukawa. However, within the shehu's court, he was regarded as a capricious and ruthless figure. German explorer Heinrich Barth, who met ʽAbd ar-Rahman during his stay in Kukawa in 1851, described him as a:

good soldier but a man of very loose and violent character. When a youth he had committed all sorts of violence and injustice, carrying off young brides by force to indulge his passions; he was besides, a man of little intelligence. Being but a few months younger than Omar, he thought himself equally entitled to the succession; and if once admitted into a high position in the empire, he might be expected to abuse his influence on the very first opportunity.

ʽAbd ar-Rahman also gained a reputation for treachery. On one occasion, after a difficult siege at Gujba, the town was on the brink of surrender. Gujba's leader, Mai Annur, secretly met withʽAbd ar-Rahman at his camp and proposed terms: the town would capitulate and offer all its horses, cattle, and able-bodied women and slaves as spoils, on the condition that his own life be spared and the townspeople allowed to retain their remaining food supplies. ʽAbd ar-Rahman agreed to the terms and swore an oath on the Qur'an that he would not allow the shehu to harm Annur. When Umar learned of Gujba's surrender, he was elated and ordered the occupation of the city. As a reward for facilitating the capitulation, he honoured ʽAbd ar-Rahman. However, soon after, Umar ordered Annur's execution. Despite his sworn oath, ʽAbd ar-Rahman raised no objections and allowed the execution to be carried out.

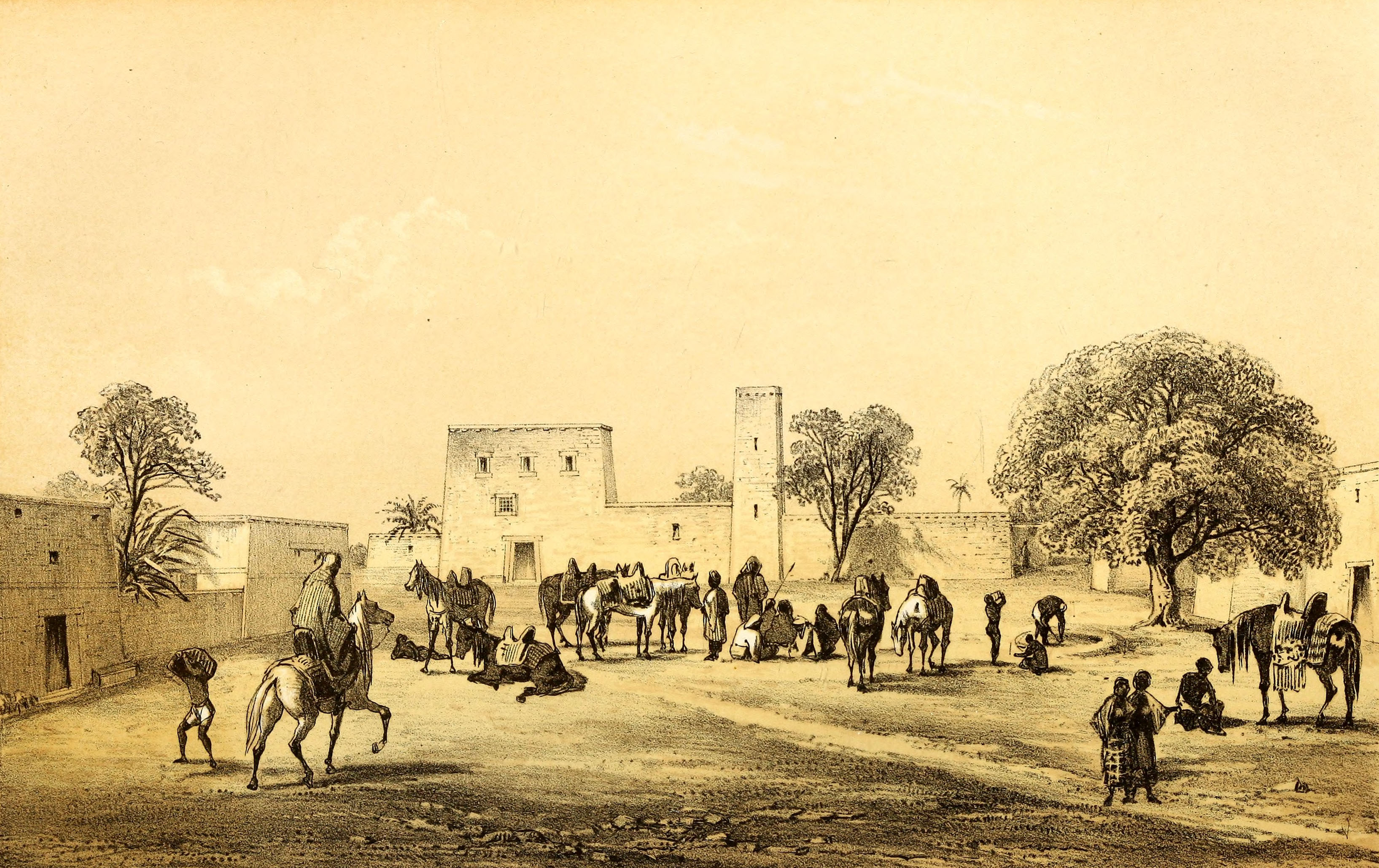
The palace of the shehu in Kukawa (1857)

Following the Wadai invasion,ʽAbd ar-Rahman's influence over shehu Umar began to decline as the shehu increasingly relied on his longtime confidant, al-Hajj Bashir. When Mallam Tirab was killed at Kousséri by the Wadai army, his eldest son, Bashir, succeeded him on the shehu's council and quickly became Umar's most trusted advisor. Eventually, Bashir was appointed waziri, or first minister, further solidifying his authority within the empire.

When the Bornu army retook Kukawa and defeated the mai's remaining forces, Umar rewarded Bashir with the command to plunder and destroy Kafela which was a privilege that ʽAbd ar-Rahman had expected for himself as a reward for his role in the campaign. Umar, however, feared that allowing his brother to accumulate such immense wealth would embolden him and pose a threat to his own position as shehu. Enraged by what he saw as a betrayal, ʽAbd ar-Rahman vowed never to serve his brother again.

ʽAbd ar-Rahman soon became one of Umar's most vocal critics. Despite his reputation for cruelty and treachery, he gained popularity among the growing opposition to the shehu which was largely due to widespread resentment toward al-Hajj Bashir. The Waziri's "covetousness" and "injudicious use of his almost unlimited power" alienated many in Kukawa. The shehu's courtiers despised Bashir, believing that their own paths to influence and wealth were obstructed by this single individual.

=== Revolt against the shehu ===
The rivalry between ʽAbd ar-Rahman and waziri Bashir simmered for some time before finally erupting into open conflict in November 1853. By then, ʽAbd ar-Rahman had secured the support of a significant faction of discontented courtiers who were eager to rid themselves of Bashir, even if it meant deposing shehu Umar. Sensing the rising tensions in Kukawa, Umar imposed a strict curfew on the city, which was mostly populated by his courtiers and their families. The task of enforcing the curfew fell to Laminu Njitiya, Bashir's wakil (chief assistant), who led a small detachment of the waziri's slaves and followers. When some of ʽAbd ar-Rahman's supporters defied the shehu's orders, a skirmish broke out, during which Njitiya suffered a broken hand.

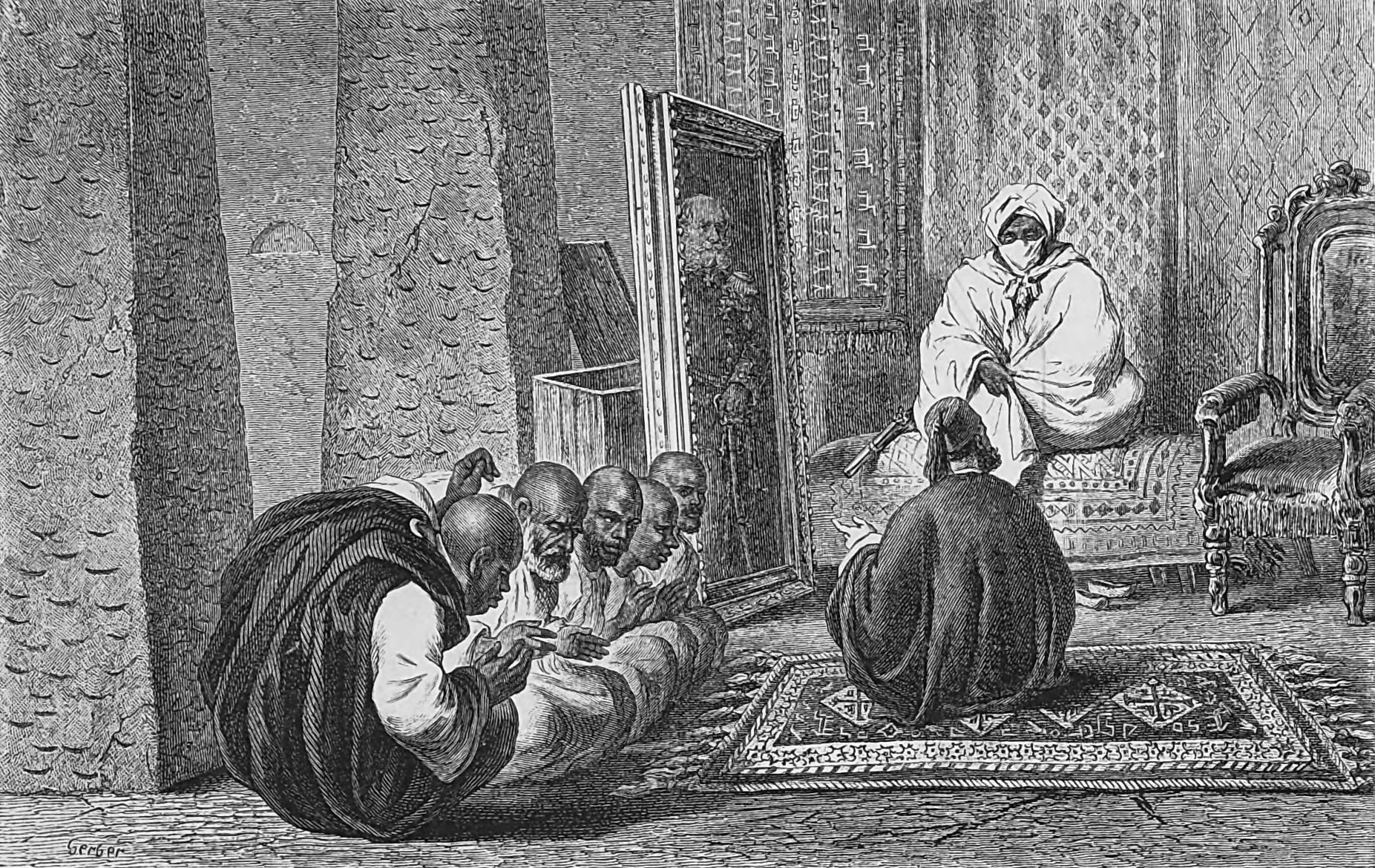
Shehu Umar receives German explorer Gustav Nachtigal in 1870

The next day, Umar convened the court, wearing the red robe reserved for occasions of punishment. As ʽAbd ar-Rahman entered, he deliberately walked across the room until he stood directly opposite his brother, then removed his shoes, a serious breach of etiquette. After a long silence, Umar finally spoke: 'Who is shehu?' ʽAbd ar-Rahman answered, 'You are.' Umar then declared 'Then think about what you have done. You have broken the hand of Laminu, my representative; therefore, you have broken my hand.' To this, ʽAbd ar-Rahman replied 'Since the matter is between you and me, let my word be worth more than that of al-Hajj Bashir.' The waziri immediately interjected, shouting, 'Would a prince like you be shehu?' Offended, ʽAbd ar-Rahman rose and stormed out of the room, accompanied by the chants and praises of his supporters, who hailed him with the praise-names and titles of shehu.

Following this confrontation, ʽAbd ar-Rahman and his followers departed from Kukawa and headed toward Damaturu, while Umar and Bashir pursued them. However, Bashir soon realised they were at a disadvantage against ʽAbd ar-Rahman and quickly returned to Kukawa to gather his possessions before fleeing eastward toward the River Shari. Recognising the futility of resistance, Umar ultimately conceded to his brother's will and abdicated the throne.

== Reign ==
ʽAbd ar-Rahman was quickly installed as shehu and allowed Umar to remain in Kukawa unharmed. Despite the coup, the transition of power had involved little bloodshed. This was largely because many of Bornu's leaders believed a change in leadership was necessary. ʽAbd ar-Rahman replaced all of Umar's advisors with his own loyalists and began killing the remaining agents of Bashir, who were stationed across Bornu.

When news reached the new shehu that al-Hajj Bashir and Mallam Muhammad, another close adviser of Umar, had been captured in a Shuwa village on the banks of the Chari, he sent his younger brother, Bukar, to deliver a message. Bukar assured them that the shehu had sworn an oath on the Qur'an that they would not be harmed if they returned to Kukawa. Bashir initially refused, dismissing ʽAbd ar-Rahman's oath as worthless. However, he was eventually persuaded by Mallam Muhammad, Bukar's son-in-law. Mallam Muhammad trusted ʽAbd ar-Rahman's sincerity and argued that, as Muslims, they were bound to accept the shehu's guarantee in good faith.

Upon their arrival in Kukawa, Bashir was seized by the shehu's slaves, dragged from the council chamber, and strangled to death. Bukar reportedly reacted with outrage, demanding that ʽAbd ar-Rahman execute him as well. The shehu was prepared to do so but was forcibly restrained by the other princes. Mallam Muhammad was spared, though he was removed from his position as Chief Qadi.

Disillusionment with ʽAbd ar-Rahman set in quickly. The courtiers who had once opposed Umar now found ʽAbd ar-Rahman's tyrannical rule intolerable and began reconsidering their support. In their eyes, Umar's greatest weakness had been his reliance on al-Hajj Bashir, who was now dead and no longer a threat. Soon even ʽAbd ar-Rahman's own slaves secretly began expressing support for Umar's return to power.

== Death ==
In early September 1854, following a brief confrontation and skirmish in the streets of Kukawa, Umar reclaimed the throne as shehu of Bornu. ʽAbd ar-Rahman's closest advisers, Kachella Ali Dendal and al-Hajj Rufai, were killed during the fighting. Although ʽAbd ar-Rahman managed to escape the city unharmed, he later returned and was subsequently put to death "when it became evident that his political ambitions had not diminished". His execution likely took place in December 1854.
