= Dunama VIII Gana =

Mai of the Kanem–Bornu Empire
- Reign: 18th century (2–3 years) c. 1747–1750 (Note: Different king lists (girgams) and chronicles translated in the 19th–20th centuries give Dunama slightly different regnal lengths: 2 years (Urvoy), 2 years and 7 months (Barth), or 3 years (Palmer, Landeroin, Nachtigal). As a result of this, and due to different calculations for other mais, various dates have been given for his reign, including 1752–1755 (Barth), 1747–1750 (Palmer), 1751–1753 (Urvoy), 1742–1745 (Landeroin), and 1746–1749 (Nachtigal). Cohen (1966) considered a reign of two years to be most likely. Bosworth (2012) followed Palmer and dated Dunama's reign to 1747–1750.)
- Predecessor: Muhammad VIII Ergama
- Successor: Ali IV Kalirgima
- Died: c. 1750; Ngazargamu, Bornu
- Dynasty: Sayfawa dynasty
- Father: Muhammad VIII Ergama (Note: Every author other than Richmond Palmer agrees that Dunama was Muhammad VIII Ergama's son. Palmer instead names his father as Aman.)
- Mother: Lefiya

Dunama VIII (Note: Some chronologies of Kanem–Bornu rulers omit the 14th-century Dunama III, lowering the regnal numbers of later rulers of this name. This ruler is then considered Dunama VII.) (Dunama bin Muḥammad), called Dunama Gana (Note: Also spelled Dunama Ghana.) and Dunama Sr'ir, was mai (ruler) of the Kanem–Bornu Empire in the mid-18th century, ruling approximately 1747–1750.

== Life ==
Dunama VIII was a son of mai Muhammad VIII Ergama, who he succeeded as mai in the mid-18th century. A girgam translated by Richmond Palmer states that Dunama's mother was "Lefiya, the daughter of Dunama". (Note: It is not clear who this Dunama (Lefiya's father) is meant to be, or if Dunama VIII is intended to be presented as the result of an incestuous relationship (i.e. if mais Dunama VII Martemarambi or Hamdan Dunamami, sometimes called Dunama, are meant). Palmer's girgam does not name Dunama VIII's father so may also present an alternative familial affiliation for the ruler.) According to the German explorer Heinrich Barth, who visited Bornu in the 1850s (about a century after Dunama's reign), Dunama was young at the time of his accession. The nickname Gana, associated with Dunama, means "small one", "the younger", or "the little". There was a very severe famine in Dunama's reign.

Dunama's rule was short, lasting only two or three years. He died at Ngazargamu and was succeeded as mai by his cousin Ali IV Kalirgima.
