= Muhammad IX Ngileruma =

Mai of the Kanem–Bornu Empire
- Reign: 1811–1814
- Predecessor: Dunama IX Lefiami
- Successor: Dunama IX Lefiami
- Burial: "Balangwa"
- Dynasty: Sayfawa dynasty
- Father: Ali IV Kalirgima
- Mother: Amina

Muhammad IX (Note: Some chronologies of Kanem–Bornu rulers omit the 14th-century Muhammad II Manza, lowering the regnal numbers of later rulers of this name. This ruler is then considered Muhammad VIII.) (Muḥammad bin ʿAlī bin Ḥamdūn), called Muhammad Ngileruma, was the mai (ruler) of the Kanem–Bornu Empire in 1811–1814. Muhammad Ngileruma came to power after his nephew Dunama IX Lefiami was deposed in a palace revolt. Little is known of political developments in his reign, though he is credited with founding Kafela as a new imperial capital. Muhammad Ngileruma was deposed without a fight in 1814 and Dunama was restored to the throne.

== Life ==
Muhammad Ngileruma was a son of mai Ali IV Kalirgima (r. 1750–1791). Muhammad's mother was named Amina, "the daughter of Talba".

By 1811, the reign of Muhammad's nephew Dunama IX Lefiami had inspired considerable discontent among the courtiers and nobility of the empire. Dunama had failed to deal with the invasion of the empire in the Fula jihads, with leadership instead mainly falling on the scholar and religious leader Muhammad al-Amin al-Kanemi. Al-Kanemi's growing influence and power as a result of his victories also represented a threat to the empire's establishment.

In 1811, Dunama was deposed in a palace revolt and replaced as mai with Muhammad Ngileruma. The conspirators argued that they were acting justly by pointing to the fact that Dunama had become mai with the abdication of his father, Ahmad Alimi, and had thus irregularly acceded to the position while his predecessor was still alive. The conspirators expected Muhammad Ngileruma to return the empire to the state of peace and security it had enjoyed prior to the Fula jihads, and to contain the ambitions of al-Kanemi. Muhammad Ngileruma does not appear to have opposed al-Kanemi, however, instead employing him and his warriors as the empire's defense force. A permanent capital was re-established at Kafela, close to al-Kanemi's capital at Ngurno. The previous capital, Ngazargamu, had been destroyed in the Fula jihads. Little is known of the political developments in Muhammad Ngileruma's reign, though he appears to have held his position only tenuously as different factions in Kafela and Ngurno struggled for influence.

Muhammad Ngileruma's reign came to an end after just three years, when al-Kanemi supported the restoration of Dunama IX. The mai had, like Dunama, failed to lead the resistance against the Fulani. Muhammad Ngileruma was also a man of deep religious convictions, and had imposed unpopular legal strictures at court. With the pretext of preparing another campaign against the Fulani, al-Kanemi summoned leading courtiers to Ngurno. The courtiers who did not support Dunama were outnumbered and forced to comply. Upon hearing of the conspiracy, Muhammad Ngileruma left Kafela quietly without a fight. Al-Kanemi, Dunama, and their supporters then rode to Kafela and again invested Dunama as mai. Muhammad died some time later and was reportedly buried at a site called Balangwa.
