= Ali IV Kalirgima =

Mai of the Kanem–Bornu Empire
- Reign: 18th century (40–46 years) c. 1750–1791 (Note: Different king lists (girgams) and chronicles translated in the 19th–20th centuries give Ali IV slightly different regnal lengths: 40 years (Barth, Urvoy), 41 years (Palmer), 44 years (Landeroin), or 46 years (Nachtigal). As a result of this, and due to different calculations for other mais, various dates have been given for his reign, including 1755–1793 (Barth), 1750–1791 (Palmer), 1753–1793 (Urvoy), 1745–1791 (Landeroin), and 1749–1793 (Nachtigal). Ronald Cohen, writing in 1966, found a reign of about 40 years, beginning c. 1750, to be the most likely option. Bosworth (2012) similarly dates Ali's reign to 1750–1791.)
- Predecessor: Dunama VIII Gana
- Successor: Ahmad Alimi
- Died: 1791; Ngazargamu, Bornu (?)
- Spouse: Amina
- Issue: Ahmad Alimi; Muhammad IX Ngileruma
- Dynasty: Sayfawa dynasty
- Father: Hamdan Dunamami (Note: Ali IV is also recorded as ʿAlī bin al-Ḥājj Dunama; his father Hamdan is called Dunama in some sources.)
- Mother: Fanna

Ali IV (ʿAlī bin Ḥamdūn), called Ali Kalirgima, (Note: "Ali, lord of Kalirgi") Ali Gulmi, (Note: "Ali, lord of Gulu") Ali Dunamami, (Note: "Ali, son of Dunama" (an alternate name sometimes used for Ali's father Hamdan)) and Ali Fannami, (Note: "Ali, son of Fanna") was mai (ruler) of the Kanem–Bornu Empire in the second half of the 18th century, ruling approximately 1750–1791. Ali is remembered for a series of unsuccessful wars against the Mandara Kingdom to the southwest, which greatly weakened the empire's armies.

== Life ==
Ali IV was a son of mai Hamdan Dunamami and succeeded his cousin Dunama VIII Gana as mai in the mid-18th century, c. 1750. Ali's mother was named Fanna, described as "princess of the lands of Wurga". According to the German explorer Heinrich Barth, who visited Bornu in the 1850s, the royal chronicles of the empire praised Ali as a "most excellent prince", though this seems to have been "only from a monkish point of view". Other accounts praise Ali as a warrior, giving him epithets such as the "fierce lion", "bravest of the princes", and "terror of the bush". Further epithets sometimes applied to Ali include "the gold mine" and the "son of happiness".

Ali's reign saw repeated conflicts with the Mandara Kingdom, located to the southwest of Bornu. Mandara and the densely populated pagan lands that surrounded the kingdom was attractive as an area for slave raids, an important factor in Bornu economics and politics. Ali led several military campaigns against Mandara. Most of Ali's wars were unsuccessful. In one campaign, Ali was wounded and most of his army was killed. In 1781, an army from the Mandara Kingdom invaded Bornu itself and killed many of the empire's soldiers. The people of Bornu later attributed Ali's unsuccessful campaigns against Mandara as the major cause of the empire's weakness under Ali's successors, particularly against the Fula jihads that swept through the region shortly after Ali's death. The best parts of the Bornuan army had reportedly been slain by the forces of the Mandara Kingdom. According to Barth's chronicle, Ali also led several military expeditions against the Bade people to the west of Bornu.

Simon Lucas, an English diplomat contemporary with Ali who traveled to Libya, claimed that Ali was the father of three hundred male children. Ali died in 1791 (Note: The sources agree that Ahmad Alimi ruled for 17 years. Ahmad's reign ended with his abdication in the aftermath of the fall of Ngazargamu in 1808.) and was succeeded as mai by his son Ahmad Alimi. It is unclear where Ali died and where he was buried. A girgam (regnal list) translated by Richmond Palmer in 1912 states that he was buried "in the camp built with bricks" whereas another girgam translated by Palmer in 1926 states that Ali died at Ngazargamu.

== Writings of Muhammad al-Tahir ==
Sometime during his reign, Ali became close with the Fulani scholar Sheikh Muhammad al-Tahir (also known as Dahiru Feroma). When al-Tahir arrived at the Bornu capital Ngazargamu, he was said to have been advised by another respected scholar Shehu Ajirami (Muhammad bin al-Hajj Abd al-Rahman) "not to indulge himself in the offices of the dynasty such as imam, alkali, or the council."

Despite accepting Ajirami's advice, al-Tahir became a close confidant of mai Ali, which reportedly led to some jealousy among the other courtiers. There are several stories regarding this jealousy. In one account, a man arrested by the mai was defended by al-Tahir but when Ali refused to release him, the man disappeared. The court official Shettima Magaramma then accused al-Tahir of using magical charms to spirit the man away in a gourd. Al-Tahir then replied with the verse:

Every slanderer, when he is examined,
Will be found to be the son of a whore.

According to another:

Mainin Kunendi would never shake the hand of Shehu Tahr, so one day Shehu Tahr asked the Mai about this. "You are the leader of all the country and you shake my hand. Why does Mainin Kunendi refuse?" The Mai put this question to Mainin Kunendi, saying, "Every Mai has need of an alkali, an imam, one Shehu or learned man, and one master of the Qur'an. Shehu Tahr is my learned man, so why don't you shake his hand?" Mainin Kunendi replied, "You have need of him and he has need of you. You want to use his magical powers, and he wants your throne, but I need nothing from him".

Al-Tahir's writings suggest that he advised Ali on religious matters, encouraged him in his military campaigns, and wrote eulogies to him as a pious Muslim. One of his most famous works was a poem he composed for the mai called Fané Fané ("Listen, Listen" in Kanuri), an allusion to gossip-mongering. In it, al-Tahir condemned certain unnamed courtiers for their slander and rumour-mongering. An excerpt reads:

Truly Mai Ali is a high-minded man, unimpaired in his uprightness.
If a slanderer comes to him with a libelous and malignant report,
He shuts his eyes and closes his ears in order to shun such unkind behaviour.
He weighs their remarks on the balance of his innermost heart with careful consideration.
He weighs the truth upon a correct and trustworthy scale.
Then he discards all that which is uncouth,
And he ostracizes the slanderer as blameworthy, even as one banished in nakedness.
He never ceases to be guided by the Book in every matter.

During the 19th century Sokoto jihad, Fané Fané was used as justification for the jihad in Bornu by the jihadist commander and intellectual Muhammed Bello. Bello interpreted the poem as evidence that al-Tahir was an oppressed scholar who faced difficulties at court resulting from his defense of Islam against an unbelieving tyrant. However, historian Louis Brenner argues that this reading misrepresents the poem. Instead, he notes that a broader reading of it would strongly suggest another interpretation: "of a religious scholar who was profoundly implicated in court politics." According to Brenner, al-Tahir consistently viewed Ali as an upstanding Muslim ruler, and much of his poems were composed "to support the policies and the person of Mai Ali."
