= Muhammad al-Amin al-Kanemi =

Islamic religious scholar and political leader (1776–1837)

Shehu Muhammad al-Amin al-Kanemi
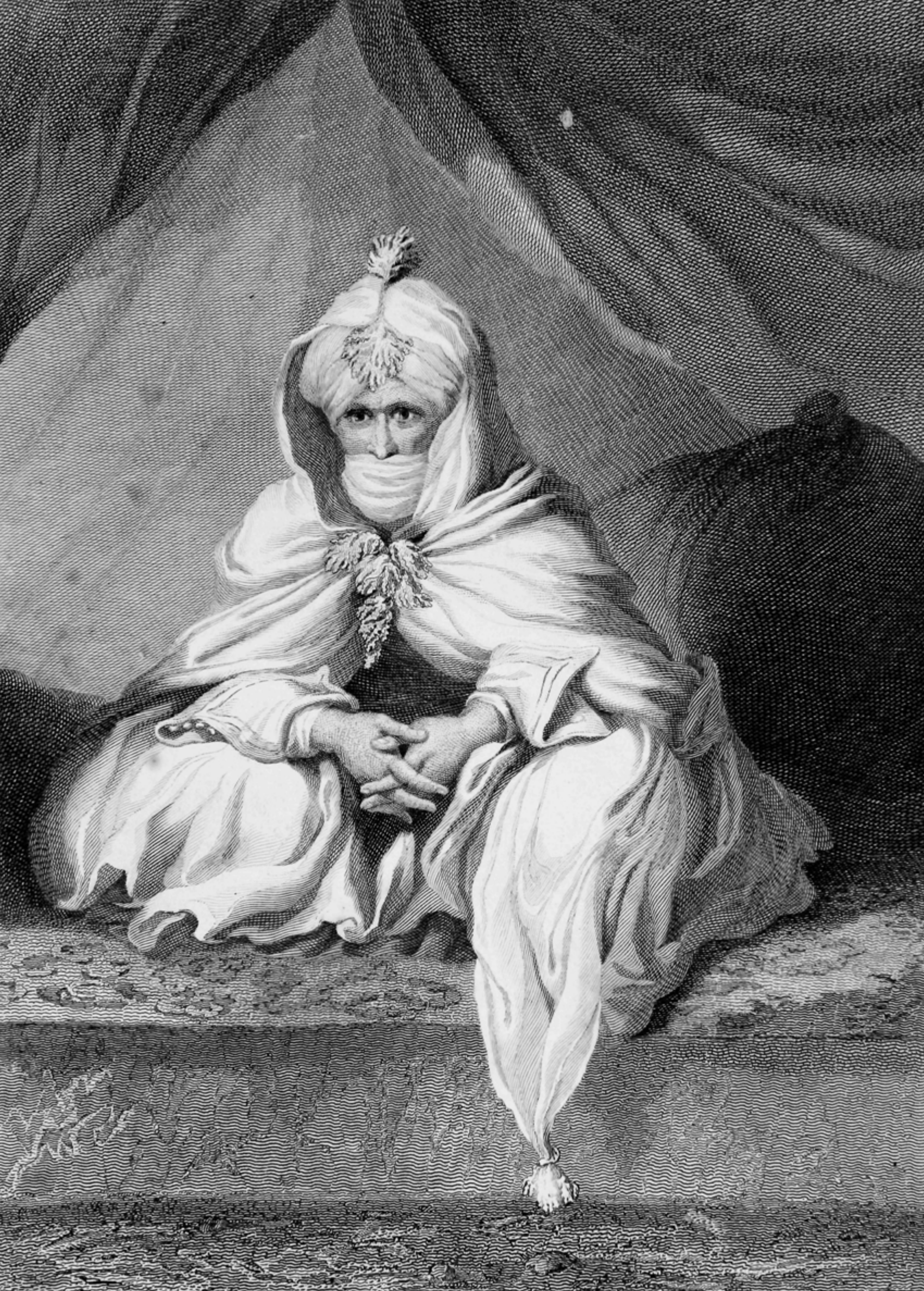
- "Alameen Ben Mohammed El Kanemy" by engraver Edward Francis Finden in Dixon Denham's memoir of his travel to Bornu, Narrative of travels and discoveries in Northern and Central Africa, in the years 1822, 1823, and 1824. Vol I Fontpiece, (1826)

Shehu of the Kanem–Bornu Empire
- In office 1809 – 8 June 1837
- Monarchs: Dunama IX Lefiami; Muhammad IX Ngileruma; Dunama IX Lefiami (restored); Ibrahim IV Lefiami
- Preceded by: Position established
- Succeeded by: Umar Kura

Personal details
- Born: Muhammad bin Muhammad Ninka; 1776 Murzuk
- Died: 8 June 1837 (aged 60–61) Kukawa
- Resting place: Kukawa, Borno State, Nigeria
- Children: Umar Kura: ʽAbd ar-Rahman; Salih; Abubakar

Religious life
- Religion: Islam
- Denomination: Sunni
- Jurisprudence: Maliki
- Tariqa: Junaidi
- Creed: Ash'ari

Muhammad al-Amin al-Kanemi (Arabic: محمد الأمين بن محمد الكانمي, romanized: Muḥammad al-Amīn bin Muḥammad al-Kānamī; 1776 – 8 June 1837), also known by the nickname Laminu, was an Islamic scholar and teacher, and a religious, military, and political leader who was instrumental in saving the Kanem–Bornu Empire during the Fula jihads in the early 19th century.

As a result of his efforts, the ruler of the Kanem–Bornu Empire, mai Dunama IX Lefiami, rewarded al-Kanemi with unprecedented power which allowed al-Kanemi to eventually supplant the ruling Sayfawa dynasty as the de facto ruler of the empire. He took the new title of shehu ("sheikh") and established the town of Kukawa as his seat. Under al-Kanemi's son Umar Kura, the mais were later deposed and the al-Kanemi dynasty transitioned into de jure monarchs.

== Early life and career ==
al-Kanemi was born in Murzuk in 1776. His father, Muhammad Ninka, was a well-known local Kanembu mallam ('Islamic teacher') from Fahi, a village near Mao in the Kanem region. His mother was the daughter of a wealthy Arab trader from Fun. al-Kanemi spent much of his early years in Murzuk, where he was taught the Qur'an. To further his studies, he travelled to other places, including Tripoli, to study under various scholars.

In the 1790s, al-Kanemi accompanied his father on a pilgrimage to Mecca. His father died in Medina during this pilgrimage. al-Kanemi stayed in the Middle East for about a decade, furthering his religious studies. On his way back to Murzuk and Kanem, he stayed in Ngala with his first wife, Yamba, and their son, Salih. Later, he was joined by two Shuwa Arab mallams, Muhammad Tirab of Baghirmi and Ibrahim Wadaima of Wadai, whom he had met during his travels. In Ngala, he quickly amassed a large number of students and further increased his influence by marrying a daughter of the mai (ruler) of Ngala.

== Fula jihad in Bornu ==
=== Outbreak of hostilities ===
While al-Kanemi was still in Ngala, he heard of the Sokoto jihad, which was launched in 1804 in Hausaland and reached Bornu by 1807. The movement was led by Usman dan Fodio, a Fulani preacher and scholar who aimed to reform Islam in Hausaland.

In c. 1807, Fula people in Daura revolted against the local governor and swore allegiance to Usman dan Fodio. The mai (monarch) of Bornu, Ahmad Alimi, sent assistance to Daura, attacked the rebels, and ordered an anti-Fula campaign throughout the state. Ahmad then began a correspondence with Usman dan Fodio and his son Muhammed Bello, inquiring of the cause of the attacks. Ahmad stated that his people were Muslim, that he considered himself to be the Commander of the Faithful in Bornu, and that the attacks were thus unjust. Usman replied that he had not known of the conflict in Daura and invited the mai to join him in their struggle. Ahmad refused since the Fulani had engaged in hostility against him and his people.

Despite initial victories against the Fulani, the mai's army eventually suffered a devastating defeat, resulting in the deaths of several important Bornu leaders, including the Galadima. With support from Sokoto, the Bornu Fulani began advancing further into Bornu territory. In 1808, Ngazargamu, the imperial capital, was captured by the Fulani, forcing mai Ahmad to flee. Due to his old age and blindness, the mai abdicated in favour of his son, Dunama IX Lefiami, hoping he would be able to turn the tide and reclaim the capital.

Ngala was attacked by a local Fulani leader, Muhammad Wabi, with the support of Goni Mukhtar, a key leader in the jihad in Bornu. al-Kanemi, leading a small group of students, mallams, and a few Kanembu and Shuwa Arab mercenaries, successfully defended Ngala and defeated Wabi's forces. This minor victory brought him some recognition in the region. Upon hearing of al-Kanemi's success, mai Dunama called upon him to assist in the effort to recapture Ngazargamu.

=== Liberation of Ngazargamu ===
Many accounts of al-Kanemi’s involvement in the liberation of Ngazargamu have been embellished with legend and myth. However, it is clear that he focused more on spiritual rather than military means to secure the victory. Traditional stories suggest that al-Kanemi isolated himself in prayer for several days, after which he created a religious charm by inscribing Arabic formulas on a small calabash. He then instructed the mai to smash the calabash on the ground just before his army engaged the Fulani forces. Dunama followed the instructions, and Ngazargamu was recaptured. After suffering heavy casualties, including the death of Goni Mukhtar, the Fulani fled the area.

Although the mai held a military advantage over the Fulani, al-Kanemi's contribution to this victory was clear. According to Heinrich Barth, a German explorer who visited Bornu in the 1850s, "the inspiring fanaticism of [al-Kanemi], and by the courage and valour of his Kanembu spearmen" led to the victory at Ngazargamu.

=== Ideological defense against the jihad ===
al-Kanemi waged his war against Sokoto not only with weapons but also with letters as he desired to thwart dan Fodio's jihad with the same ideological weapons. He carried on a series of theological, legal and political debates by letter with Usman dan Fodio, and later with his son and successor, Muhammed Bello, Caliph of Sokoto. As the expansion of Sokoto was predicated upon a struggle against paganism, apostasy and misrule, al-Kanemi challenged the right of his neighbours to strike at a state which had been Muslim for at least 800 years. These debates, often on the nature of jihad and Muslim rule, have remained as points of contention in modern Nigeria.

== Rise to fame ==
After the battle, al-Kanemi’s reputation in Bornu grew rapidly, and his fame spread throughout the empire. In gratitude, mai Dunama gifted him money, cattle, and slaves. After receiving these gifts, al-Kanemi returned to Ngala to continue his religious studies. However, in 1809, a Fulani force led by Ibrahim Zaki advanced from Katagum to Ngazargamu, forcing the mai to flee the capital once again. He summoned al-Kanemi, and together they marched against Ibrahim Zaki, only to discover that he had already abandoned the capital and returned to Katagum. Shortly after their arrival, Muhammad Manga, son and successor of Goni Mukhtar, launched attacks on the region around Ngazargamu and Alau. al-Kanemi led a force against Manga, chasing him beyond Damaturu.

Mai Dunama increasingly relied on al-Kanemi’s military expertise, significantly boosting al-Kanemi’s influence in Bornu. In 1809, al-Kanemi requested a fief around Ngurno, a Kanembu area, granted by the mai. al-Kanemi moved there with a large retinue of Shuwa Arabs and Kanembu followers. Mai Dunama decided not to return to Ngazargamu as he considered the area too exposed to the Fulani. Instead, he moved to the eastern provinces of Bornu, never settling in one place for more than a few months. This constant movement, coupled with his inability to effectively end the Fulani hostilities, made him unpopular among his courtiers. His growing friendship with al-Kanemi further damaged his standing with the titled courtiers, eventually leading to a palace revolt in which Dunama was deposed and replaced by his uncle, Muhammad IX Ngileruma.

== Shehu of Bornu ==
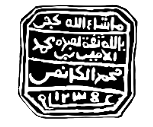
al-Kanemi's official seal, 1819

When al-Kanemi rose to power after the Fulani jihad, he did not totally reorganise the Kanem–Bornu Empire; he only tried to insert his men in the existing framework of territorial fiefs, the chima chidibe. The historian Ronald Cohen has argued that the main political organisation of nineteenth century Borno was based on personal relationships and that al-Kanemi took part in a patron-client relationship. The rule of al-Kanemi and his successors was marked by the production of a remarkable written administrative and diplomatic production. More than a hundred diplomatic letters are preserved between 1823 and 1918. They all bear validation marks that show a strong visual identity and the work of an established administration.

Several men supported al-Kanemi's rise to power in Bornu; they include his childhood friend al-Hajj Sudani, a Toubou trader and family friend al-Hajj Malia, his eldest brother-in-law from his wife's family who led the Kanembu Kuburi in Kanem as Shettima Kuburi, and three Shuwa Arabs: Mallam Muhammad Tirab of Baghirimi, Mallam Ibrahim Wadaima of Wadai, and Mallam Ahmed Gonomi.

It is not clear as to what extent al-Kanemi was dominating the whole territory of Borno after the Fulani jihad, he might have been at the head of a personal principality or might have eclipsed the power of the mai. The process of his rise in power may have been gradual and is not very well documented. In 1814, al-Kanemi constructed the new city of Kukawa, which became the de facto capital of Bornu, and took the new title shehu ("sheikh"). He later backdated his rule as shehu to 1809. Oral history and European explorers' narratives present one version of al-Kanemi's rise to power. In this version, al-Kanemi assumed power in the 1810s, initially without any competition from Dunama IX Lefiami. al-Kanemi became more and more indispensable to the mai. Several of Dunama's courtiers were believed to have been behind an attempt to kill the shehu in 1817. At this date, Dunama and Sultan ‘Uthman Burkomanda III al-Kabir of Bagirmi plotted to get rid of al-Kanemi. This foreign intervention failed and Dunama was replaced as mai with his brother, Ibrahim IV Lefiami. al-Kanemi, while still the titular subject of the new mai, had his own seals struck as shehu.

Later in the 1820s, al-Kanemi drove the Fulani out of Bornu, challenging the Sokoto Caliphate, and occupied the Deya-Damaturu area. This was followed by the occupation of the Kotoko kingdom city states of Kousséri, Ngulfai, and Logone, after defeating the Bagirmi in 1824.

Al-Kanemi died on 8 June 1837 and was succeeded as shehu by his son, Umar Kura.

== Appearance and image ==
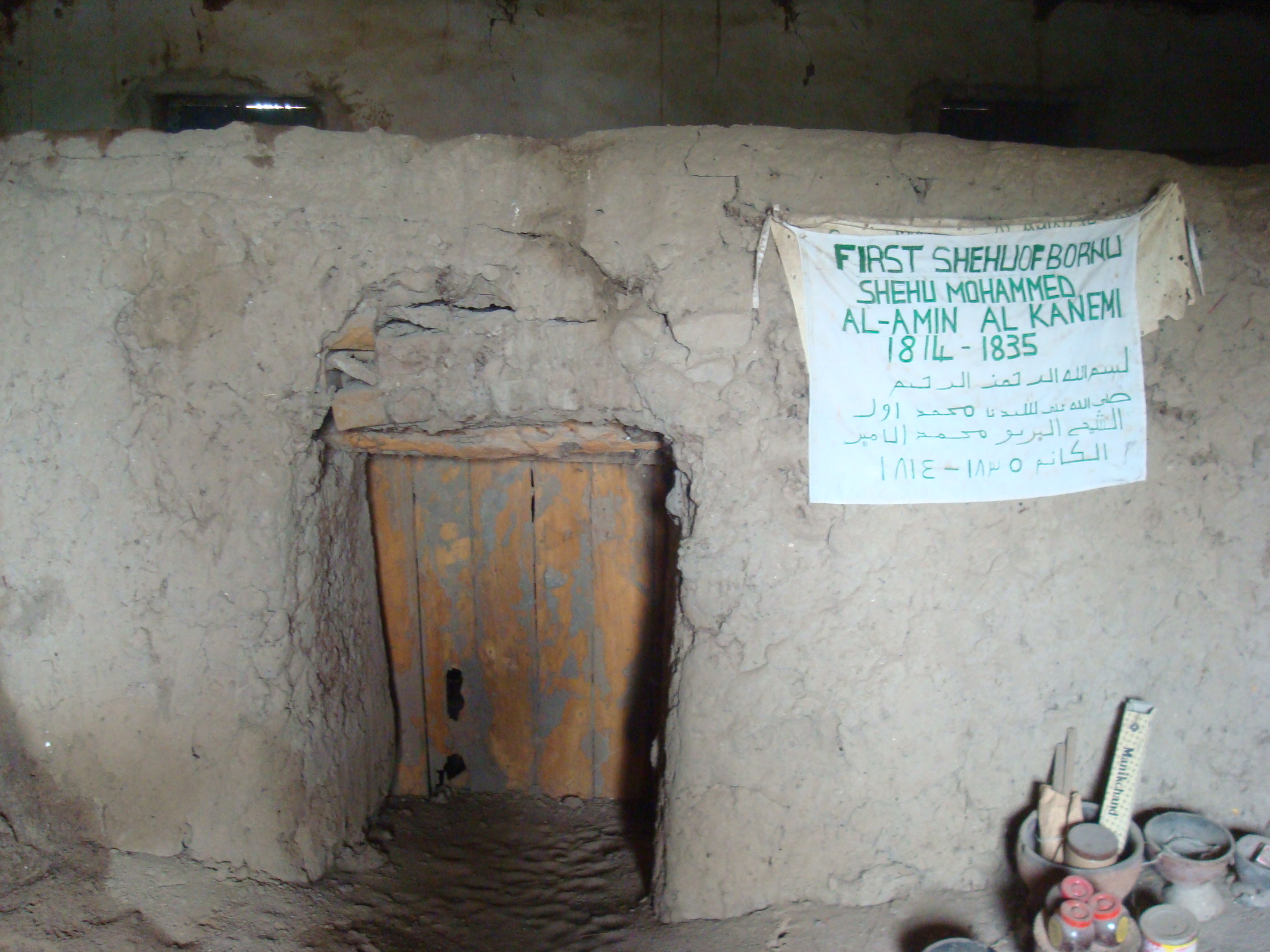
Tomb of al-Kanemi in Kukawa

=== al-Kanemi as seen by Dixon Denham ===
In February 1823, a British expedition led by Major Dixon Denham and Captain Hugh Clapperton arrived in Borno. They were introduced to al-Kanemi. In his travel narrative published in 1826, Dixon Denham described al-Kanemi:

Nature has bestowed on him all the qualifications for a great commander; an enterprising genius, sound judgment, features engaging, with a demeanour gentle and conciliating: and so little of vanity was there mixed with his ambition, that he refused the offer of being made sultan

— Dixon Denham

== Bibliography ==
- Brenner, Louis, The Shehus of Kukawa: A History of the Al-Kanemi Dynasty of Bornu, Oxford Studies in African Affairs (Oxford, Clarendon Press, 1973).
- Cohen, Ronald, The Kanuri of Bornu, Case Studies in Cultural Anthropology (New York: Holt, 1967).
- Denham, Dixon and Captain Clapperton and the Late Doctor Oudney, Narrative of Travels and Discoveries in Northern and Central Africa, (Boston: Cummings, Hilliards and Co., 1826).
- Isichei, Elizabeth, A History of African Societies to 1870 (Cambridge: Cambridge University Press, 1997), pp. 318–320, ISBN 0-521-45599-5.
- Lange, Dierk, 'The kingdoms and peoples of Chad', in General history of Africa, ed. by Djibril Tamsir Niane, IV (London: Unesco, Heinemann, 1984), pp. 238–265.
- Last, Murray, ‘Le Califat De Sokoto Et Borno', in Histoire Generale De l'Afrique, Rev. ed. (Paris: Presence Africaine, 1986), pp. 599–646.
- Lavers, John, "The Al- Kanimiyyin Shehus: a Working Chronology" in Berichte des Sonderforschungsbereichs, 268, Bd. 2, Frankfurt a. M. 1993: 179-186.
- Oliver, Roland & Anthony Atmore (2005). Africa Since 1800, Fifth Edition. Cambridge: Cambridge University Press. ISBN 0-521-83615-8.
- Palmer, Herbert Richmond, The Bornu Sahara and Sudan (London: John Murray, 1936).
- Taher, Mohamed (1997). Encyclopedic Survey of Islamic Dynasties A Continuing Series. New Delhi: Anmol Publications PVT. LTD. ISBN 81-261-0403-1.
