= Umar Kura =

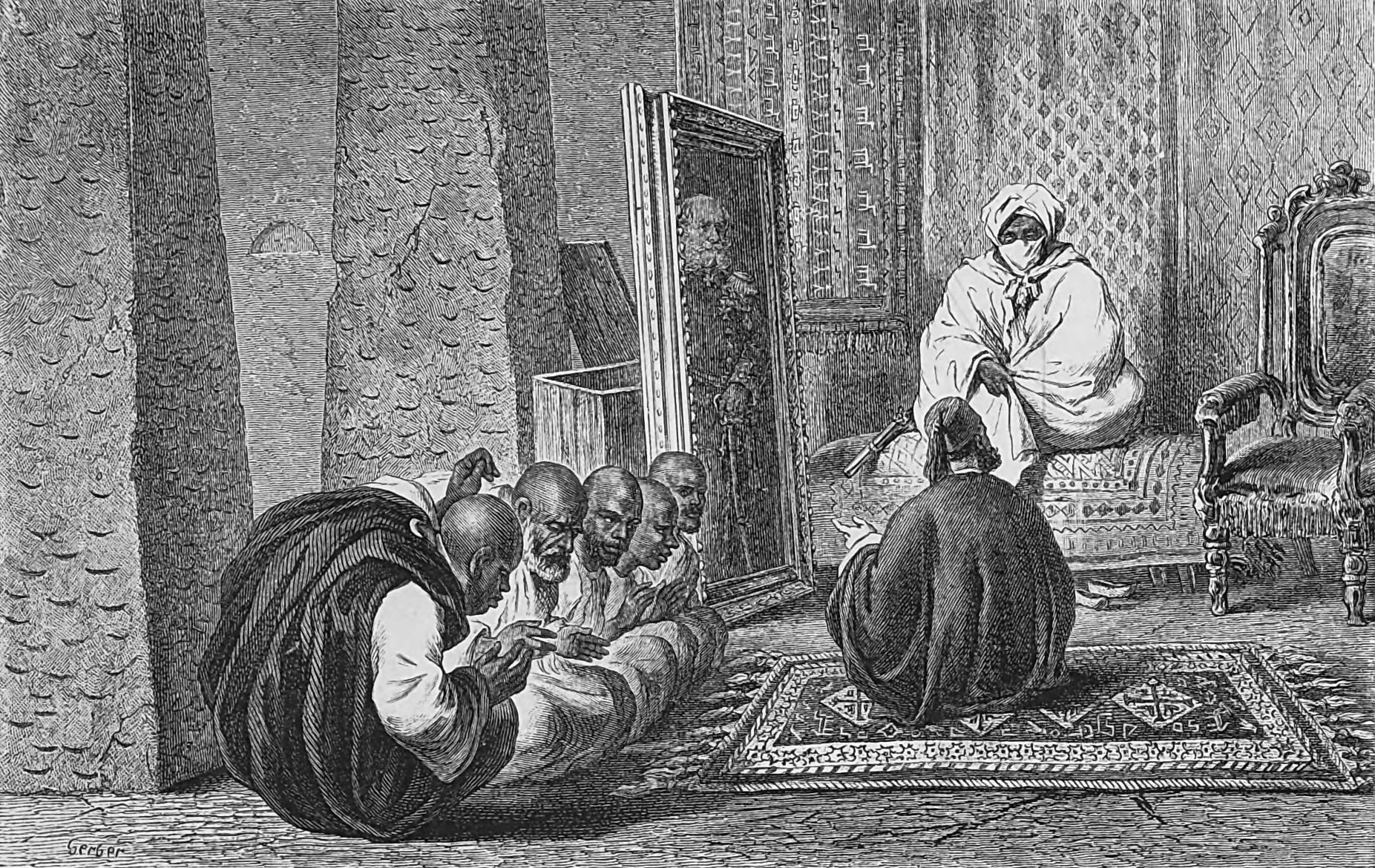
- Umar Kura receiving gifts from Wilhelm I of the German Empire on 6 June 1870, as depicted by Gustav Nachtigal in his travel narrative, Săharâ und Sûdân, p.594

Shehu of the Kanem–Bornu Empire
- 1st reign: 8 June 1837 – 4 October 1853
- Predecessor: Muhammad al-Amin al-Kanemi
- Successor: ʽAbd ar-Rahman
- 2nd reign: 3 September 1854 – December 1881
- Predecessor: ʽAbd ar-Rahman
- Successor: Bukar Kura
- Died: December 1881
- Issue: Bukar Kura; Ibrahim Kura; Ashimi
- Dynasty: al-Kanemi dynasty
- Father: Muhammad al-Amin al-Kanemi

Umar bin Muhammad al-Amin al-Kanemi (Arabic: عمر الأول ابن محمد الأمين الكانمي), called Umar Kura, (Note: Regnal numbers were never officially in use in Bornu, but Umar is sometimes enumerated as Umar I (as the first shehu of this name) or Umar IV (as the fourth ruler of the empire with this name, after Umar I, Umar II, and Umar III).) was the shehu of the Kanem–Bornu Empire in 1837–1853 and 1854–1881. The position of shehu ("sheikh") was established by Umar's father, Muhammad al-Amin al-Kanemi, and gradually surpassed the power and influence of the empire's original line of rulers, the mais. In 1846, Umar deposed the last mai and transitioned from being the empire's de facto ruler to its undisputed de jure ruler.

Although characterised as a weak and indecisive ruler, Umar's first reign saw several important developments, including improving relations with the Sokoto Caliphate, victories over Damagaram and Wadai, and an overall consolidation of the empire. Umar was deposed by his brother ʽAbd ar-Rahman in 1853 but was restored to the throne in 1854 due to ʽAbd ar-Rahman's tyrannical rule. Umar adopted a relatively passive foreign policy during his second reign; although some gains were made, there was an overall deterioration in Bornu's power and influence. Umar heavily relied on his courtiers, bestowing great influence and power on his favorites, such as his son Bukar Kura and the aristocrat Laminu Njitiya.

== Early life ==
Umar Kura was a son of shehu Muhammad al-Amin al-Kanemi (r. 1809–1837). His mother was a princess from the Sultanate of Bagirmi, who had been captured in war and treated as a concubine by his father.

Umar took part in his father's military campaigns during the conflicts between the Kanem–Bornu Empire and Fulani invaders during the Fula jihads. In the late 1820s, Umar was placed in charge of a campaign against the town of Wari. The siege of Wari was so long that Umar's father accused the officers of purposely attempting to embarrass Umar.

On his deathbed, al-Kanemi extracted a promise from his six most influential companions, the so-called council of six, that Umar, his eldest surviving son, should succeed him as shehu. Umar had at least one older brother, Salih, who had been killed in 1819.

== Reign ==
=== Early reign (1837–1846) ===
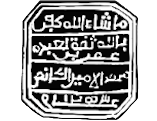
Umar Kura's official seal, 1837

Muhammad al-Amin al-Kanemi died on 8 June 1837. (Note: Muhammad al-Amin al-Kanemi's death is often erroneously given as 1835. Contemporary letters, elegies, and other documents confidently place his death in 1837. A handful of documents examined by John E. Lavers in 1993 allowed him to place the death soon after the last evening prayer of the fourth day in the month of the prophet's birthday, i.e. Thursday 8 June, 1837.) Umar faced some opposition upon his accession as shehu. Al-Hajj Sudani, a childhood friend of Umar's father and a prominent general, was killed on a military expedition but was rumored to have been assassinated since he was expected to oppose Umar's rise to power.

For mai Ibrahim IV Lefiami (the mais being the empire's original line of rulers), al-Kanemi's death meant the possibility to reassert his traditional power. Ibrahim and his courtiers at the capital of Kafela had believed that the power of the shehu would simply melt away with al-Kanemi's death. Ibrahim thus wrote to Umar and commanded him to come to Kafela and offer his allegiance. Umar wrote back and instead demanded that the mai come to his seat, Kukawa. Three of Umar's courtiers sent an additional message to Ibrahim, stating "when we buried Shehu Laminu [al-Kanemi] we buried only him. All the courtiers, horses, and weapons are still with his son, Umar Kura. If you refuse to come here, we will see you at Birni Kafela". Ibrahim was intimidated and traveled to Kukawa to submit to Umar Kura. Umar Kura was angered by Ibrahim's hesitancy and reduced the already meagre subsidy granted to him.

Umar initially governed Bornu much in the same way as his father had but it is clear that Umar lacked his father's determination and leadership abilities. According to the historian Louis Brenner (1973): "although the power of Kukawa expanded during the lengthy reign of Umar, as we shall see, this was almost in spite of, rather than a result of, the new Shehu." Few details are known about the first nine years of Umar's reign, though the main developments are recorded. During Umar's initial years, conflicts with the Fulani and the Sokoto Caliphate continued. Umar launched several campaigns against them, some led by his younger brother ʽAbd ar-Rahman, one of his most influential courtiers. Over the course of Umar's first years, relations with Sokoto improved, especially as both Bornu and Sokoto both focused more of their forces against the Sultanate of Damagaram. In the early 1850s, the German explorer Heinrich Barth visited Bornu and stated that relations were steadily improving between Umar and Sokoto's ruler, Ali Babba bin Bello, and that Damagaram had been reduced to a Bornu vassal state.

1907 illustration of Wadai Sultanate cavalry

While ʽAbd ar-Rahman was on a campaign against Damagaram in early 1846, mai Ibrahim made a second attempt to restore the power of his office. The events of 1837 had increased Ibrahim's desperation to rid himself of Umar and he had secured the support of the Wadai Sultanate, a natural ally for the mai since Wadai had clashed with Umar's father over influence over Bagirmi. With ʽAbd ar-Rahman gone with the majority of the army, the Wadai forces faced little initial resistance. Umar learnt of the invasion when the Wadai forces were approaching the Chari River and he quickly realised that Ibrahim was behind the plot. Ibrahim was imprisoned and Umar gathered the available troops to fight the invaders. The shehu camped near Kousséri but he was unable to fight against the Wadai army since neither force could cross the nearby river. After a few days, the Wadai army located a ford in the river and could surprise attack Umar's forces. Umar was forced to retreat to Kukawa, where he executed Ibrahim before fleeing north-west to join forces with ʽAbd ar-Rahman. The Wadai forces managed to capture and partially destroy Kukawa, where they installed Ibrahim's son Ali V Minargema as mai. When Umar and ʽAbd ar-Rahman returned, the Wadai army fled, leaving Ali and his supporters to face the shehu's forces alone. Ali was defeated and killed in battle at Minarge, near the Yobe River.

After Ali's defeat, Umar abolished the office of mai and became the Kanem–Bornu Empire's sole ruler, formally establishing the shehus as the empire's new line of monarchs. Umar had Kafela destroyed and many of Ali's relatives killed. Kukawa transitioned into the empire's capital and was rebuilt and expanded following its partial destruction by the Wadai forces. To illustrate his rise as the formal monarch of the empire, Umar appropriated several symbols of the former dynasty, and gave former royal honorifics to his relatives, such as titling his mother as the Ya Magira and his senior wife as the Ya Gumsu.

=== Internal divisions and deposition (1846–1854) ===
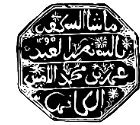
Umar Kura's official seal, 1849

The defeat of the mais led to division and factionalism at Umar's new imperial court since his courtiers were no longer united by an external rival. While the courtiers of Umar's father had also been united by personal loyalty to the shehu, Umar's court was both larger and composed of the descendants and relatives of his father's courtiers, all of whom no longer had a personal relationship with the shehu. As monarch, Umar has been characterised as weak, indecisive, and timorous. He shared power and decisions with courtiers and slaves to a much greater extent than his father, which deteriorated his own power and influence. The initial success of the Wadai invasion in 1846 inspired several regions within the empire to attempt to seek their independence, forcing Umar to order military campaigns against various provinces and vassals of the empire.

In the aftermath of Umar's rise to sole power, al-Hajj Bashir, long a close friend of Umar, was appointed as waziri (vizier) and became the most influential person at court other than the shehu himself. Heinrich Barth later described Bashir as "a most excellent, kind, liberal, and just man, [who] might have done much good to the country if he had been less selfish and more active." Bashir's chief rival at court was Umar's brother ʽAbd ar-Rahman, who as only a few months younger than Umar considered himself entitled to great power. Barth assessed ʽAbd ar-Rahman negatively, writing that he as "a youth had committed all sorts of violence and injustice, carrying of young brides by force to indulge his passions", and that he was "a man of little intelligence". A feud had also developed between ʽAbd ar-Rahman and Umar since ʽAbd ar-Rahman had been promised and expected the assignment to loot Kafela in 1846, a task that had instead been given to Bashir.

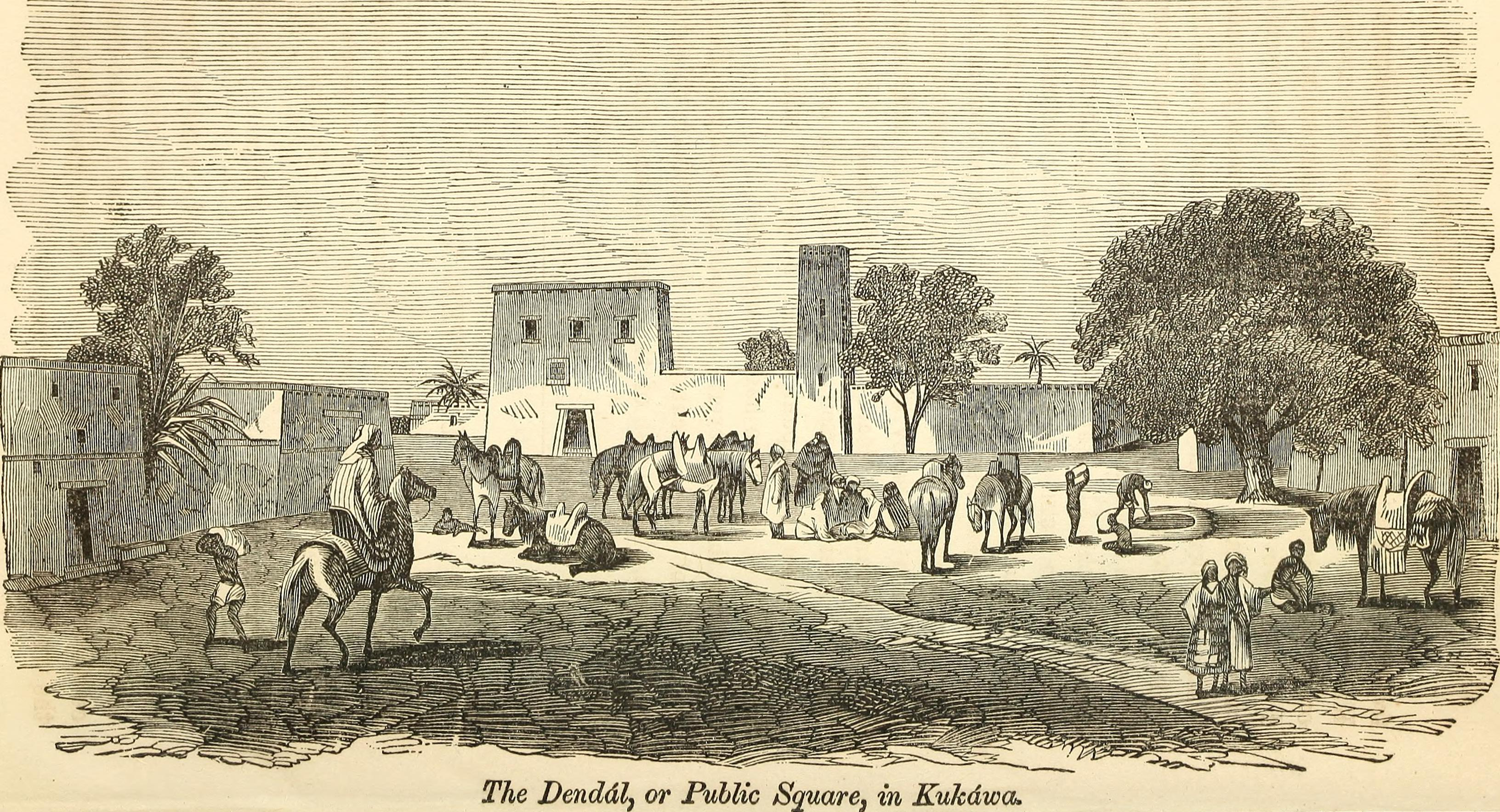
Central square of Kukawa in 1851

Most courtiers favored Umar but Bashir gradually alienated many of these supporters. Because of Umar's ever-growing reliance on Bashir, it soon became obvious that courtiers wishing to increase their favour and wealth were blocked by Bashir in doing so. Many at court thus decided that Bashir had to be replaced, even if that meant also replacing Umar as shehu. In 1853, Umar reacted to increasing signs of imminent rebellion by imposing a curfew in Kukawa, overseen by a detachment of troops led by Laminu Njitiya, Bashir's wakil (chief assistant). Soon after the curfew began, Laminu's troops fought in a skirmish against ʽAbd ar-Rahman's supporters in Kukawa, during which one of Laminu's hands was broken. The morning after the skirmish, Umar convened the court and wore a red robe, reserved for occasions when punishments were to be meted out. ʽAbd ar-Rahman was summoned and accused of breaking Laminu's hand, though ʽAbd ar-Rahman disrespected both Umar and Bashir and then left the room. ʽAbd ar-Rahman and his supporters left for Damaturu, pursued by Umar and Bashir. A short encounter followed but it was clear that ʽAbd ar-Rahman's forces were stronger. Bashir fled back to Kukawa, gathered his belongings, and then fled in the direction of the Chari River. Laminu fled into exile to somewhere in the empire's provinces. Umar himself realised that ʽAbd ar-Rahman would prevail and thus agreed to abdicate in his favor.

Umar's abdication and ʽAbd ar-Rahman's accession as shehu took place in the winter of 1853, probably on 4 October. There had been some fighting but the coup had been completed with very little violence. ʽAbd ar-Rahman allowed Umar to remain unharmed in Kukawa, albeit with greatly reduced status and influence. The courtiers soon realised that ʽAbd ar-Rahman was a violent tyrant, much more difficult to work with than the indecisive Umar or the selfish Bashir. Bashir himself was found by ʽAbd ar-Rahman and strangled in the court's council room. The idea to return Umar to the throne grew increasingly popular as ʽAbd ar-Rahman's reign continued. On 3 September 1854, there was a short skirmish in the streets of Kukawa, whereafter Umar was restored as shehu. ʽAbd ar-Rahman escaped from the capital but was soon captured and returned. He was executed in early December as it became clear that he retained his political ambitions.

=== Second reign (1854–1881) ===
Once returned to power, Umar returned to his previous style of governance, re-appointing and relying on old favorites, such as Mallam Muhammad, the chief qadi, and Digma Ibrahim, influential among the slaves at court. Laminu reached a position of enormous influence in Umar's new court, entrusted with great power and many fiefs that had previously belonged to Bashir.

Umar adopted a general passivity in foreign affairs during his second reign, though small territorial gains were made through military campaigns led by Laminu and by Umar's son Bukar Kura. The goal of these campaigns is not clear, since they did not eliminate any enemies or secure trade or security of the state. Instead, there was an overall pattern of deteriorating external affairs. Umar was unable to maintain Bornu's suzerainty over Bagirmi, which instead became a vassal of Wadai. No effort was made by the shehu to retain power over Kanem, east of Lake Chad, which soon slipped into a chaotic period of internal strife and civil war. Through politics and military campaigns, Bukar Kura ensured that the Mandara Kingdom in the south remained a vassal to the empire. Relations between Bornu and Sokoto were peaceful throughout Umar's second reign, though both states undertook indirect measures to undermine the other, such as financing rebels and enemies.

The Kanem–Bornu Empire relied on the trans-Saharan trade for wealth and survival. By the middle of the nineteenth century, the trans-Saharan trade was suffering due to several factors, including insecurity in Fezzan and a decrease in the demand for slaves in North Africa and European colonies. The insecurity in Fezzan was due to raids by various groups, such as the Tuareg and the Ouled Slimane Arabs. The Tuareg were the most serious northern threat since they sometimes raided into Bornu proper, kidnapping people, stealing property, and laying waste to villages. External problems deriving from Umar's lack of direction in foreign policy had little impact in his own time, but blossomed into crises under his successors.

Laminu died in 1871, which reinvigorated court politics and struggles for the shehu's favor. The struggle to gain Umar's favor was won by Umar's son Bukar Kura and Bukar Kura's close companion Ahamed bin Ibrahim Wadaima, who may have been named waziri. Umar relied more and more on Bukar Kura during his final years and was close to appointing him regent. The favor gained by Bukar alienated both Ahamed and Umar's second son, Ibrahim Kura, leading to renewed feuds within the imperial family and at court. Umar died in December 1881 (Note: Some scholars have alternatively given dates such as 1879 and 1880, based on erroneous calculations or a wrong start year for Umar's reign.) and was succeeded as shehu by Bukar Kura.
