= Ibrahim IV Lefiami =

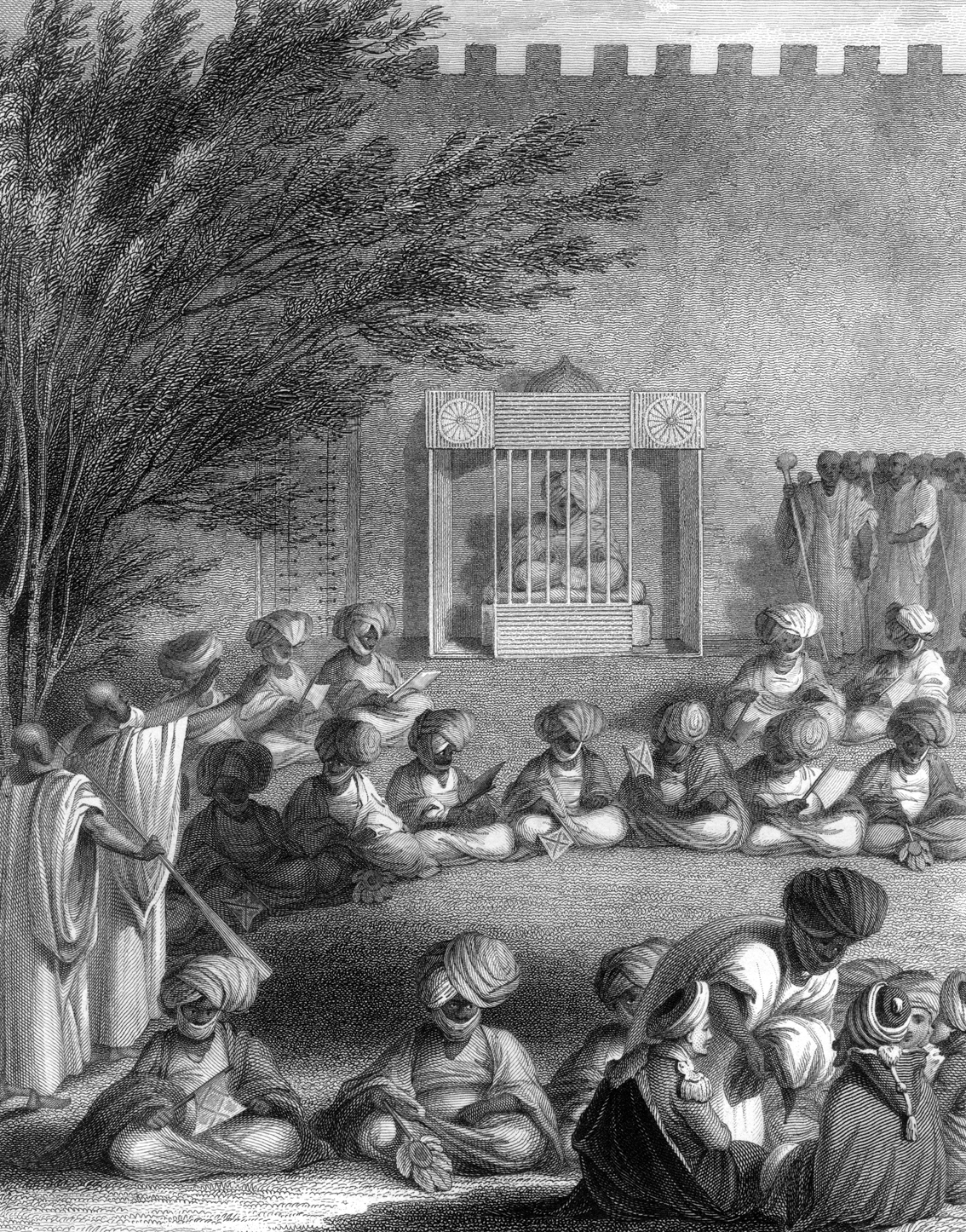
- Ibrahim IV and his council at Kafela in 1823. The mai is seated inside the zanadir, a traditional wooden cage used when holding court.

Mai of the Kanem–Bornu Empire
- Reign: 1817–1846
- Predecessor: Dunama IX Lefiami
- Successor: Ali V Minargema
- Died: 1846; Kukawa, Bornu
- Burial: Kukawa
- Spouse: Delatu
- Issue: Ali V Minargema
- Dynasty: Sayfawa dynasty
- Father: Ahmad Alimi
- Mother: Lefiya

Ibrahim IV (Ibrāhīm bin Aḥmad), called Ibrahim Lefiami, (Note: Ibrahim is sometimes also recorded under the Kanuri name Bura.) was the penultimate mai of the Kanem–Bornu Empire, ruling 1817–1846. Ibrahim served as little more than a ceremonial puppet ruler under the shehus Muhammad al-Amin al-Kanemi and Umar Kura. He attempted to reassert the traditional power of the mai twice, first in 1837 and then in 1846, but was killed during the second attempt. Ibrahim was only briefly succeeded by his son, Ali V Minargema, before the office of mai was abolished for good.

== Life ==
=== Accession to the throne ===
Ibrahim was a son of mai Ahmad Alimi. As indicated by the name Lefiami, his mother was named Lefiya. Ibrahim was the younger brother of his predecessor, Dunama IX Lefiami. In the early 19th century, Dunama had called on the religious scholar and military leader Muhammad al-Amin al-Kanemi for help against the Fula jihads. Although al-Kanemi managed to save the empire, he also gradually usurped power under the new title of shehu. In 1817, Dunama plotted to restore his power, secretly inviting the Sultanate of Bagirmi to invade the empire and kill al-Kanemi. The plot backfired, as the Bagirmi troops accidentally attacked Dunama's forces instead and the mai was killed in battle.

Dunama's death secured the transfer of power over the empire from the mai to the shehu, though al-Kanemi chose not to adopt the style of a monarch. Instead, he presided over the installation of Ibrahim at Kafela. Ibrahim was less than twenty years old at the time and served as little more than a ceremonial puppet ruler. Ibrahim received very little income other than what was forwarded to him by the shehu.

=== Attempts to reassert power ===
In 1837, al-Kanemi died and was succeeded as shehu by his son, Umar Kura. Ibrahim and his court had waited for al-Kanemis' death for years, hoping to reassert the traditional power of the monarchy, but had apparently not prepared for the moment. It seems that the mai had hoped that the power gathered by al-Kanemi would simply disappear with his death. Ibrahim immediately confronted Umar Kura, demanding that Umar Kura come to Kafela and offer his allegiance. This backfired, as Umar Kura instead demanded that the mai come to his seat, at Kukawa. Umar Kura's courtiers wrote to Ibrahim that "when we buried Shehu Laminu [al-Kanemi] we buried only him. All the courtiers, horses, and weapons are still with his son, Umar Kura. If you refuse to come here, we will see you at Birni Kafela". Ibrahim was intimidated and traveled to Kukawa to submit to Umar Kura. Umar Kura was angered by Ibrahim's hesitancy and reduced the already meagre subsidy granted to him.

In 1846, Ibrahim hatched a new plan to restore his power and invited an external army from the Wadai Sultanate to invade Bornu in his name while Umar Kura's forces were away from Kukawa, igniting a civil war. The plan was strategically sound, since the majority of the shehu's army was absent from Kukawa at the time. Umar Kura learnt of the invasion when the Wadai army was approaching the Chari River and quickly realised that Ibrahim was behind the plot. Umar Kura had Ibrahim imprisoned and gathered the available troops to fight the invaders. The shehu camped near Kousséri but he was unable to fight against the Wadai army since neither force could cross the nearby river. After a few days, the Wadai army located a ford in the river and could surprise attack Umar Kura's forces. Umar Kura was forced to retreat to Kukawa, where he executed Ibrahim before fleeing north-west to join forces with his brother 'Abd ar-Rahman. Ibrahim was reportedly buried at Kukawa.

The Wadai forces managed to capture and partially destroy Kukawa, where they installed Ibrahim's son Ali V Minargema as mai. When Umar Kura and 'Abd ar-Rahman's forces returned, the Wadai army fled, leaving Ali and his supporters to face the shehu's forces alone. Ali was defeated and killed in the subsequent battle, whereafter Umar Kura had the office of mai abolished.
