= Ali III Walamma =

Mai of the Kanem–Bornu Empire
- Reign: 17th century (35–40 years) c. 1645–1680 (Note: Different king lists (girgams) and chronicles translated in the 19th–20th centuries give Ali slightly different regnal lengths: 36–40 years (Palmer), 37 years (Urvoy), 38 years and 5 months (Landeroin), 39 years (Nachtigal), or 40 years (Barth). As a result of this, and due to different calculations for other mais, various dates have been given for his reign, including 1645–1684 (Barth), 1644–1680/1684 (Palmer), 1657–1694 (Urvoy), 1636–1674 (Landeroin), and 1631–1670 (Nachtigal). Cohen (1966) considered a reign of 40 years most likely. Bosworth (2012) followed Barth's dates, estimating Ali's reign to 1645–1684.)
- Predecessor: Biri V or Umar III al-Maqdisi
- Successor: Idris V
- Died: c. 1680; Ngazargamu, Bornu
- Issue: Idris V Dunama VII Martemarambi
- Dynasty: Sayfawa dynasty
- Father: Umar III al-Maqdisi

al-Ḥājj Ali III (ʿAlī bin ʿUmar), called Ali Walamma (Note: "Ali, lord of Walam".) and various other names, (Note: Other names applied to Ali III include Ali Walatam ("Ali, lord of Walata"), Ali Walandikuma ("Ali, lord of Walam Diku"), Ali Walatan ugma ("Ali, lord of five Walatas"), Ali Dala degu ("Ali of the four Dalas", referencing four figures by the name Dala who were influential in his reign), and Ali Kafe Madabe ("Ali of Kafe Mada").) was mai (ruler) of the Kanem–Bornu Empire in the mid-to-late 17th century, ruling approximately 1645–1680. Ali's reign saw conflict both within and outside the empire, in particular against the Sultanate of Agadez, and several famines, perhaps due to the strife experienced in the empire. Despite these challenges, Ali is remembered as a valiant and intelligent ruler.

== Life ==
Ali was a son of mai Umar III al-Maqdisi. Ali became mai in the mid-17th century, succeeding either his father or his briefly reigning brother Biri V, whose historicity is unclear.

The German explorer Heinrich Barth, who visited Bornu in the mid-19th century (about two centuries after Ali's time), stated that the royal chronicles of the empire recorded Ali as a "valiant and intelligent man", who thrice made pilgrimages to Mecca. Barth dated these pilgrimages to 1648, 1656, and 1667. Ali's reign appears to have included several long famines, perhaps explainable by strife in the empire hindering the people from cultivating the ground. One of these famines was in later chronicles named Dala Dama.

Recorded as a skilled warrior, Ali waged several wars against the Sultanate of Agadez in the north. During one of these wars, the Kanem–Bornu capital of Ngazargamu was besieged by a combined Tuareg and Kwararafa army. Ali managed to turn the Tuareg and Kwararafa against each other and then defeated the remaining forces of both. On Ali's return from Mecca after his third pilgrimage he also had to put down an uprising against his rule. Ali may have died on his way back from another pilgrimage to Mecca. He was remembered by nicknames such as the "lion of lions" and was also called "the bird" because he swiftly moved from place to place.

Ali had a long reign, lasting over three decades. He died at Ngazargamu and was succeeded as mai by his son Idris V.
