= Muhammad VIII Ergama =

Mai of the Kanem–Bornu Empire
- Reign: 18th century (13–16 years) c. 1731–1747 (Note: Different king lists (girgams) and chronicles translated in the 19th–20th centuries give Muhammad slightly different regnal lengths: 13 years (Urvoy), 14 years (Landeroin), 15 years (Nachtigal), or 16 years (Barth, Palmer). As a result of this, and due to different calculations for other mais, various dates have been given for his reign, including 1737–1751 (Barth), 1731–1747 (Palmer), 1738–1751 (Urvoy), 1727–1742 (Landeroin), and 1731–1746 (Nachtigal). Cohen (1966) considered a reign of 15 years to be most likely. Bosworth (2012) followed Palmer and dated Muhammad's reign to 1731–1747.)
- Predecessor: Hamdan Dunamami
- Successor: Dunama VIII Gana
- Died: c. 1747; Ngazargamu, Bornu
- Spouse: Lefiya
- Issue: Dunama VIII Gana (Note: Every author other than Richmond Palmer agrees that Dunama VIII Gana was Muhammad VIII Ergama's son. Palmer instead names Dunama's father as Aman.)
- Dynasty: Sayfawa dynasty
- Father: Hamdan Dunamami (Note: Some versions of the royal chronicle record Muhammad as the son of "Dunama"; Dunama is sometimes used as an alternate name for Hamdan.)
- Mother: Fanna

Muhammad VIII (Note: Some chronologies of Kanem–Bornu rulers omit the 14th-century Muhammad II Manza, lowering the regnal numbers of later rulers of this name. This ruler is then considered Muhammad VII.) (Muḥammad bin Ḥamdūn), called Muhammad Ergama, (Note: The name is also spelled Muhammad Erghamma and Muhammad Irgama.) Muhammad Hajimite, (Note: "Muhammad son of "Haji", i.e. Hamdan Dunamami (sometimes recorded with the honorific al-Ḥājj)) and Muhammad Fannami, (Note: "Muhammad, son of Fanna") was mai (ruler) of the Kanem–Bornu Empire in the first half of the 18th century, ruling approximately 1731–1747.

== Life ==
Muhammad was a son of mai Hamdan Dunamami, who he succeeded as mai during the first half of the 18th century. Muhammad's mother was named Fanna. Little is recorded of Muhammad's reign. A two-year famine is recorded in his time; later chronicles named this famine Ali Shuwa. The German explorer Heinrich Barth, who visited Bornu in the 1850s (about a century after Muhammad's reign), assessed Muhammad and his immediate predecessors and successors negatively:

Of his reign likewise we know nothing but of a famine which lasted two years. These princes, indeed, seem in general to have seldom left their favourite residence, where they indulged in luxury and ostentation, while the kingdom was falling to pieces and became unable to resist any shock which might come from without.

A girgam translated by Richmond Palmer exaggerates the size of the empire by Muhammad's time, claiming that "in the East his domains were bounded by the Nile, in the West by the setting sun." Muhammad ruled for over a decade, between 13 and 16 years. He died at Ngazargamu and was succeeded as mai by his son Dunama VIII Gana.
