= Dunama IX Lefiami =

Mai of the Kanem–Bornu Empire
- 1st reign: 1808–1811
- Predecessor: Ahmad Alimi
- Successor: Muhammad IX Ngileruma
- 2nd reign: 1814–1817 (Note: Heinrich Barth (1857) dated Dunama's death to 1817. Louis Brenner (1973) suggested an alternate date of 1820 or 1821, citing better synchronisms with letters by Muhammad al-Amin al-Kanemi. Virtually every scholar has supported Barth's original date, including pre-Brenner scholars such as Nachtigal (1881), Landeroin (1911), Palmer (1936), and Urvoy (1941), as well as later authors such as Stewart (1989) and Bosworth (2012).)
- Predecessor: Muhammad IX Ngileruma
- Successor: Ibrahim IV Lefiami
- Died: 1817; Ngala, Bornu
- Dynasty: Sayfawa dynasty
- Father: Ahmad Alimi
- Mother: Lefiya

Dunama IX (Note: Some chronologies of Kanem–Bornu rulers omit the 14th-century Dunama III, lowering the regnal numbers of later rulers of this name. This ruler is then considered Dunama VIII.) (Dunama bin Aḥmad), called Dunama Lefiami, was the mai (ruler) of the Kanem–Bornu Empire in 1808–1811 and 1814–1817. Dunama came to power after his elderly father, Ahmad Alimi, decided to abdicate in the aftermath of the Fulani capture and destruction of Ngazargamu, the empire's capital. Dunama led resistance against the invaders and turned the tide with the recruitment of religious scholar and military leader Muhammad al-Amin al-Kanemi. With al-Kanemi's aid, the Fulani were largely repelled from imperial territory and Dunama restored to power.

Dunama came to increasingly rely on al-Kanemi for the defense of the empire against further Fulani attacks, leading to al-Kanemi amassing unprecedented power and influence. Al-Kanemi's increasing influence and Dunama's failure to settle on a new capital raised questions about his leadership. In 1811, Dunama was deposed by his own courtiers in a palace revolt, replaced as mai with his uncle Muhammad IX Ngileruma. Dunama was restored as mai in 1814 with al-Kanemi's aid. Al-Kanemi began to act independently more overtly, adopting the title shehu, establishing his own seat of power at Kukawa, and sometimes avoided properly consulting with the mai on political matters. In 1817, Dunama attempted to remove al-Kanemi by orchestrating an invasion of the empire by the Sultanate of Bagirmi but was himself killed in the fighting.

== First reign ==
=== Wars with the Fulani ===
Dunama was a son of mai Ahmad Alimi. As indicated by the name Lefiami, his mother was named Lefiya. In 1807 at the latest, the Kanem–Bornu Empire became threatened by the Fula jihads. Under Dunama's father Ahmad Alimi, the Fulani captured and destroyed the capital of Ngazargamu in 1808 and occupied and devastated much of the southern and western parts of the empire. Ahmad, accompanied by some of his family and several courtiers, fled east to near Lake Chad. With the empire on the brink of collapse and at an advanced age, Ahmad decided to abdicate in favor of Dunama. This was a controversial decision, since the mai was expected to rule for life.

Dunama immediately resolved to regroup his forces and counter-attack the Fulani. His attention was drawn to Muhammad al-Amin al-Kanemi, a newcomer in the Ngala region who was teaching and performing religious duties. Through his teaching, al-Kanemi had attracted many followers. When the Fulani reached Ngala under the leader Muhammad Wabi, al-Kanemi led a force of his students, bolstered by Kanembu and Baggara Arab mercenaries, and defeated the Fulani contingent. Although the victory was of relatively little importance in the context of the greater conflict, it had symbolic value since it proved the Fulani were not undefeatable. Dunama summoned al-Kameni to help defend the empire and reconquer Ngzargamu.

Dunama had enacted several measures on his own to restore the strength of the empire, such as reorganising the army. The Fulani forces had weakened in the meantime due to desertion of troops. The recruitment of al-Kanemi tipped the balance, inspiring imperial forces through his fanaticism and bolstering the army with his followers and mercenaries. Dunama and al-Kanemi managed to repel the Fulani, restoring Dunama to power over the country. The people recognised al-Kanemi's role in the campaign and praise of his deeds spread throughout the empire. In return for his efforts, al-Kanemi was rewarded with money, slaves, and cattle, and he then returned to his former religious pursuits at Ngala. Dunama re-established himself at what remained of Ngazargamu and began campaigns to pacify the countryside.

In the latter half of 1809, the Fulani leader Ibrahim Zaki marched from Katagum, heading for Ngazargamu. Dunama fled the capital and sought the assistance of al-Kanemi again. Once their army returned to Ngazargamu, they found the site abandoned, Zaki having returned to Katagum. The Fulani leader Muhammad Manga (son of Goni Mukhtar, who had captured Ngazargamu in 1808) then attacked the empire. Manga's invasion was faced by al-Kanemi, who kept him away from Ngazargamu but failed to meet him in a decisive battle.

=== Deposition ===
Due to the repeated threats to Ngazargamu, Dunama decided not to return to the former capital, moving closer to Lake Chad in the east. Dunama was unable to decide upon a new permanent site, instead shifting his residence every few months. The mai's itinerant life inspired the ire of the populace, who gave him the derisive nickname "the mai of the calabash". Dunama's movements also meant that he was unable to consolidate his authority among the nobility and courtiers. Another factor of discontent among the elite was Dunama's friendship with, and reliance on, al-Kanemi. Al-Kanemi had made himself known as the most effective military leader in the empire and had used this to his advantage. In 1809, he requested land around Ngurno, and was swiftly granted a large personal fiefdom there. The great power and wealth bestowed on al-Kanemi was a threat to the established positions of many courtiers and raised further questions among the court about Dunama's leadership.

In 1811, Dunama was deposed by his courtiers in a palace revolt and replaced as mai with his uncle Muhammad IX Ngileruma. The leaders of the conspiracy justified their revolt by arguing that Dunama had been an illegitimate ruler since he became mai while his father was still alive. Muhammad Ngileruma solved some of the grievances with Dunama's rule, for instance establishing a new permanent capital at Kafela, close to al-Kanemi's seat at Ngurno. He did not lessen al-Kanemi's influence, however, instead formally incorporating al-Kanemi and his forces into the empire's defense forces.

== Second reign ==
For much of his reign, Muhammad Ngileruma was caught in power struggles between the ruling classes at Kafela and Ngurno. Muhammad Ngileruma eventually lost support, partly due to the legal strictures he had imposed at court due to his strong religious convictions and due to the lack of decisive action against the Fulani. A conspiracy soon formed and al-Kanemi joined the anti-Ngileruma faction after being promjised a greatly enlarged fief, stretching from Ngurno to Ngala. In 1814, with the pretext of preparing another campaign against the Fulani, al-Kanemi summoned leading courtiers to Ngurno. The courtiers who did not support Dunama were outnumbered and forced to comply. Upon hearing of the conspiracy, Muhammad Ngileruma left Kafela quietly without a fight. Al-Kanemi, the courtiers, and Dunama made their way to Kafela, where Dunama was invested as mai for the second time.

With Dunama's restoration, al-Kanemi had become the most powerful person in the empire and its de facto ruler. Dunama was indebted to him for the throne, he was the leading courtier, and his fief encompassed roughly half the territory of the empire. In 1814, al-Kanemi assumed the new style of shehu (sheikh) and established a new seat for himself at Kukawa. Al-Kanemi's move to Kukawa coincided with him beginning to adopt a significantly more independent attitude to the mai. Al-Kanemi began to make important political and military decisions without properly consulting with Dunama and the court, undermining Dunama's confidence in him.

Several courtiers of Dunama began to encourage the mai to eliminate al-Kanemi. Dunama felt indebted to al-Kanemi had been friendly with him for long. Before the move to Kukawa, the shehu had also not done anything to directly challenge Dunama's authority. The mai thus hesitated, but became increasingly convinced that al-Kanemi had to be removed in order to ensure the security of his own throne and regain sole power. The imperial court entered into an alliance with ‘Uthman Burkomanda III al-Kabir, ruler of the Sultanate of Bagirmi, who feared that al-Kanemi was plotting to invade his country. In 1817, the Bagirmi army invaded the empire, secretly invited to do so by Dunama. Dunama and al-Kanemi marched to meet the invasion together. Burkomanda wrote a letter to Dunama, telling him to keep his forces south of al-Kanemi's so that the shehu could be distinguished in the battle. Al-Kanemi intercepted this letter and, without indicating knowledge of the conspiracy, instead placed his army south of Dunama's. In the ensuing battle, fought at Ngala, Burkomanda thus accidentally attacked Dunama's forces and the mai was killed in battle.

Dunama's death confirmed the transfer of power to al-Kanemi, whose immense power was now unopposed. The shehu returned to Kukawa, but had no intention to proclaim himself as the new mai. Instead, al-Kanemi presided at the installation of a new puppet mai, Dunama's younger brother Ibrahim IV Lefiami.
