= Umar III al-Maqdisi =

Mai of the Kanem–Bornu Empire
- Reign: 17th century (16–20 years) c. 1625–1645 (Note: Different king lists (girgams) and chronicles translated in the 19th–20th centuries give Umar slightly different regnal lengths: 16 years (Landeroin), 18 years (Urvoy), 19 years (Palmer), and 19 years and 9 months (Barth). Nachtigal omits Umar. As a result of this, and due to different calculations for other mais, various dates have been given for his reign, including 1625–1645 (Barth), 1625–1644 (Palmer), 1639–1657 (Urvoy), and 1619–1635 (Landeroin). Cohen (1966) considered a reign of 18 years to be most likely. Both Stewart (1989) and Bosworth (2012) followed Barth's dates, giving Umar's reign as 1625–1645.)
- Predecessor: Ibrahim III Gumsami
- Successor: Biri V or Ali III Walamma
- Died: c. 1645; Ngazargamu, Bornu
- Issue: Biri V Ali III Walamma
- Dynasty: Sayfawa dynasty
- Father: Idris IV Alooma
- Mother: Fusam (Note: Palmer and Urvoy rendered Umar's mother's name as Fusam. Barth spelled it Fishama. Cohen (1966) used Palmer and Urvoy's rendition.)

al-Ḥājj Umar III (ʿUmar bin Idrīs), called Umar al-Maqdisi and Umar Fusami, was mai (ruler) of the Kanem–Bornu Empire in the early-to-mid 17th century, ruling approximately 1625–1645. Umar's reign saw the fall of Bilala-ruled Kanem, though the region was secured by the general Dala Afuno.

== Life ==
Umar was a son of mai Idris IV Alooma. His mother was named Fusam. Umar became mai in the early 17th century, succeeding his half-brother Ibrahim III Gumsami. At some point during his reign, Umar made a pilgrimage to Mecca, hence the honorific al-Ḥājj. The German explorer Heinrich Barth, who visited Bornu in the 1850s, dated Umar's pilgrimage to 1642.

During Umar's reign, the Ottomans invaded Fezzan and sacked its capital, Murzuq. One of the princes of the Awlad Muhammad, Fezzan's ruling dynasty, fled to Bornu and sought refuge with the mai. The prince, Tahir, escaped with "twelve camels loads of gold," likely taken from the state treasury. On their way to Bornu, he had apparently blinded two of his own nephews, possibly to eliminate them as succession rivals. This angered the mai, who captured him, his followers, and his gold as they neared Bornu. Umar then tied Tahir and his men in sacks and drowned them in a river.

In c. 1630, the Wadai Sultanate drove the Bilala out of Kanem, which they had governed as vassals of the Kanem–Bornu Empire. The mai (Note: Records of these events do not mention the name of the ruling mai, but nearly all reconstructed regnal dates of the mais place 1630 within Umar's reign.) responded by sending the general Dala Afuno to secure the eastern side of Lake Chad. Dala was successful and was made viceroy of Kanem, establishing the so-called Dalatoa dynasty, which governed Kanem until the time of European colonisation.

Umar ruled for over a decade. He died at Ngazargamu and was succeeded as mai by one of his sons, either Biri V (whose historicity is disputed) or Ali III Walamma.
