= Biri V =

Mai of the Kanem–Bornu Empire
- Reign: 17th century (1 year?) c. 1645 (Note: Specific regnal years of rulers of the Kanem–Bornu Empire are calculated by backdating from known events using their regnal lengths and vary between sources. Landeroin dated Biri's reign to 1635–1636 and Urvoy dated it to 1657. The date 1645 used here derives from dating the start of Ali III's reign to c. 1644/1645, per Barth (1851), Palmer (1936), and Bosworth (2012).)
- Predecessor: Umar III al-Maqdisi
- Successor: Ali III Walamma
- Dynasty: Sayfawa dynasty
- Father: Umar III al-Maqdisi

Biri V (Biri bin ʿUmar) may have been a mai (ruler) of the Kanem–Bornu Empire in the mid-17th century. Biri is recorded only in a single source; he was either a briefly reigning ruler immediately before mai Ali III Walamma, or his name may have been an alternate name for Ali III that was misunderstood as a separate monarch.

== Sources and interpretation ==
Biri is recorded in a list of Kanem–Bornu rulers (girgam) translated by Moïse Landeroin in 1911. According to Landeroin's list, Biri was a son of mai Umar III al-Maqdisi and ruled for a single year after Umar, directly before mai Ali III Walamma (also a son of Umar). 19th-century scholars who published translated lists of Kanem–Bornu rulers, e.g. Heinrich Barth and Gustav Nachtigal, did not include a mai Biri in this position in the list. Later scholars have been divided in their approach: Richmond Palmer (1936) omitted Biri, whereas Yves Urvoy (1941) included him, assigning him a reign of less than a year.

In 1966, Ronald Cohen concluded that Biri was either a largely forgotten figure who ruled briefly before Ali III, the same person as Ali III, or inserted into Landeroin's regnal list by mistake.
