= Hamdan Dunamami =

Mai of the Kanem–Bornu Empire
- Reign: 18th century (12–23 years) c. 1717–1731 (Note: Different king lists (girgams) and chronicles translated in the 19th–20th centuries give Hamdan different regnal lengths: 12 years (Urvoy), 14 years (Barth, Palmer, Landeroin), and 23 years (Nachtigal). As a result of this, and due to different calculations for other mais, various dates have been given for his reign, including 1723–1736 (Barth), 1731–1747 (Palmer), 1738–1751 (Urvoy), 1713–1727 (Landeroin), and 1708–1731 (Nachtigal). Cohen (1966) considered a reign of 14 years to be the most likely, followed here. For unknown reasons, Bosworth (2012) assigned Hamdan a very short 5-year reign, dated to 1726–1731.)
- Predecessor: Dunama VII Martemarambi
- Successor: Muhammad VIII Ergama
- Died: c. 1731; Ngazargamu, Bornu
- Spouse: Fanna
- Issue: Muhammad VIII Ergama; Ali IV Kalirgima
- Dynasty: Sayfawa dynasty
- Father: Dunama VII Martemarambi

al-Ḥājj Hamdan (Ḥamdūn bin Dunama), also recorded as Dunama, Muhammad, (Note: Barth, Palmer, and Urvoy record Hamdan as Haj Hamdun. Landeroin records him as Dunama Hadji and (presumably mistakenly) inserts an additional Muhammad in the regnal list, hence this additional name. Nachtigal records Hamdan as Hadj Dunama.) and Haji, and nicknamed Dunamami (Note: "son of Dunama") and Lumlumma, (Note: "lord of Lumlum") was mai (ruler) of the Kanem–Bornu Empire in the first half of the 18th century, ruling approximately 1717–1731.

== Life ==
Hamdan was a son of mai Dunama VII Martemarambi, who he succeeded as mai in the first half of the 18th century. Little is recorded of Hamdan's reign. The German explorer Heinrich Barth, who visited Bornu in the 1850s, stated that Hamdan was "a pious and indolent king, who appears to have made a pilgrimage", hence the honorific al-Ḥājj. Although Hamdan's reign was remembered as one of peace and prosperity, he is known to have engaged in military campaigns against the Mandara Kingdom, located to the southwest of Bornu.

There is considerable variation in the regnal dates assigned to Hamdan; he may have ruled only for a few years or for over a decade, perhaps for over twenty years. He died at Ngazargamu and was succeeded as mai by his son Muhammad VIII Ergama.
