= Cross Kauwa =

- Location in Nigeria
- Coordinates: 12°56′42.9″N 13°40′18.7″E
- Country: Nigeria
- State: Borno State
- Local Government Area: Kukawa
- Time zone: UTC+1 (West Africa Time)

Cross Kauwa (sometimes referred to simply as Kauwa) is a town in the northeastern Nigerian state of Borno, east of the town of Kukawa. It is located within the Kukawa Local Government Area.

The town is located along a road that runs from Baga to the east (formerly at the shore of Lake Chad) and to Kukawa to the west. Another road leads south to Monguno. According to a 2007 report in The Sun (Nigeria), it is about an hour's drive from Monguno to Cross Kauwa.

Maina Maaji Lawan, a former governor of Borno State, and later a National Senator, was born in the town.
