= Ali V Minargema =

Mai of the Kanem–Bornu Empire
- Reign: 1846
- Predecessor: Ibrahim IV Lefiami
- Died: 1846; Minarge, Bornu
- Dynasty: Sayfawa dynasty
- Father: Ibrahim IV Lefiami
- Mother: Delatu

Ali V (ʿAlī bin Ibrāhīm), called Ali Minargema and Ali Delatumi, (Note: Also spelled Ali Dalatumi.) was the last mai of the Kanem–Bornu Empire, ruling in 1846. Ali was installed as mai by the Wadai Sultanate during a power struggle with shehu Umar Kura over control of the empire. His defeat and death was followed by Umar Kura abolishing the office of mai, which had existed for over a thousand years, and assuming sole power over the empire.

== Life ==
Ali was a son of mai Ibrahim IV Lefiami (r. 1817–1846). His mother was named Delatu (or Dalatu). Ibrahim served as a puppet ruler of the Kanem–Bornu Empire under the shehu Umar Kura and was killed in a civil war while he was attempting to restore the traditional power of the mai. Ibrahim had been supported in the conflict by the Wadai Sultanate. After Ibrahim's death, the Wadai forces proclaimed Ali as the new mai and installed him at Kukawa. Kukawa was the shehu's capital, which the Wadai forces had captured and devastated in the aftermath of Ibrahim's death.

Umar Kura fled north-west to join forces with his brother, 'Abd ar-Rahman. When the armies of Umar Kura and 'Abd ar-Rahman advanced to recapture Kukawa, the Wadai forces abandoned Ali and fled. Ali was left with only a small number of supporters, about 1,000 spearmen and 1,000 swordsmen, most of whom were of Kanembu Sugurti origin. After only 40 days in power, (Note: Richmond Palmer, a later British colonial supervisor in Nigeria, gave Ali's reign as 40 days. Other authors do not provide a number.) Ali engaged Umar Kura and 'Abd ar-Rahman's army in battle at Minarge, near the Yobe River. Umar Kura and 'Abd ar-Rahman quickly won the battle. Ali and many of his supporters were killed while retreating. Ali's body was thrown among the "fan-palms" of Minarge. The name Minargema is derived from the site of Ali's defeat. In later orally recited histories of the mais of Kanem–Bornu, Ali was remembered as "more brave than fire".

In the aftermath of Ali's death, Umar Kura abolished the office of mai and assumed sole power over the empire. In order to assert his power, Umar Kura destroyed Kafela, which had served as the seat of the mais since 1813, and had many members of the royal family (the Sayfawa dynasty, ruling for almost eight centuries) killed. Survivors of the royal family either fled from the country or were forced to swear allegiance to the shehu.
