= Kafela =

Capital of Kanem-Bornu from 1813 to 1846

Birni Kafela
- Location within Nigeria
- 12.50359°N 13.74984°E
- Type: Settlement
- Location: Borno State, Nigeria
- Region: Sahel
- Part of: Kanem–Bornu Empire

History
- Built: 1813
- Built by: Muhammad IX Ngileruma
- Abandoned: 1846

Birni Kafela, (Note: Birni means city, especially in the context of a capital city.) also called Kabela and Jadid, was the capital of the Kanem–Bornu Empire from 1813 to 1846. Kafela was founded by Muhammad IX Ngileruma as the new imperial capital after the former capital, Ngazargamu, was destroyed in the Fula jihads.

== History ==
The former capital of the Kanem–Bornu Empire, Ngazargamu, was destroyed in 1808 by the Fulani. Although the ruins were briefly reoccupied by mai Dunama IX Lefiami, they were soon left abandoned due to repeated Fulani attacks directed in the area. Dunama fled east but failed to decide upon a new permanent capital, instead moving his court every few months. The failure to select a new permanent seat was among several factors that contributed to a group of leading courtiers deposing Dunama in 1811, replacing him as mai with his uncle Muhammad IX Ngileruma. The mais were swiftly falling under the influence of the prominent military leader and religious scholar Muhammad al-Amin al-Kanemi.

In 1813, Ngileruma founded Kafela as the new permanent capital of the empire. Kafela was sometimes referred to as Birni Jadid, meaning "new Birni" (the previous Birni being Birni Ngazargamu). Kafela was located relatively close to al-Kanemi's seat at Ngurno. The site of Kafela may have been chosen to profit of the potash trade, which traditionally passed through the area. Kafela was the residence of the mai and likely also the majority of the empire's aristocracy. Unlike Ngazargamu, Kafela had no structures built with fire bricks.

Kafela was retained as the capital upon Dunama's restoration to the throne in 1814. Kafela remained the seat of the mai until 1846, though al-Kanemi and his son Umar Kura (who used the style shehu) gradually became more powerful than the monarchs. In 1846, mai Ali V Minargema fought against Umar Kura to reassert the power of the mai but was defeated and killed. Umar Kura had Kafela destroyed and then took full power of the empire. Kukawa, Umar's seat, became the empire's new capital.
