= Kukawa =

LGA and town in Borno State, Nigeria

- Town and Local Government Area
- Interactive map of Kukawa
- Location in Nigeria
- Coordinates: 12°55′30″N 13°34′06″E
- Country: Nigeria
- State: Borno State
- Founded: 1814
- Founded by: Muhammad al-Amin al-Kanemi
- Headquarters: Kukawa

Population (2006)
  - Total: 203,864
- Time zone: UTC+1 (WAT)

Kukawa is a town and Local Government Area in the northeastern Nigerian state of Borno, close to Lake Chad. Kukawa was originally founded as Kuka in the early 19th century by the military leader and religious scholar Muhammad al-Amin al-Kanemi. The town once served as the capital of the Kanem–Bornu Empire in 1846–1893.

== History ==
=== Early history (1814–1846) ===
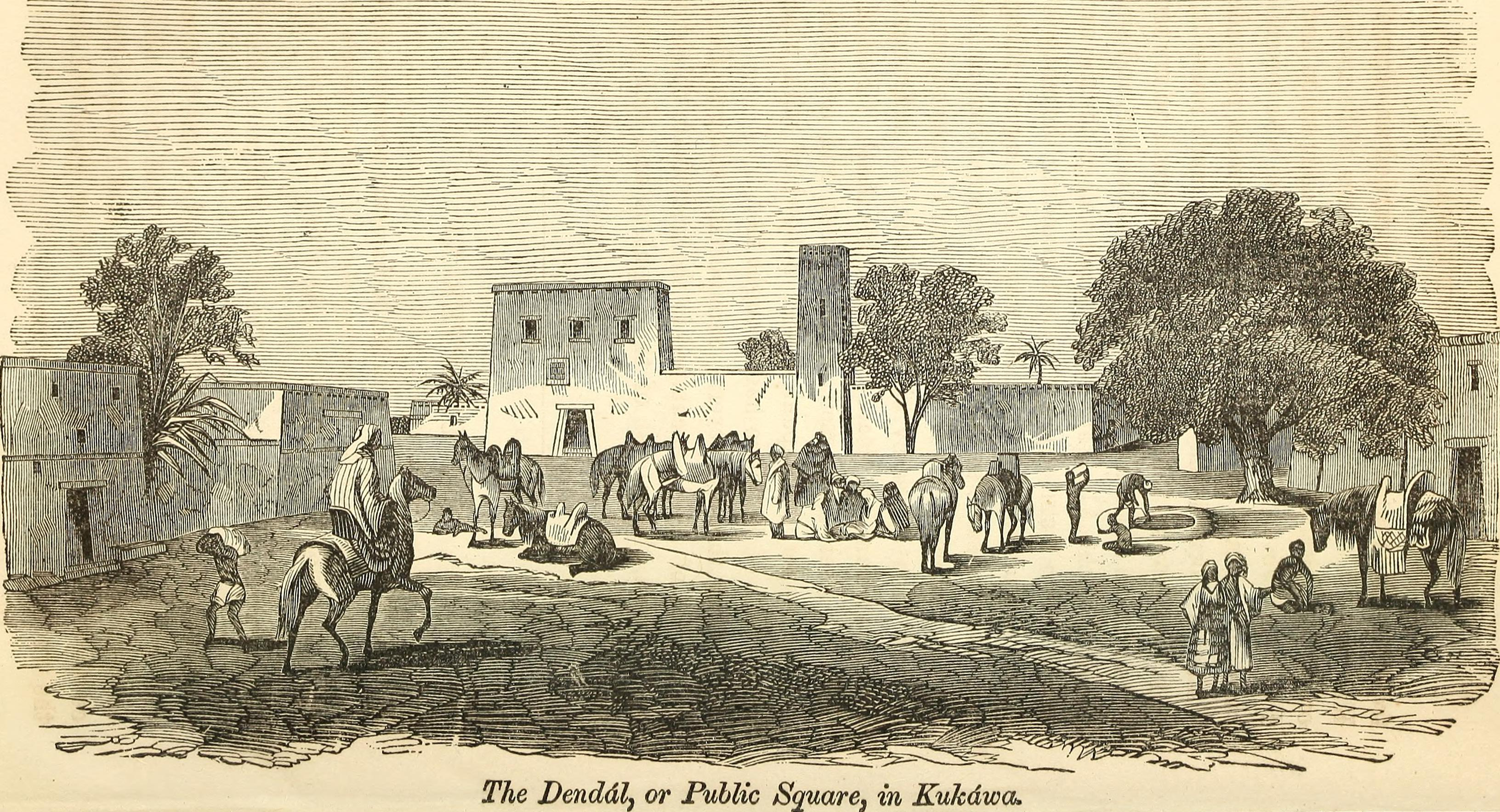
Central square of Kukawa in 1851

Kukawa was founded under the name Kuka in 1814 by Muhammad al-Amin al-Kanemi, a military leader and religious scholar in service of the Kanem–Bornu Empire. Al-Kanemi was one of the empire's most powerful feudal lords, having secured great wealth and many fiefs through his military efforts against the Fula jihads. His move from his former seat (Ngurno) to the new Kuka coincided with adopting a more independent attitude to the empire's monarch (mai), Dunama IX Lefiami. Al-Kanemi adopted the style of shehu ("sheikh") at around the same time. Kuka was the end of one of the main trans-Saharan trade routes to Tripoli on the Mediterranean coast.

The name Kuka (or Kaoukaou) is the Kanuri name for the African baobab, which grew extensively in the surrounding countryside. The use of the name for the modern settlement has caused some confusion, since both Muhammad al-Idrisi (12th century) and Ibn Khaldun (14th century) mention two prominent towns by the name of Kaou Kaou, one of which was located very close to modern-day Kukawa.

Al-Kanemi and his son and successor Umar Kura increased their power over the course of the early 19th century, to the detriment of the mais. In 1846, mai Ibrahim IV Lefiami attempted to reassert his traditional power against Umar Kura. Ibrahim was supported in the ensuing civil war by the Wadai Sultanate, whose forces captured and destroyed Kuka. Ibrahim and his son Ali V Minargema were ultimately defeated. In the aftermath, Umar Kura seized sole power over the empire; the capital of the mais, Kafela, was destroyed and Kuka, as Umar Kura's seat, transitioned into the new imperial capital.

=== Capital of Kanem–Bornu (1846–1893) ===
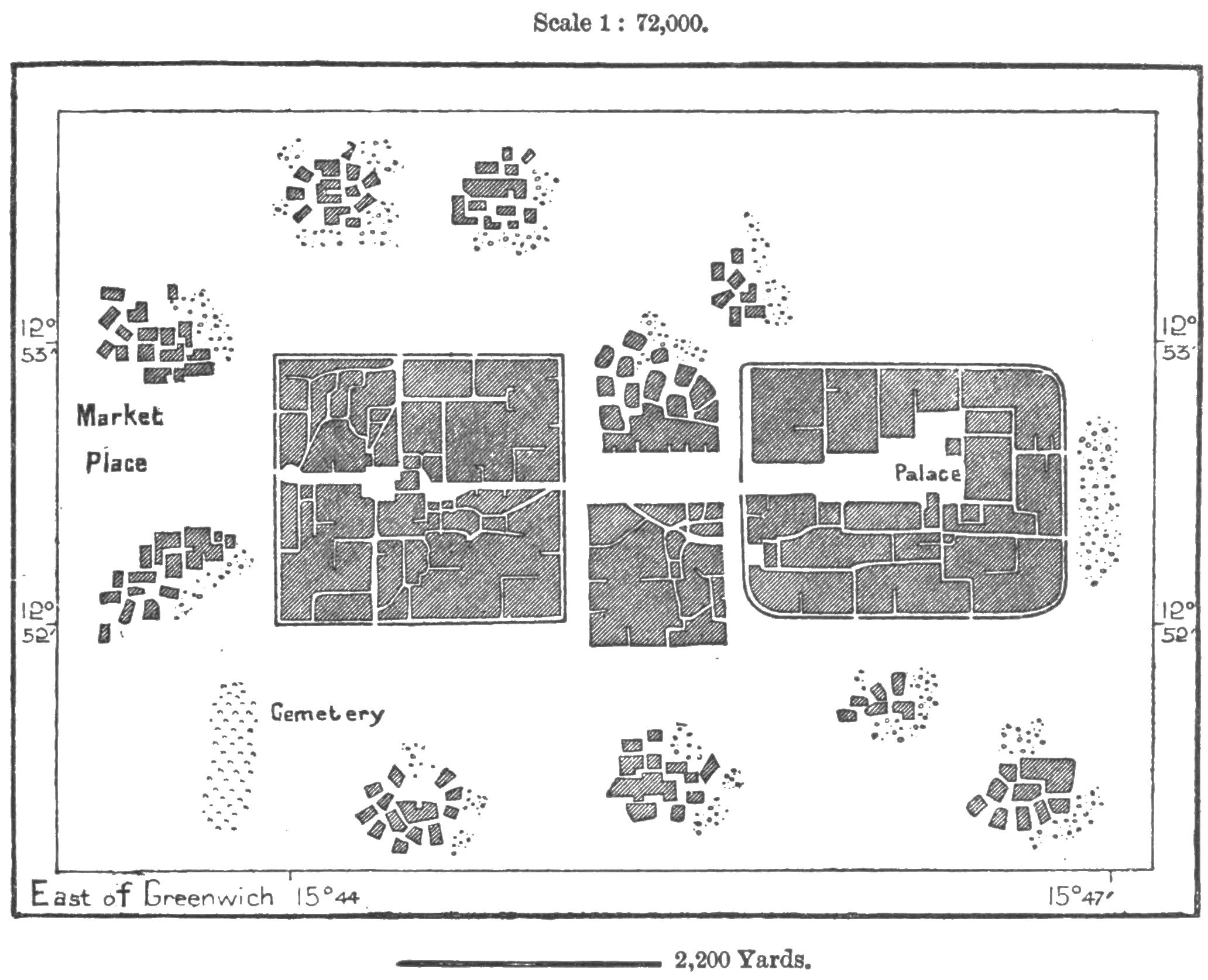
1892 map of Kukawa by Élisee Reclus

After securing his power, Umar Kura rebuilt Kuka. The settlement was rebuilt as two towns, separated by about half a mile of open country and each surrounded by a wall of white clay. This may be the explanation for why the town came to be known as Kukawa (the plural form of Kuka). The two parts of Kukawa were known as Kuka Futebe ("West Town") and Kuka Gedibe ("East Town"). The shehu and "other important persons" lived in the eastern town. The space separating the two towns was named the gemzegenyi (meaning unclear). It is unknown why Umar Kura rebuilt Kuka as two towns; Kukawa was the only pre-colonial center in Borno to be built in this fashion. The reasons may lie in Umar Kura wishing to enhance his personal security, or to cement class differences between commoners and the elite.

The rebuilt towns had numerous houses, wells, markets, and palaces. The entire area was surrounded by a 20-foot (6 m) high exterior mud wall. In addition to the two towns, this wall also enclosed several smaller villages and farms, as well as a cemetery. In the late 19th century, Kukawa had a population of between 60,000 and 200,000. The town grew wealthy as a center for caravans and a stopping place for pilgrims from the west and south on their way to Mecca.

Kukawa was visited by German explorer Heinrich Barth in 1851 who travelled from Tripoli seeking to open trade with Europe and explore Africa, and again in 1892 by the French explorer Parfait-Louis Monteil, who was checking the borders between areas of West Africa assigned to the French and the British by the Treaty of Berlin.

In 1892/1893, the Kanem–Bornu Empire was invaded by the Sudanese warlord Rabih az-Zubayr. Rabih defeated the Kanem–Bornu forces and captured and destroyed Kukawa in May 1893; the town was plundered and burned and its people were killed, enslaved, or dispersed. Rabih spent some time in Kukawa but then settled on Dikwa as his new capital due to Dikwa's better communications and water supply.

=== Later history (1893–present) ===
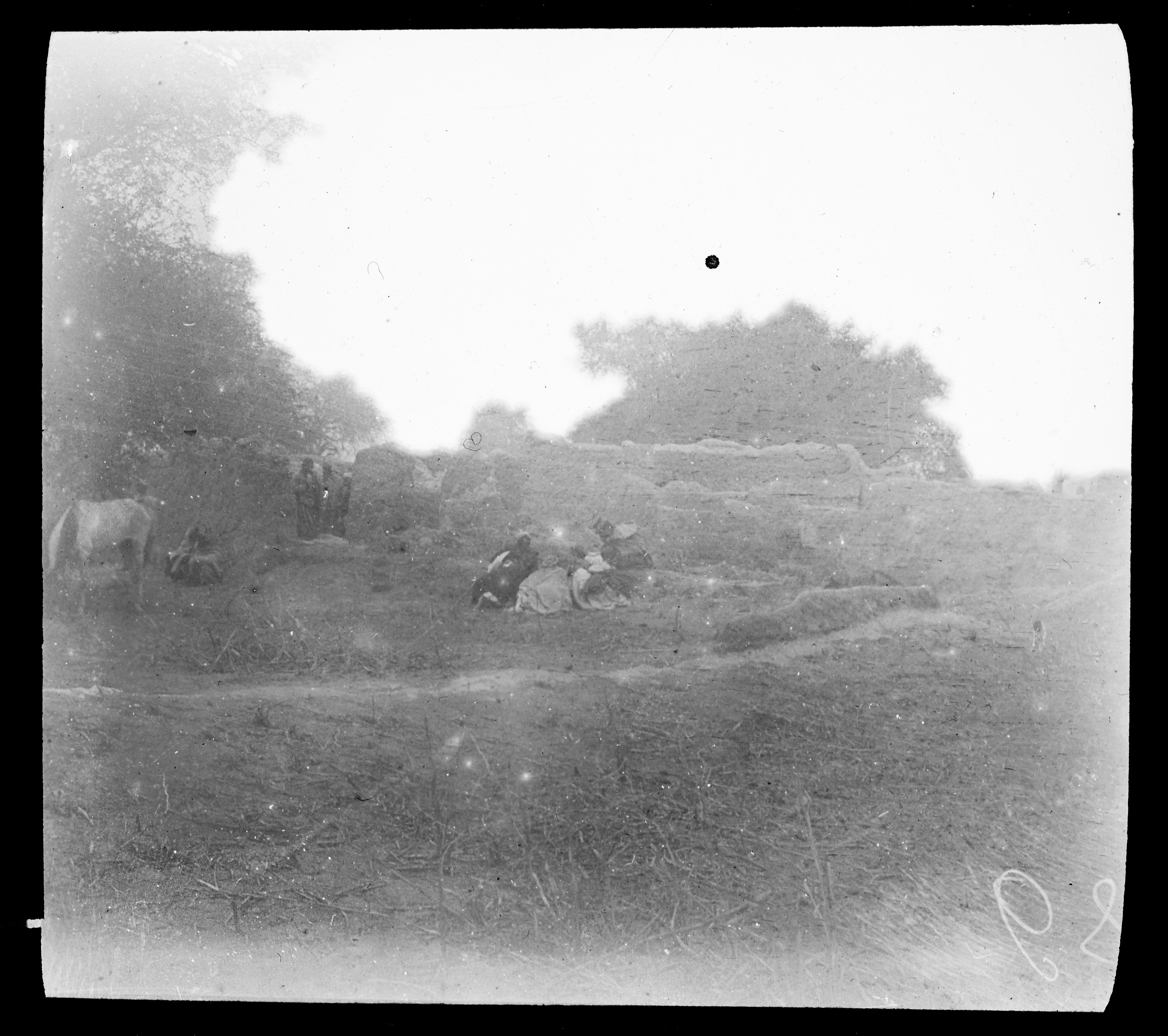
Ruins in Kukawa, 1900

As the British colonisation of Nigeria was progressing, it was in the early 20th century intended to rebuild Kukawa to serve as the seat of shehu Abubakar Garbai, descendant of the earlier shehus and the figurehead ruler of "British Borno". In 1903, Abubakar Garbai took up residence in the ruins of Kukawa, turned into a garrison town by the British, and was invested as shehu there by Frederick Lugard in 1904. There were several issues with the project. Kukawa was no longer located along any major trade routes and had an inadequate water supply. The site had been left to fall into decay in the years since Rabih's invasion and was by this point little more than "one large cornfield", situated an inconvenient distance away from the major British-controlled settlements. In 1907, Abubakar Garbai moved his residence away to Yerwa (modern-day Maiduguri).

Kukawa remained neglected over the course of the following decades. In 1931, a European visitor wrote that Kukawa was desolate and "of little interest", and a place where "ruins outnumber the houses".

==== Boko Haram insurgency ====
In recent years Kukawa has been affected by insurgency and insecurity due to the activities of Boko Haram. The area has witnessed displacement of people and destruction of infrastructure. Efforts by the Nigerian military and international organizations have aimed at restoring peace and resettling displaced persons.

On 16 January 2015, the "caretaker chairman of Kukawa Local Government Area, Musa Alhaji Bukar Kukawa", speaking on behalf of the Kukawa residents who were displaced to Maiduguri following the 2015 Baga massacre, "called on the federal government to intensify military operations so that they can return to their homes." A massacre occurred in Kukawa in July 2015.

Hundreds of Kukawa citizens were held hostage by the Islamic State West Africa Province (ISWAP) in August 2020. Two million people in Borno have been displaced from their homes over the past ten years; many live in squalid conditions in Maiduguri.

== Local Government Area ==
Kukawa is one of the sixteen LGAs that constitute the Borno Emirate, a traditional state located in Borno State, Nigeria. Other towns in the Kukawa Local Government Area include Cross Kauwa and Baga.

== Demographics and culture ==
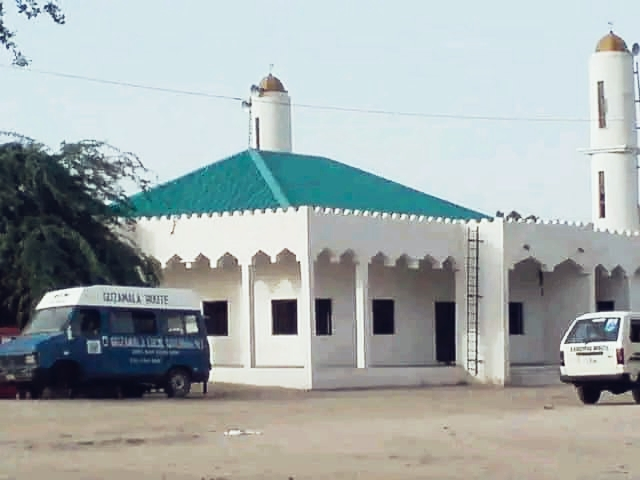
The central mosque in Kukawa

The population of Kukawa LGA consists mainly of Kanuri, Shuwa Arabs, and other ethnic groups native to the Lake Chad region. The Kanuri language is widely spoken, along with Hausa and Arabic in some areas. The people of Kukawa engage in agriculture, fishing and trade, with crops such as millet, sorghum, and vegetables being commonly cultivated. Traditional festivals, including Durbar celebrations are an important aspect of cultural life.

== Climate ==
The weather is dry, with only 400–500 mm (16–20 in) of rainfall, with hot and rainy summers and dry and pleasant winters, with temperatures between 15 °C (59 °F) and 42 °C (107 °F) and infrequently falling below 12 °C (53 °F) or rising over 44 °C (112 °F).

Heat waves, extreme weather, and rising temperatures are caused by climate change, although its effects are not uniform worldwide.
