= Dunama VII Martemarambi =

Mai of the Kanem–Bornu Empire
- Reign: 17th/18th century (15–19 years) c. 1699–1717 (Note: Different king lists (girgams) and chronicles translated in the 19th–20th centuries give Dunama slightly different regnal lengths: 15 years (Urvoy), 18 years (Palmer, Nachtigal), or 19 years (Barth, Landeroin). As a result of this, and due to different calculations for other mais, various dates have been given for his reign, including 1704–1722 (Barth), 1699–1717 (Palmer), 1711–1726 (Urvoy), 1694–1713 (Landeroin), and 1690–1708 (Nachtigal). Cohen (1966) considered a reign of 18 years most likely, followed here. For unknown reasons, Bosworth (2012) assigned Dunama a long 27-year reign, dated to 1699–1726.)
- Predecessor: Idris V
- Successor: Hamdan Dunamami
- Died: c. 1717; Ngazargamu or Dikwa, Bornu
- Issue: Hamdan Dunamami
- Dynasty: Sayfawa dynasty
- Father: Ali III Walamma

Dunama VII (Note: Some chronologies of Kanem–Bornu rulers omit the 14th-century Dunama III, lowering the regnal numbers of later rulers of this name. This ruler is then considered Dunama VI.) (Dunama bin ʿAlī), called Dunama Martemarambi (Note: "Dunama, son of the lands of Marte") and (erroneously) Dunama Umarmi, (Note: "Dunama, son of Umar") was mai (ruler) of the Kanem–Bornu Empire in the late 17th and/or early 18th century, ruling approximately 1699–1717.

== Life ==
Dunama was a son of mai Ali III Walamma and succeeded his brother Idris V as mai in the late 17th or early 18th century. The major event of Dunama's reign recorded in later royal chronicles was a long seven-year famine.

Dunama ruled for over a decade, between 15 and 19 years. He died at Ngazargamu or Dikwa and was succeeded as mai by his son Hamdan Dunamami.
