= Ahmad Alimi =

Mai of the Kanem–Bornu Empire
- Reign: 1791–1808 (Note: There is general agreement across sources that Ahmad ruled for 17 years. His reign is sometimes alternatively dated to 1793–1810, based on an erroneous dating of the fall of Ngazargamu to 1810.)
- Predecessor: Ali IV Kalirgima
- Successor: Dunama IX Lefiami
- Died: c. 1808
- Spouse: Lefiya
- Issue: Dunama IX Lefiami; Ibrahim IV Lefiami
- Dynasty: Sayfawa dynasty
- Father: Ali IV Kalirgima
- Mother: Amina

Ahmad (Aḥmad bin ʿAlī), called Ahmad Alimi, was the mai (ruler) of the Kanem–Bornu Empire in 1791–1808. Ahmad was a pious, learned, and compassionate ruler, though not an experienced military man. Late in his reign, Ahmad proved unable to resist an invasion of the empire by the Fulani during the Fula jihads, culminating in the loss of Ngazargamu, the imperial capital. In the aftermath of Ngazargamu's fall, Ahmad abdicated in favor of his son Dunama IX Lefiami and died a few months later.

== Life ==
Ahmad Alimi was a son of mai Ali IV Kalirgima, who he succeeded as mai in 1791. Ahmad's mother was named Amina, "the daughter of Talba". Ahmad was regarded as a pious and gentle scholar, not a military man. Heinrich Barth, a German explorer who visited Bornu in 1851, stated that the royal chronicles recorded Ahmad as "a learned prince, liberal towards the ulama, a prodigal dispenser of alms, a friend of science and religion, gracious and compassionate towards the poor". The Kanem–Bornu Empire had become severely weakened by Ahmad's time. In the decades prior to Ahmad's reign, the empire had suffered defeats against the Mandara Kingdom to the southwest. The empire may have suffered from a plague during Ahmad's reign, leaving it vulnerable to attack. According to Barth, this plague had killed many people and had been foretold through a solar eclipse two years before it began.

Near the end of Ahmad's reign, by 1807 at the latest, the Kanem–Bornu Empire became threatened by the Fula jihads. In c. 1807, Fula people in Daura revolted against the local governor and swore allegiance to Usman dan Fodio, leader of the Fulani jihad movement. Ahmad sent assistance to Daura, attacked the rebels, and ordered an anti-Fula campaign throughout the state. Ahmad then began a correspondence with Usman dan Fodio and his son Muhammed Bello, inquiring of the cause of the attacks. Ahmad stated that his people were Muslim, that he considered himself to be the Commander of the Faithful in Bornu, and that the attacks were thus unjust. Usman replied that he had not known of the conflict in Daura and invited the mai to join him in their struggle. Ahmad refused since the Fulani had engaged in hostility against him and his people.

The conflict with the Fulani escalated into full-scale war. In 1808, the Fulani drove Ahmad's forces out of Nguru, which left the way open to Ngazargamu, the Kanem–Bornu capital. In March 1808, the Fulani captured and destroyed Ngazargamu. The imperial treasury, and some captured royal princesses, were sent as spoils of war to Usman dan Fodio. Ahmad had escaped from the capital with as many of his family and courtiers as he could gather. Their party made their way as far east as they could get, close to Lake Chad. There, Ahmad gathered his advisors to decide the next course of action. Most of the empire south and west of the destroyed capital had also been devastated by the Fulani, leaving the state on the brink of collapse.

By 1808, Ahmad was an elderly ruler and had become blind with age. He thus decided to abdicate in favor of his son, Dunama IX Lefiami. Many of Ahmad's advisors accepted the abdication only reluctantly since it was improper for a mai to end their reign before death. Ahmad died just a few months after his abdication, probably in 1808. It is unclear where Ahmad died and where he was buried. Some accounts incorrectly place his death at Ngazargamu. A girgam (regnal list) translated by Richmond Palmer in 1912 merely states that Ahmad was buried "in the camp".
