= Ngurno =

Village in Nigeria

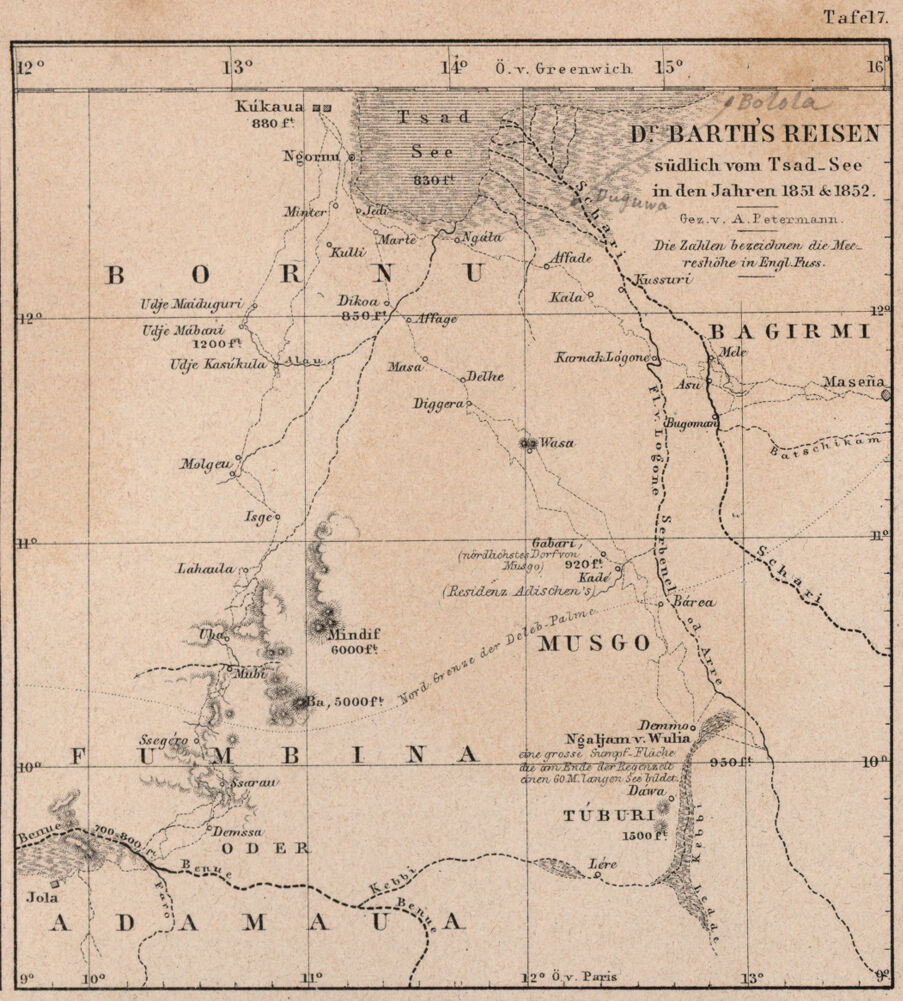
A German map of J. H. Barth's 1850s travels in Bornu, showing "Ngornu" directly on the shore of a southern extension of Lake Chad.

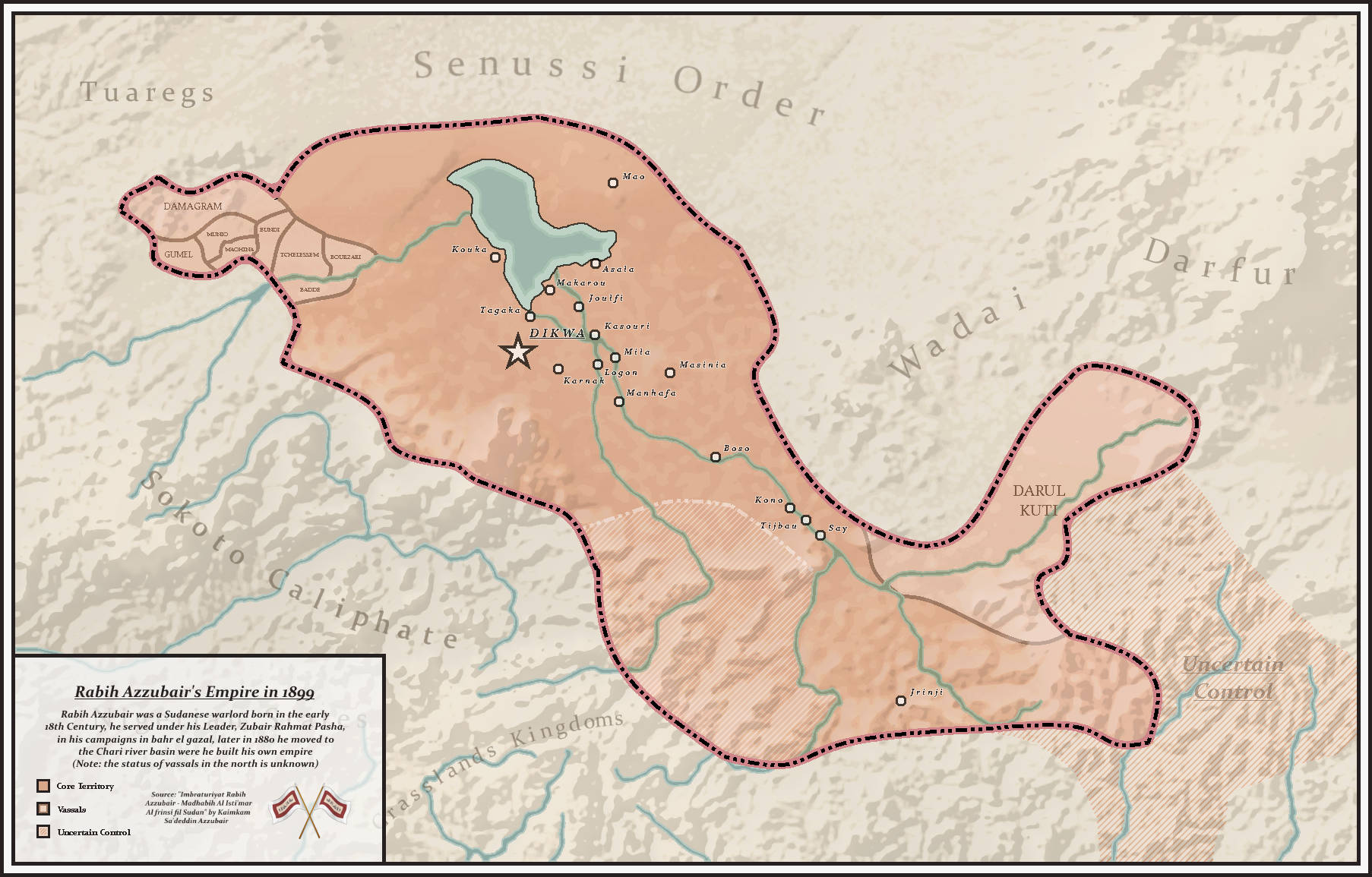
A map of Rabih az-Zubayr's Bornu Empire in 1899, showing the area of Ngurno submerged beneath Lake Chad, southeast of Kukawa.

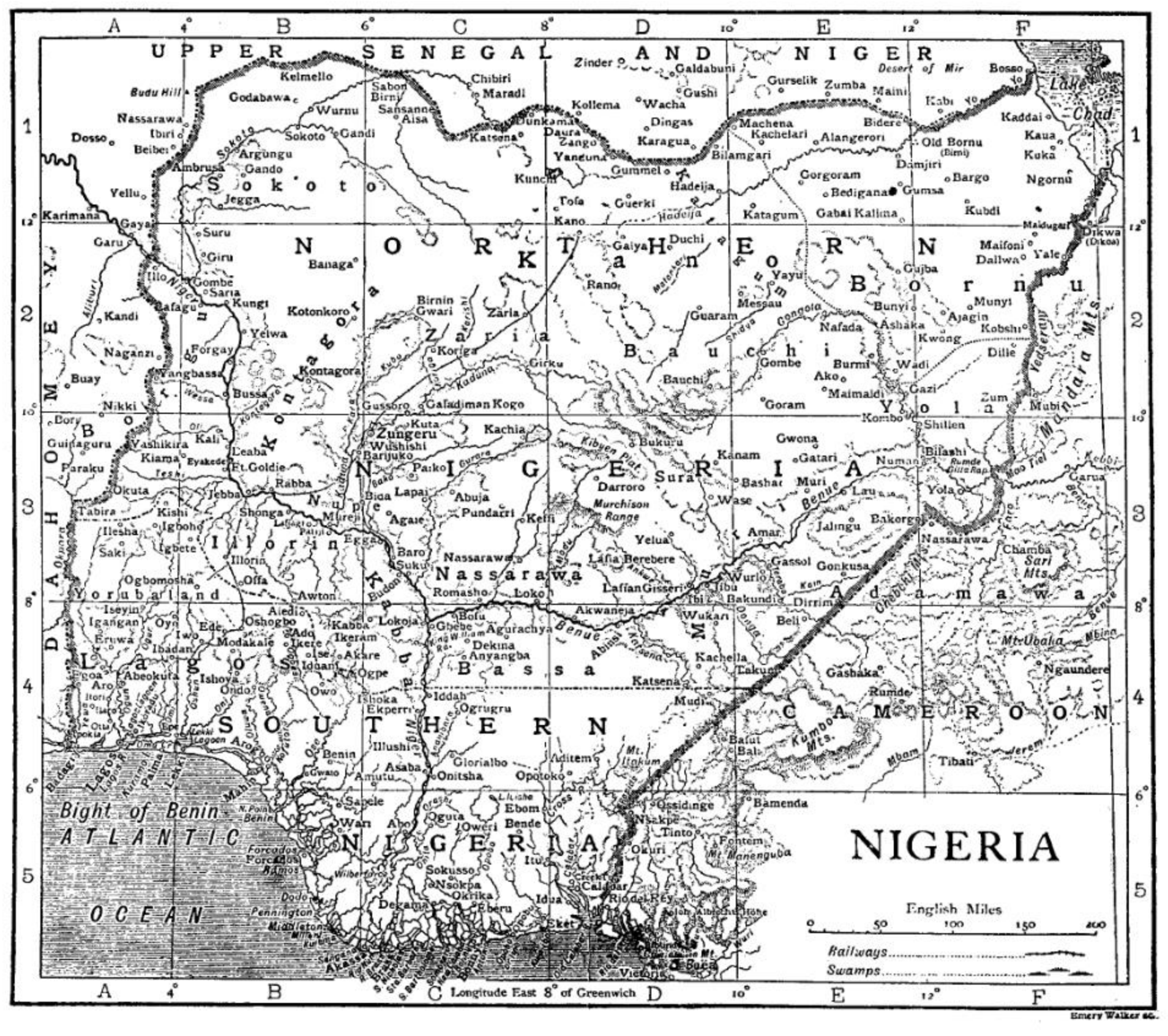
British Nigeria in 1911, showing "Ngornu" still serving as a regional center near Lake Chad.

Ngurno ("Blessing") is a village in far northeastern Nigeria. It is administered as part of the Monguno LGA within Borno State and was formerly an important trading center of the Bornu Empire and Emirate.

== History ==
Formerly known as Angorno, Ngorno, and Ngornu, Ngurno was a major trading center of Bornu during the 19th century, when its resident population was estimated at 30,000. This was substantially augmented on market days, when traders in cotton, amber, metals, coral, and slaves would visit. At the time, Lake Chad was nearby and frequently submerged the floodplain separating it from Ngurno. (See Lake Chad flooded savanna.) The city's importance waned following major floods that submerged the city itself and the British conquest of the area, which they organized as part of Nigeria under the local administration of Maiduguri to the southwest.

== See also ==
- List of villages in Borno State
