= Ngazargamu =

Capital of Kanem-Bornu from the 15th to the 19th century

Birni Ngazargamu
- Location within Nigeria
- 13°05′N 12°22′E
- Type: Settlement
- Location: Yobe State, Nigeria
- Region: Sahel
- Part of: Kanem–Bornu Empire

History
- Built: 15th century
- Built by: Ali I Gaji
- Abandoned: 1808/1809

Site notes
- Condition: Ruined

Birni Ngazargamu , (Note: Birni means city, especially in the context of a capital city.) also called Gazargamu, Gazargamo, Ngazargamo, and N'gazargamu, was the capital of the Kanem–Bornu Empire from the city's foundation in the 15th century to its destruction and abandonment in the Fula jihads in the early 19th century. Ngazargamu was situated in the fork of the Komadugu Gana River and the Komadugu Yobe, near present-day Geidam, 150 km (93 mi) west of Lake Chad in the Yobe State of modern Nigeria.

Ideally positioned alongside important trans-Saharan trade routes, Ngazargamu was the focal point of the central Sudan region for three centuries. At the height of its power, Ngazargamu covered about 1500 hectares. The former population size of Ngazargamu is unknown, with estimates ranging between 60,000 and 250,000 at the city's height. The great rampart on which the city once stood is still visible at the site, alongside sparse remnants of former structures. The site is noted for the presence of red bricks, otherwise rare in pre-modern Africa.

== Toponymy ==
According to the British colonial supervisor H. R. Palmer in 1926, the first segment of Ngazargamu, which is N'gasar, indicates that the earlier residents of the area were known as either N'gasar or N'gizim. The latter segment of the word, gamu or kumu, shares similarities with the initial portion of the name Gwombe and can signify either (i) a leader or monarch or (ii) a revered ancestral spirit. More recent proposals for the etymology of Ngazargamu include meanings such as "the secure city", "the place of three fortresses", or "the city of kings".

Based on the Kanuri pronunciation, the correct spelling of the city's name is Birni Gazargamo. The spellings N'gazargamu or Birnin Gazargamu are likely of Hausa origin.

== History ==
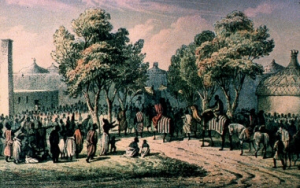
Modern artistic depiction of Ngazargamu in the reign of Ali I Gaji

The Kanem–Bornu Empire experienced severe instability during the 14th–15th centuries, plagued by both internal and external conflict. The empire's original capital in the Kanem region, east of Lake Chad, was Njimi. In the 14th century, Njimi was captured by the Bilala people, forcing the ruling Sayfawa dynasty of Kanem–Bornu to flee from the empire's former heartland. Kanem–Bornu lacked a permanent capital for some time and experienced repeated civil war between rival branches of the ruling dynasty. The victor in the wars was Ali I Gaji, who managed to consolidate his power in the later half of the 15th century.

The culmination of Ali I Gaji's reign was the establishment of Ngazargamu as the first substantial capital since the loss of Njimi. Ngazargamu was ideally positioned at the southern terminus of the trans-Saharan trade routes, and closer to emerging trade centers in Hausaland than previous sites from which the Kanem–Bornu rulers exerted power. Ngazargamu was also located at the heart of a salt-producing region in Bornu, salt being a very profitable trade resource. The city emerged as a major trading hub within the Sudan region. By the 17th century, the city's markets attracted caravans from various directions: Tunis, Tripoli, and Cairo in the north; Timbuktu, Awdaghust, Agades, and Gao in the west; and Kordofan and the Nile regions in the east. These trade caravans transported a variety of goods, including silk, carpets, weapons, and books from the Middle East; paper and glass beads from Venice; leather products, copperware, and tobacco from the Maghreb; and gold and kola nuts from Ashanti in the south.

A description of Ngazargamu at its height was given by one Mallam Salih ibn Ishaku and translated by H. R. Palmer in the 1920s:

At N'gazargamu [sic] there were six hundred and sixty roads cleared and widened, called Le. Sixty of these roads were well known to the Amir [Mai], for he traversed them, but many of the roads were unknown to the Amir since he did not traverse them and so did not know them . . . There were four Friday mosques. Each of these mosques had an Imam for Friday who led the Friday prayer with the people. At each mosque there were twelve thousand worshippers.

=== Destruction ===
In 1808, Ngazargamu was captured and destroyed by the Fulani, who warred against Kanem–Bornu during the Fula jihads. The ruler of Kanem–Bornu, Ahmad Alimi, fled east and abdicated in favor of his son, Dunama IX Lefiami. With the aid of military leader and religious scholar Muhammad al-Amin al-Kanemi, Dunama was able to rally his forces and repel the Fulani. Dunama was restored to power later in 1808 or early 1809, establishing himself in the ruins of Ngazargamu and beginning efforts to pacify the surrounding country. In the latter half of 1809, Dunama fled the capital when it was approached by the Fulani leader Ibrahim Zaki. Although this invasion would eventually also be repelled, Dunama decided not to return to Ngazargamu due to the repeated threats to the site. Dunama failed to decide upon a new permanent capital, instead moving around every few months. In the early 1810s, Dunama's uncle (and a usurper) Muhammad IX Ngileruma selected Kafela as the new capital.

== Layout and ruins ==
Little is currently known of Ngazargamu's physical appearance when it was an inhabited city. Ngazargamu stood on an enormous and roughly circular earth rampart. The rampart is still visible at the city's location, standing about 7 metres (23 ft) high. A circular wall once stood on this rampart, surrounding the city, with an approximate diameter of two kilometres (1.24 miles). There were five entrances to the city and traces of a ditch can be seen in a few places outside of the rampart; it is possible that the entire city was surrounded by a ditch that has since been silted up. The current site preserves sparse remnants of Ngazargamu's walls. In most places these measure only a single course high, likely due to destruction by the Fulani and later destruction at the site in order to repurpose building material.

Within Ngazargamu there are several ruins of red brick buildings, including a large complex in the city's center and smaller structures scattered throughout. Red bricks are rare in pre-modern African archaeological sites but have also been found at Gambaru and N'guru (Nigeria), Garoumélé (Niger), and Tié (Chad), all sites having some association with the Kanuri people. The bricks may have been imported to Ngazargamu from elsewhere. The main complex at the center of Ngazargamu was very likely the palace of the mai (the ruler of the empire) and the other brick structures were presumably residences of other leading figures. The majority of the people of Ngazargamu may have lived in houses of sun-dried brick or grass huts, typical of the region, which have left no surface indications at the site.

In 2015, Ibrahim Gaidam, then governor of Yobe State, announced the formation of a committee restore, and conserve the ruins of Ngazargamu, and to work on developing and promoting the site as a cultural center and potential World Heritage Site. In 2018, plans were announced to rebuild the city as a cultural site, where Ngazargamu's former social life, administration, commerce, and rich Islamic knowledge could be showcased. The Yobe State government hoped that the project could serve to attract both tourists and researchers.
