= Susam of Kanem =

Legendary founder of Kanem

Susam

Mai of the Kanem–Bornu Empire
- Reign: c. 700 (20 years)
- Successor: Biram
- Spouse: Aisa (legendary)
- Issue: Biram
- Dynasty: Duguwa dynasty
- Father: Dī Yazan (legendary)
- Mother: Aisa (legendary)

Susam, Sebu, or Sef was the legendary first mai (ruler) of the Kanem–Bornu Empire. Later legends credit Susam with uniting the local tribes of Kanem (modern-day southwestern Chad) and establishing the empire and its royal line. If a real historical figure, Susam would have ruled at the time of the empire's establishment, c. 700.

After the empire converted to Islam in the 11th century, legends of the ruling dynasty were Arabized and Susam was claimed to have been the 6th-century Himyarite prince Sayf ibn Dī Yazan, a medieval Islamic folk hero. Details of the Arabized legend are contradictory and were questioned as early as the 15th century.

== Historical record ==
Information about Susam comes from the girgam, the orally recited royal chronicle of the Kanem–Bornu Empire, which is mainly known through transcriptions and translations by European explorers, scholars, and colonial officials in various copies in the 19th and 20th centuries, most importantly by Heinrich Barth, Moïse Landeroin, and Gustav Nachtigal. Richmond Palmer later worked with the same material as Barth, with some additions, and Yves Urvoy also published a study in the 1940s attempting to reconcile various sources. Because the long timespan separating Susam from recorded history and the lack of contemporary evidence, Susam and his dynasty (the Duguwa dynasty) are generally treated as legendary figures of uncertain historicity.

Barth, Landeroin, and Nachtigal all agree that Susam ruled for 20 years, and Palmer and Urvoy do not give any dates.

== Arabized legend ==
=== Sayf ibn Dī Yazan ===
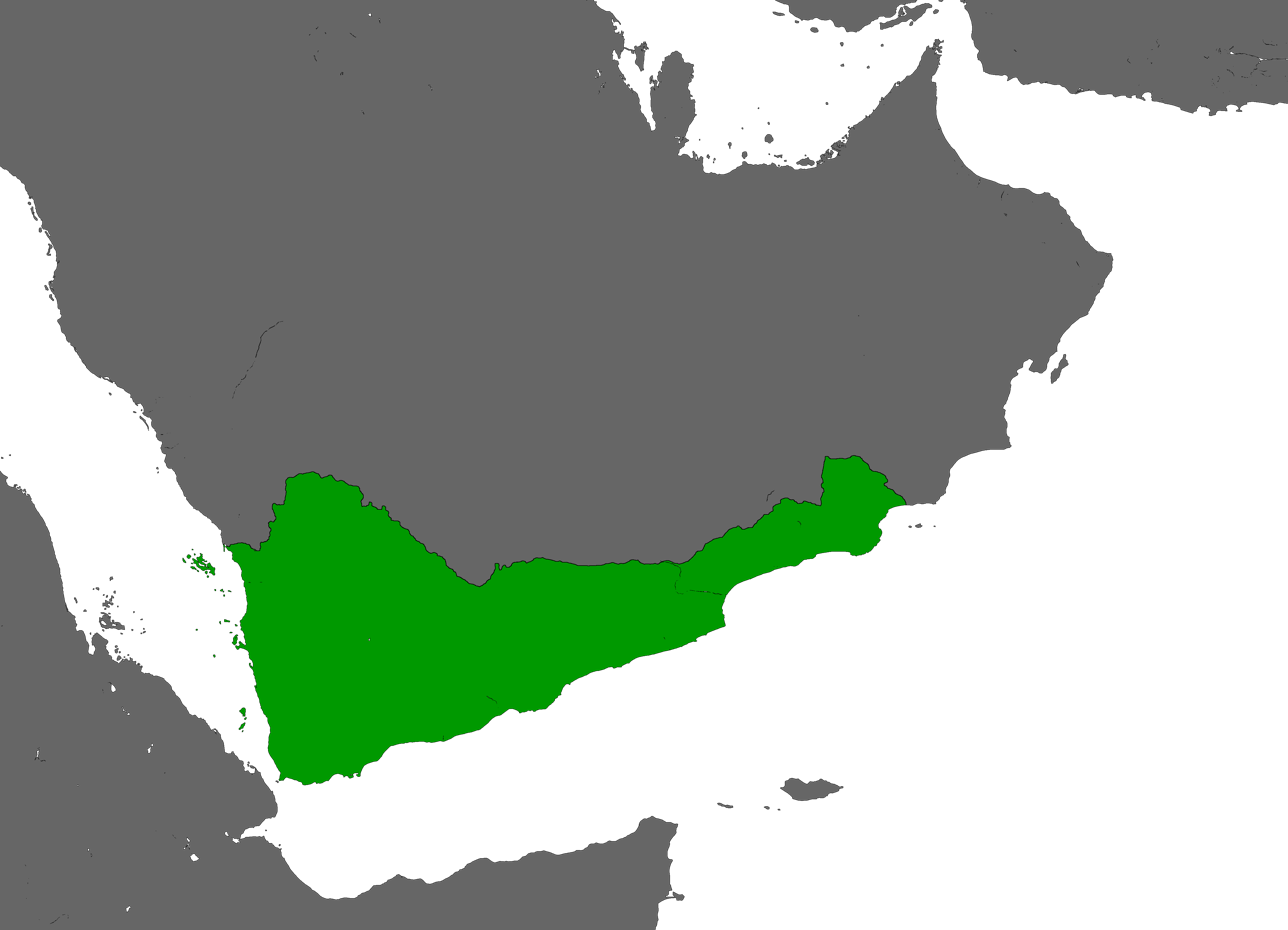
Arabized legends of Kanem's foundation connect Susam to the ancient Himyarite Kingdom

In the late 11th century, the rulers of Kanem converted to Islam and there was a dynastic shift from the Duguwa to the Sayfawa dynasty. The first Sayfawa mai, Hummay, is contradictingly recorded both as the founder of a new dynasty and as the son of his (Duguwa) predecessor, Selema I. Barth (1857) speculated that the "dynastic shift" was due to differences in religion, rather than a break in the royal line. It was common for Islamic dynasties in medieval Africa to claim Arab origin as a source of prestige. The prologue of the girgam, written down only after centuries of Sayfawa rule, names the dynastic founder of the royal line Sayf ibn Dī Yazan. This name was apparently taken from a semi-legendary pre-Islamic 6th-century Yemeni prince who fled from Yemen when Himyar was conquered by the Kingdom of Aksum. Sayf ibn Dī Yazan was remembered as a hero in later medieval Islamic legend. The Sayfawa claim of descent from Sayf ibn Dī Yazan is also found outside the girgam, having been recorded by some medieval Arab scholars, such as Ibn Sa'id al-Maghribi (13th century) and Ahmad ibn Majid (15th century).

The full name Sayf ibn Dī Yazan appears only in the prologue of the girgam. In the main portion of the text, written in an annalistic style, he is recorded only as Sayf or Sef, without the suffix ibn Dī Yazan ("son of Dī Yazan"). In other king lists of Kanem–Bornu he is also only recorded as Sayf or Sef. In lists of rulers of the Bilala around Lake Fitri, who claimed dynastic connections to the Sayfawa, he is recorded as Muhammad Sef Allah. Kanuri oral king lists and traditions record him under various names, including Sef, Sebu, and Saibu. Modern scholars have sometimes used alternate spellings or names with little elaboration, such as Séf (Barth, 1857), Seif (Landeroin, 1911), and Susam (Venning, 2023).

The girgam's account of Sayf differs from the Yemeni figure and folk hero in important aspects. The girgam's genealogy connects Sayf to the biblical patriarchs through northern Arabian figures, rather than southern Arabian figures as expected for a Yemeni prince. The Egyptian scholar al-Qalqashandi questioned the Sayfawa version of Sayf's genealogy already in the 15th century. Ahmad bin Furtu, Grand Imam of the Kanem–Bornu Empire, endorsed the genealogy as accurate in the 16th century. The prologue also states, depending on the version, that Sayf or his mother was a child of the "king of Baghdad", further contradicting the tale of the Yemeni Sayf ibn Dī Yazan. Sayf was claimed to have traveled from Arabia to Kanem, united the local tribes there, and established a kingdom and a dynasty. According to Barth (1857):

Séf is said to have come to Kánem, where he founded a new dynasty, and reigned over several tribes; viz. the Berbers (Begháma?), Tebu, or Tedá, Kánembú, and others. Imám A'hmed states expressly that he came to Njímiye.

Barth further stated that Séf was said to have died at "Sámina", which he identified as possibly in the territory of the Daju people. The origin chronicles describe Sayf as "the greatest of sultans" or "the great sultan", and as "king of the world in his time in its four directions" or "king of the four corners of the earth in the age in which he lived".

One version of the girgam, translated by Palmer in 1912, designates Duku (otherwise the third mai) as the first mai in Kanem and includes Sayf (as Sebu) only as an ancestor figure who "came from Yemen" and "is [buried] in Yemen". A girgam translated by Palmer in 1926 places Sayf's deat at "Sima", which Palmer translates to Njimi, the capital of Kanem.

=== Family ===
As indicated by his name, the legendary Sayf was the son of a man named Dī Yazan. Landeroin contradictingly names him Seif ben Abdallah and names his father as Abdallah ben Aïssata. Barth and Urvoy state that Sayf was the son of a woman from Mecca. Palmer gives her the name Aisa. One of the girgams translated by Palmer records Sayf as Sebu Aisami, "Sebu, son of Aisa". The next ruler of Kanem, Biram, is consistently presented as Sayf's son. Biram's mother is not named by Palmer but is given the name Aisa by both Barth (as "Aaisha") and Urvoy (as "Aicha").

== Modern hypotheses ==
The process of state formation in Kanem, the original core territory of the Kanem–Bornu Empire, is largely unknown. The state is generally believed to have been founded c. 700 by the Zaghawa people, pastoralists from the Ennedi Plateau in the northeast, but to quickly have grown to encompass several other ethnic groups, such as the Toubou people, with different groups eventually giving rise to the Kanembu people. Njimi is generally identified as the original capital of the empire. Another site, Manan, has also been proposed to have been the pre-Islamic capital. In 1989, the Cameroonian historian Verkijika Fanso treated Susam as a historical figure and the founder of Kanem, who may have originated as a nomadic leader and united various groups into the Kanembu people.

The German historian Dierk Lange has suggested that Kanem's establishment was connected to refugees from the fall of the Neo-Assyrian Empire in the 7th century BCE. As part of his hypothesis, Lange identified the legendary Duguwa rulers of Kanem as cultural memories of various historical figures from different civilizations in the Ancient Near East. Lange connected the girgam's title "king of the world in his time in its four directions" to the ancient Mesopotamian title "king of the four corners of the world", and the name Sayf to the Sumerian royal title sipa ("shepherd"). Lange specifically identified Susam with Sargon of Akkad, the "most important" of the rulers referred to as sipa. Lange's hypothesis on the origin of Kanem has been criticised for lack of evidence and has found no acceptance among other researchers.
