= Dorugu =

African traveller and writer

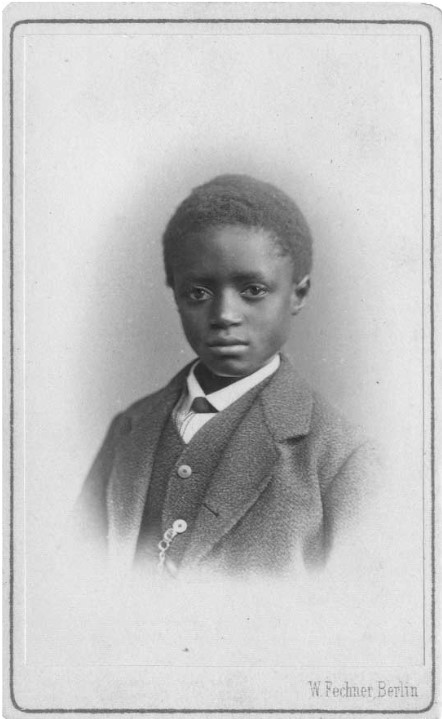
- Presumed portrait of Dorugu. Wilhelm Fechner's studio, Berlin, 1856.
- Born: around 1840; Dambanas (in present-day Kantche, Niger)
- Died: November 29, 1912; Nasarawa, Kano Province, Northern Nigeria Protectorate
- Occupation: Enslaved. Eplorer. Writer. Interpreter
- Notable work: Magana Hausa

Dorugu, Dyrregu or James Henry Dorugu, (c.1840 - 29 November 1912) was a Hausa man who travelled in Africa and Europe, and was one of the authors of the first Hausa book published in Europe.

Dorugu became a slave after being captured during a slave raid by the sultanate of Damagaram, and as a young boy was taken into the service of the European explorers Adolf Overweg and Heinrich Barth. He accompanied Barth during his exploration of West Africa and the Sahel.

Dorugu, along with another African companion, Abbega, returned with Barth to Europe in 1855. During his stay in Europe, Dorugu converted to Christianity. He worked alongside James Frederick Schön, who was carrying out research on Hausa language and culture, and contributed to the writing of Magana Hausa, which includes Dorugu's autobiography. Magana Hausa is the first printed text in the Hausa language and is an important linguistic and sociological source.

Dorugu returned to Africa in 1864 and became an interpreter in Kano and then in Nassarawa, in present-day northern Nigeria. He worked as an intermediary between Europeans and African leaders until his death in 1912.

== Biography ==
=== Childhood in Slavery ===
Dorugu was born around 1839 or 1840 in the village of Dambanas in the region of Kantché in present-day Niger to a poor, farming family. He had one brother and one sister. His father grew wheat and cotton and played the drums.

The family moved around to avoid capture by jihadi slave raids. Just after the death of his older sister at the end of the 1840s, his mother was captured and enslaved while bringing a meal to her husband who was farming in the fields. She was captured by warriors from the Kanem-Bornu region. Dorugu and his father were captured by troops belonging to the sultan of Damaragam.

The region of Kantché, where Dorugu's birth village of Dambanas is located, was caught in the middle of a geopolitical tug-of-war during the mid 1800s. At the time of Durugu's early childhood, the region was trying to retain its independence in the face of increased pressure to cede control from two neighbouring sultanates, Kanem-Bornu and Damagaram. The Kantché authorities ultimately decided to abandon the village of Dambanas to the sultanate of Damaragam. A short time after, the entire region of Kantché was forced to give itself up to the sultanate of Damagaram.

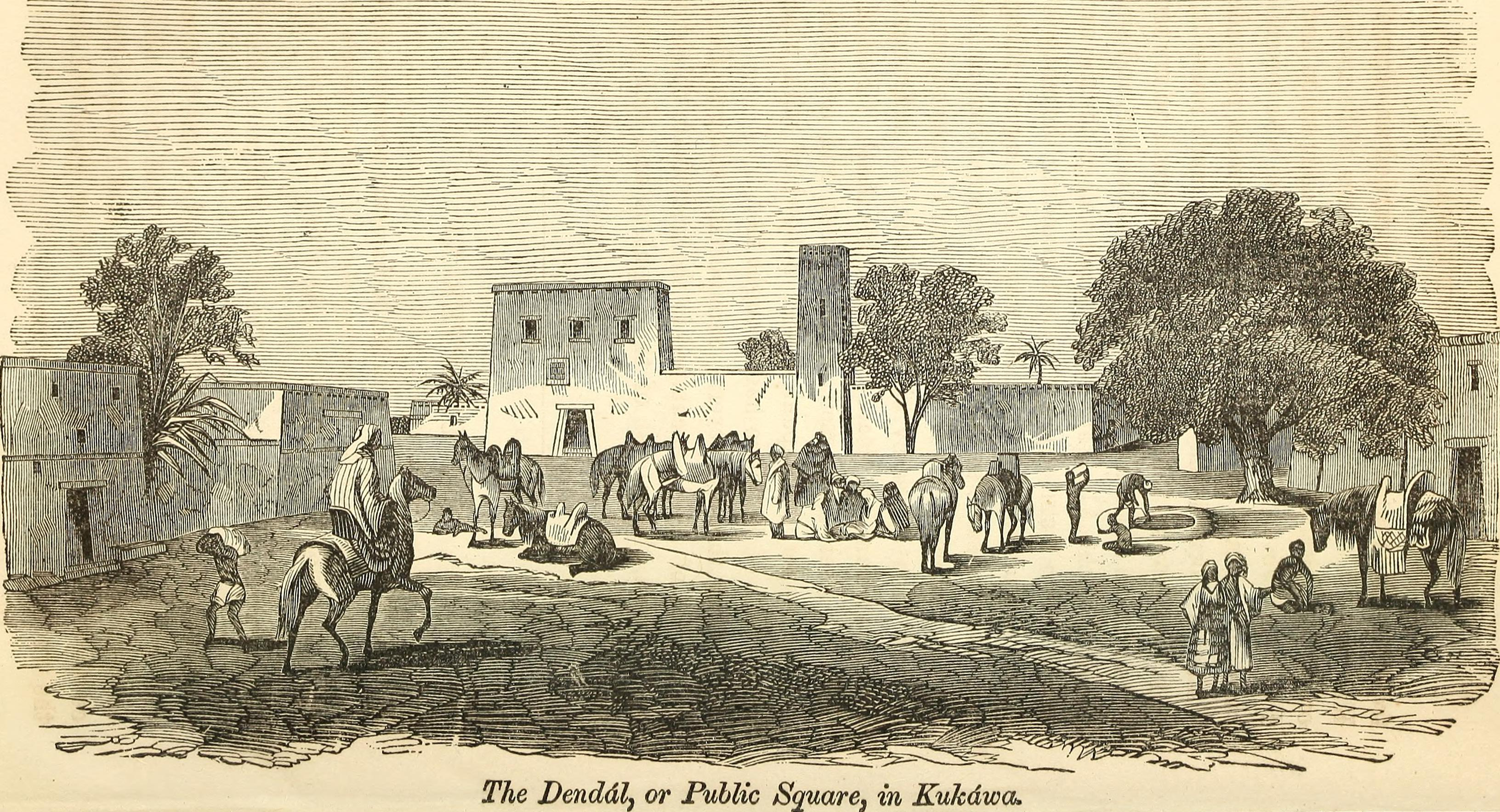
The public square in Kukawa in the mid-19th century.

Torn away from his family, Dorugu was then taken to the city of Zinder, the capital of the sultanate of Damaragam, where he was locked up and enslaved. Dorugu's case was far from exceptional: during this period, a huge number of slaves were engaged in trade and agriculture across the Sahel region. Dorugu's master gave him the name of Barka Gan. He was later sold to a North African Arab trader in Kukawa, in present-day Nigeria. With this new master, Dorugu enjoyed a relative freedom of movement due to the fact that the city was enclosed by an outer wall watched over by guards. However, his masters still feared he might run away, and so put Dorugu back into chains and sold him on.

=== Travels with European explorers ===
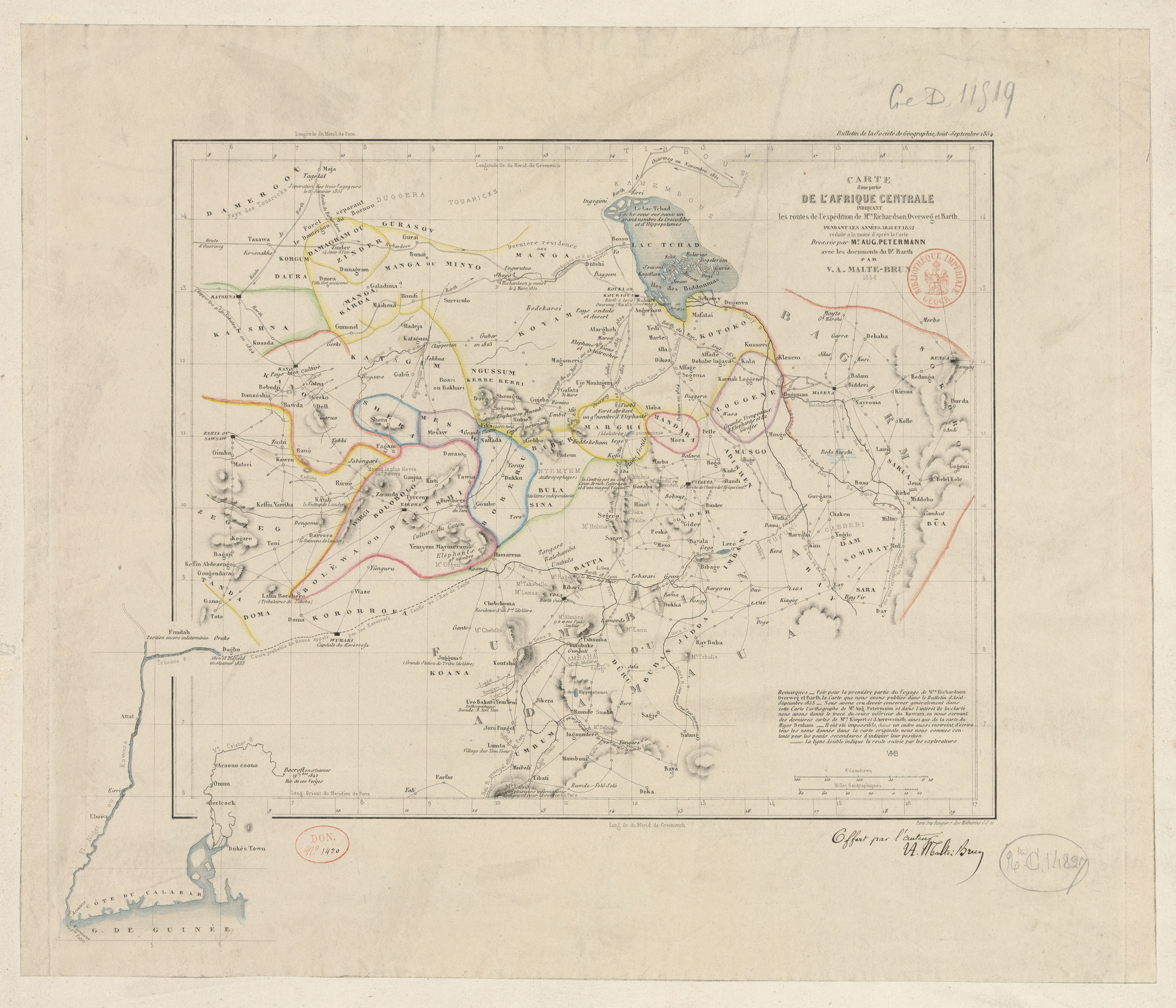
Map of the journeys made by Richardson, Overweg et Barth in 1851-1852, Paris, 1854. BNF. The map features the towns of Zinder et Kukawa (written Koukaoua).

Thus, by around the age of 12, Dorugu found himself in Kukawa, the capital of Kanem-Bornu. In 1851, his services were rented out by his master at the time to the German explorer Adolf Overweg, who charged him with looking after the camels. Alongside James Richardson and Heinrich Barth, Overweg was one of three European explorers who directed the African Mission, whose manpower was composed of around 60 armed men recruited in Libya. Dorugu would later tell of how, never having seen a white person before, he was initially afraid that Overweg might eat him. This contrasts with a stereotype of African people widely held by Europeans at this time, which imagined them to practice cannibalism.

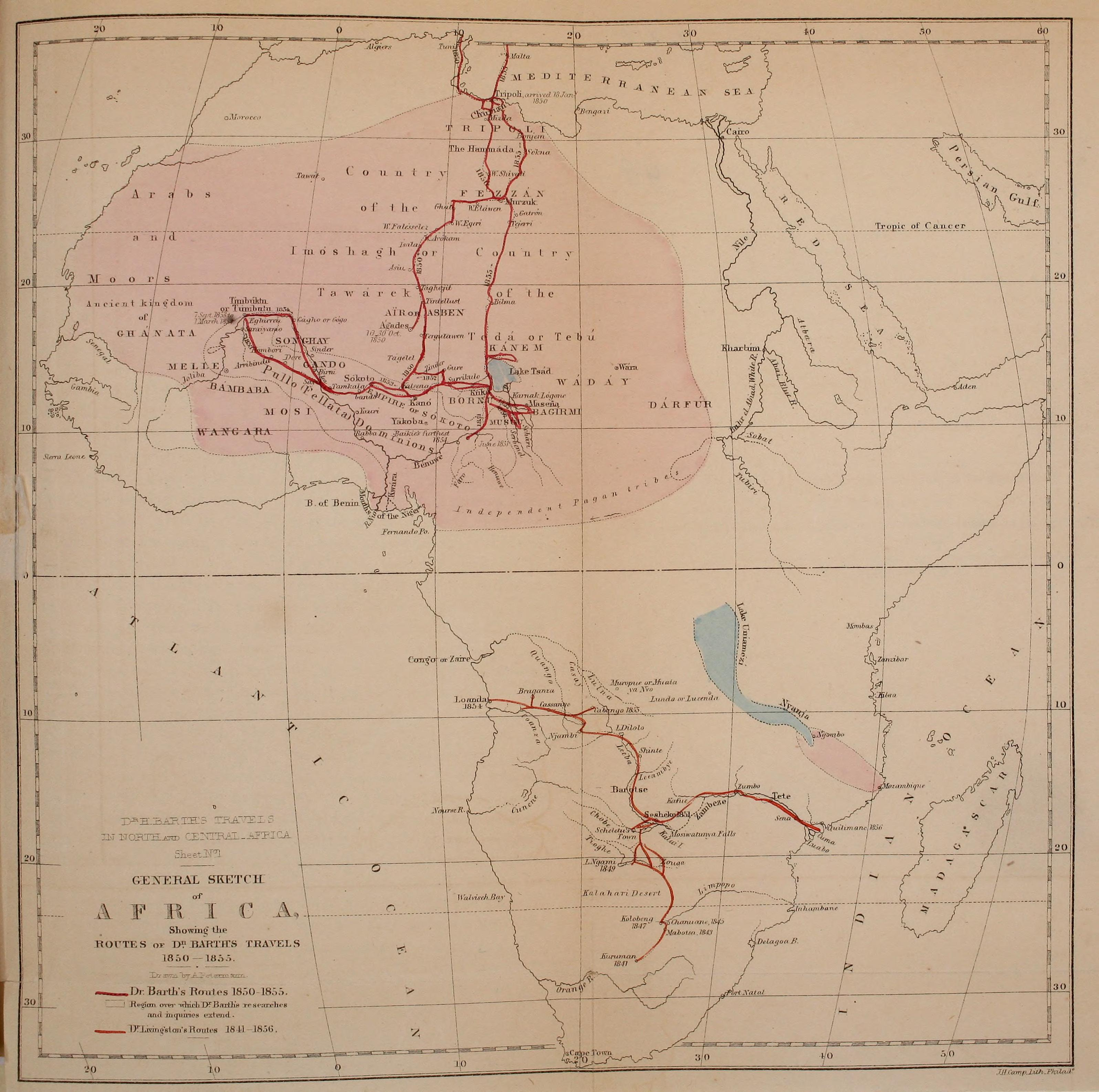
Barth's itinerary.

Overweg bought Dorugu from his master and subsequently emancipated him, keeping him as a free servant, and giving him a new name, Adam. When Overweg died in October 1852, Heinrich Barth took Dorugu, and another servant of Overweg named Abbega, into his service. Barth hoped to learn the Hausa language from them. Dorugu and Abbega travelled for three years with Barth in Africa before accompanying him to Europe in 1855. Dorugu's freedom from slavery must be relativised: as a young boy without any family connections, having lost contact with his father, he would have scarcely have had any other choice than to stay in Barth's service, and accept him as his master.

With Barth, Dorugu travelled through Kanem-Bornu, around Lake Chad, to Timbuktu and crossed the Sahara. Barth, Abbega and Dorugu then crossed the Mediterranean Sea from Tripoli to Marseille, stopping briefly in Malta. They then boarded a train bound for London via Paris, arriving in September 1855. In Tripoli, Heinrich Barth bought Ottoman style clothing for his two servants, an episode which Dorugu described in his autobiography, saying that he expressed his gratitude to Barth for having done so. Dorugu also indicates that he was impressed by his first experiences seeing the sea, and travelling on boats and trains.

=== An African traveller in Europe ===
In his autobiography, Dorugu describes his experience of British society. He comments especially on the length of dinner times and the table manners expected amongst the middle and upper classes.

As a young African man in Europe, Dorugu witnessed and learnt European customs as he fulfilled various roles for his hosts. In October 1855, Dorugu accompanied Barth and his family to Hamburg where, despite not being a domestic servant, was treated as such. The relationship between Dorugu and Heinrich Barth is clearly unequal. After this, they travelled around various towns in Germany. Barth presented Dorugu to high society, notably to the King of Prussia and to the future Emperor Guillaume I.

In Berlin, Barth commissioned a portrait of Abbega and Dorugu, dressed according to prevailing European perceptions of traditional African clothing. The two are referred to by their African names, A'bbega and Dyrregu, in the title of the portrait. In Berlin in 1856, the Silesian photographer and painter Wilhelm Fechner produced a photographic portrait supposedly of Dorugu, dressed in a three piece suit and portrayed more as a young man than as a child. However, the Hausa language specialist Paul Newman has expressed doubt about the identification of the person in the image as Dorugu, because of the apparent young age of the subject. In Europe, Abbega and Dorugu received unwanted, perverse attention, often being stared at in public or followed by groups of children who they have to chase away.

In November 1855, Barth moved to London and brought Abbega and Dorugu with him. There, Barth was accused by the Anti-Slavery Society of treating the two men as slaves and of having engaged in the slave trade during his time in Africa. Despite his consistent denial of these accusations, they harmed his reputation. In 1856, Abbega and Dorugu asked Barth to return them home to Africa because they were suffering from homesickness. However, they ultimately decided to stay in England after becoming acquainted with James Frederick Schön, a former explorer and missionary in Africa, who returned to Europe in 1847, and an avid linguist of the Hausa language. Schön wanted to take advantage of Dorugu's linguistic knowledge, despite strong opposition from Barth.

Dorugu remained in Europe for 8 years, and during this time learned to read and write in English. In 1857, Abbega and Dorugu, who were previously Muslims, were baptised Christian: on this occasion, Abbega took as his baptismal name that of the anti-slavery campaigner Frederick Buxton, with whom he had been residing, and so became Frederick Buxton Abbega. As for Dorugu, he took on the first names of Schön and Barth, becoming James Henry Dorugu. The same year, Abbega returned to Africa with a group of missionaries, and subsequently became the chief of the village of Lokoja, in present-day Nigeria.

In 1868, Thomas Frederick Ball published in his book Anecdotes of aborigines a drawing representing Abbega and Dorugu in European clothing. The arrangement of the two men in the drawing is reminiscent of previous portraits of them in Ottoman and African clothing, revealing the drawing's inspiration. However, unlike the other portraits, only their European names are indicated in the title of the drawing, and they are represented as young students at work.

=== Autobiography and Hausa literature ===
The seven-year partnership between Dorugu and Schön produced four books relating to the Hausa language: a translation of the Bible, a grammar guide, a dictionary, and an anthology of stories. The latter contained within it Dorugu's autobiography, which was dictated by Dorugu to Schön. Dorugu was not paid for his contributions to the publication of these works.

Dorugu's autobiography is about a hundred pages long, and featured in Schön's 1885 publication of Hausa stories, Magana Hausa. The volume also contained 52 tales dictated by Dorugu, who impressed Schön with his vast knowledge of stories despite his young age.

This collection of stories is one of the oldest known written traces of Hausa oral tradition, of which the publication came about thanks to the meeting of geographic and linguistic curiosity. It is the first printed Hausa text, and the first which explains oral literary practice in Hausa. The Hausa spoken by Dorugu reveals an influence of dialectical forms native to the town of Zinder called Damagaranci. Despite Schön's genuine interest for the Hausa language, his introduction to Dorugu's stories is revealing of his colonial and eurocentric prejudices. Dorugu also sometimes complained about Schön's unrelenting curiosity for his stories.

For Schön as for Barth, it seems Dorugu mostly stays an object of linguistic and cultural curiosity, and remains a servant and non-paid contributor to their work.

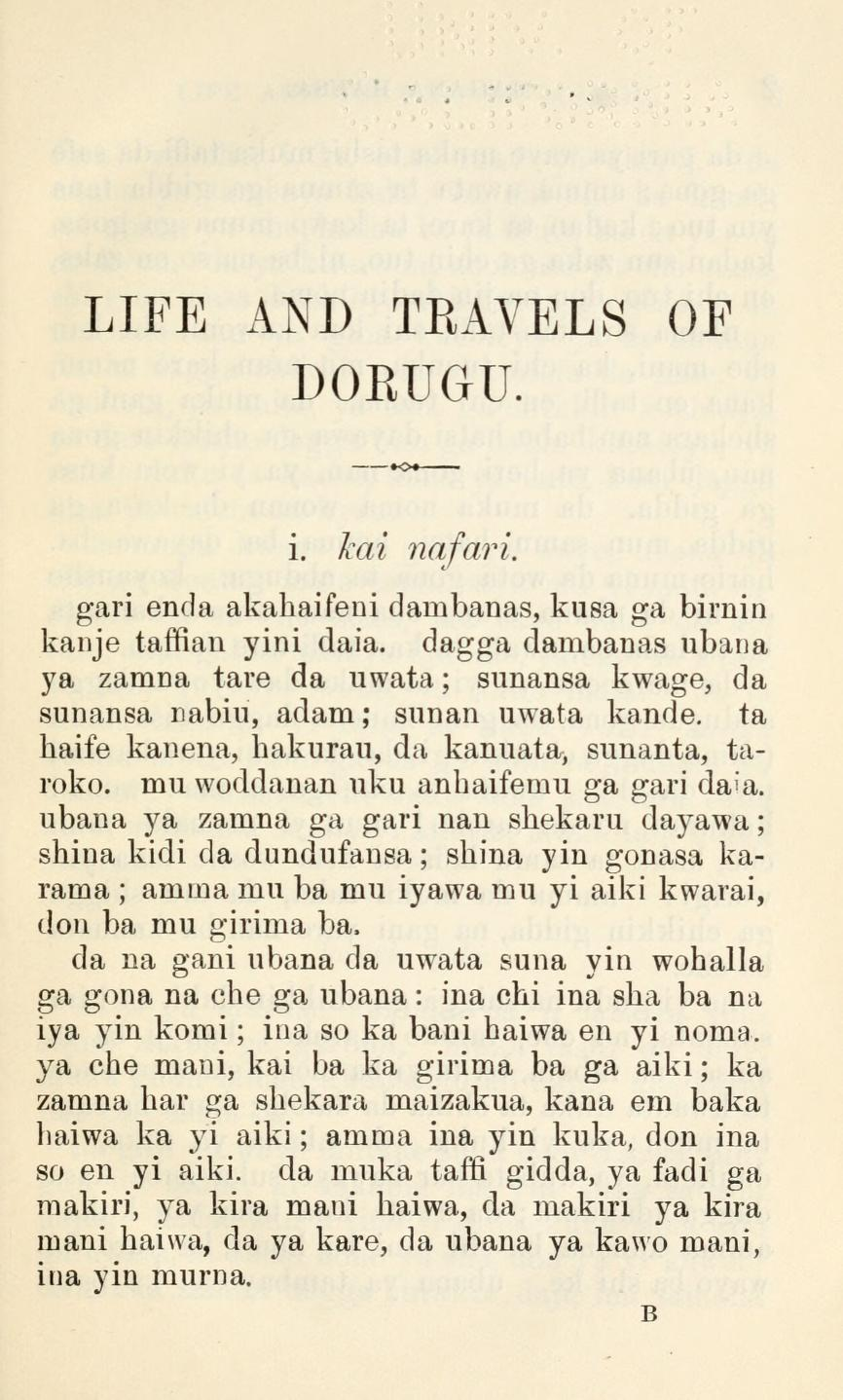
First page of Dorugu's autobiography in Hausa.

Dorugu's life is known to us primarily through his autobiography, in which he describes his life in slavery, the travels he undertook alongside Barth, and his time in Europe. The text is largely descriptive and does not centre Dorugu or his thoughts and feelings about his experiences, even if he does at certain points note his surprise at seeing the snow in Germany, or shock regarding the slightness of English women's build, for example.

Comparison with Barth's writings reveals the precision of Dorugu's memory regarding their time together. However, while Barth only mentions Dorugu and Abbega twice in his account, Dorugu's is centered on Barth and Abbega. Additionally, Dorugu's autobiography describes his life in Africa in a largely negative light, evoking war, violence and slavery, in contrast to a much more positive account of his experiences in Europe. It seems clear that Schön's values and emphasis on European supremacy affected the way in which the autobiography is written; yet it is now impossible to identify the specific ways in which Schön's interpretation of the narrative modified Dorugu's own, spoken account of his life.

In 1971, the Hausa language specialist Paul Newman produced an annotated English language version of Dorugu's autobiography, which brought it back into the spotlight. It was published in West African travels and adventures: two autobiographical narratives from Northern Nigeria, which also contained the autobiography of Abbega's grandson Mai-Mana. Newman emphasised the sociological and historical importance of Dorugu's life story, in addition to its linguistic significance. Academic interest in Newman's publication is revealed by the large amount of articles written in response to it by scholars, initiating a conversation around African perspectives of European scientific exploration of the Sahel in the 19th century.

=== Return to Africa ===
Dorugu returned to Africa in 1864 and joined Abbega in Lokoja. He subsequently settled in the Kano region of present-day Nigeria, and then in Nasarawa where he worked as an Hausa interpreter for European missionaries, explorers and colonial administrators. In 1865, he was employed by the German explorer Gerhard Rohlfs, who lauded Dorugu's competence because of his training by Schön. Dorugu sometimes avoided translating the entirety of Rohlf's words when he was speaking out of annoyance with an African ruler: "Dorugu feared the despot's wrath and so did not interpret to him either my reproachful speech or the announcement of my imminent departure".

Towards the end of his life, Dorugu lived in Nassarawa in the Kano Province where he taught the Roman alphabet at a school and received payment by the local government. Isabelle Vischer, a Swiss woman whose husband, Hanns, worked for the British administration in Northern Nigeria, described her encounter with Dorugu in her book Croquis et souvenirs de la Nigérie du Nord [Sketches and Memories of Northern Nigeria], describing him as very thin and always wearing glasses on his forehead, rather than on his nose, giving the impression that he didn't really need them. The scholar Julia Wincker considers this practice a way of portraying himself as erudite. Dorugu's wife looked after him up until his death in 1912, which is described by Vischer:

"29th November 1912. The old 'Dorugu' died in Nassarawa [sic] this morning. We have lost a most original person, and his past was anything but ordinary. It is fortunate that the old man was able to die now, because a form of leprosy had just been discovered on him, which would have condemned him to isolation; something that would have caused him great sorrow. Very elderly, he passed away peacefully. He will be buried in the Christian cemetery in Nassarawa."

Following his death, Dorugu's family discovered that he had kept a secret collection of European objects: glasses, biscuit tins, clothing embroidered with the name of European explorers who he had worked for, as well as £250 sterling, in little rolls of gold and silver pieces. Uncertainty surrounding the religion of Dorugu's widow complicated matters in the Native Court regarding the management of his estate, which was "quite a fortune in the eyes of his compatriots." If, like her deceased husband, she was Christian, the entire estate would be transferred to her; otherwise she would only receive a small portion of it. Once the alkali (Islamic judge) was satisfied that she understood this, she was asked to state her religion. According to Vischer:

The alkali therefore explained the matter to her. In the face of such strong temptation, would it not have been easy for the poor woman to have answered without too strict a regard for the truth so as to inherit all of Dorugu's wealth? She did not even hesitate. Not only did she declare that she was a Moslem, but she even distributed as alms the little that she did inherit. She will continue her humble existence in obscurity.

As other African people did at this time, Dorugu used the linguistic, cultural and institutional knowledge he gained during his young life in the Sahel to gain in status under British colonial rule of the region. Throughout his life, he demonstrated a remarkable adaptability to a variety of contexts, in which he was often not treated as an equal by his European contemporaries, and played an important mediating role between the two worlds he inhabited, African and European.

== See also ==
=== Bibliography ===
==== Dorugu's autobiography ====
- Hausa : (ha) Dorugu, « The Life and Travels of Dorugu, as Dictated by Himself », in James Frederick Schön, Magána Hausa : Native Literature, or Proverbs, Tales, Fables and Historical Fragments in the Hausa Language, to Which Is Added a Translation in English, Londres, Society for Promoting Christian Knowledge, 1885 (reprinted. 1906), 2nd édition., 256 p., p. 1-82.
- Translation into English : Paul Newman, « The Life and Travels of Dorugu », in A. H. M. Kirk-Greene et Paul Newman (ed.), West African travels and adventures: two autobiographical narratives from Northern Nigeria, New Haven-London, Yale University Press, 1971, 276 p. (ISBN 978-0-300-01426-6), p. 27-130.

==== Other historical sources ====
- Barth, Heinrich (1859), Travels and discoveries in North and Central Africa. From the journal of an expedition undertaken under the auspices of H.B.M.’s government in the years 1849-1855. Philadelphia: J.W. Bradley, p. 558
- Schön, James Frederick (1862). Grammar of the Hausa Language. London: Church Missionary House. p. 270.
- Thomas Frederick Ball (1868). Anecdotes of aborigines or Illustrations of the coloured races being men and brethren. London: Partridge & Co.
- Rohlfs, Gerhard (1874). Quer durch Afrika : Reise vom Mittelmeer nach dem Tschad-See und zum Golf von Guinea (in German). Leipzig: Brockhaus. p. 692.
- Vischer, Isabelle (1915). Croquis et souvenirs de la Nigérie du Nord. Paris-Neuchâtel: Attinger frères. p. 139.

==== Twenty-first Century Historiography ====
- Aliyu, Sani Abba (2000). "Christian Missionaries and Hausa Literature in Nigeria, 1840–1890: A Critical Evaluation" (PDF). Kano Studies. nouvelle série. 1: 93–118.
- Kennedy, Dane (2013). The Last Blank Spaces. Cambridge (Mass.) - Londres: Harvard University Press. p. 365. ISBN 978-0-674-04847-8. JSTOR j.ctvjk2xcf.
- Kramer, Fritz W. (2011). "Als Fremd erfahren werden: Eine Lektüre der Reisebeschreibungen von Dorugu und Ham Mukasa". Paideuma (in German). 57: 37–52. ISSN 0078-7809. JSTOR 23644426.
- Lefebvre, Camille (2012). "Un esclave a vu le monde: Se déplacer en tant qu'esclave au Soudan central (19th century)". Locus: Revista de História. 18 (2): 105–143. ISSN 2594-8296.
- Lefebvre, Camille (2015). Frontières de sable, frontières de papier. Bibliothèque historique des pays d'islam (in French). Paris: Publications de la Sorbonne. doi:10.4000/books.psorbonne.36501. ISBN 978-2-85944-883-7.
- Camille Lefebvre, « 1856 Dorugu, un voyageur haoussa en Europe », dans Romain Bertrand (dir.), L'exploration du monde : Une autre histoire des Grandes Découvertes, Paris, Éditions du Seuil, coll. « Points » (no H617), 2023, 2e éd. (1re éd. 2019), 536 p. (ISBN 978-2-7578-9776-8, lire en ligne), p. 405-409.
- Marx, Christoph (2021). Von Berlin nach Timbuktu (in German). Göttingen: Wallstein Verlag. p. 381. doi:10.5771/9783835347250. ISBN 978-3-8353-4725-0.
- Mohammed Bashir Salau (2021). "The Sahara and North Africa in the Nineteenth Century". African Economic History. 49 (1): 154–172.
- Winckler, Julia (2009-12-01). "Regards croisés: James Henry Dorugu's Nineteenth-Century European Travel Account". Journeys. 10 (2): 1–30. doi:10.3167/jys.2009.100201. ISSN 1465-2609.
- Zehnle, Stephanie (2020). A Geography of Jihad. Studien des Leibniz-Zentrum Moderner Orient. Berlin - Boston: De Gruyter. p. 718. doi:10.1515/9783110675276. ISBN 978-3-87997-727-7.
