= Selema of Kanem =

Selema of Kanem may refer to three different rulers of the Kanem–Bornu Empire:

- Selema I, 11th century
- Selema II, 12th–13th century
- Selema III, 14th century
