= Arki of Kanem =

Arki

Mai of the Kanem–Bornu Empire
- Reign: 10th/11th century (42–44 years)
- Predecessor: Bulu
- Successor: Hu
- Spouse: Teksuwa
- Issue: Hu
- Dynasty: Duguwa dynasty
- Father: Bulu
- Mother: Azasenaa

Arki, Arku, or Arkaman was the legendary ninth mai (ruler) of the Kanem–Bornu Empire, ruling in the 10th and/or 11th century. According to later tradition, Arki was the last pre-Islamic ruler of the empire.

== Sources ==
Information about Arki comes mainly from the girgam, the orally recited royal chronicle of the Kanem–Bornu Empire, which is mainly known through transcriptions and translations by European explorers, scholars, and colonial officials in various copies in the 19th and 20th centuries, most importantly by Heinrich Barth, Moïse Landeroin, and Gustav Nachtigal. Richmond Palmer later worked with the same material as Barth, with some additions, and Yves Urvoy also published a study in the 1940s attempting to reconcile various sources. Because the long timespan separating Arki from recorded history and the lack of contemporary evidence, Arki and the other mais of the Duguwa dynasty are generally treated as legendary figures of uncertain historicity.

Arki in 19th- and 20th-century European transcriptions of the girgam
Attribute	Barth (1857)	Nachtigal (1881)	Landeroin (1911)	Palmer (1936)
Name	A´rki	Harki or Arki	Ariki	Arkaman
Reign	44 years	43 years	44 years	—
Father	Bulú	Hajôma	Boulou	Bulu
Mother	Azisenna	—	—	Arsat

A reign of just over forty years is consistent across sources; Yves Urvoy assigns Arki 42 years, Cohen (1966) assigns him 44 years, and Dierk Lange and B. W. Barkindo (1992) also assigned him 44 years. By counting back in different versions of the king lists, Nachtigal speculatively dated Arki's reign to 962–1005, Landeroin to 1018–1062, Urvoy to 1035–1077, and Lange and Barkindo to 1023–1067. Various variations of Arki's name is used across sources. Cohen (1966) considers the standard variations to be Arki, Arku, and Arkaman.

== Life ==
Most versions of the girgam present Arki as the son of his direct predecessor, Bulu. Nachtigal's version instead makes Arki a son of the earlier mai Adyoma and thus Bulu's brother. Arki's mother is identified as Azisenna by Barth, Azasanna by Palmer (1928), Arsat by Palmer (1936), and Azasenaa by Cohen. Arki's mother is said to have been of Toubou origin, and hailed from the "Temagherí" or "Tumagari" tribe. One version of the girgam, translated by Palmer in 1912, states that Arki was "as white as silk", reflecting the fictional Arabising origin legends of later rulers of the empire, which claimed that they were of Arab ancestry rather than from a local group. It was common for later African Islamic ruling dynasties to invent fictional Arab descent as a source of prestige.

The girgam claims that Arki established several colonies of slaves in the lands north of Kanem, including in Toubou lands, settling 300 slaves at Dirka (probably Dirkou), another 300 at Siggedim (a site in the Kaouar), and another 300 in Zeila (Germa in Fezzan). The settlers may not have been exclusively slaves; many may also have belonged to the "Kanuri tribe of the Tura". The name Zeila is sometimes alternatively given as Rílana or Zílana, and is also stated to have been the site at which Arki died. It is difficult to verify whether this account is true. The establishment of the slave colonies may have been an effort to better monitor and control the trading and religious activities of the Berbers in the region.

Arki was succeeded as mai by his child Hu, who may have been a woman. Hu was the first Muslim ruler of the empire.
