= Dunama I Umemi =

Mai of the Kanem–Bornu Empire
- Reign: 11th/12th century (53–55 years) c. 1097–1151 (Note: King lists (girgams) and chronicles translated in the 19th–20th centuries assign Dunama a reign of 53 years (Palmer, Urvoy), 54 years (Nachtigal), or 55 years (Barth, Landeroin). Due to this and to differing dates and calculations for other mais, various dates have been given for his reign, including 1098–1150 (Barth), 1098–1151 (Palmer), 1097–1150 (Urvoy), 1093–1148 (Landeroin), and 1151–1205 (Nachtigal). Cohen (1966) considered a reign of 54 years most likely. Lange (1984) dated Dunama's reign to 1086–1140, Stewart (1989) dated it to 1097–1150, and Bosworth (2012) dated it to 1097–1151.)
- Predecessor: Hummay
- Successor: Biri I Uthman
- Died: c. 1151 al-Ḳulzum, Egypt (Fatimid Caliphate)
- Spouse: Fasama
- Issue: Biri I Uthman
- Dynasty: Sayfawa dynasty
- Father: Hummay
- Mother: Kinta

Dunama I (Note: Dunama is sometimes alternatively recorded as Muhammad.) (Dunama bin Hummay), called Dunama Umemi, (Note: "Dunama, son of Hummay". The name is also spelled Wumemi, Humemi, and Humainmi.) was mai (ruler) of the Kanem–Bornu Empire in the late 11th to mid-12th century, ruling approximately 1097–1151. Dunama was a powerful and influential ruler, and among the longest-reigning monarchs of the empire. He is credited with being the ruler under whom the empire first began to take control of the eastern trans-Saharan trade routes.

== Life ==
Dunama was a son of mai Hummay. His mother was named Kinta and was of Toubou origin. Dunama succeeded his father as mai in the late 11th century, after Hummay died in Egypt while on a pilgrimage to Mecca.

Dunama was a very powerful ruler. The girgam (orally transmitted royal chronicle) records that Dunama had a strong and vast army, of both horsemen and foot soldiers. One account claims that the army included 100,000 cavalry and 120,000 infantry, not counting mercenaries. This is clearly a fanciful exaggeration; cavalry is not believed to have been introduced in Kanem until the time of Dunama's great-great-grandson, Dunama II Dibalemi.

It was under Dunama that the empire first began to take control of eastern trans-Saharan trade routes, in particular the major route that passed by Lake Chad and up north through Bilma to Tripoli. Control of the trade increased Kanem's prosperity. Dunama himself actively engaged in trade, including of slaves. Dunama's participation in slave trade is recorded by the contemporary historian Al-Bakri, who noted that the mai had "unlimited authority over his subjects" and "enslaves from among them anyone he wants". Although Dunama was Muslim and could thus not enslave his Muslim subjects, the majority of the empire's populace remained non-Muslim in his time.

Dunama made the pilgrimage to Mecca twice, bringing a large retinue with him each time. On both trips, Dunama brought three hundred slaves to sell in Cairo. Dunama intended to make the pilgrimage a third time but provoked the suspicions of the Egyptian people while passing through the country. Egypt was at the time experiencing a turbulent political climate under the Fatimid Caliph al-Zafir. As Dunama was embarking on a ship from al-Ḳulzum (modern-day Suez), the Egyptians opened a sea-cock onboard his ship which caused it to sink. Dunama's followers reportedly witnessed him floating in the sea in his white pilgrimage garments until he disappeared from their sight. According to the girgam, the Egyptians had feared that Dunama planned to conquer their country, saying among themselves that "if this king returns from Mecca to this country, he will take from us our land and country without doubt."

Dunama had a long reign, ruling for 53–55 years. He was succeeded as mai by his son Biri I Uthman.
