= Fasama =

- Regent of the Kanem–Bornu Empire
- Spouse: Dunama I Umemi
- Issue: Biri I Uthman
- Dynasty: Sayfawa dynasty (by marriage)

Fasama (Note: The name is also spelled Fasamé.) was a consort (Note: The mai could have several wives. The senior wife bore the title gumsu but it is not clear if Fasama occupied that position. Later chroniclers mistakenly referred to Fasama as a gumsu in the reign of her son. This mistake might indicate that she was the gumsu of Dunama, which could have resulted in the confusion.) of Dunama I Umemi, a mai (ruler) of the Kanem–Bornu Empire in the late 11th to mid-12th century. After Dunama's death c. 1151, (Note: Various alternate dates have been suggested, see the articles of Dunama I Umemi and Biri I Uthman.) Fasama ruled the empire as regent for their son, Biri I Uthman. Fasama commanded great power as regent and appears to have had greater authority than her son, demonstrated by an incident when she had him imprisoned for a year after he meted out an unjust punishment.

== Life ==
Fasama originally hailed from the Kay (Koyam) tribe of Dirkou. In the late 11th century or early 12th century, Fasama became a consort of mai Dunama I Umemi, a mai (ruler) of the Kanem–Bornu Empire. Her marriage to mai Dunama may have served to re-strengthen the ties between the Kay and Kanem; the mother of Dunama's father Hummay had also been of Kay origin. Fasama was the mother of Dunama's heir, Biri I Uthman.

After Dunama's death c. 1151, Fasama took power in the empire as regent. Biri's reign lasted for over twenty years, until his death c. 1177, and it is unclear for how long Fasama held power. Biri may have been young at the beginning of his reign, necessitating the regency. Biri eventually had children of his own and the later Bornuan chronicler Ibn Furtu remembered Biri as a learned ruler, meaning that he was a capable and adult ruler for at least part of his reign. Fasama commanded great power as regent and her authority apparently eclipsed that of Biri himself. The girgam (the royal chronicle of the empire) records an incident when Biri had a thief executed, violating Islamic law. As punishment for this, Fasama had Biri imprisoned for an entire year.

Fasama was still an important figure in the empire in the childhood of Biri's sons. The girgam records that Biri's son Abdullah I Bikur and his brother Bitku visited Fasama in their youth. Fasama gifted Abdullah and Bitku a hundred camels each, indicating that she possessed great wealth. The camels gifted to Abdullah were apparently called Bikoru, perhaps the source of his name, and those given to Bitku were called Bitku.
