= Dunama III =

Mai of the Kanem–Bornu Empire
- Reign: 14th century (7–8 years?) c. 1369–1376 (Note: Specific regnal years of rulers of the Kanem–Bornu Empire are calculated by backdating from known events using their regnal lengths and vary between sources. Landeroin dated Idris and Dunama's reigns to 1339–1346 and 1324–1325, respectively. Nachtigal dated Dunama's reign to 1370–1377 and did not provide dates for Idris. Urvoy dated their potential co-reign to 1372–1380. Cohen (1966) considered an eight-year reign for both or either monarch the most likely. Bosworth (2012) dates them to c. 1369–1376.)
- Predecessor: Abubakar Liyatu
- Successor: Umar I Idrismi
- Co-ruler: Idris II Saradima (?)
- Died: c. 1376
- Dynasty: Sayfawa dynasty (Dawudid (Note: The 14th and 15th centuries saw protracted civil wars between the rival Idrisid (descendants of Idris I Nikalemi) and Dawudid (descendants of Dawud Nikalemi) branches of the Sayfawa dynasty.))
- Father: Ibrahim

Dunama III (Dunama bin Ibrāhīm) may have been a mai (ruler) of the Kanem–Bornu Empire in the 14th century, approximately 1369–1376, possibly co-ruling with mai Idris II Saradima.

== Sources and interpretation ==
The mais Idris II Saradima and Dunama III are recorded in lists of Kanem–Bornu rulers (girgams) translated by Gustav Nachtigal (1881) and Moïse Landeroin (1911). Both figures are omitted in lists translated by Heinrich Barth (1851) and Richmond Palmer (1936). Nachtigal left Idris's regnal years as "?" and assigned a seven-year reign to Dunama, whereas Landeroin assigned seven years to Idris and one year to Dunama. Idris and Dunama's reigns would fall between those of mais Abubakar Liyatu and Umar I Idrismi.

Later authors have varied in their approach. Urvoy (1941) listed Idris and Dunama as possible co-rulers, with a joint eight-year reign. Cohen (1966) stated that their absence in Barth and Palmer's lists suggest that Dunama and Idris were only vaguely remembered by the 19th century, and considered it possible that they were the same person, that one of them reigned briefly during the reign of the other, or that neither actually reigned. Lange (1984) and Stewart (1989) omit both Idris and Dunama from their lists of rulers. In his list of Kanem–Bornu rulers, Bosworth (2012) includes Idris "and/or" Dunama.

Both Nachtigal and Landeroin name Dunama III's father as Ibrahim. Nachtigal further specified that this Ibrahim was a son of mai Dawud Nikalemi.
