= Umar I Idrismi =

Mai of the Kanem–Bornu Empire
- Reign: 14th century (4–11 years) c. 1376–1387 (Note: King lists (girgams) and chronicles translated in the 19th–20th centuries assign Umar a reign of 4 years (Palmer), 5 years (Barth), or 7 years (Urvoy, Landeroin, Nachtigal). Cohen (1966) considered a reign of 5 years to be most likely. As a result of this, and due to different calculations for other mais, various dates have been given for his reign, including 1394–1398 (Barth), 1386/1387–1390/1391 (Palmer), 1380–1387 (Urvoy), 1399–1406 (Landeroin), and 1428–1435 (Nachtigal). Lange (1984) dated Umar's reign to 1382–1387 and Stewart (1989) dated it to 1394–1398. Bosworth (2012) assigned Umar a longer reign of 11 years, dated to 1376–1387.)
- Predecessor: Idris II Saradima and Dunama III
- Successor: Saʽid
- Died: c. 1387 "Demaghíya"
- Issue: Dunama IV; Abdullah III Dakumuni
- Dynasty: Sayfawa dynasty (Idrisid (Note: The 14th and 15th centuries saw protracted civil wars between the rival Idrisid (descendants of Idris I Nikalemi) and Dawudid (descendants of Dawud Nikalemi) branches of the Sayfawa dynasty.))
- Father: Idris I Nikalemi

Umar I (ʿUmar bin Idrīs), called Umar Idrismi, was mai (ruler) of the Kanem–Bornu Empire in the mid-to-late 14th century, ruling approximately 1376–1387. Umar's reign saw the loss of the imperial heartland of Kanem and its capital, Njimi, to the Bilala. Umar re-centered the empire in the Bornu region, located west of Lake Chad, which remained the new heartland of the empire for the rest of its existence.

== Life ==
Umar was a son of mai Idris I Nikalemi. Umar became mai in he mid-to-late 14th century, succeeding the possibly co-reigning mais Idris II Saradima and Dunama III.

By Umar's time, internal struggles and external attacks had torn Kanem apart. Since the death of mai Abdullah II Kademi in 1322, ten mais had reigned in a period of just over fifty years. Most of these mais had been killed in conflict with the empire's enemies, first in wars against the Sao south of Lake Chad and then in wars against the Bilala, who were invading the empire from the east. This proliferation of mais resulted in numerous claimants to the throne and led to a series of internecine civil wars, mostly between the Idrisid and Dawudid branches of the ruling Sayfawa dynasty.

In c. 1380, the Bilala captured Njimi, the imperial capital, and drove Umar and the other Sayfawa from Kanem. Faced with the catastrophe, Umar is said to have called an assembly of nobles who told him to "leave this place, our day here is done". Umar relocated across Lake Chad to the western region of Bornu, a former tributary territory. The initial new site of the court was the town of Kagha, a notorious refuge for claimants in imperial civil wars, where one went to regain their strength. The empire would lack a formal capital for some time, with the court of the mai constantly moving from one site to another. Bornu would remain the new heartland of the empire for the rest of its existence.

Umar ruled for between four and eleven years. The site of his death is recorded as Demaghíya (or variations thereof, such as Damagia). Umar was succeeded as mai by his brother Saʽid.
