= Biri I Uthman =

Mai of the Kanem–Bornu Empire
- Reign: 12th century (26–27 years) c. 1151–1177 (Note: King lists (girgams) and chronicles translated in the 19th–20th centuries assign Biri a reign of either 26 years (Palmer, Urvoy) or 27 years (Barth, Nachtigal, Landeroin). Due to this and to differing dates and calculations for other mais, various dates have been given for his reign, including 1151–1176 (Barth), 1151–1177 (Palmer), 1150–1176 (Urvoy), 1148–1175 (Landeroin), and 1205–1232 (Nachtigal). Cohen (1966) considered a reign of 27 years most likely. Lange (1984) dated Biri's reign to 1140–1166 and Stewart (1989) dated it to 1150–1176. Bosworth (2012) assigned a shorter reign to Biri than other authors, dating his reign to 1151–1174 (23 years).)
- Predecessor: Dunama I Umemi
- Successor: Abdullah I Bikur
- Regent: Fasama
- Died: c. 1177 "Ghamtilú"
- Spouse: Zainab
- Issue: Abdullah I Bikur; Bitku
- Dynasty: Sayfawa dynasty
- Father: Dunama I Umemi
- Mother: Fasama

Biri I (Biri bin Dunama), also recorded as Uthman Biri (ʿUthmān Biri bin Dunama), (Note: Bosworth (2012) uses Uthman Biri; most sources record him as just Biri. He is also incorrectly recorded as Dala (a name used in some sources for several mais named Abdullah).) was mai (ruler) of the Kanem–Bornu Empire in the mid-to-late 12th century, ruling approximately 1151–1177.

== Life ==
Biri was a son of mai Dunama I Umemi. His mother was named Fasama and hailed from the Kay (Koyam) tribe of Dirkou. Biri succeeded his father as mai after Dunama was killed on a pilgrimage while in Egypt. Biri was, at least in his early reign, completely under the influence of his mother Fasama, who governed the empire as regent. As regent, Fasama's power apparently eclipsed Biri's own; the girgam (the royal chronicle of the empire) records an incident when Biri had a thief executed, violating Islamic law. As punishment for this, Fasama had Biri imprisoned for an entire year.

Biri eventually came into his own as a ruler and was remembered in later tradition as a very learned ruler, though "weak in his conduct of the government". Biri ruled for 26–27 years. The site of his death is recorded as Ghamtilú, or variations thereof (Ghamtilú Bela Ghanna, Gamtilo Jilarge, "Jilargen in the land of Gamtilo"). Biri was succeeded as mai by his son Abdullah I Bikur.
