= Hummay =

Mai of the Kanem–Bornu Empire
- Reign: 11th century (12–23 years) c. 1085–1097 (Note: King lists (girgams) and chronicles translated in the 19th–20th centuries assign Dunama a reign of either 12 years (Barth, Palmer, Urvoy), 22 years (Nachtigal), or 23 years (Landeroin). Due to this and to differing dates and calculations for other mais, various dates have been given for his reign, including 1086–1097 (Barth), 1085–1097 (Palmer), 1085–1097 (Urvoy), 1070–1093 (Landeroin), and 1129–1151 (Nachtigal). Cohen (1966) considered a reign of 12 years most likely. Lange (1984) dated Hummay's reign to 1075–1086, whereas both Stewart (1989) and Bosworth (2012) used Palmer's dates, 1085–1097. Hiribarren (2016) assigned Hummay a shorter reign of just five years, 1075–1080.)
- Predecessor: Selema I
- Successor: Dunama I Umemi
- Died: c. 1097; Egypt (Fatimid Caliphate)
- Spouse: Kinta
- Issue: Dunama I Umemi
- Dynasty: Sayfawa dynasty
- Father: Selema I (?)
- Mother: Tigiram (Note: Barth (1857) recorded Hummay's mother as Tikramma, Palmer (1926) records her as Teigaramt, and Palmer (1936) calls her Tigiram. Cohen considered Tigiram to be the likely correct version.)

Hummay (Note: The spelling of Hummay's name varies between sources. Variations include Wume, Hume, Humé, Ume, Umé, Umme, Oumé, Urne, and Humai. He may be counted as Hummay I if the later mai Amarma is counted as Hummay II.) was mai (ruler) of the Kanem–Bornu Empire in the late 11th century, ruling approximately 1085–1097. Later tradition records Hummay as the founder of the Sayfawa dynasty, which went on to rule the empire for over seven centuries. Hummay is sometimes erroneously referred to as the first Muslim ruler of the empire, a distinction that belongs to the earlier mai Hu. The nature of Hummay's rise to the throne and the fall of the preceding Duguwa dynasty is unclear since most sources identify the last Duguwa mai, Selema I, as Hummay's father.

== Origin and rise to the throne ==
Hummay's rise to the throne of Kanem in the late 11th century is by later sources considered to have marked the rise of a new royal dynasty, the Sayfawa dynasty. Earlier mais are said to have belonged to the empire's original dynasty, the Duguwa dynasty. The nature of Hummay's rise to the throne and what is meant by the dynastic shift is unclear. Most versions of the girgam (the empire's royal chronicle) records Hummay as the son of his direct predecessor, Selema I (who is also called Abd al-Jalil). (Note: Out of the lists translated in the 19th–20th centuries, Barth, Palmer, Urvoy, and Landeroin all identify Hummay's predecessor Selema (Abd al-Jalil) as Hummay's father. Landeroin is the only to disagree, and instead names Hummay's father as Biri.) Hummay is called "ibn Abd al-Jalil" or "ibn Selema" in several sources, and sometimes given the epithet Jilmi ("son of Jil", i.e. Abd al-Jalil). Hummay's mother was named Tigiram and hailed from the Kay (Koyam) tribe of Dirkou.

The passage in the girgam about Selema ends with "That is what we have written about the history of the Banū Dūkū; (Note: "Descendants of Duku", i.e. the Duguwa dynasty) we shall now proceed to set down the history of the Banū Ḥummay, (Note: "Descendants of Hummay", i.e. the Sayfawa dynasty) who professed Islam". The difference between the Duguwa and Sayfawa mais has thus often been interpreted, for instance by Barth in 1857, as merely religious, with both technically being the same royal lineage. Hummay is thus sometimes erroneously identified as the empire's first Muslim ruler; this interpretation is demonstrably incorrect since both Selema and Selema's predecessor Hu were Muslims.

The dynastic shift may be a reference to Selema being overthrown by Hummay, who could have been falsely linked to the former dynasty as Selema's supposed son in the royal chronicle. The reason for Selema's overthrow in this case is unknown. Hummay might have been an adherent of Sunni Islam whereas Selema and Hu were Ibadi Muslims. Hiribarren (2016) suggested that Hummay seized power with the help of a pro-Islam faction at court. Kanem is generally believed to have been founded by the Zaghawa people, who are associated with the kingdom in Arab sources from the 9th to the 11th century. In the 12th century, the Zaghawa are attested as a separate entity from Kanem, living as nomads in the northeast. Hummay's rise to power could thus be linked to a possible expulsion of the Zaghawa from Kanem. In this interpretation, Selema is then identified as the last Zaghawa ruler of Kanem.

Although Hummay was of local origin (possibly Kanembu), he and his dynasty claimed descent from the Yemeni noble Saif ibn Dhi Yazan, who was conflated with Kanem's legendary first mai (Susam) in later royal lists. Other Islamic African dynasties of Hummay's time sometimes made similar claims to Arab origin as a source of prestige.

== Reign ==
The further spread of Islam in Hummay's reign may have provoked some dissension in the empire, which caused the Toubou people to break from imperial rule and move east.

Hummay ruled for 12 or 22/23 years. He is recorded to have died in Masr, i.e. Egypt. One source specifies the precise location as "Rukana, of many mosques". The location of his death suggests that he intended to, or perhaps completed, a pilgrimage to Mecca. (Note: Page (2005) states that Hummay performed the pilgrimage to Mecca twice and died in Egypt on his third voyage, accompanied by his son Dunama I Umemi. This is in confusion with the death of Dunama, who died in Egypt while on his third pilgrimage.) Hummay was succeeded as mai by his son Dunama I Umemi. The Sayfawa dynasty ruled the Kanem–Bornu Empire until 1846, becoming one of the longest-ruling dynasties in world history.
