= Abdullah I Bikur =

Mai of the Kanem–Bornu Empire
- Reign: 12th century (14–17 years) c. 1177–1194 (Note: King lists (girgams) and chronicles translated in the 19th–20th centuries assign Abdullah a reign of 14 years (Nachtigal), 15 years (Landeroin), or 17 years (Barth, Palmer, Urvoy). Due to this and to differing dates and calculations for other mais, various dates have been given for his reign, including 1177–1193 (Barth), 1177–1194 (Palmer), 1193–1210 (Urvoy), 1175–1190 (Landeroin), and 1232–1246 (Nachtigal). Cohen (1966) considered a reign of 17 years most likely. Lange (1984) dated Abdullah's reign to 1166–1182 and Stewart (1989) dated it to 1176–1194. Bosworth (2012) assigned a longer reign to Abdullah than other authors, dating his reign to 1174–1194 (20 years).)
- Predecessor: Biri I Uthman
- Successor: Selema II
- Died: c. 1194 "Fafsa" or "Bebeji"
- Spouse: Huwa
- Issue: Selema II
- Dynasty: Sayfawa dynasty
- Father: Biri I Uthman (Note: Barth identified Abdullah's father as "Bikoru ben Biri" (Bikoru, son of Biri), indicating Abdullah to be Biri's grandson rather than son. All others (Palmer, Urvoy, Landeroin, Nachtigal) designate Abdullah as Biri's son.)
- Mother: Zainab

Abdullah I (Note: Abdullah is also recorded as Dala.) (ʿAbdallāh bin ʿUthmān), called Abdullah Bikur, (Note: Bikur is also spelled Bikorom, Bukr, Beker, and Bikoru.) was mai (ruler) of the Kanem–Bornu Empire in the late 12th century, ruling approximately 1177–1194.

== Life ==
Abdullah was a son of mai Biri I Uthman. His mother was named Zainab and was of Toubou origin. In his youth, Abdullah and his brother Bitku were given a hundred camels each by their grandmother Fasama. The camels given to Abdullah were called Bikoru, perhaps the source of his name, and those given to Bitku were called Bitku.

Abdullah succeeded his father as mai in the mid-to-late 12th century. He ruled for 14 to 17 years. The site of his death is recorded as Fafsa (or Fifisi) or Bebeji "of many kurna trees". He was succeeded as mai by his son Selema II.
