= Selema II =

Mai of the Kanem–Bornu Empire
- Reign: 12th/13th century (20–28 years) c. 1194–1221 (Note: King lists (girgams) and chronicles translated in the 19th–20th centuries assign Dunama a reign of 20 years (Nachtigal, Landeroin), 27 years (Barth, Palmer), or 28 years (Urvoy). Due to this and to differing dates and calculations for other mais, various dates have been given for his reign, including 1194–1220 (Barth) 1194–1221 (Palmer), 1193–1210 (Urvoy), 1190–1210 (Landeroin), and 1246–1266 (Nachtigal). Cohen considered a reign of 20 years most likely. Lange (1984) dated Selema's reign to 1182–1210. Both Stewart (1989) and Bosworth (2012) used Palmer's dates, 1194–1221.)
- Predecessor: Abdullah I Bikur
- Successor: Dunama II Dibalemi
- Died: c. 1221 "Jejéska Ghazrwána"
- Spouse: Dibala
- Issue: Dunama II Dibalemi
- Dynasty: Sayfawa dynasty
- Father: Abdullah I Bikur
- Mother: Huwa (Note: Selema's mother was called Huwa according to Barth and Kime according to Palmer. Cohen (1966) believed Barth's version was more likely.)

Selema II (Sǝlǝma (Note: Several rulers of Kanem–Bornu are recorded with both Arabic and Kanuri names and scholars vary in which name is preferred. Sǝlǝma is this ruler's Kanuri name and is, among others, preferred by Cohen (1966). The ǝ:s in Sǝlǝma are pronounced similar to the oo sound in book or look. Sǝlǝma means "black" or "dark-skinned" in Kanuri and may be a nickname. In Selema II's case, the name is also recorded as Salma, Selma, Tselma, Tsilim, and Chulum.) bin ʿAbdallāh), also recorded as Abd al-Jalil (ʿAbd al-Jalīl bin ʿAbdallāh), (Note: The name is also recorded in the forms Abdul Jalil and Jilim.) was mai (ruler) of the Kanem–Bornu Empire in the late 12th to early 13th century, ruling approximately 1194–1221. Selema is credited with establishing further dominion over the desert north of Kanem. Although mais had been Muslim for several generations by Selema's time, Selema is credited with furthering Islam's position as the religion of the empire's political elite.

== Life ==
Selema was a son of mai Abdullah I Bikur. His mother was named Huwa and was of Toubou origin, hailing from the Débiri or Dibbiri tribe. Selema succeeded his father as mai in the late 12th century. Later tradition sometimes claimed that Selema was the first dark-skinned ruler of Kanem, while earlier rulers looked like Arabs. This reflected a fictional Arabized origin legend for the royal line to connect the rulers of the empire with wider Islamic history; the rulers of the empire were undoubtedly dark-skinned since its beginning. Selema's name means "black" or "dark-skinned" and may be a later nickname.

Selema was a powerful ruler, and oversaw a successful and prosperous reign. Selema is claimed by the girgam (royal chronicle of the empire) to have extended his dominion over "the whole desert", a fanciful feat reportedly possible due to his good relations with rulers in North Africa. Although mais had been Muslim for several generations by Selema's time, Selema is often credited as the mai responsible for firmly and fully establishing Islam as the religion of the empire's political elite.

Selema ruled for between 20 and 28 years. He died at a site recorded as Jejéska Ghazrwána (or variations thereof, such as Fajasaka N'gizriwan). and was succeeded as mai by his son Dunama II Dibalemi.
