= James Schön =

German missionary and linguist

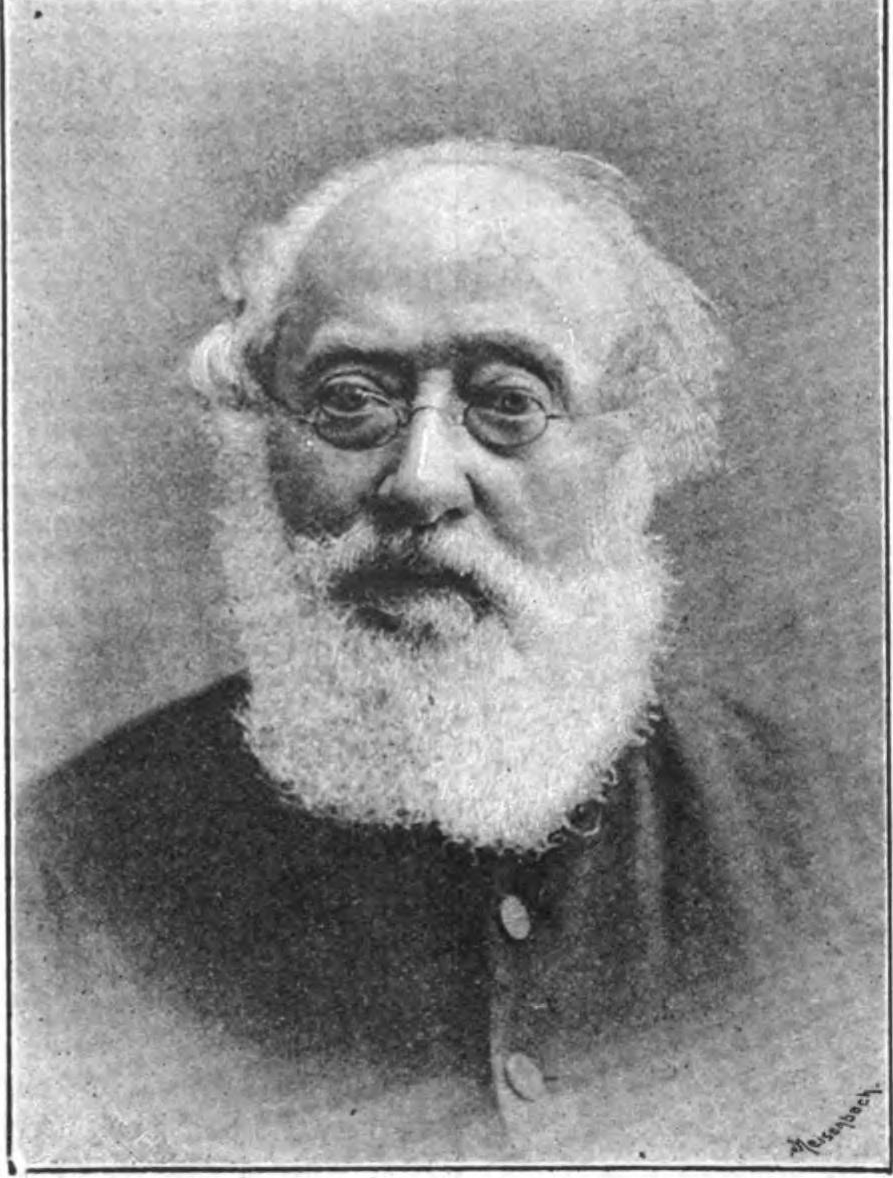

James Frederick Schön (1803, in Oberweiler near Baden – 30 March 1889, in Chatham) was a German missionary and linguist who was active in Sierra Leone. He also participated in the Niger expedition of 1841.

== Biography ==
Schön was born near Baden. After attending the Basel Seminary, Schön attended the Church Missionary Society College in London; he was ordained as a priest in 1832 and immediately went to Sierra Leone. He remained active with the Church Missionary Society until 1853. He became a naturalized British subject in 1854.

He became an expert on the Hausa language and is credited with writing the first Christian material in Hausa when he translated the Lord's Prayer in 1843. He received the Volney Prize for his work on the Hausa language in 1877. He was awarded an honorary doctorate from Oxford University in 1884.

=== Family ===
His first wife was Anne Elizabeth Nyländer, the daughter of Gustavus Nyländer, another missionary and linguist. They had one daughter, Annie Catherine, who married a CMS missionary named Edward Thomas Higgens.

His second wife was Cordelia Jackson Irwine; he later married Elizabeth Catherine Drake, the widow of James White, another CMS missionary. He and Elizabeth had nine children and also took in several other children including Sarah Forbes Bonetta.

=== Works ===
- Translations of seven Parables and Discources of our Lord Jesus Christ into the Sherbro Language of West Africa (1839)
- Journal of the Niger Expedition (1842)
- Vocabulary and Elements of Grammar of the Haussa Language (1843)
- Translations of Genesis, Exodus, the Gospels, and the Acts of the Apostles into the Hausa Language (1857-1861)
- Grammar of the Haussa Language (1862)
- Dictionary of the Hausa Language (1876)
- Vocabulary of the Mende language (1884)
- Magana Hausa: Hausa Stories and Fables (1885)

His papers are archived at the University of Birmingham.

== See also ==
Samuel Ajayi Crowther

Dorugu
