= Kanem (historical region) =

Precolonial historical region in Central Africa, located northeast of Lake Chad

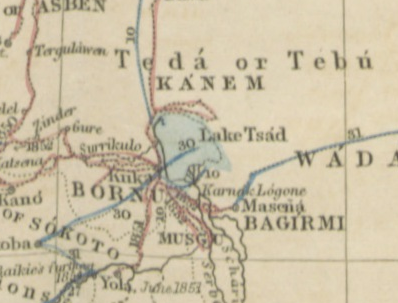
The Lake Chad area, including Kanem, on a 1857 map by August Heinrich Petermann

Kanem, sometimes spelled Kanim or Kánem, is a precolonial historical region in Central Africa, located northeast of Lake Chad. In the modern day, Kanem is located in southwestern Chad and its traditional territory is divided between three administrative regions: Kanem, Lac, and Bahr el Gazel.

Kanem was the cradle and original heartland of the Kanem–Bornu Empire, which was established c. 700. The Kanem–Bornu Empire ruled Kanem until the 14th century, when Kanem was conquered by the Bilala and the center of the empire shifted to Bornu, west of Lake Chad. The Bilala established their own kingdom in Kanem and ruled the region until the 17th century. The Kanem–Bornu Empire then established a vassal state in the region, ruled by the Dalatoa. Dalatoa-ruled Kanem was subjected to various surrounding states and groups until European colonisation during the Scramble for Africa in the early 20th century.

== Geography ==
Kanem is bordered in the east by Lake Chad, by the fringes of the Sahara in the north (approximately latitude 15.5° N), and approximately latitude 13°N in the south. In the modern Republic of Chad, the traditional Kanem region is divided between different administrative units: Kanem in the west and northwest, Lac in the southwest, and Bahr el Gazel in the south.

Most of Kanem is covered by Sahelian savanna vegetation, i.e. grasslands with scattered trees, an environment that has been relatively consistent for the last two or three millennia. One of the major landmarks in the region is the Bahr el Ghazal River; in Chad, this river only has flowing water in the wet season.

== Modern demographics ==
Several different groups inhabit Kanem. The largest group in Kanem is the Kanembu people (Kanembu means "people of Kanem"). Other prominent groups include the Buduma people in the west, the Toubou people in the center, north, east, and south, and Arabs in the north. Smaller groups include the Tunjur, Bilala, Kuka, and Haddad peoples.

== Prehistory and archaeology ==
Kanem has been poorly researched archaeologically, in part because of political limitations and difficulty of access. As a result, very little is known of the prehistory of the region. In 2019–2022, the German Research Foundation (DFG) funded a project to investigate still unexplored archaeological and oral historical evidence of the early Kanem–Bornu Empire, the first time archaeological excavations were carried out in Kanem. Prior to this project, several sites of interest had been located, including several fire brick ruins, presumed to be remnants of residences of royalty or elites. The earliest surveys of these sites were conducted by the sociologist Annie Lebeuf in the 1950s. By 2022, ninety fire brick sites had been identified in Kanem, the largest of which was Tié.

Due to limited research, it has been difficult to reliably link the fire brick sites to the Kanem–Bornu Empire or any other civilization. In 2025, several fire brick sites were luminescence and radiocarbon dated by Carlos Magnavita, Susanne Lindauer, and Adoum Casimir Adjbane to between 700 and 1400 CE, corresponding to the timeframe during which the Kanem–Bornu Empire ruled Kanem. The dates obtained suggested that these sites developed gradually across the region over the course of this timeframe.

Because of the limited research, it is unclear when Kanem was first settled by humans. The wider inner Chad Basin region has been inhabited at least as far back as the 6th millennium BCE.

== Precolonial history ==
=== Duguwa and Sayfawa rule (Kanem–Bornu Empire, c. 700–1380) ===
Kanem was the cradle and original heartland of the Kanem–Bornu Empire, established c. 700. The process of the empire's state formation is largely unknown. The establishment of the empire probably coincided with the appearance of walled cities in the region. The original capital of Kanem was probably Njimi, yet to be satisfactorily located. The empire was sustained by the trans-Saharan trade; the rulers of the empire could participate in international trade and were able to levy taxes and duties on trade groods. A wide variety of goods were exported from Kanem, including ivory, slaves, and animal products.

The original royal dynasty of the empire was the so-called Duguwa dynasty. In the 11th century, the Duguwa mai (ruler) Hu converted to Islam. Hu's successor Selema I was overthrown by mai Hummay (also Muslim), who established the new Sayfawa dynasty. Kanem experienced increasing Islamization from the 11th century onwards and was a literate society by the 12th century at the latest.

In the 13th century, the Sayfawa rulers came into conflict with the Bilala, who lived within the empire. In the 14th century, around the year 1380, the Bilala were able to oust the Sayfawa from power in Kanem and capture Njimi. The Sayfawa ruler at the time, mai Umar I Idrismi, relocated across Lake Chad to Bornu, where the Sayfawa re-established their state and continued to rule as they had done in Kanem. Because of its two historical heartlands, the empire ruled by the Sayfawa is typically referred to as a whole as the Kanem–Bornu Empire.

=== Bilala rule (c. 1380–1630) ===
After the ousting of the Sayfawa, the Bilala established their own kingdom in Kanem. Due to few surviving sources, the situation in Kanem under the Bilala is largely unknown, but it was clearly an effective and powerful state that rivaled that of the Sayfawa in Bornu. The Sayfawa attempted to retake Kanem through a series of wars in the 15th and 16th centuries. In the early 16th century, the Sayfawa mai Idris III Katagarmabe conquered Kanem but chose to allow the Bilala to continue to govern the region as vassals.

The Bilala kingdom fell around 1630, when the Wadai Sultanate drove the Bilala out of Kanem. The Bilala fled east to the lands around Lake Fitri, where they re-established themselves.

=== Dalatoa rule (c. 1630–1902) ===
The Wadai Sultanate and surrounding states, including Kanem (here spelled "Kawem"), 1890

When the Bilala were driven from Kanem, the Tunjur people, who had been expelled from Wadai, attempted to take control of Kanem. The Sayfawa rulers of Bornu intervened and sent an army under the general Dala Afuno to fight against the Tunjur and Wadai forces and secure the eastern side of Lake Chad. Dala successfully reconquered the region and was made viceroy of Kanem. He established a new lineage of Kanembu rulers, the so-called Dalatoa, who governed Kanem in the centuries that followed.

The history of the 17th and 18th century in Kanem is largely unknown due to a lack of written sources. Oral history paints this time as one of great turmoil, with internal unrest and large-scale internal and external population movements. The Dalatoa rulers were sometimes recognized only nominally, and subjects to various states and groups, not only the Sayfawa. In the late 19th century, British geographers William Hughes and John Francon Williams recorded that Kanem was a vassal state of the Wadai Sultanate, divided from "Wadai proper" by the Bahr el Ghazal valley. Kanem was at the time "held in subjection" by the Ouled Slimane Arabs from Fezzan.

Kanem experienced about two decades of civil war and strife in the late 19th century (c. 1880–1899) and was by 1899 in a state of anarchy and largely in ruins. The people of the region attributed this state of affairs to raiding and marauding by the Ouled Slimane, who at the time were divided between the antagonistic sheikhs Raouss and F'Dinn. The nominally legitimate ruler of Kanem by this time was Halifa Djerab, a Dalatoa dynast appointed by the Wadai Sultanate. Halifa Djerab was driven from his seat at Mao by sheikh Raouss, who raised his cousin Halifa Agui as a puppet ruler in his stead, though Halifa Djerab continued to rule from Débénenki. The Wadai Sultanate never intervened against the Ouled Slimane and none of the powers in the region exercised widely recognized authority.

French colonial forces entered into Kanem in connection to the Voulet–Chanoine Mission. In the 1890s, French signed several treaties with local chiefs as preparation for colonization, preceding the beginning of military conquest in 1900. In 1899, a protectorate treaty was signed with elements of the Dalatoa. Halifa Agui declared himself an enemy of the French but was killed by French forces on 4 January 1900, leaving Halifa Djerab as the only legitimate representative of the Dalatoa. The French soon allied themselves with the Ouled Slimane and fought against the Tuareg and the Senussi order. A decisive French victory at Korofu (between Mao and Bir Alali) on 11 August 1902 cemented French control of Kanem.

== See also ==
- History of Central Africa
