= Adolf Overweg =

German astronomer, geologist, and explorer of Africa

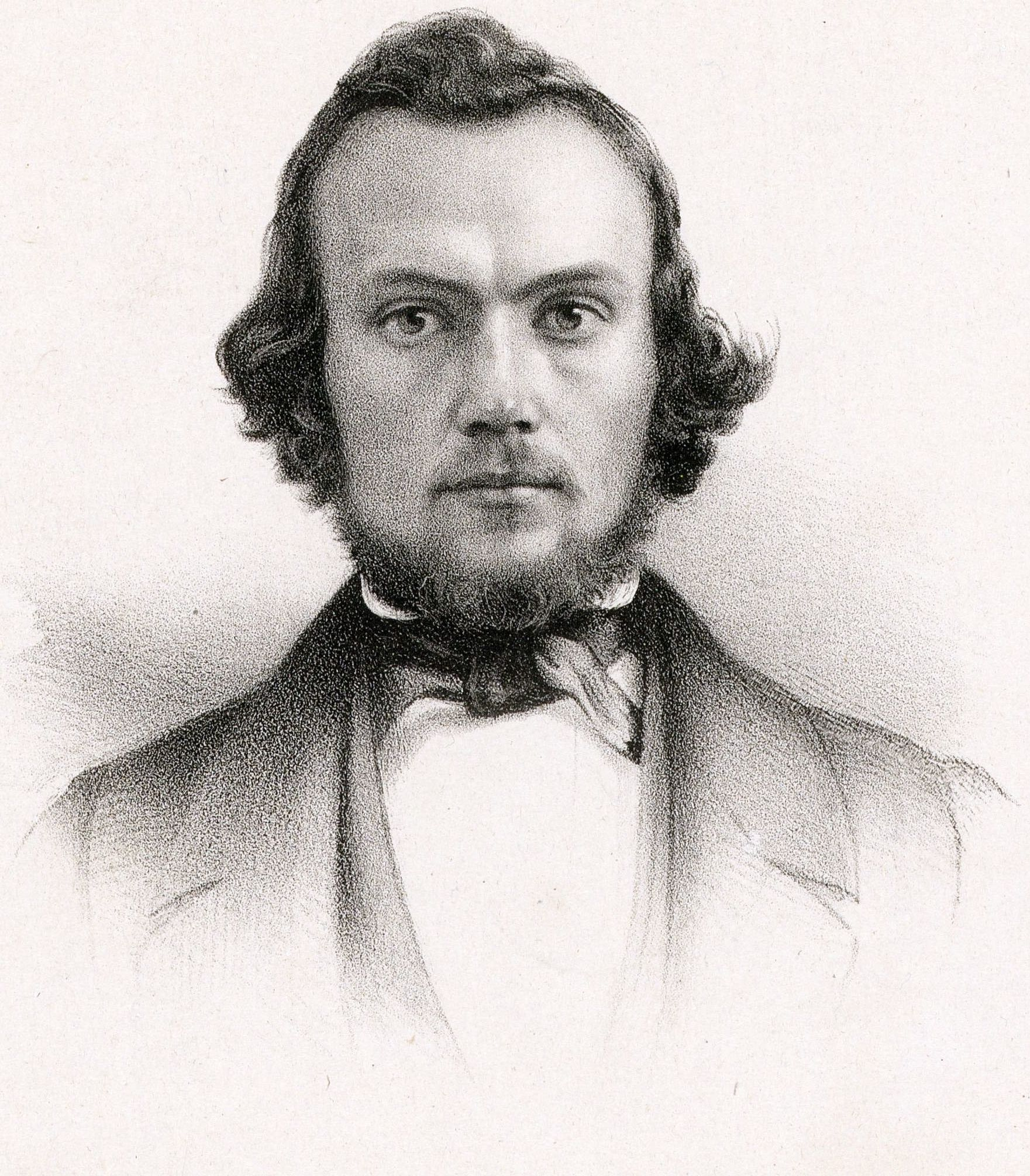
Adolf Overweg

Adolf Overweg (24 July 1822 – 27 September 1852) was a German astronomer, geologist, and explorer of Africa. As a member of a mission to fix trade routes in Central Africa he became the first person of European origin to circumnavigate Lake Chad by boat.

In 1849, he joined a three-man expedition under the command of James Richardson and Heinrich Barth. They set to leave Tripoli in the spring of 1850 to help the British government forge relations with central African kingdoms and explore unknown territory there. They crossed the Sahara carrying a boat on the backs of camels, splitting up in 1851 with Overweg trekking by route of Zinder to Kukawa. After 18 months of exploring the Adamawa Emirate, Benue River, and finally completing his most notable feat of circumnavigating Lake Chad, he died of an unknown illness in Maduari after swimming in cold waters.

Barth and Overweg were close friends. Barth wrote of Overweg's great talents as a scientist and observer, but his lack of discipline in keeping orderly notes, and his youthful disregard for his own safety doomed him to obscurity and an early death in the prime of his youth.
