= James Richardson (explorer) =

British explorer

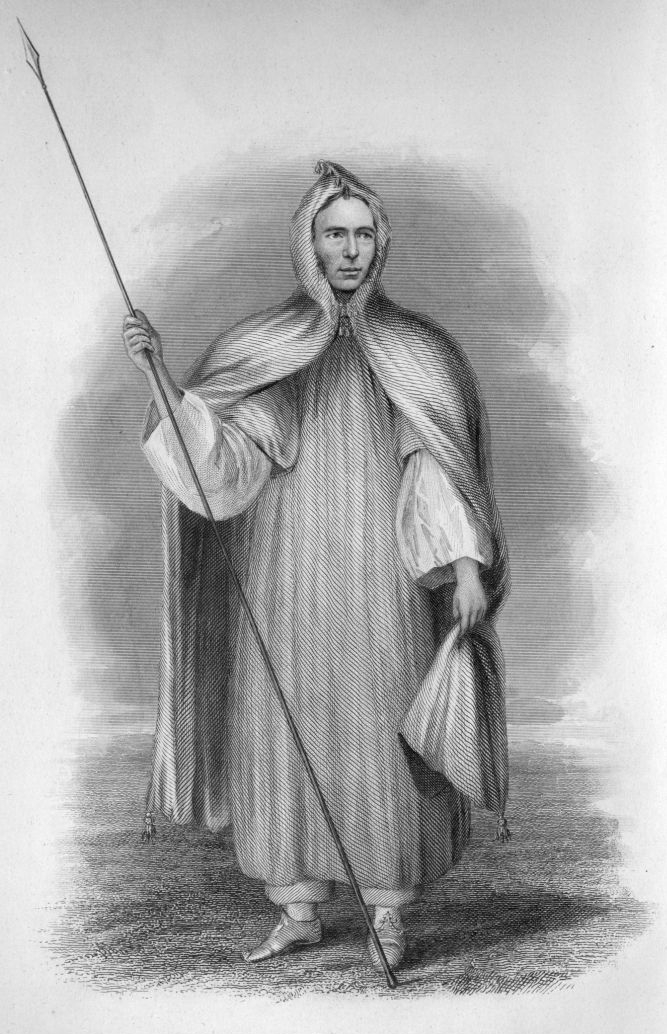
James Richardson in Ghadamsee costume.

James Richardson (3 November 1809 in Boston, Lincolnshire – 4 March 1851 in Ngurutua near Kukawa, Bornu) was a British explorer known for his expeditions into the Sahel region of the Saharan desert.

== Biography ==
Richardson was educated for the evangelical ministry. His early training and enterprising temper produced in adult life an ambition to propagate Christianity and suppress the slave trade in Africa. He attached himself to the British Anti-Slavery Society, and under its auspices he went out to Malta, where he took part in the editing of a newspaper and also engaged in the study of the Arabic language and of geography, with a view to systematic exploration.

Richardson made an expedition in 1845 from Tunis and Tripoli in Libya to Ghadames and Ghat in Libya in the middle of the Sahara. Here he collected information about the Tuareg and after nine months arrived back in Tripoli. After he had published Travels into the great desert of Sahara (2 Books. London 1849), he succeeded in convincing the British government to equip an expedition into Sudan and to Lake Chad. In March 1850, Richardson went for the second time to Ghat accompanied by Heinrich Barth and Adolf Overweg. His party were the first Europeans to cross the stony elevated plain of the Hammada. James Richardson died of unknown illness on this journey on 4 March 1851 in Ngurutua, a six-day journey away from Kukawa near Lake Chad. His travel notes and diaries were published by Bayle Saint John as Narrative of a Mission to Central Africa (1853) and Travels in Morocco (1859).
