= Hu of Kanem =

First Muslim ruler of Kanem

Hu

Mai of the Kanem–Bornu Empire
- Reign: 11th century (4–62 years)
- Predecessor: Arki
- Successor: Selema I
- Spouse: Bure (?)
- Issue: Selema I
- Dynasty: Duguwa dynasty
- Father: Arki
- Mother: Teksuwa

Hu or Hawwa (Hū, Ḥawwāʽ) was the legendary tenth mai (ruler) of the Kanem–Bornu Empire, ruling in the 11th century. As the earliest ruler associated with Islam in the empire's royal chronicle (the girgam), Hu is generally identified as the first Muslim ruler of the empire. Some elements in the source material suggest that Hu might have been a woman, notably that Hawwa is a feminine name.

== Sources ==
Information about Hu comes mainly from the girgam, the orally recited royal chronicle of the Kanem–Bornu Empire, which is mainly known through transcriptions and translations by European explorers, scholars, and colonial officials in various copies in the 19th and 20th centuries, most importantly by Heinrich Barth, Moïse Landeroin, and Gustav Nachtigal. Richmond Palmer later worked with the same material as Barth, with some additions, and Yves Urvoy also published a study in the 1940s attempting to reconcile various sources. Because the long timespan separating Hu from recorded history and the lack of contemporary evidence, Hu and the other mais of the Duguwa dynasty are generally treated as legendary figures of uncertain historicity.

Hu in 19th- and 20th-century European transcriptions of the girgam
Attribute	Barth (1857)	Nachtigal (1881)	Landeroin (1911)	Palmer (1936)
Name	Shú or Húwa	Schû	Siou	Shu
Reign	4 years	62 years	4 years	—
Father	A'rki	Harki	Ariki	Arkaman
Mother	Tefsú	—	—	Teksuwa

Both Barth and Landeroin gave Hu a reign of only four years, which was generally accepted by later authors, such as Yves Urvoy (1941), Ronald Cohen (1966), and Dierk Lange and B. W. Barkindo (1992). Nachtigal's version of the king list gave Hu a considerably longer reign of 62 years. By counting back in different versions of the king lists, Nachtigal speculatively dated Hu's reign to 1005–1067, Landeroin to 1062–1066, Urvoy to 1077–1081, and Lange and Barkindo to 1067–1071.

The girgam records Hu under three slightly different names depending on the version: Sū (or Sawā), Ladsū, and Hū (Ḥawwāʽ). Hū or Ḥawwāʽ is believed to be the correct version of the name. Palmer suggested that the version Sū (Shu) meant "great", based on the Ethiopian title Shum.

== Life ==
According to the girgam, Hu was a child of their predecessor, Arki. The name of Hu's mother is given as Tefsú by Barth Tagasu by Palmer (1926), and Teksuwa by Palmer (1936) and Cohen. Hu's mother was "daughter of Gayu, of the tribe of Tumagari". The girgam states that Hu was "invested by the caliph" or "made caliph", interpreted as meaning that Hu was a Muslim. The rulers of Kanem converted to Islam in the 11th century and Hu is often identified as the first Muslim ruler of the empire. It is not clear if Hu converted in their reign or was already Muslim when they acceded to the throne. The term "invested" could imply an unorthodox rise to the throne. A pro-Islam faction at the royal court might have put forth Hu as the strongest Muslim claimant for the throne they could find after Arki's death.

Barth noted that Hu was "distinguished by his fine figure" and speculated that this might mean that Hu was an effeminate man. In 1988, Lange stated that although the girgam refers to Hu as male, the name Ḥawwāʽ implies that Hu could have been a woman: Hawwa is a feminine name and the Arabic name for Eve. The many different version of Hu's name could be explained by later scribes attempting to hide that Hu was female. The possibility that Hu was a woman has also been raised by several later authors, including Philip Koslow, Timothy Insoll, and Barry Cunliffe, sometimes by outright designating Hu as a queen. Later tradition claims that Hu was a seducer (or seductress), with one copy of the girgam recording that "There once entered to [Hu] a girl —a daughter of the royal house—and seduced [Hu] by her wiles. They saw her wearing seven gowns by reason of her blandishments. Therefore daughters of the royal house are prohibited from visiting the Sultan."

If a reign of only four years is correct, Hu might have ruled at a time of intense internal crisis as the empire transitioned from officially following traditional religions to Islam. There may also have been struggles between adherents of different branches of Islam. Hu might have been an adherent of Ibadi Islam, whereas Sunni Islam was eventually triumphant in Kanem. According to Barth, Hu died at a site called Ghanta Kamna. Palmer (1926) recorded the similar name Ghanata (Ghana) Agaman (Tagaman). Palmer (1928) stated that Hu was buried at a site called Kutushi Kôwan, which Palmer placed "east of the country now called Damarghu and Damagaram". Per the girgam, Hu was succeeded as mai by their son, Selema I. Hu's consort (and Selema's other parent) might have been named Bure, though that name is given only by Palmer.
