= Johann Martin Bernatz =

German artist (1802–1878)

- Born: 22 March 1802; Speyer
- Died: 19 December 1878 (aged 76); Munich
- Occupation: landscape artist

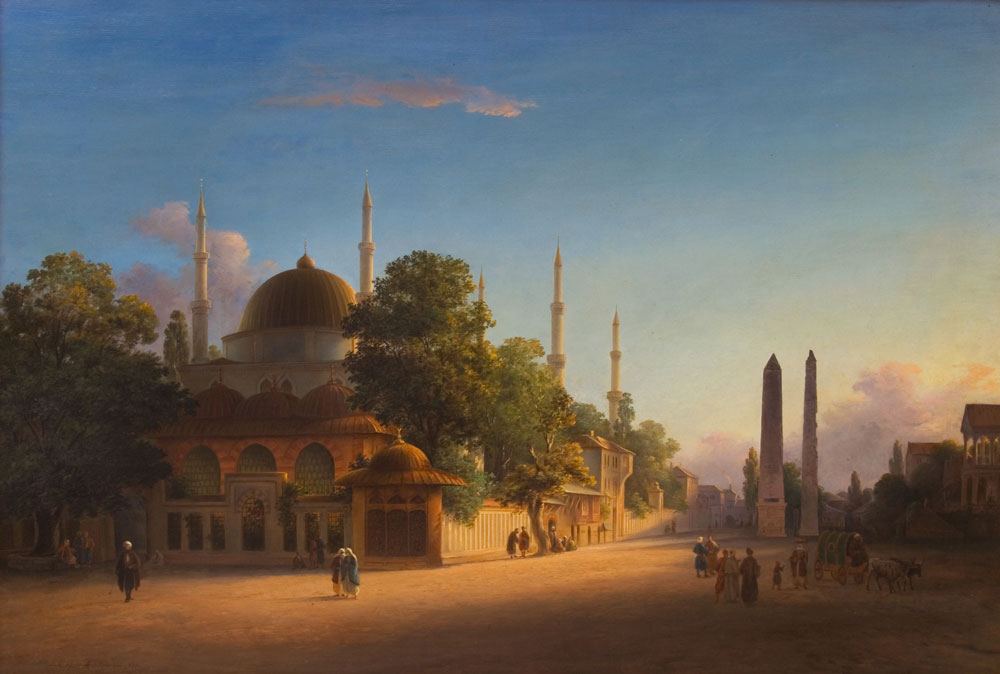
The Sultan Ahmed Mosque in Istanbul

Johann Martin Bernatz (22 March 1802 – 19 December 1878) was a German landscape artist. Born in Speyer and trained in Vienna, Austria, he spent much of his life in Munich. He accompanied an expedition to Egypt and the Holy Land in 1836, and a British embassy to Ethiopia in 1842; drawings made during both journeys were published as sets of lithographs.

== Life ==
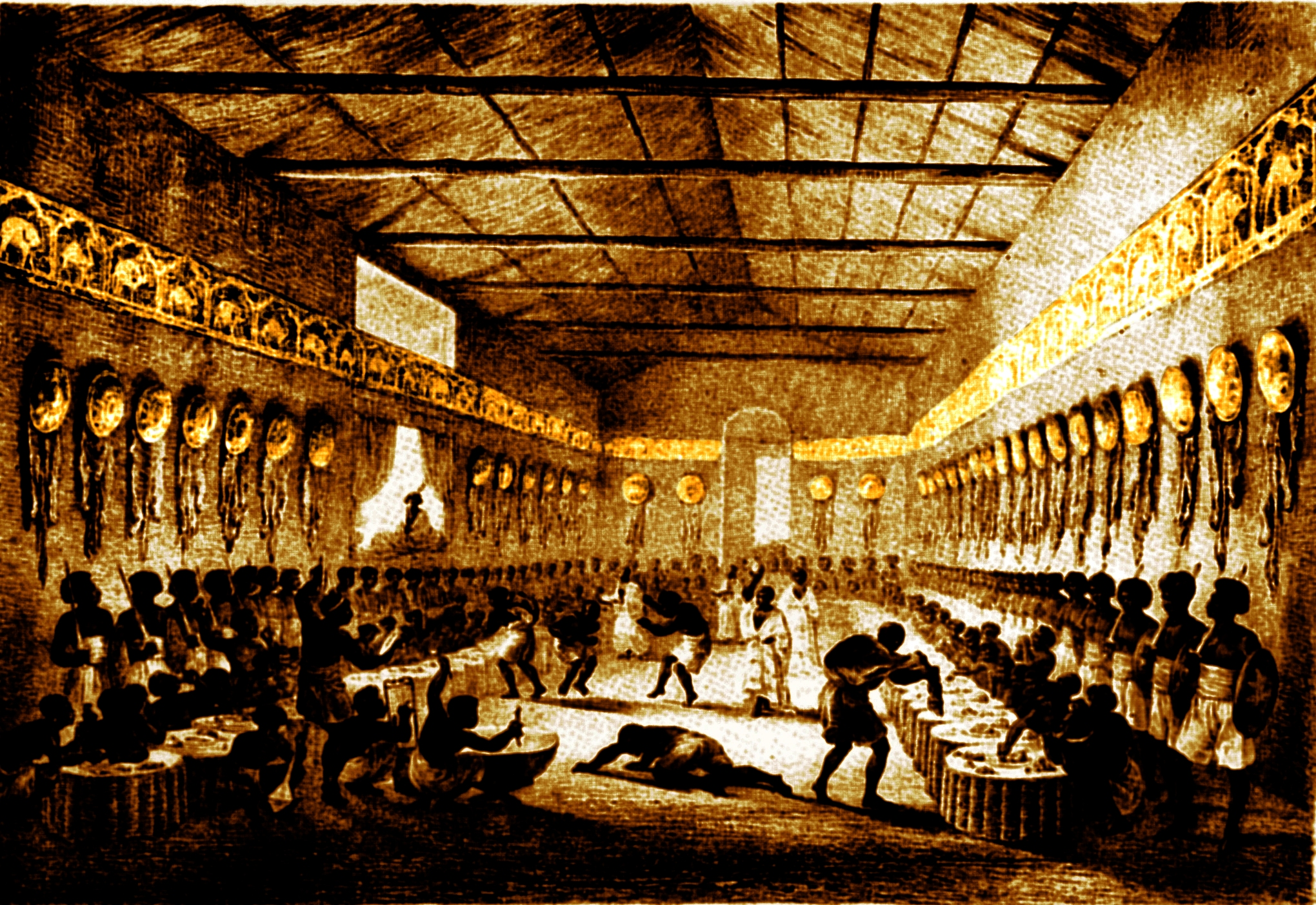
The banquet hall in King Sahla Sellases palace, from Scenes in Aethiopia (London 1852). Colours not original.

Bernatz was born in Speyer on 22 March 1802. He began his artistic education, comparatively late in life, at the Academy at Vienna.

In 1829, he went to Munich, where he was commissioned to make drawings of various ancient buildings for King Ludwig I. In 1836, he joined Gotthilf Heinrich von Schubert's expedition to Egypt, travelling from Istanbul through Asia Minor, Palestine, and the Sinai Peninsula. Forty pictures he made on the journey were published as Bilder aus dem heiligen Lande, nach der Natur gezeichnet ("Pictures from the Holy Land, Drawn from Nature") in 1839. This led to an invitation to accompany Johannes Roth on an expedition to India. Bernatz made the voyage to Calcutta, but various obstacles prevented the expedition from taking place. In 1842 he visited Africa, the British authorities in India having decided to employ him as an official artist to an embassy, led by Captain William Cornwallis Harris to Sahela Selassie, the king of Shoa. A set of lithographs of his drawings from this journey were published in London in 1852 as Scenes of Ethiopia. German editions followed.

Bernatz settled as a landscape painter in Munich, where he died on 19 December 1878.

== See also ==
- List of German painters
