= Selema I =

Last mai of the Duguwa dynasty

Mai of the Kanem–Bornu Empire
- Reign: 11th century (4–62 years)
- Predecessor: Hu
- Successor: Hummay
- Spouse: Tigiram (?)
- Issue: Hummay (?)
- Parents: Hu and Bure (?)
- Dynasty: Duguwa dynasty

Selema I (Sǝlǝma), (Note: Several rulers of Kanem–Bornu are recorded with both Arabic and Kanuri names and scholars vary in which name is preferred. Sǝlǝma is this ruler's Kanuri name and is, among others, preferred by Cohen (1966). The ǝ:s in Sǝlǝma are pronounced similar to the oo sound in book or look. Sǝlǝma means "black" or "dark-skinned" in Kanuri and may be a nickname.) also recorded as Abd al-Jalil (ʿAbd al-Jalīl) and Abdullah (ʿAbdallāh), was the legendary eleventh mai (ruler) of the Kanem–Bornu Empire, ruling in the 11th century. Selema is identified in the sources as the last mai of Kanem's original royal line, the Duguwa dynasty. The nature of Selema's relation to his successor Hummay, and Hummay's rise to the throne, are unclear.

== Sources ==
Information about Selema comes mainly from the girgam, the orally recited royal chronicle of the Kanem–Bornu Empire, which is mainly known through transcriptions and translations by European explorers, scholars, and colonial officials in various copies in the 19th and 20th centuries, most importantly by Heinrich Barth, Moïse Landeroin, and Gustav Nachtigal. Richmond Palmer later worked with the same material as Barth, with some additions, and Yves Urvoy also published a study in the 1940s attempting to reconcile various sources. Because the long timespan separating Selema from recorded history and the lack of contemporary evidence, Selema and the other mais of the Duguwa dynasty are generally treated as legendary figures of uncertain historicity.

Selema I in 19th- and 20th-century European transcriptions of the girgam
Attribute	Barth (1857)	Nachtigal (1881)	Landeroin (1911)	Palmer (1936)
Name	Selma or ʽAbd el Jelíl	ʽAbdallâh	Abdallah	ʽAbd ul Jalil
Reign	4 years	62 years	4 years	—
Father	Shú	Schû	Djelil	Chou
Mother	"a woman of the tribe of the Ghemarma"	—	—	Bure

Similar as for Selema's direct predecessor Hu, both Barth and Landeroin gave Selema a reign of only four years, which was generally accepted by later authors, such as Yves Urvoy (1941), Ronald Cohen (1966), and Dierk Lange and B. W. Barkindo (1992). Nachtigal's version of the king list gave Selema a considerably longer reign of 62 years, also the same length of time as Nachtigal gives Hu. By counting back in different versions of the king lists, Nachtigal speculatively dated Selema's reign to 1067–1129, Landeroin to 1066–1070, and Urvoy to 1081–1085.

In another girgam translated by Palmer, Selema's (Abd al-Jalil's) name was given simply as Jil, which Palmer interpreted as possibly related to "Jion or Ajon, the Jukon equivalent of the Egyptian god “Osiris”".

== Life ==
Most versions of the girgam present Selema as the son of his direct predecessor, Hu, who may have been a woman. Landeroin instead states that Selema was the son of a man named Djelil, with unclear relations to preceding mais. Selema's other parent may have been named Bure, though that name is only given by Palmer. Barth identifies Selema's mother as a "woman of the tribe of the Gemarma (Maghárma?)". Palmer identifies her as "a daughter of Bikoru, of the clan of the Amarma (i.e. of the Kauwar Oasis)".

Selema was the second Muslim ruler of Kanem, after Hu. He may have ruled at a time of intense internal crisis as the empire transitioned from officially following traditional religions to Islam. Selema was followed on the throne by Hummay, who is considered the founder of a new dynastic line, the Sayfawa dynasty. The girgam nevertheless presents Hummay as Selema's son, making the nature of this dynastic shift unclear. The name of Hummay's mother, and thus Selema's consort is given by Barth as Tikramma and by Palmer as Tigiram.

According to Barth, Selema died at a site called Ghumzú. Palmer stated that Selema was buried at a site called Masar. One girgam translated by Palmer in 1912 refers to Masar as "Masar of many mosques". A girgam translated by Palmer in 1926 places Selema's death in "the land of the Gamaram (i.e. Damarghu)".

== Dynastic shift ==
The girgam places the emphasis of the dynastic shift from Duguwa to Sayfawa on adherence to Islam. The passage about Selema ends with "That is what we have written about the history of the Banū Dūkū; (Note: "Descendants of Duku", i.e. the Duguwa dynasty) we shall now proceed to set down the history of the Banū Ḥummay, (Note: "Descendants of Hummay", i.e. the Sayfawa dynasty) who professed Islam". The difference between the Duguwa and Sayfawa mais has thus often been interpreted, for instance by Barth in 1857, as merely religious, with both technically being the same royal lineage. This interpretation is demonstrably incorrect since both Selema and Hu were Muslims.

The dynastic shift may be a reference to Selema being overthrown by Hummay, who could have been falsely linked to the former dynasty as Selema's supposed son in the royal chronicle. The reason for Selema's overthrow in this case is unknown. Hummay might have been an adherent of Sunni Islam whereas Selema and Hu were Ibadi Muslims. Kanem is generally believed to have been founded by the Zaghawa people, who are associated with the kingdom in Arab sources from the 9th to the 11th century. In the 12th century, the Zaghawa are attested as a separate entity from Kanem, living as nomads in the northeast. Hummay's rise to power could thus be linked to a possible expulsion of the Zaghawa from Kanem. In this interpretation, Selema is then identified as the last Zaghawa ruler of Kanem.
