= List of committees of the National Assembly of Nigeria =

This is a list of the standing committees of the National Assembly of Nigeria. There are currently 57 standing committees in the Nigerian Senate, while the House of Representatives currently has 89 standing committees.

== Standing Committees ==
=== Senate ===
- Senate Committee on Appropriation
- Senate Committee on Air Force
- Senate Committee on Health
- Senate Committee on Environment
- Senate Committee on Banking/Insurance
- Senate Committee on Marine transport
- Senate committee on National planning
- Senate Committee on Women Affairs
- Senate committee on finance
- Senate committee on integration and cooperation
- Senate Committee on Education
- Senate Committee on National security & Intelligence
- Senate Committee on Up Stream Petroleum Sector
- Senate Committee on Power
- Senate Committee on Federal Capital Territory (FCT)
- Senate Committee on Defence and Army
- Senate Committee on National Population
- Senate Committee on Works
- Senate Committee on Housing
- Senate Committee on Gas
- Senate Committee on Capital Market
- Senate Committee on Ethics
- Senate Committee on Information, Media and Publicity
- Senate Committee on Federal Character
- Senate Committee on Solid Minerals
- Senate Committee on Public Account
- Senate Committee on Industries
- Senate Committee on Commerce, Land Transport
- Senate Committee on Business and Rule Committee
- Senate Committee on Niger Delta Development Committee
- Senate Services Committee
- Senate Committee on Agriculture
- Senate Committee on Water Resources
- Senate Committee on Communication
- Senate Committee on Foreign Affairs
- Senate Committee on Science and Technology
- Senate Committee on Sports
- Senate Committee on Aviation
- Senate Committee on INEC Committee
- Senate Committee on Establishment and Public Services
- Senate Committee on Police Affairs
- Senate Committee on Drugs and Narcotics
- Senate Committee on Culture and Tourism

=== House of Representatives ===
- House Committee on Anti-Corn, National Ethics & Value
- House Committee on the Air Force
- House Committee on the Army
- House Committee on Aviation
- House Committee on Banking and Currency
- House Committee on the Capital Market
- House Committee on Commerce
- House Committee on Communication
- House Committee on Cooperation, Integration and NEPAD
- House Committee on Culture and Tourism
- House Committee on Defense
- House Committee on Drugs, Narcotics and Financial Crimes
- House Committee on Basic Education and Services
- House Committee on Electoral Matters
- House Committee on Employment and Productivity
- House Committee on the Environment
- House Committee on Ethics and Privilege
- House Committee on the Federal Executive Territory
- House Committee on Federal Character
- House Committee on Finance
- House Committee on Foreign Affairs
- House Committee on Gas
- House Committee on Government Affairs
- House Committee on Habitat
- House Committee on Health
- House Committee on Information and National Orientation
- House Committee on House Service
- House Committee on Housing and Habitat
- House Committee on Human Rights
- House Committee on Industries
- House Committee on Inter Parliamentary
- House Committee on Internal Affairs
- House Committee on Judiciary
- House Committee on Justice
- House Committee on Legislative Budget
- House Committee on Loans, Aid and Debt Management
- House Committee on Marine Transport
- House Committee on National Planning and Population
- House Committee on National Security
- House Committee on the Navy
- House Committee on Niger Delta Development
- House Committee on Peace and National Reconciliation
- House Committee on Petroleum Resources (Down Stream)
- House Committee on Petroleum Resources (UpStream)
- House Committee on Police Affairs
- House Committee on Poverty Alleviation
- House Committee on Power
- House Committee on Privatization and Commercialization
- House Committee on Public Account
- House Committee on Public Petition
- House Committee on Public Service Matters
- House Committee on Rules & Business
- House Committee on Rural Development
- House Committee on Science and Technology
- House Committee on Solid Mineral
- House Committee on Special Duties
- House Committee on Sports
- House Committee on State and Local Government Affairs
- House Committee on Transport
- House Committee on Water Resources
- House Committee on Women's Affairs
- House Committee on Works
- House Committee on Local Content
- House Committee on Diaspora

=== House of Assembly ===
- Joint Committee on Agriculture and Rural Development
- Joint Committee on Labour and Productivity, Petroleum Resources and Justice
- Joint Committee on Finance, Appropriation and Electoral Matters
- Joint Committee on Health and Commerce
