= 2015 Borno bombing =

2015 Borno bombing may refer to:

- January 2015 Maiduguri suicide bombing
- March 2015 Maiduguri suicide bombing
- June 2015 Monguno bombing
- August 2015 Borno bombing
- September 2015 Borno State bombings
- October 2015 Maiduguri and Yola bombings
- December 2015 Madagali and Maiduguri bombings
