= House Committee on Basic Education and Services =

Legislative committee of the Nigerian national assembly

- House committee providing oversight on basic education in Nigeria
- Abbreviation: HCBE
- Founder: National Assembly of Nigeria
- Type: Standing Committee
- Legal status: Active
- Purpose: Legislative oversight on basic education and policy implementation
- Headquarters: National Assembly, Abuja, Nigeria
- Region served: Nigeria
- Official language: English
- Chairman: Mark Bako Useni
- Deputy Chairman: Mukhtar Shagaya
- Main organ: Federal House of Representatives
- Parent organization: National Assembly of Nigeria
- Affiliations: Federal Ministry of Education, Universal Basic Education Commission
- Website: www.nass.gov.ng
- Remarks: Oversees Nigeria's basic education development and services

The House Committee on Basic Education and Services is a standing committee of the Nigerian House of Representatives, responsible for legislative oversight and advancing basic education policies in Nigeria. Working alongside its Senate counterpart, the committee ensures effective implementation of education programs and regulatory frameworks. Its oversight extends to agencies such as the Universal Basic Education Commission (UBEC) and the Federal Ministry of Education, making it an influential body in shaping Nigeria's education sector.

== History ==
=== Constitutional Basis ===
The House Committee on Basic Education and Services establishment finds its foundation in the Nigerian Constitution, which assigns legislative oversight functions to the National Assembly. Chapter II, Section 18 of the 1999 Constitution of Nigeria (as amended) states:

"Government shall direct its policy towards ensuring equal and adequate educational opportunities at all levels".

This provision underscores the importance of legislative oversight in achieving equitable and quality education across the country. The National Assembly, through its various committees, is empowered to monitor and influence the implementation of education policies and programs.

=== Formation ===
The House Committee on Basic Education and Services was established as part of the standing committees of the Nigerian House of Representatives. The committee's formation stemmed from the growing need to address challenges in Nigeria's basic education sector, including access, quality, and funding.

=== Early years ===
In its initial years, the committee worked closely with the Universal Basic Education Commission (UBEC) and the Federal Ministry of Education to oversee the implementation of the Universal Basic Education (UBE) program, introduced in 1999 to provide free, compulsory education for Nigerian children. Through legislative hearings, oversight visits, and budgetary appropriations, the committee ensured the expansion of access to education, particularly in underserved regions.

=== Growth and influence ===
Over time, the committee's influence grew as education became a national priority, especially with Nigeria's commitment to achieving the Sustainable Development Goals (SDGs) related to education. The committee played a vital role in monitoring and evaluating federal government interventions, including the distribution of funds under the UBE scheme. Its oversight activities now include public hearings, legislative bills aimed at improving educational standards, and direct engagements with state governments to ensure compliance with federal education mandates.

== See also ==
- Federal Ministry of Education (Nigeria)
- House Committee on Finance (Nigeria)
- House Committee on Aids, Loans and Debt Management
- Universal Basic Education Commission
- National Assembly of Nigeria
