= Shagaya =

- Language: Tarok language

Origin
- Region of origin: West Africa

Other names
- Variant form: Sagaya

Shagaya is a surname among the Tarok people of Plateau State, Nigeria. Notable people with the surname include:

- Bola Shagaya, Nigerian transport mogul
- John Nanzip Shagaya, Nigerian senator and former senior military officer
- Sim Shagaya, Nigerian technology entrepreneur and founder of Konga.
- Muktar Tolani Shagaya, Nigerian politician and a member of the House of Representatives for Ilorin/Asa Federal Constituency of Kwara State
