= Industrial Training Fund =

Nigerian Government Agency

Industrial Training Fund (ITF)
- Formation: 8 October 1971
- Founder: Federal Government of Nigeria
- Type: Government Agency
- Legal status: Active
- Headquarters: Miango Road, Jos, Plateau State, Nigeria
- Region served: Nigeria
- Official language: English
- Key people: Afiz Oluwatoyin Ogun (Director General)
- Main organ: Board of Directors
- Parent organization: Federal Ministry of Industry, Trade and Investment
- Subsidiaries: Industrial Skills Training Centres (ISTCs), Model Skills Training Centres (MSTCs), Area Offices (located across Nigeria)
- Affiliations: Federal Government of Nigeria, Nigerian Employers Consultative Association (NECA)
- Budget: ₦50 billion (2024 estimate)
- Revenue: Primarily funded through contributions from employers and the federal government
- Employees: Over 5,000 (2023 estimate)
- Website: www.itf.gov.ng

The Industrial Training Fund (ITF) is a Nigerian government agency established on 8 October 1971, by the Federal Government of Nigeria through the Industrial Training Fund Act. Its primary mission is to provide skills acquisition and industrial training programs across Nigeria, with the aim of developing the nation's human resources to support industrial growth and economic diversification.

== History ==
The ITF was established on 8 October 1971, by the Federal Government of Nigeria through the enactment of Decree No. 47 of 1971. The creation of the ITF was a response to the growing need for skilled manpower in the industrial and commercial sectors, which were hindering the country's economic development. At the time, Nigeria faced a severe shortage of skilled labor, which was seen as a significant barrier to industrial growth and modernization.

The ITF was created under the authority of the Federal Government, with the enabling legislation, the Industrial Training Fund Act, providing the legal framework for its establishment. This Act outlined the Fund's objectives, governance structure, and operational guidelines. The primary objective of the ITF is to promote the acquisition of skills within Nigeria's industrial and commercial sectors, thereby supporting the country's economic development by providing a well-trained and capable workforce.

== Purpose and objectives ==
The primary purpose of the ITF is to promote the development of a skilled workforce to meet the manpower requirements of Nigeria's industrial, commercial, and economic sectors. The ITF's mandate is to provide training, support vocational education, and equip individuals with the practical skills required by the Nigerian economy. It aims to create opportunities for Nigerians to participate actively in the nation's industrialization and technological advancements.

=== Key objectives of the ITF include ===
- Promoting Manpower Development: Addresses the growing demand for skilled labor in Nigeria's industries by offering targeted training programs.
- Fostering Industrial Growth: Supports industries with a highly skilled and adaptable workforce, thus contributing to economic growth, diversification, and industrial sustainability.
- Supporting Vocational Education and Training: Provides relevant and accessible training to individuals and organizations to improve their employability and performance in the labor market.
- Enhancing Skills in Key Sectors: Expands training programs to critical sectors directly impacting Nigeria's industrialization, such as manufacturing, construction, information technology, and agriculture.
- Facilitating Research and Development: Promotes research and development activities within Nigeria's industries to foster innovation and productivity.

=== Key programs and services ===
- Students Industrial Work Experience Scheme (SIWES): A program designed to prepare and expose students of universities, polytechnics, and colleges of education to practical work experience in their course of study.
- Vocational and Apprenticeship Training: Offers hands-on training in various trades, equipping individuals with practical skills for self-employment or employment in the industrial sector.
- Curriculum Design and Development: Develops and updates training curricula to align with industry standards and technological advancements.
- Direct Training: Provides specialized training programs tailored to the specific needs of industries and organizations.
- Research and Development: Conducts research to identify skills gaps and develop training programs that address the economy's needs.
- Technical and Vocational Skills Development: Focuses on enhancing technical skills in various sectors, including manufacturing, construction, and information technology.
- Micro, Small, and Medium Enterprises (MSME) Development: Supports the growth of MSMEs through training and capacity-building programs.

== Funding ==
The ITF is primarily funded through the contribution of organizations in Nigeria, particularly those within the private and public sectors. According to the Industrial Training Fund Act, all employers with five or more employees must contribute a specified percentage of their annual payroll to the fund. In addition to the mandatory contributions from employers, the ITF receives funding from government allocations and, occasionally, grants from international partners to enhance its capacity to train workers across various sectors. The funding model ensures that the ITF remains self-sustaining and can continue to support the development of skilled professionals.

== See also ==
- Federal Ministry of Education (Nigeria)
- House Committee on Finance (Nigeria)
- House Committee on Aids, Loans and Debt Management
- Universal Basic Education Commission
- National Assembly of Nigeria
