= 2015 Maiduguri suicide bombing =

2015 Maiduguri suicide bombing may refer to:

- January 2015 Maiduguri suicide bombing
- March 2015 Maiduguri suicide bombing
- September 2015 Borno State bombings
- December 2015 Madagali and Maiduguri bombings
