= House Committee on Health =

Legislative committee of the Nigerian National Assembly

- Abbreviation: HCHI
- Founder: National Assembly of Nigeria
- Type: Standing Committee
- Legal status: Active
- Purpose: Legislative oversight on health institutions and healthcare delivery
- Headquarters: National Assembly, Abuja, Nigeria
- Region served: Nigeria
- Official language: English
- Chairman: Amos Gwamna Magaji
- Main organ: Federal House of Representatives
- Parent organization: National Assembly of Nigeria
- Affiliations: Federal Ministry of Health (Nigeria), National Primary Health Care Development Agency (NPHCDA), Nigeria Centre for Disease Control (NCDC)
- Website: Official Website
- Remarks: Oversight on Nigeria's health institutions and related policy matters

The House Committee on Health was established by the Federal Government of Nigeria under the provisions of legislative decrees to oversee the nation's health institutions and ensure effective healthcare delivery. Tasked with legislative oversight, the committee evaluates the performance of health facilities, formulates policies to enhance healthcare services, and collaborates with stakeholders to strengthen Nigeria's healthcare system. Its mandate includes ensuring adequate funding for health institutions, monitoring infrastructure development, and promoting initiatives to improve public health outcomes nationwide.

== History ==
The House Committee on Health Institutions was formed as part of the legislative structure established under Section 62 of the 1999 Constitution of the Federal Republic of Nigeria. This section empowers the National Assembly to create committees to ensure effective legislative oversight and policy implementation in critical national development sectors, including healthcare.

Initially, the oversight of health-related matters was grouped under broader legislative committees. Still, as the healthcare sector expanded, a dedicated committee became necessary to address the growing complexity of managing health institutions. Over the years, the committee has played a pivotal role in overseeing the development of Nigeria's healthcare infrastructure, addressing systemic inefficiencies, and fostering accountability in the administration of public health institutions.

Through regular oversight visits, consultations with stakeholders, and legislative interventions, the committee has helped improve funding mechanisms, modernize medical infrastructure, and promote policies that align Nigeria's healthcare system with international standards. Its work continues to evolve in response to emerging health challenges and technological advancements.

=== Mandate ===
The committee is tasked with providing legislative oversight for Nigeria's health institutions to ensure the efficient delivery of healthcare services nationwide. Its mandate includes:

- Policy Oversight: Monitoring the implementation of healthcare policies and ensuring compliance with national health objectives and legislative directives.
- Evaluation of Health Institutions: This includes conducting inspections and assessments of federal and state health institutions, including teaching hospitals, medical centers, and specialized health facilities.
- Legislative Initiatives: Drafting, reviewing, and recommending laws to improve the healthcare sector, enhance medical infrastructure, and address public health challenges.
- Funding and Resource Allocation: Ensuring adequate budgetary provisions for health institutions and monitoring the utilization of allocated funds.
- Stakeholder Engagement: To promote sustainable healthcare development, collaborate with agencies such as the Federal Ministry of Health, the National Primary Health Care Development Agency (NPHCDA), and the Nigeria Centre for Disease Control (NCDC).
- Response to Public Health Emergencies: Addressing emerging public health concerns, such as epidemics and pandemics, through legislative support and institutional oversight.

=== Leadership and structure ===
It operates under a structured leadership framework designed to ensure efficiency and accountability in fulfilling its mandate. The leadership positions within the committee include:

- Chairman: The chairman is responsible for directing the committee's activities, presiding over meetings, and ensuring the execution of its legislative and oversight functions. As of January 2025, the committee is chaired by Amos Gwamna Magaji, a member of the House of Representatives.
- Deputy Chairman: This position supports the chairman in managing the committee's responsibilities and provides leadership in the chairman's absence. The current deputy chairman's position is unoccupied as of 2024 in the 10th Nigeria National Assembly.
- Secretary: The secretary manages the committee's administrative operations, including correspondence, record-keeping, and committee meetings and reports coordination.
- Committee Members: The committee consists of representatives from various constituencies. Members participate in deliberations, propose initiatives, and contribute to oversight activities.

== See also ==
- Federal Ministry of Health (Nigeria)
- House Committee on Finance (Nigeria)
- House Committee on Aids, Loans and Debt Management
- Nigeria Centre for Disease Control
- National Assembly of Nigeria
