= National Agency for the Control of AIDS (Nigeria) =

Nigerian government agency responsible for HIV/AIDS control

- Official NACA logo
- Formation: 2000
- Founder: Nigerian Federal Government
- Type: Government agency
- Legal status: Active
- Purpose: To coordinate and control HIV/AIDS prevention, treatment, and care across Nigeria
- Headquarters: Abuja, Nigeria
- Region served: Nigeria
- Members: Government institutions, NGOs, health agencies
- Director general: Temitope Ilori
- Main organ: Board of directors
- Parent organization: Government of Nigeria
- Website: www.naca.gov.ng

The National Agency for the Control of AIDS (NACA), established in 2000, is Nigeria’s primary body responsible for coordinating the national response to HIV/AIDS. It works to reduce HIV-related morbidity and mortality through strategic planning, policy formulation, advocacy, research, and effective implementation of interventions across the country. The current Director-General of the agency is Temitope Ilori.

== History ==
The National Agency for the Control of AIDS (NACA) was established in February 2000 as the National Action Committee on AIDS (NACA) to coordinate Nigeria's response to the HIV/AIDS epidemic. In May 2007, it was transformed into an agency by an enabling act. NACA operates under the 1999 Constitution of Nigeria, which came into force on May 29, 1999.

Its purpose is to coordinate and control HIV/AIDS prevention, treatment, and care across Nigeria. NACA's mandates include planning and coordinating activities of various sectors in the National Response Strategic Framework, facilitating engagement of all tiers of government and sectors on HIV/AIDS issues, advocating for the mainstreaming of HIV/AIDS interventions into all societal sectors, formulating policies and guidelines on HIV/AIDS, and supporting HIV/AIDS research in the country.

== Jurisdiction ==
NACA's jurisdiction encompasses the entire country, overseeing HIV/AIDS prevention, treatment, and care initiatives across all states and regions. Its mandates include planning and coordinating activities of various sectors in the National Response Strategic Framework, facilitating engagement of all tiers of government and sectors on HIV/AIDS issues, advocating for the mainstreaming of HIV/AIDS interventions into all societal sectors, formulating policies and guidelines on HIV/AIDS, and supporting HIV/AIDS research in the country.

== Affiliations ==
The agency collaborates with several local and international bodies in its efforts to combat HIV/AIDS in Nigeria. These include the World Health Organization (WHO), Joint United Nations Programme on HIV/AIDS (UNAIDS), National Health Insurance Scheme (NHIS), and Nigerian Ministry of Health. Additionally, NACA works with NGOs, civil society organizations, and global health funding agencies to implement HIV/AIDS programs and policies across the country.

== Locations ==
- Abuja Office: No 3, Ziguinchor Street, off IBB Way, behind Abuja Electricity Distribution Company (AEDC), Wuse Zone 4, Abuja
- Lagos Office: No 8B Obanta Avenue, off Ajao Road, Ikeja, Lagos
- Kano Office: Amana City, opposite Immigration Office (passport office) Zaria Road, Kano
- Gombe Office: Ajuji Waziri Street after Federal Secretariat, Federal Low Cost, Gombe
- Umuahia Office: Adelabu Housing Estate, Umuahia, Abia
- Uyo Office: No 65 Obio Imo street, Uyo
- Lafia Office: NACA Zonal Office, opposite State Hospital Doctors Quarters, old GRA, Lafia

== See also ==
- Federal Ministry of Health and Social Welfare
- World Health Organization
- Federal Government of Nigeria
- House Committee on Health (Nigeria)
