= September 2015 Borno State bombings =

Terrorist incident in Maiduguri and Monguno, Nigeria

- Part of the Boko Haram insurgency
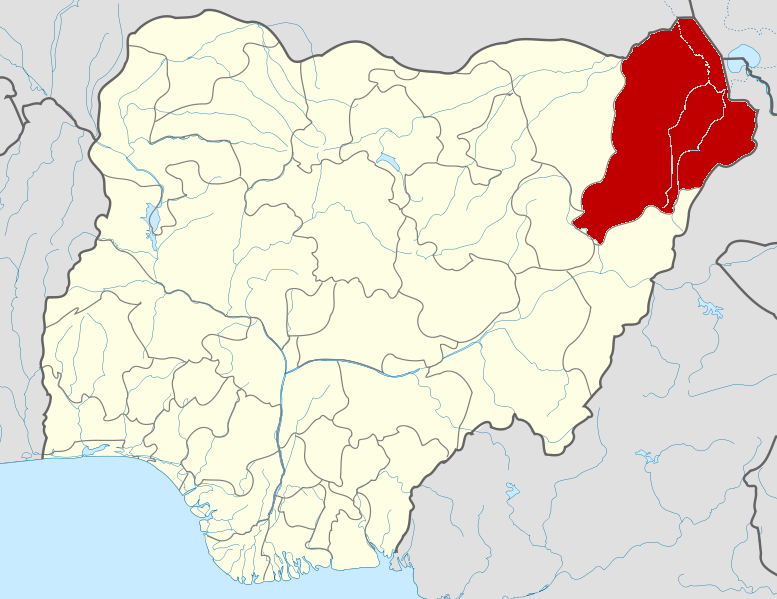
- Location of Borno State in Nigeria
- Location: Maiduguri and Monguno, Borno State, Nigeria
- Date: 20 September 2015; ~7:30–9:30 p.m. (UTC+01:00)
- Attack type: Suicide attack, bombing
- Weapon: Improvised explosive devices
- Deaths: 145+
- Injuries: 97+ (police report); 150+ (local report)
- Perpetrator: Boko Haram (suspected)

On the evening of 20 September 2015, a series of bombings took place in Maiduguri and Monguno, Nigeria, killing at least 145 people and injuring at least 97 others. The majority of casualties occurred in Maiduguri where four explosions killed at least 117 people.

== Background ==
The bombings took place after more than a month without incident in Maiduguri from the Islamic extremist group Boko Haram. An offensive by the Nigerian military in August, driving Boko Haram out of their bases in the region, resulted in a substantial drop in attacks. Earlier on September 20, Boko Haram leader Abubakar Shekau released a video refuting claims by the Nigerian military that Boko Haram had been defeated. No group has claimed responsibility for the attacks, although Boko Haram is suspected. Nigerian military spokesman Sani Usman stated that the event showed the "high level of desperation" of Boko Haram. Abba Mohammed Bashir Shuwa, aide to Borno State Governor Kashim Shettima, stated that the insurgents took advantage of crowds gathering ahead of the Muslim holiday Eid al-Adha.

== Maiduguri bombings ==
Around 7:30 p.m. local time (18:30 UTC) on September 20, a series of four explosions were set off across Maiduguri, the capital and largest city in Borno State in northeastern Nigeria, within the span of 20 minutes, killing at least 54 people. These were the largest attacks in the city since 7 March 2015, when a series of suicide bombings linked to Boko Haram killed 58 people.

A suicide bomber set off improvised explosive devices (IED) at a mosque within Ajilari, killing at least 43 people. Two explosions took place at a market in the city after insurgents tossed IEDs into a viewing center, killing at least 11 and as many as 15 people. The fourth bombing took place at a game center. Police spokesman Victor Isuku stated at least 97 were injured. A civilian defense group reported that at least 80 people were killed in the city and stated that the police cited a lower total due to families immediately burying relatives. Residents claimed the toll to be higher, including at least 85 deaths. On September 22, local hospitals reported that 117 people were known dead, with 72 at the University of Maiduguri Teaching Hospital and 45 at Borno State Specialist Hospital.

== Monguno bombings ==
Approximately two hours after the bombings in Maiduguri, two more bombs were set off at a checkpoint in the market town of Monguno about 135 km (84 mi) away, killing at least 28 people.

== See also ==
- 2015 Maiduguri suicide bombing (disambiguation)
