= House Committee on Banking and Currency (Nigeria) =

Legislative committee of the Nigerian National Assembly

- Abbreviation: HCBC
- Founder: National Assembly of Nigeria
- Type: Standing Committee
- Legal status: Active
- Purpose: Legislative oversight on banking policies, currency management, and financial stability
- Headquarters: National Assembly, Abuja, Nigeria
- Region served: Nigeria
- Official language: English
- Chairman: Hon. Mohammed Bello El-Rufai
- Main organ: Federal House of Representatives
- Parent organization: National Assembly of Nigeria
- Affiliations: Central Bank of Nigeria, Federal Ministry of Finance (Nigeria)
- Website: www.nass.gov.ng
- Remarks: Oversees Nigeria's banking system, currency management, and monetary policy

The House Committee on Banking and Currency is a standing committee in the Nigerian House of Representatives that oversees the nation's banking sector, currency policies, and financial institutions. Chaired by Hon. Mohammed Bello El-Rufai, the committee collaborates closely with the Central Bank of Nigeria (CBN), the Federal Ministry of Finance, and other regulatory agencies to ensure financial stability and promote economic growth. Through legislative oversight, public hearings, and policy reviews, the committee addresses excessive banking charges and currency management issues while fostering accountability and confidence in Nigeria's financial system.

== Jurisdiction ==
The House Committee on Banking and Currency of Nigeria's House of Representatives holds jurisdiction over several key areas within the nation's financial sector. Its primary responsibilities include:

- Banks and Banking: Overseeing the operations, regulations, and policies related to banking institutions, including deposit insurance and monetary policy.
- Currency Management: Supervising national currency issuance, circulation, and regulation matters.
- Financial Institutions: Regulating non-banking financial entities to ensure compliance with national financial laws and policies.
- Monetary Policy Oversight: Monitoring and evaluating the implementation of monetary policies by the Central Bank of Nigeria (CBN) to ensure alignment with national economic objectives.
- Legislative Framework: Developing and amending laws that govern the financial sector to promote stability, growth, and consumer protection.

== History ==
The committee was established to oversee the nation's banking sector, currency regulation, and financial policies. Its creation is rooted in the Constitution of the Federal Republic of Nigeria, which empowers the National Assembly to form committees necessary for the effective execution of its legislative responsibilities. Specifically, Section 62(1) of the Constitution states:

"The Senate or the House of Representatives may appoint a committee of its members for such special or general purposes as in its opinion would be better regulated and managed using such a committee."

The National Assembly established the committee's jurisdiction to address the growing complexity of Nigeria's financial system and provide specialized legislative oversight. It plays a major role in shaping financial legislation and ensuring the stability and accountability of Nigeria's financial institutions. Over the years, the committee has contributed to formulating and amending key laws, such as the Banks and Other Financial Institutions Act (BOFIA), which governs banking operations in Nigeria.

Its functions align with constitutional provisions and the broader mandate of the National Assembly to safeguard the nation's economic framework. Under successive legislative sessions, the committee has held public hearings, engaged with financial regulators like the Central Bank of Nigeria (CBN), and addressed critical issues affecting the financial sector, such as excessive bank charges and currency management.

== See also ==
- Federal Ministry of Finance (Nigeria)
- House Committee on Finance (Nigeria)
- House Committee on Aids, Loans and Debt Management
- Central Bank of Nigeria
- National Assembly of Nigeria
