= Ramat Polytechnic =

State polytechnic in Maiduguri, Borno State, Nigeria

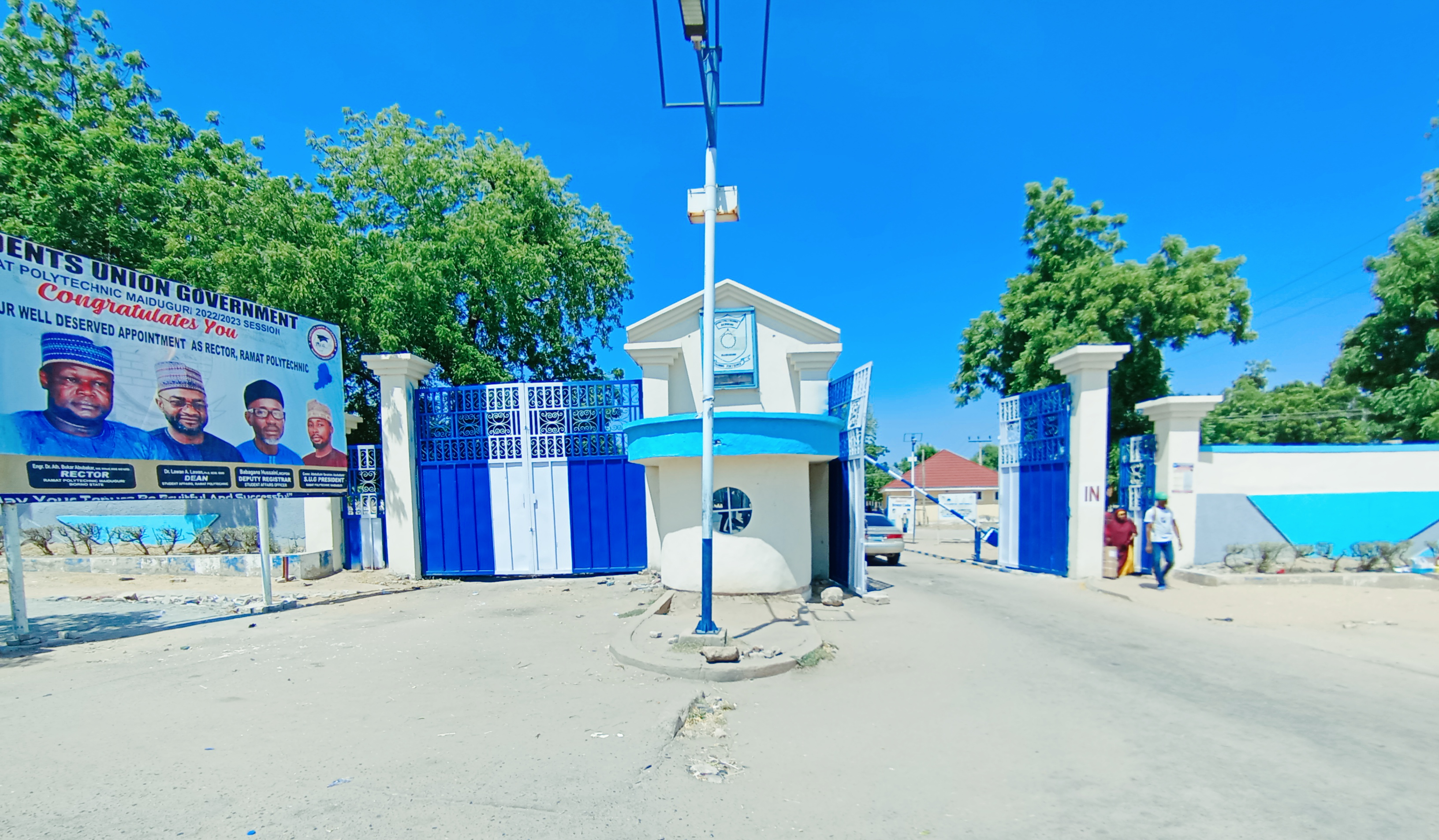
- Type: Public polytechnic
- Established: January 1973
- Accreditation: National Board for Technical Education (NBTE)
- Affiliations: National Board for Technical Education (NBTE), National Commission for Colleges of Education (NCCE)
- Rector: Engr. Dr. Bukar Abubakar
- Location: Maiduguri, Borno State, Nigeria; 11.838°N 13.133°E
- Campus: Urban
- Website: ramatpoly.edu.ng

Ramat Polytechnic is a state tertiary institution of learning in Maiduguri, Borno State, Nigeria. It was established by the government of the defunct North-Eastern State in January 1973 as Government Technical College.

== Background ==
The College was renamed and upgraded to Ramat College of Technology in April 1978 by the Government of Borno State in honour of the then Head of State, late General Murtala Ramat Muhammad. Ramat college received its polytechnic status in August 1979 in conformity with the Federal Government initiative to rename all Colleges of Technology in the country to Polytechnic. Ramat Polytechnic is a federal government approved tertiary institution and it was recognized by the National Board for Technical Education (NBTE) and the National Commission for Colleges of Education (NCCE).

== Library ==
The Polytechnic library is restricted to registered students, staff, and council members of the Polytechnic. Non-members have to apply in written through the Librarian to obtain permission to use the library for a limited period. The Polytechnic also provide E-library services to their students, staff and all the registered members of the Polytechnic

== Courses ==
The College has 30 Academic Departments which are structured under 5 academic schools, which are:

- School of Agricultural and Applied Sciences
- School of Engineering and Bio-Environmental Technology
- School of Environmental Studies
- School of Management Studies
- School of Vocational and Technical Education.

== Awards ==
This institution was the first Polytechnic in the country chosen to be a center of excellence in the establishment of Post-Harvest Storage and Handling Technology. The Polytechnic won various awards such as Best Polytechnic Technology Exposition, Industrial Training Fund (ITF) as 2nd Best Performance Scheme (SIWES) activities, and award of Excellence in recognition of training in the building profession by Nigeria Institution of Builders, The students also won gold medals in some events, silver and Bronze in different events in all Nigeria Polytechnic Game(NIPOGA)

== Location ==
The Polytechnic lies along Maiduguri-Jos Road and it is situated in a well secured environment around the police college Maiduguri, Metro Police Barrack Government College Maiduguri, Women Teacher's College, and Board of Internal Revenue

== Gallery ==
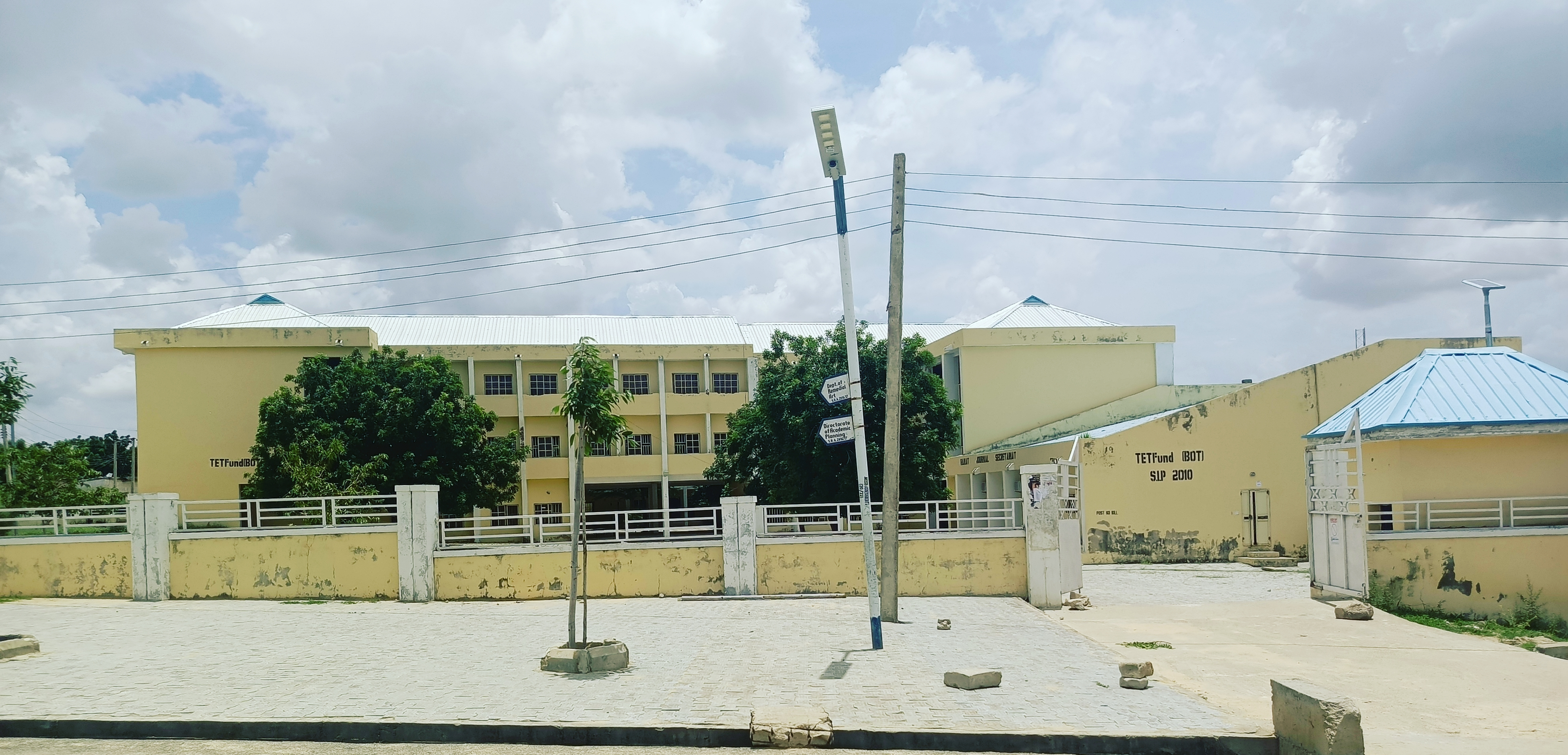
Ramat polytechnic School of Management Comple.

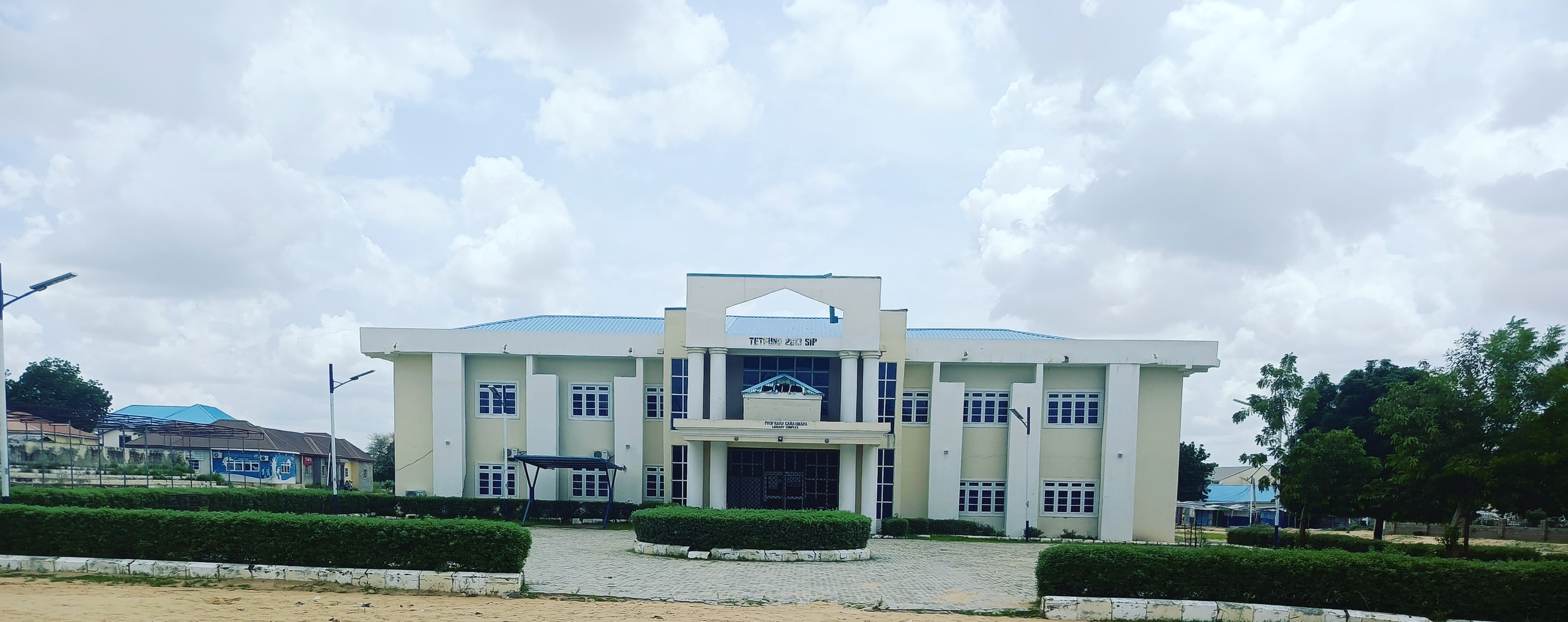
Ramat Polytechnic Library complex Maiduguri.

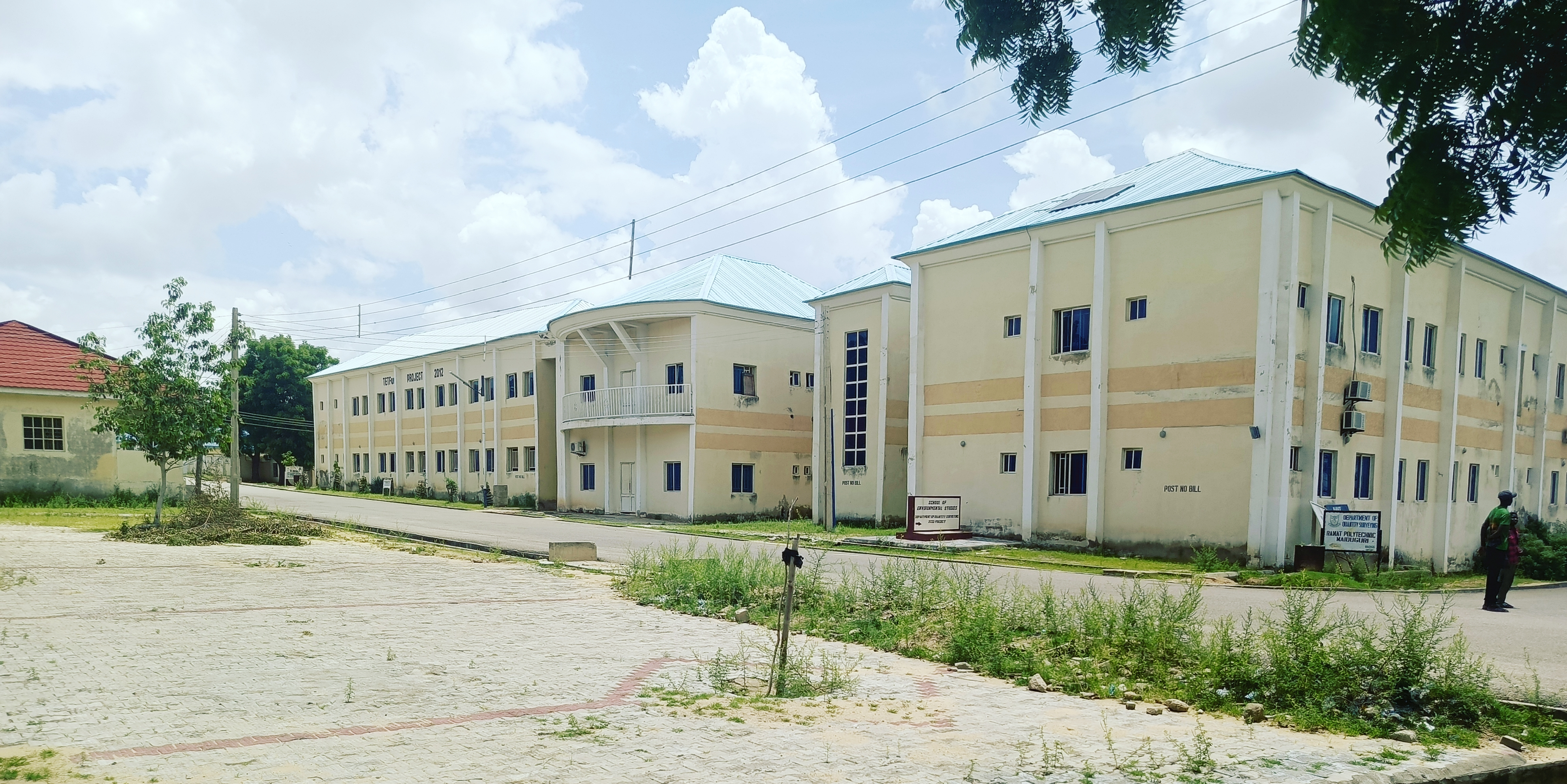
Environmental_complex

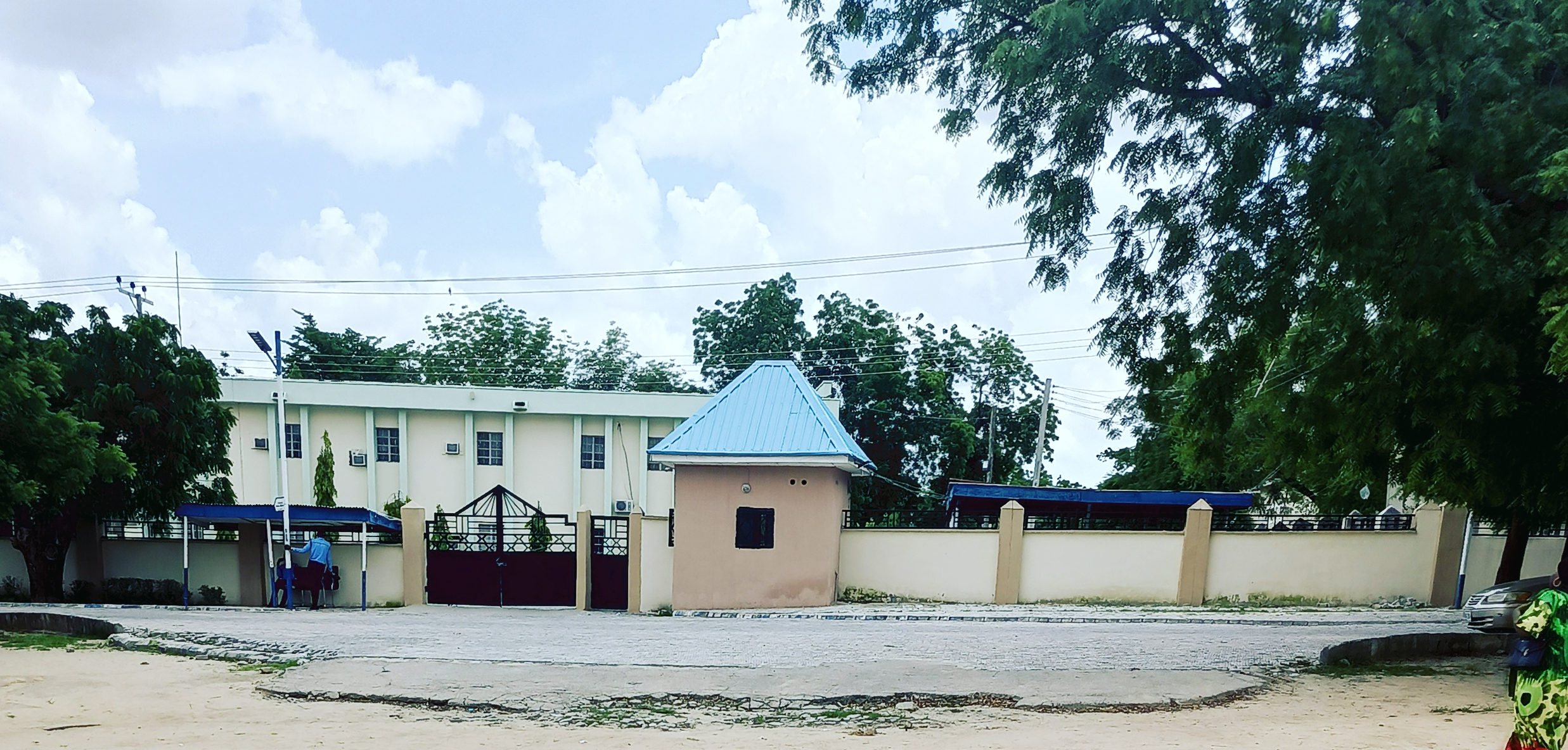
Reactor_office

Engineering_Complex

== See also ==
List of Polytechnics in Nigeria
