= Ka'amuna Khadi =

Nigerian politician and banking executive

Ka'amuna Ibrahim Khadi

Executive Director, Risk Management and Strategy, Bank of Agriculture
- Incumbent
- Assumed office December 2025

Member of the House of Representatives for Jere Federal Constituency
- In office 2011–2015
- Preceded by: Abba Dawud Lawan

Personal details
- Born: Borno State, Nigeria
- Occupation: Politician, banking executive

Ka'amuna Ibrahim Khadi is a Nigerian politician and banking executive from Borno State. She represented Jere Federal Constituency in the House of Representatives from 2011 to 2015, and in December 2025 was appointed Executive Director for Risk Management and Strategy at the Bank of Agriculture.

== Political career ==
Khadi was elected to the House of Representatives in the 2011 general election, representing Jere Federal Constituency of Borno State in the 7th National Assembly. She served a single term, which ended in 2015.

== Bank of Agriculture ==
In December 2025, President Bola Tinubu constituted new boards for the Bank of Agriculture, the National Agricultural Development Fund and the Universal Basic Education Commission. Khadi was named Executive Director for Risk Management and Strategy at the Bank of Agriculture, one of three executive directors appointed alongside Fatima Garba and Hakeem Oluwatosin Salami, under chairman Muhammad Babangida and managing director Ayodeji Sotinrin.

The board was inaugurated in July 2026 by the Minister of Agriculture and Food Security, Abubakar Kyari, who directed its members to prioritise credit access for farmers and agribusinesses and to improve the bank's loan recovery.
