= Lanre Okunlola =

Nigerian politician and philanthropist

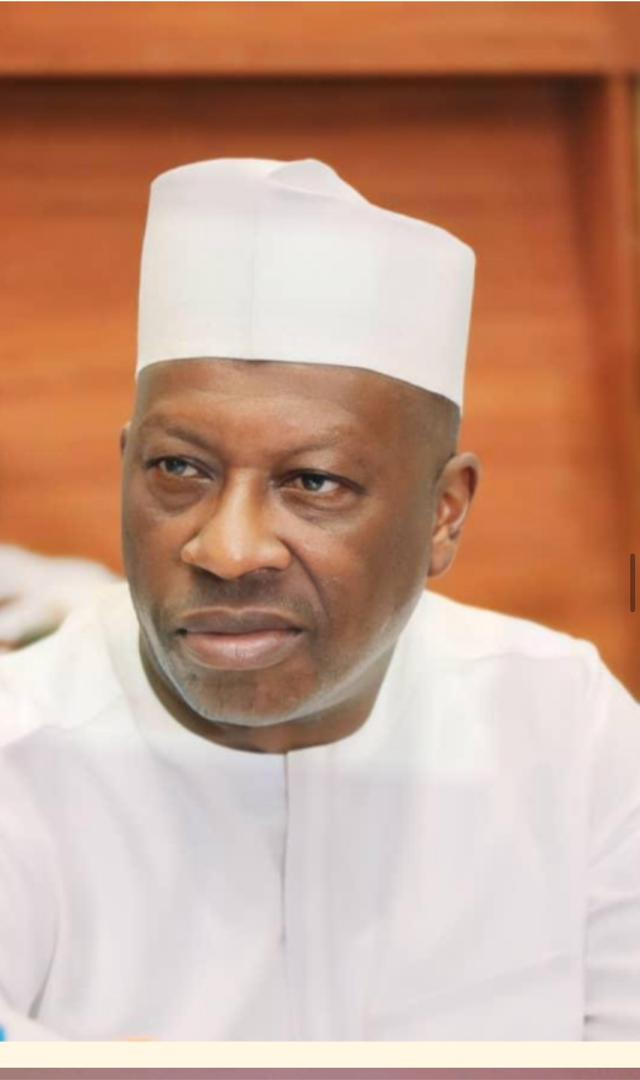

Member House of Representatives from Surulere II Federal Constituency of Lagos State
- Incumbent
- Assumed office June 2023

Deputy Chairman, House Committee on Aids, Loans and Debt Management
- Incumbent
- Assumed office June 2023

Personal details
- Born: January 26, 1966 (age 60)
- Party: All Progressives Congress (APC)
- Education: Ahmadu Bello University
- Occupation: Politician
- Profession: Architect

Lanre Okunlola (born January 26, 1966) is a Nigerian politician, architect, and community leader. He serves as a member of the House of Representatives in the 10th National Assembly, representing the Surulere II Federal Constituency of Lagos State since June 2023. He is a member of the All Progressives Congress (APC) and the Deputy Chairman of the House Committee on Aid, Loans, and Debt Management. Okunlola is known for his legislative contributions, having sponsored over 12 bills and introduced several motions in the House of Representatives.

== Early life and education ==
Lanre Okunlola was born on January 26, 1966, in Lagos, Nigeria, to Mr. and Mrs. Okunola. He attended Surulere Baptist School and Methodist Boys High School for his primary and secondary education, respectively.

In 1988, Okunlola earned a Bachelor of Science in architecture from Ahmadu Bello University (ABU), Zaria. He later completed his master's in architecture at ABU in 1990, solidifying his academic foundation in architecture and design.

== Political career ==
Okunlola transitioned into politics as a member of the All Progressives Congress (APC). In the 2023 general elections, he was elected to represent Surulere II Federal Constituency in the House of Representatives, securing 27,725 votes. Since joining the National Assembly, he has focused on legislative initiatives promoting national development, sponsoring key bills such as the Nigeria Social Investment Regulation Agency Bill, Nigeria Climate Change Fund Bill, National Institute for Creative and Performing Arts Bill, and Federal Medical Centre, Orile, Lagos Bill.

Okunlola through his foundation has been involved in community development initiatives, providing free Joint Admissions and Matriculation Board (JAMB) forms to underprivileged students and fostering youth engagement by founding a local football team to promote physical activity and teamwork.

== Personal life ==
Okunlola is married with children.
