= Maiduguri =

Capital city of Borno State, Nigeria

Maiduguri Yerwa
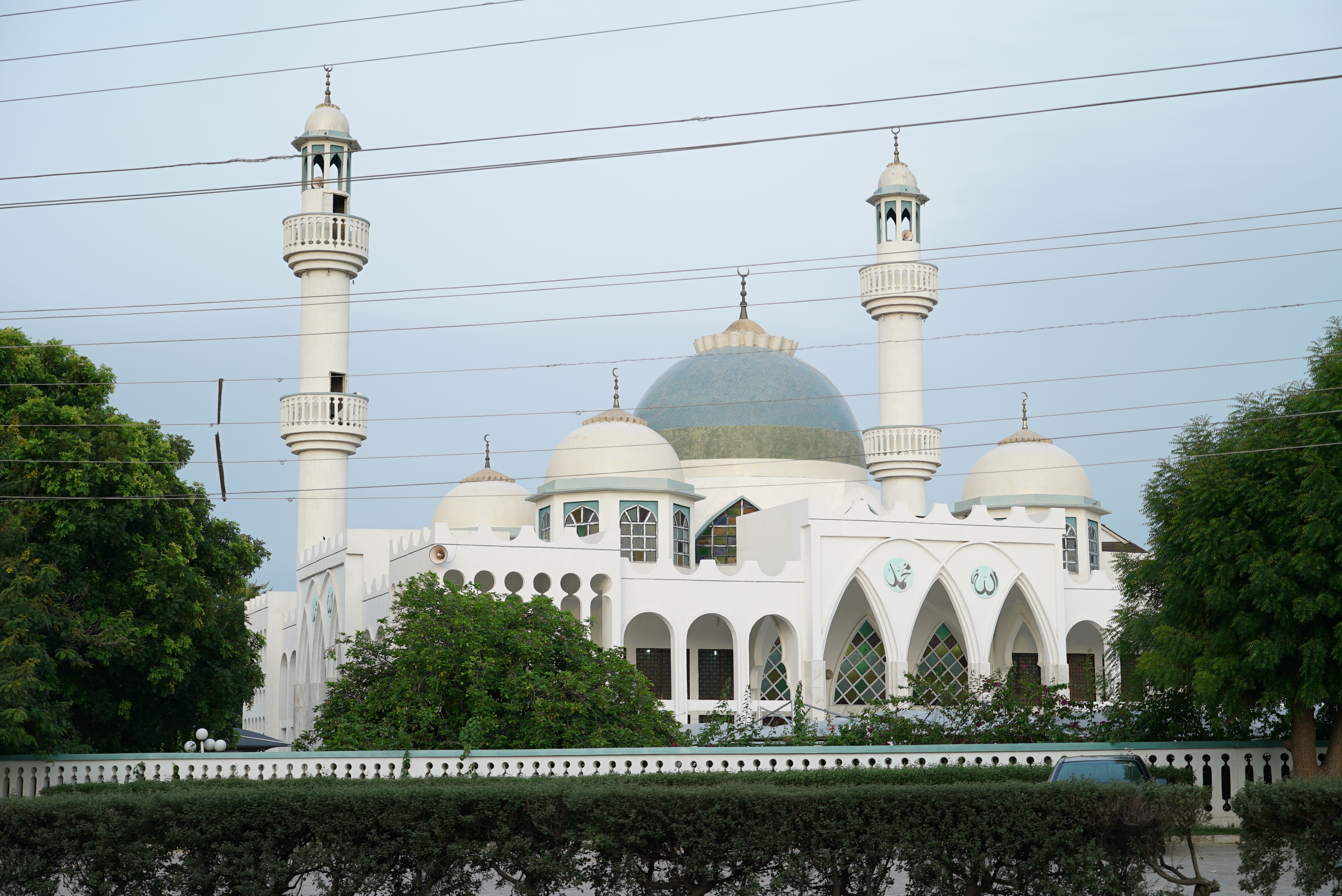
- The Indimi Mosque situated in Maiduguri
- Interactive map of Maiduguri
- Location in Nigeria
- Coordinates: 11°50′14″N 13°09′15″E
- Country: Nigeria
- State: Borno

Area
  - Total: 105.5 km^{2} (40.7 sq mi)
- Elevation: 320 m (1,050 ft)

Population (2022 projection)
  - Total: 791,200
  - Density: 7,500/km^{2} (19,420/sq mi)

GDP (PPP, 2015 int. Dollar)
  - Year: 2023
  - Total: $6 billion
  - Per capita: $7,100
- Climate: BSh

Maiduguri (/maɪˈduːɡʊri/ my-DOO-guurr-ee) is the capital and the largest city of Borno State in north-eastern Nigeria, on the continent of Africa. The city sits along the seasonal Ngadda River which disappears into the Firki swamps in the areas around Lake Chad. Maiduguri was founded in 1907 as a military outpost by the British Empire during the colonial period. As of 2022, Maiduguri is estimated to have a population of approximately two million people, in the metropolitan area.

== History ==
=== Early period ===
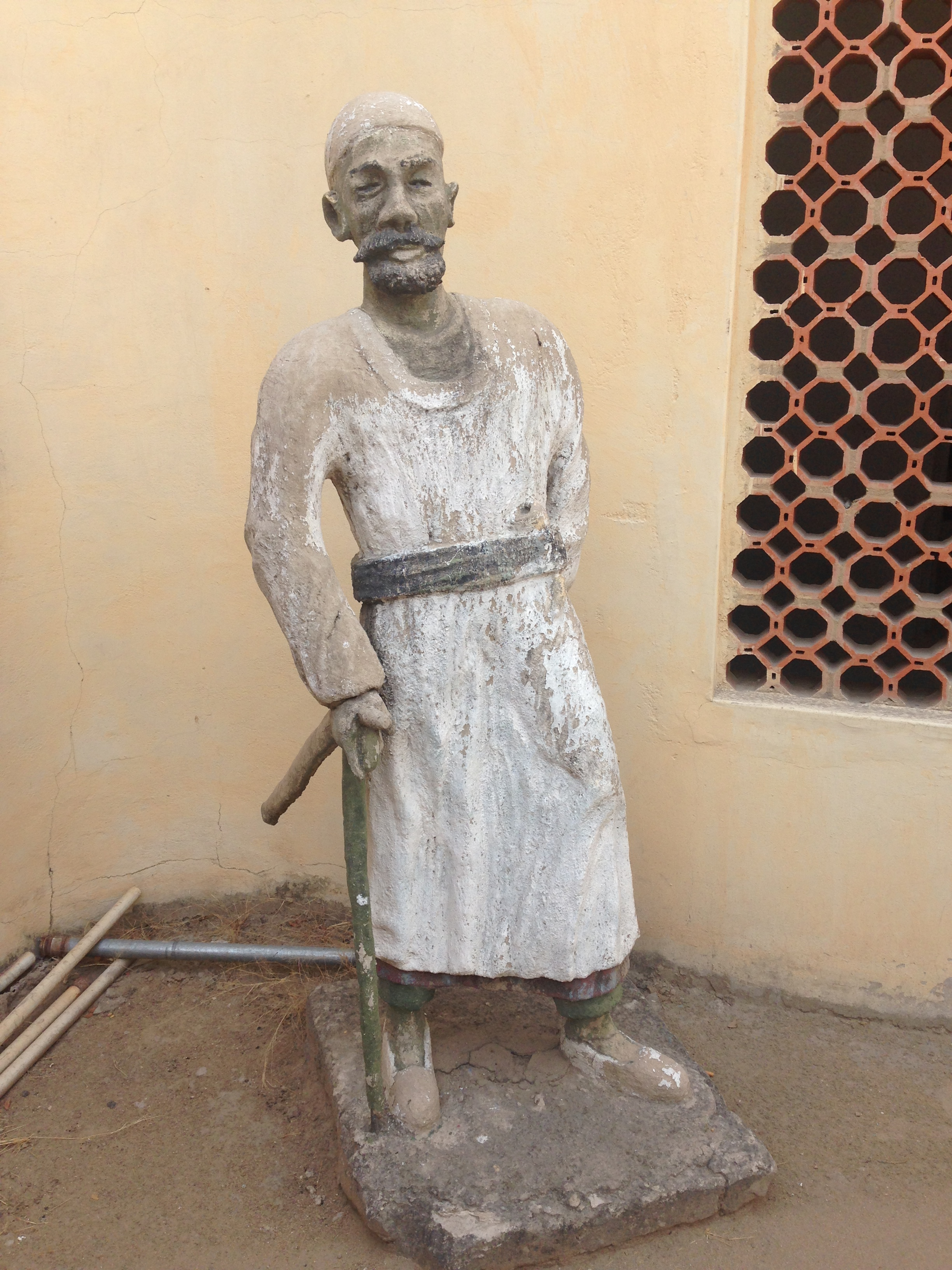
Statue of Rabih az-Zubayr at Maiduguri National Museum

The region was home to the Kanem–Bornu Empire for centuries. Maiduguri actually consists of two cities: Yerwa to the West and Old Maiduguri to the east. Yerwa was founded in 1907 by Abubakar Garbai of Borno as the capital of the Bornu Kingdom. The location before that had been a small village known as Kalwa. This involved the transfer of the capital of the Kanuri people from Kukawa.

Old Maiduguri was selected by the British as their military headquarters in 1908, replacing Mafoni. The same year it became the location for the British Resident Commissioner over British Bornu. In 1957, Yerwa became the designated name for the urban centre while 'Maiduguri' was officially applied as the name of the surrounding rural area. In 1964 the railway was extended here which led to its rise as a major commercial center in the region.

The city was once known as a "hub of Islamic scholarship in West Africa that ... [taught] tolerance and hospitality like its welcoming neem trees."

Maiduguri is one of the fifteen Local Government Areas (LGAs) that constitute the Borno Emirate, a traditional state located in Borno State, Nigeria.

=== Islamist violence ===
Since the mid-1960s, Maiduguri has witnessed outbreaks of large inter-religious riots with members of religious sects leading intercommunal violence in 1982 and 2001.

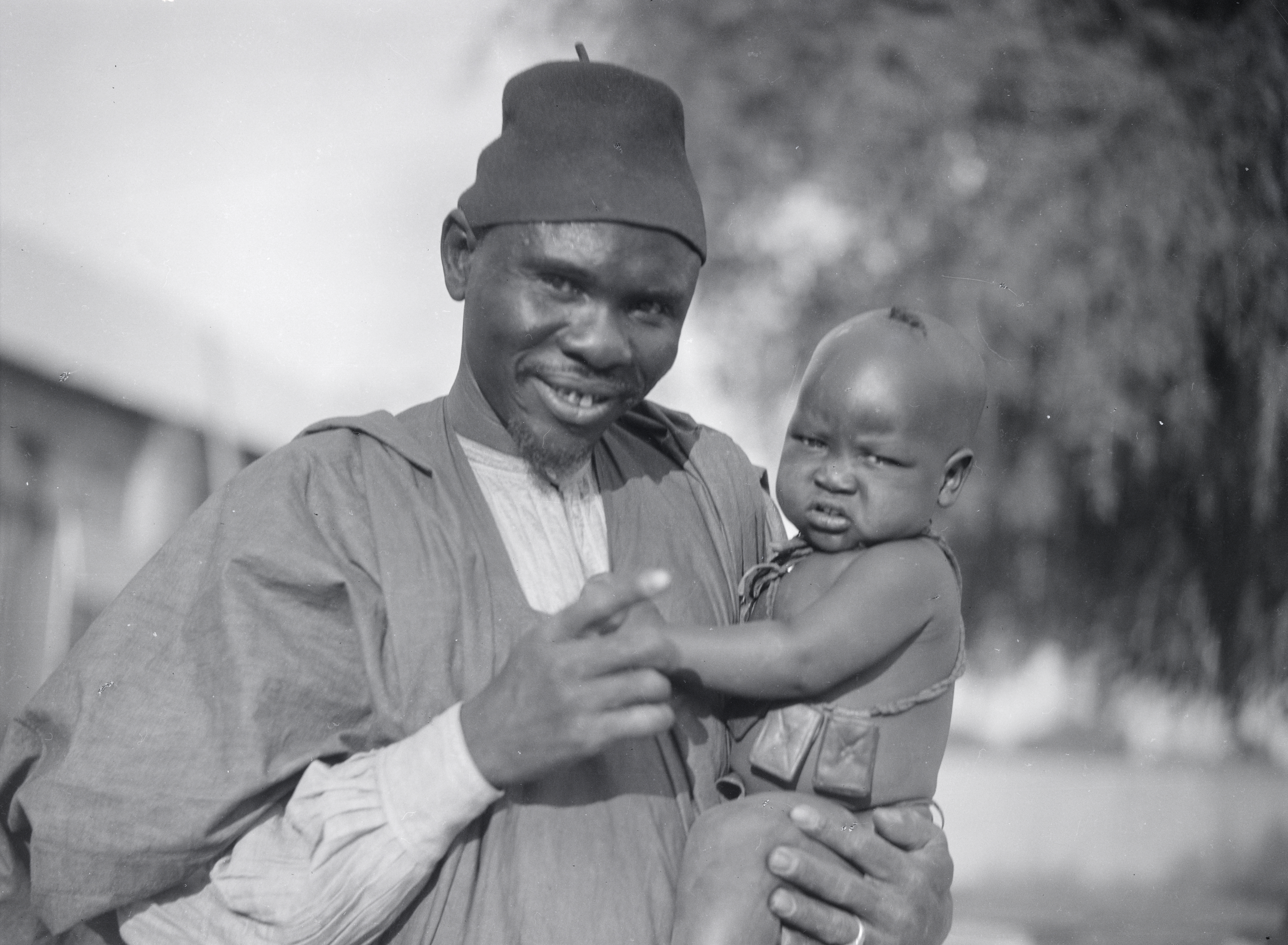
A photograph of a man and child in Maiduguri during 1930-31, from the collection of ETH Library in Switzerland. The town had become a centre for commerce and colonial administration by the early 20th century.

On 18 February 2006, riots related to the Muhammad cartoons published by the Danish newspaper Jyllands-Posten left at least 15 people dead, and resulted in the destruction of approximately 12 churches. Soldiers and police quelled the riots, and the government temporarily imposed a curfew.

In 2002, Muslim cleric Mohammed Yusuf founded the Islamist jihadist group Boko Haram in Maiduguri, establishing a mosque and a madrasa that attracted children from poor Muslim families from both Nigeria and neighboring countries.

==== Boko Haram attacks ====
The city is the heart of the Boko Haram insurgency and is the city which is most often attacked by the group. In late July 2009, Maiduguri was the worst-hit location of major religious violence in northern Nigeria committed by Boko Haram, which left over 700 people dead.

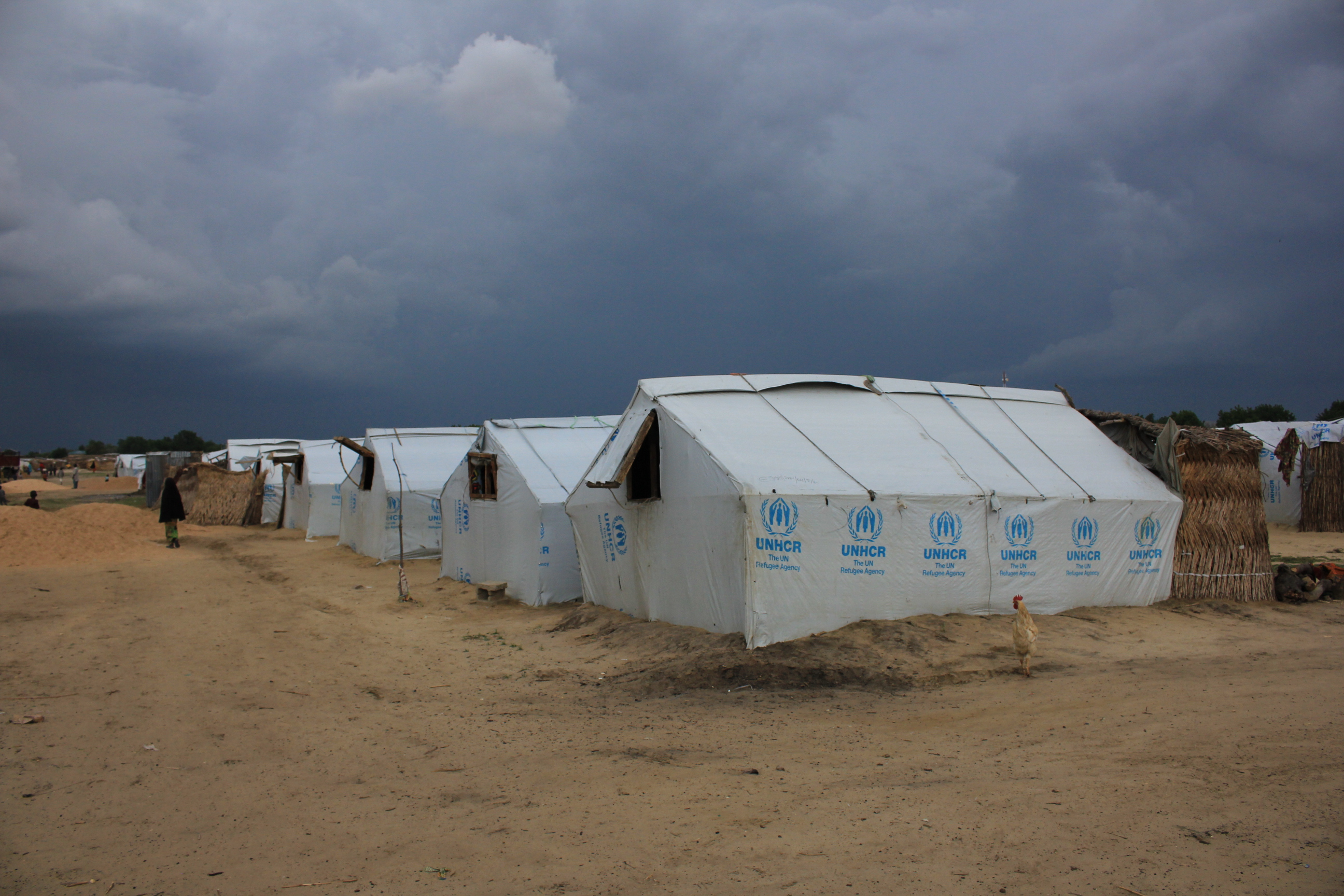
An internally displaced persons camp near the city sheltering people who are escaping harassment from Boko Haram

On 14 May 2013, President Goodluck Jonathan declared a state of emergency in northeast Nigeria, including Borno State, due to the militant activity of Boko Haram. The entire city was under overnight curfew, and trucks were only restricted to dusk-dawn from entering to protect civilian lives in the city. Twelve areas of the city that are known to be strongholds of Boko Haram are under permanent curfew. On 18 June 2013, Boko Haram militants attacked a school as students were taking an exam; nine students were killed.

In 2014, Boko Haram bombed Maiduguri in January, in July and in November.

On 10 January 2015, a bomb attack was executed at the Monday Market in Maiduguri, killing 19 people. In the early hours of 25 January, Boko Haram launched a major assault on the city. On 26 January, CNN reported that the attack on Maiduguri by "hundreds of gunmen" had been repelled, but the nearby town of Monguno was captured by Boko Haram. The Nigerian Army claimed to have successfully repelled another attack on Maiduguri on 31 January 2015. On 17 February 2015, Monguno subsequently fell to the Nigerian military in a coordinated air and ground assault. On 7 March 2015, five suicide bomb blasts left 54 dead and 143 wounded. On 30 May 2015, Boko Haram launched another attack on the city, killing thirteen people. In March 2017 Boko Haram again bombed Maiduguri.

On 24 December 2025, a bomb explosion occurred in the Al-Adum Jumaat mosque near the Gamboru market during prayers which killed 5 people and injured 35. The police speculate a suicide attack. Borno State Governor Babagana Zulum condemned the attack stating that it is "utterly condemnable, barbaric and inhumane".

A 65 km long earthen berm around Maiduguri was constructed in order to provide protection against insurgents.

=== Giwa barracks ===
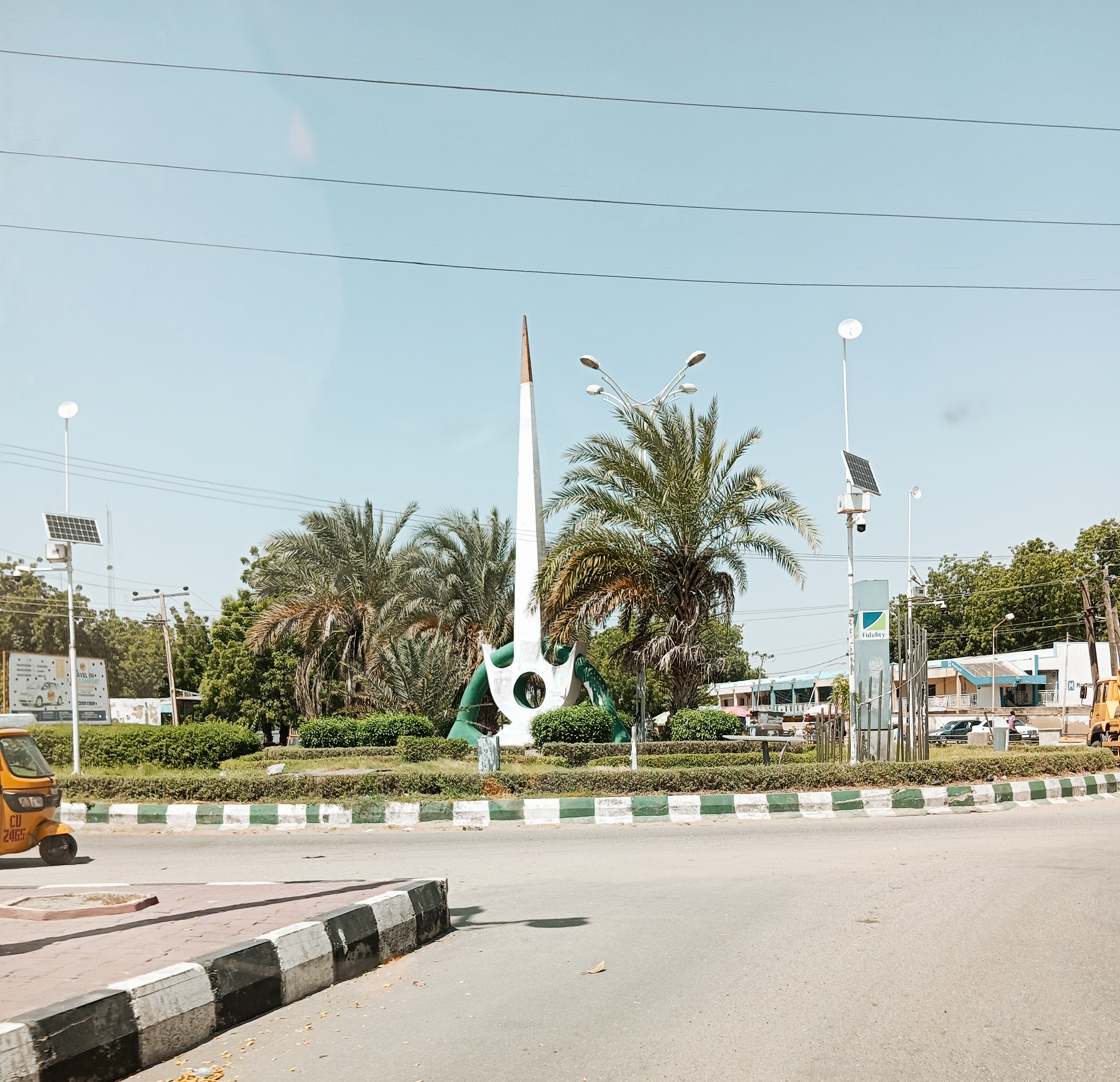
One of the roundabout in Maiduguri

The Giwa barracks and detention centre in Maiduguri has been subject to multiple attacks by Boko Haram. In 2014, reports suggested that 600 people were killed in an attack, though most were detainees killed by soldiers. It was attacked in January/February 2015, bombed in March 2015, and attacked again in May 2015.

In May 2016, Amnesty International released a report on the Giwa barracks detention centre, calling it a "place of death." The report alleges the facilities house about 1,200 people (including 120 children) and that many of these were detained arbitrarily. It further claims that 149 detainees had died in the first half of 2016, including 11 children. In 2019, Amnesty International (AI) and Concerned Nigerians (CN) called for investigation into alleged abuse of women and children in the facility.

Tramadol addiction has become a concern in the Maiduguri region, as Boko Haram fighters and local residents turn to the drug to cope with physical pain, personal loss, and the emotional consequences of violence.

== Climate ==
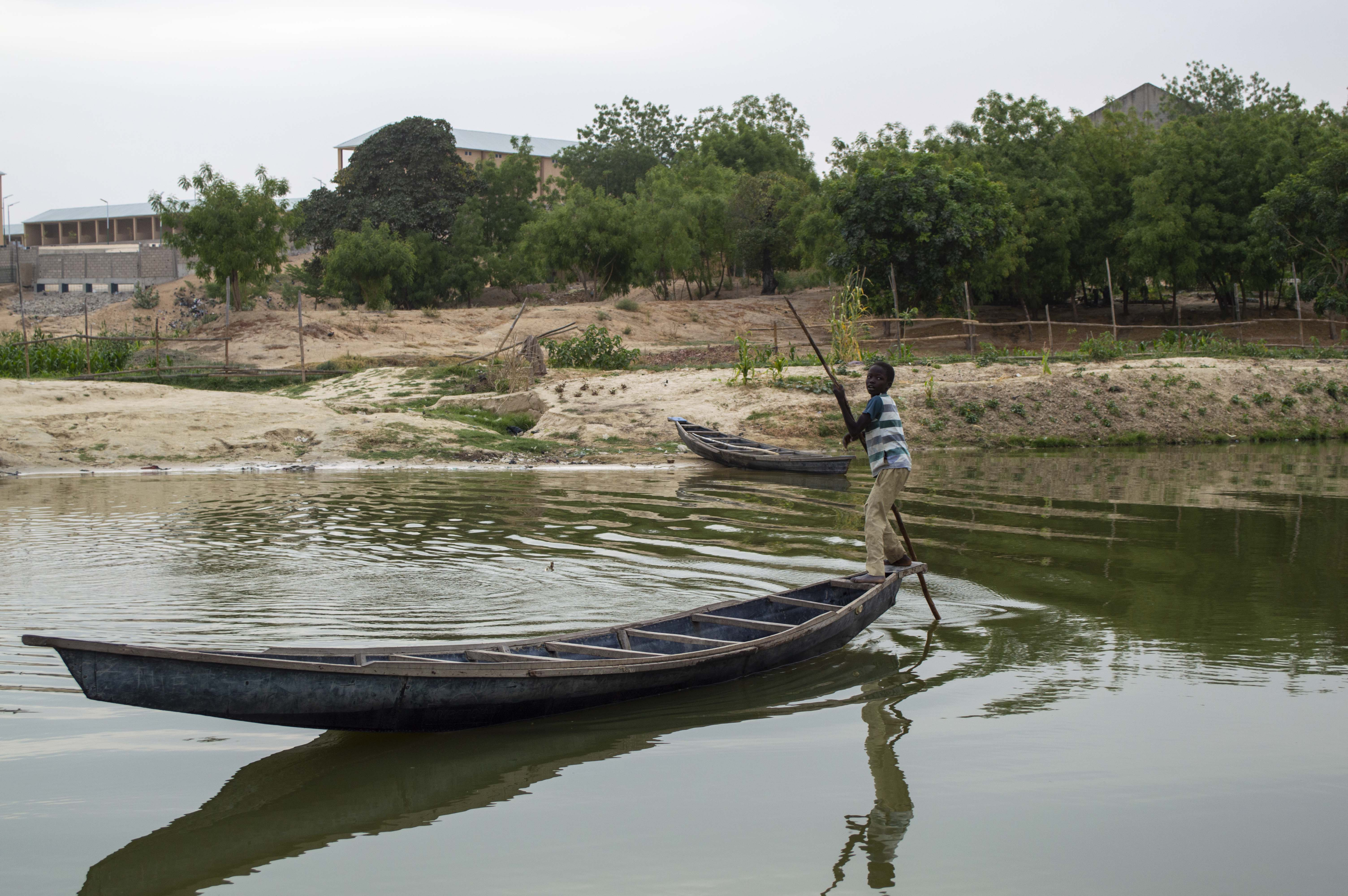
A boy navigating the nearby Ngadda River in a traditional canoe design.

Köppen–Geiger climate classification system classifies its climate as hot semi-arid (BSh).

The highest record temperature was 47 °C (116.6 °F) on 28 May 1983, while the lowest record temperature was 5 °C (41 °F) on 26 December 1979.

Tree planting was a priority of the city's colonial administration, and large trees along major roads give protection from intense sun.

=== Normal temperature in Maiduguri ===
The hot season goes on for 2.4 months, from 13 March to 26 May, with a typical everyday high temperature above 38.9 °C or 102 °F. The most blazing month of the year in Maiduguri is May, with a typical high of 39.4 °C or 103 °F and low of 26.1 °C or 79 °F.

The cool season goes on for 2.1 months, from 20 July to 23 September, with a typical everyday high temperature underneath 33.3 °C or 92 °F. The coldest month of the year in Maiduguri is January, with a typical low of 15 °C or 59 °F and high of 33.3 °C or 92 °F.

Climate data for Maiduguri (1991-2020)
Month	Jan	Feb	Mar	Apr	May	Jun	Jul	Aug	Sep	Oct	Nov	Dec	Year
Record high °C (°F)	40.5 (104.9)	43.0 (109.4)	44.5 (112.1)	46.0 (114.8)	47.0 (116.6)	42.7 (108.9)	43.0 (109.4)	37.0 (98.6)	39.0 (102.2)	42.4 (108.3)	42.2 (108.0)	39.1 (102.4)	47.0 (116.6)
Mean daily maximum °C (°F)	31.6 (88.9)	34.9 (94.8)	38.8 (101.8)	41.3 (106.3)	40.1 (104.2)	36.8 (98.2)	33.1 (91.6)	31.4 (88.5)	33.4 (92.1)	36.3 (97.3)	35.8 (96.4)	32.7 (90.9)	35.5 (95.9)
Daily mean °C (°F)	22.3 (72.1)	25.5 (77.9)	29.7 (85.5)	33.3 (91.9)	33.4 (92.1)	31.2 (88.2)	28.5 (83.3)	27.1 (80.8)	28.2 (82.8)	29.0 (84.2)	26.4 (79.5)	23.2 (73.8)	28.2 (82.8)
Mean daily minimum °C (°F)	13.0 (55.4)	16.1 (61.0)	20.6 (69.1)	25.3 (77.5)	26.6 (79.9)	25.6 (78.1)	23.8 (74.8)	22.9 (73.2)	23.1 (73.6)	21.8 (71.2)	16.9 (62.4)	13.7 (56.7)	20.8 (69.4)
Record low °C (°F)	4.0 (39.2)	8.0 (46.4)	10.0 (50.0)	12.0 (53.6)	17.0 (62.6)	18.7 (65.7)	16.1 (61.0)	19.0 (66.2)	19.0 (66.2)	13.0 (55.4)	10.0 (50.0)	5.0 (41.0)	4.0 (39.2)
Average precipitation mm (inches)	0.0 (0.0)	0.0 (0.0)	0.1 (0.00)	3.7 (0.15)	35.3 (1.39)	86.1 (3.39)	193.3 (7.61)	229.9 (9.05)	127.6 (5.02)	22.8 (0.90)	0.0 (0.0)	0.1 (0.00)	699.0 (27.52)
Average precipitation days (≥ 1.0 mm)	0.0	0.0	0.1	0.8	3.6	5.5	9.9	12.2	7.0	1.7	0.0	0.0	40.8
Average relative humidity (%)	19.1	14.7	13.0	22.4	37.3	50.4	63.4	74.8	71.5	51.4	27.6	22.9	39.0
Mean monthly sunshine hours	266.6	249.2	257.3	237.0	263.5	249.0	217.0	204.6	225.0	285.2	282.0	275.9	3,012.3
Mean daily sunshine hours	8.6	8.9	8.3	7.9	8.5	8.3	7.0	6.6	7.5	9.2	9.4	8.9	8.3
Source 1: NOAA (sun 1961-1990), Climate Charts (latitude: 11°51'N; longitude: 013°05'E; elevation: 354 m or 1,161 ft)
Source 2: Voodoo Skies for record temperatures

== Demographics ==
Maiduguri is estimated to have a population of 1,907,600, as of 2007. It grew in size by 15.1 km^{2} (5.8 sq mi) between 2002 and 2012.

Its residents are mostly Muslim including Kanuri, Hausa, Shuwa, Bura, Marghi, and Fulani ethnic groups. There is also a considerable Christian population and people from Southern states such as the Igbo, Ijaw, and Yoruba.

Maiduguri had 22 internally displaced persons camps in 2019, including Shagari camp with 48 households, and Cherubim & Seraphim camp with 65 households. The NYSC (National Youth Service) in Maiduguri housed 4,800 displaced people in 2016. Goni Kachallari had 340 families in 2016.

Languages spoken in the camps include Fulfulde, Gamargu, Hausa (8.4% native speakers), Kanuri (53.5% native speakers), Shuwa Arabic, and Marghi (15.6%). About a third of survey respondents had comprehension of a simple English audio sample; close to 100% had comprehension of audio messaging in either Hausa or Kanuri.

== Air pollution ==
As a result of chemical reactions involving moving vehicles and the release of gases that can cause inhalation into the deepest parts of the lung, Maiduguri is currently experiencing particulate dust, a harmful air pollutant.

== Transport ==
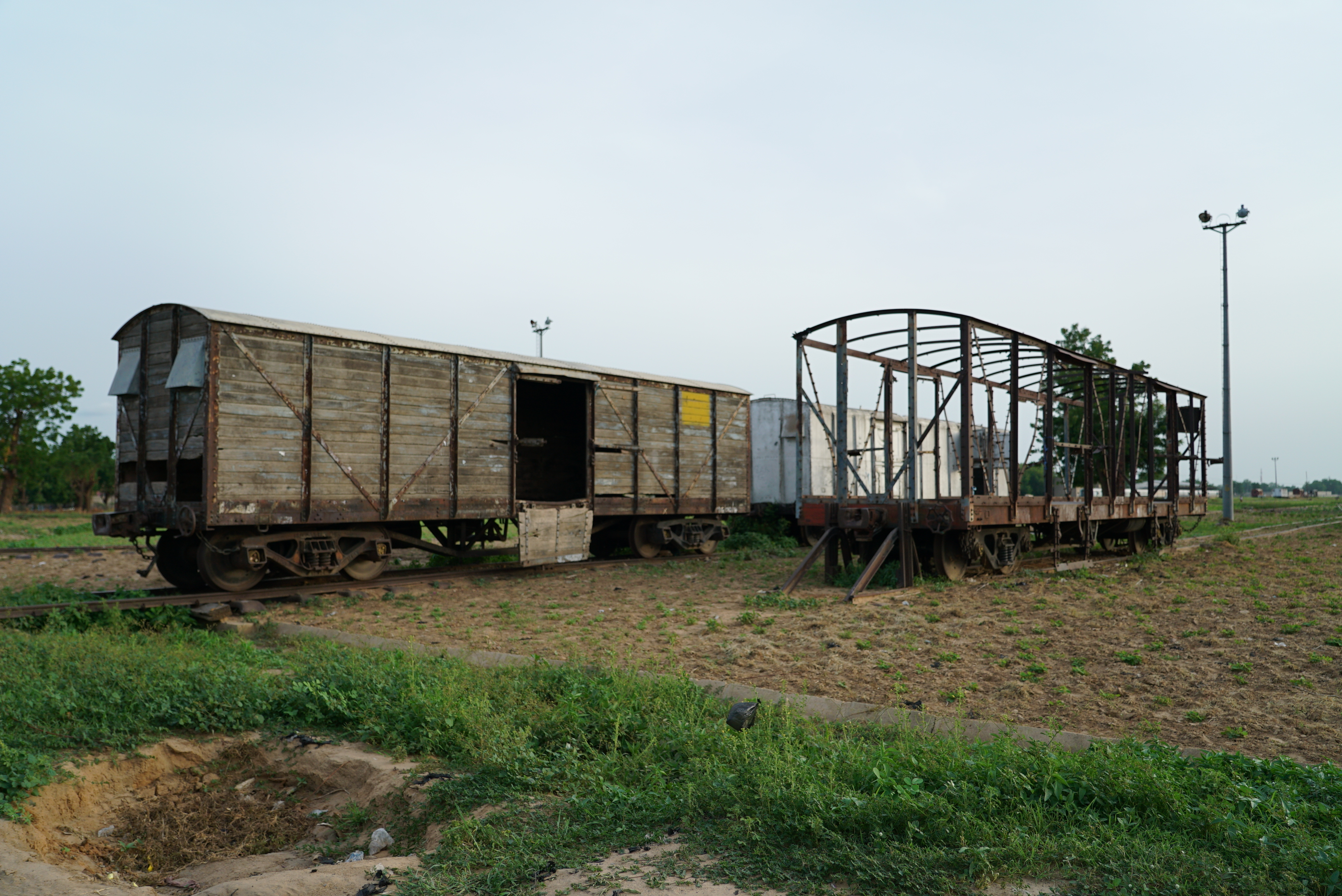
Old Rail Carriages at the Maiduguri rail station. The station is the end of line for connecting Maiduguri with other major cities.

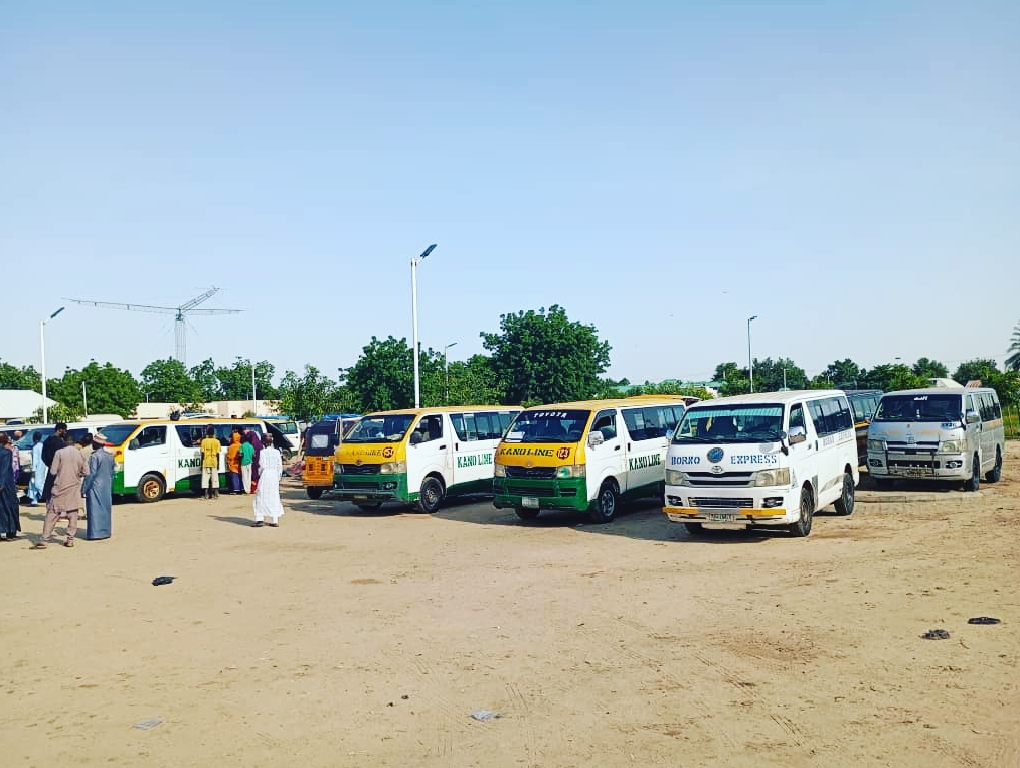
Terminus in Maiduguri

The city lies at the end of a railway line connecting Port Harcourt, Enugu, Kafanchan, Kuru, Bauchi, and finally Maiduguri.

The city is served by the Maiduguri International Airport.

== Economy ==
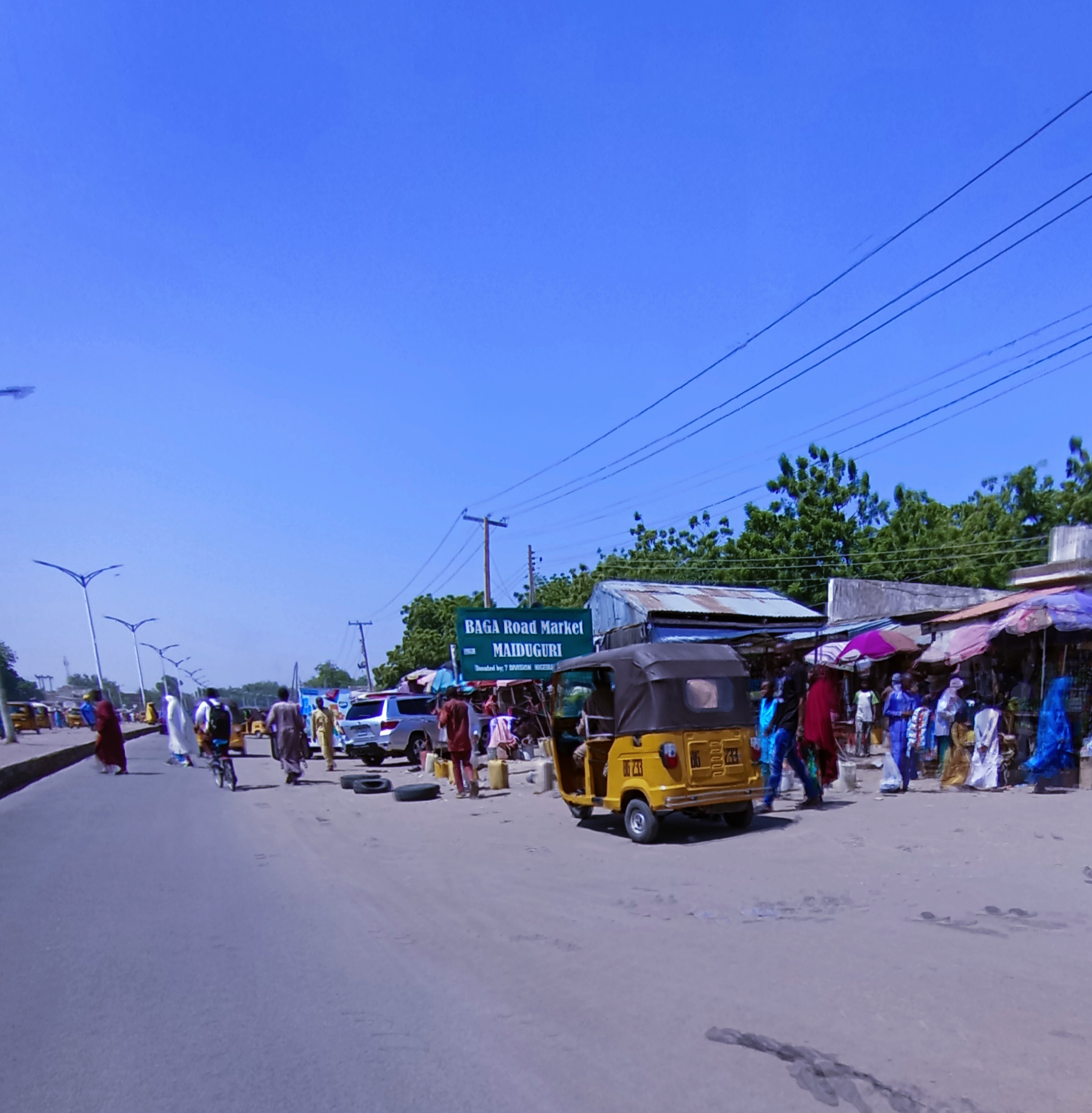
Baga Road Market Maiduguri

Maiduguri is the principal trading hub for north-eastern Nigeria. Its economy is largely based on services and trade with a small share of manufacturing.

Maiduguri is home to three markets, one of which is a modern "Monday market". This particular market is said to have a spectacular view.

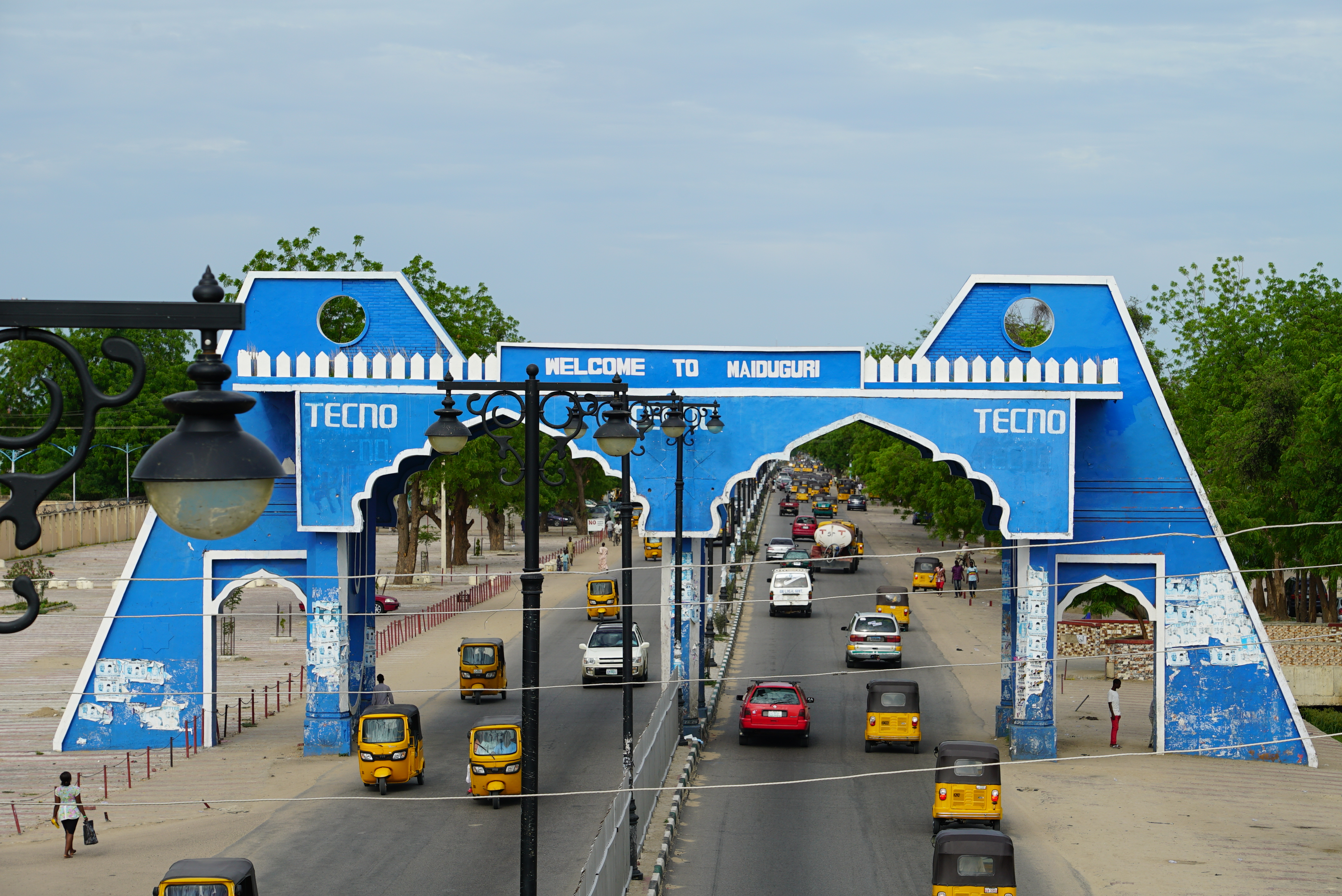
The city gate to the city of Maiduguri, with location transportation and larger personal vehicles. Maiduguri is a regional trading hub with traffic and goods flowing in and out of the city from all directions, as communities bring goods to trade.

The city has an appealing layout, with wide, well-maintained streets, sidewalks and flood management ditches. Electricity is provided by grid connections, solar power and by generators. The values of land and properties are high. A 2009 survey of property markets in Nigeria positioned Maiduguri as the third most expensive for buying and renting in after Abuja and Lagos.

A journalist who described local commerce wrote that "on the edge of the city, never-ending lines of lorries spend days waiting to take their cargoes to Dikwa and beyond to neighbouring Cameroon."

"Transport of goods to land-locked countries such as Chad, Central African Republic and Sudan" has suffered due to road ambushes.

Rural-urban migration to Maiduguri, combined with migration from Chad, Niger and Cameroon, has led to increases in poverty and unemployment

Firewood gathering is a source of income for newer residents who have been displaced by violence, and the harvest shortfalls resulting from climate change. Members of Maiduguri's official Association of Firewood Sellers provide labor for tree replanting efforts.

An additional source of support for displaced persons is a mobile phone-based cash distribution site which was set up by the World Food Programme and the Nigerian Government.

== Education ==
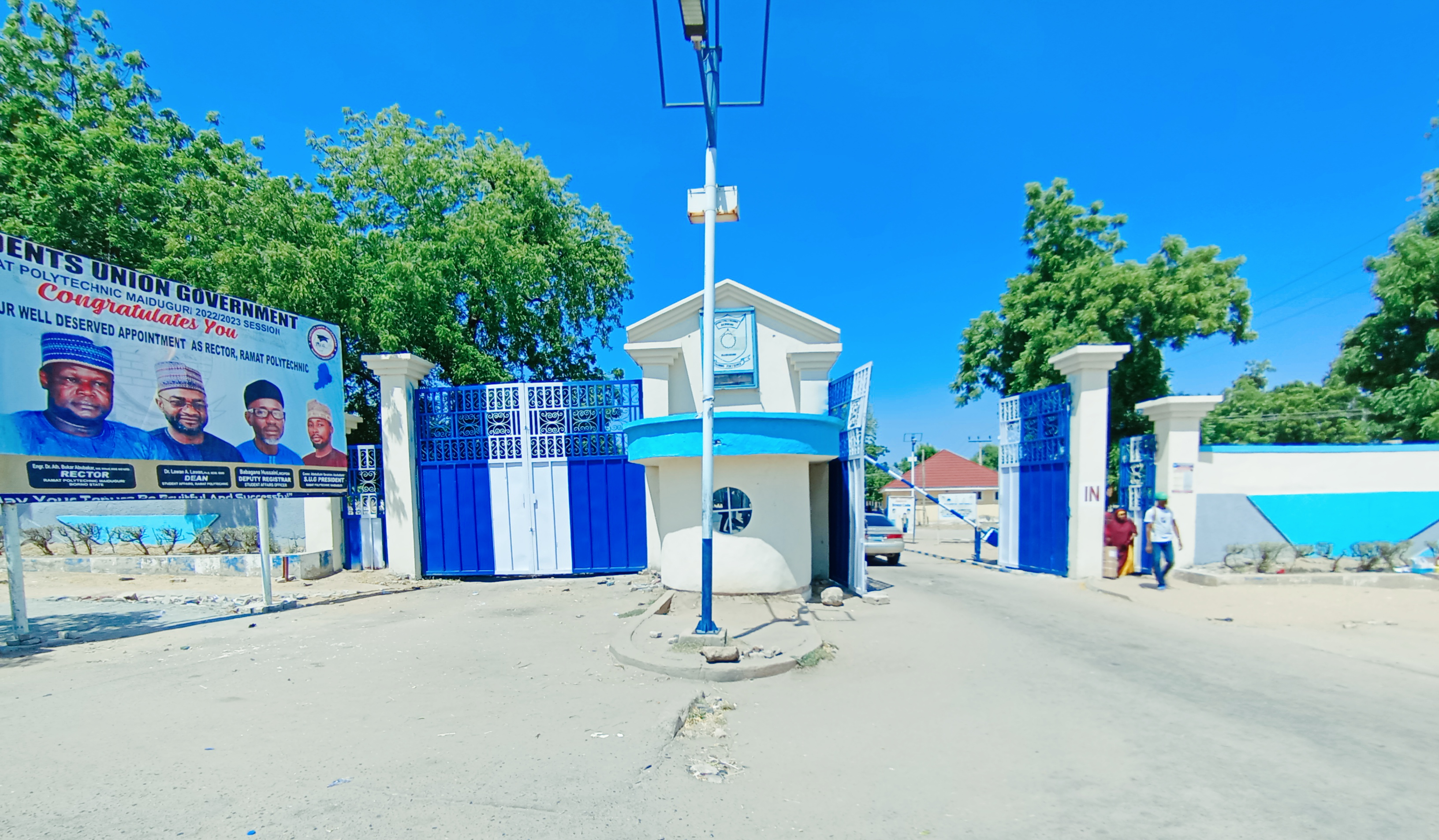
Main Gate of Ramat Polytechnic.

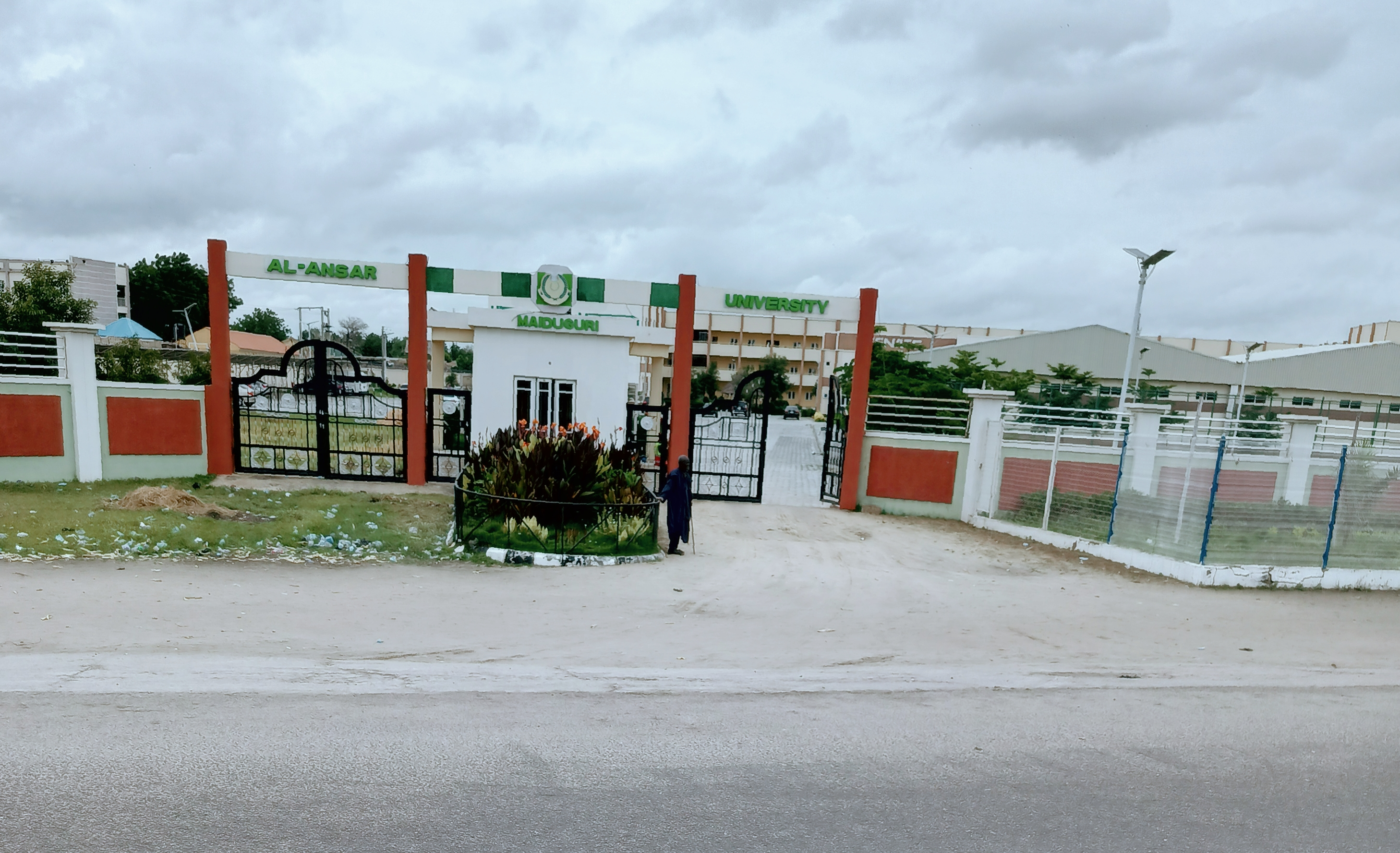
Al'ansar University maiduguri, Borno state

The University of Maiduguri was founded in 1975. There is also the College of Medical Sciences. Other higher institutions include the Borno State University, Ramat Polytechnic, College of Agriculture and College of Education, Muhammad Goni College of Legal and Islamic Studies, College of Nursing and Midwifery, College of Health Technology and El-kanemi College of Islamic Theology, Annahada College of Science and Islamic Studies.

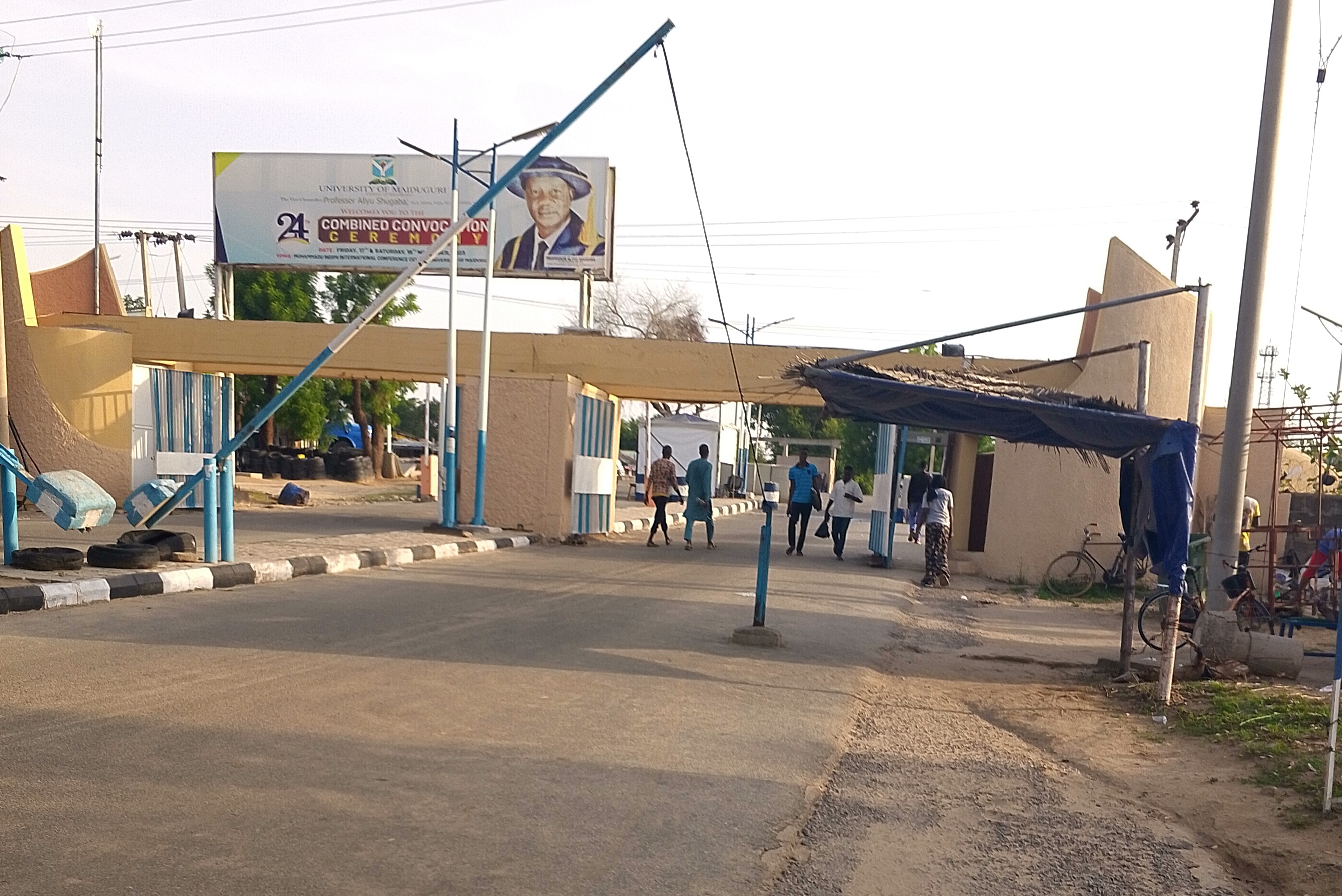
University of Maiduguri main gate, Borno state

As of 2011, the Future Prowess Islamic School provided a free, co-ed Western and Islamic education to orphans and vulnerable children.

== Places of worship ==
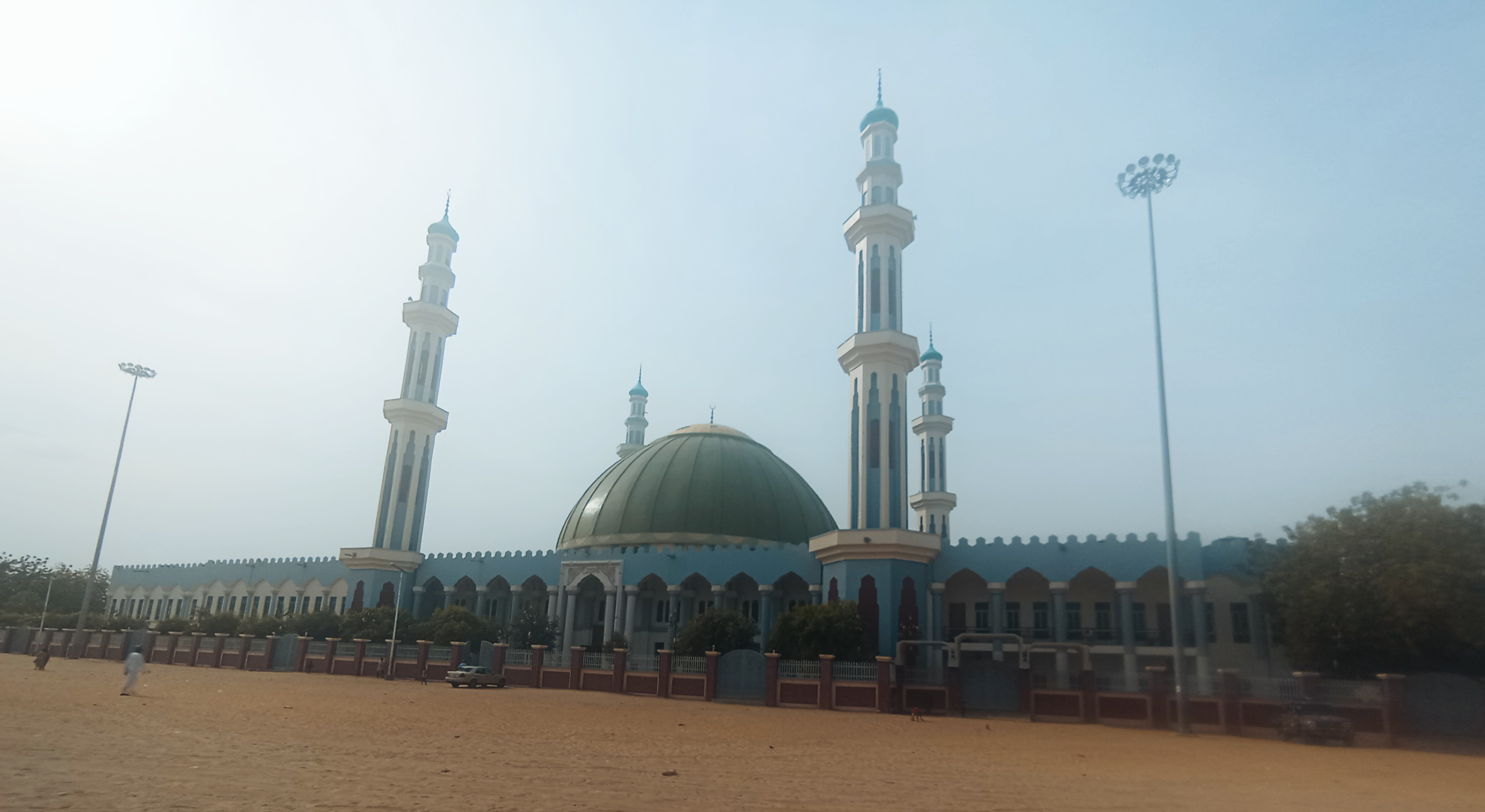
Central Mosque of Maiduguri

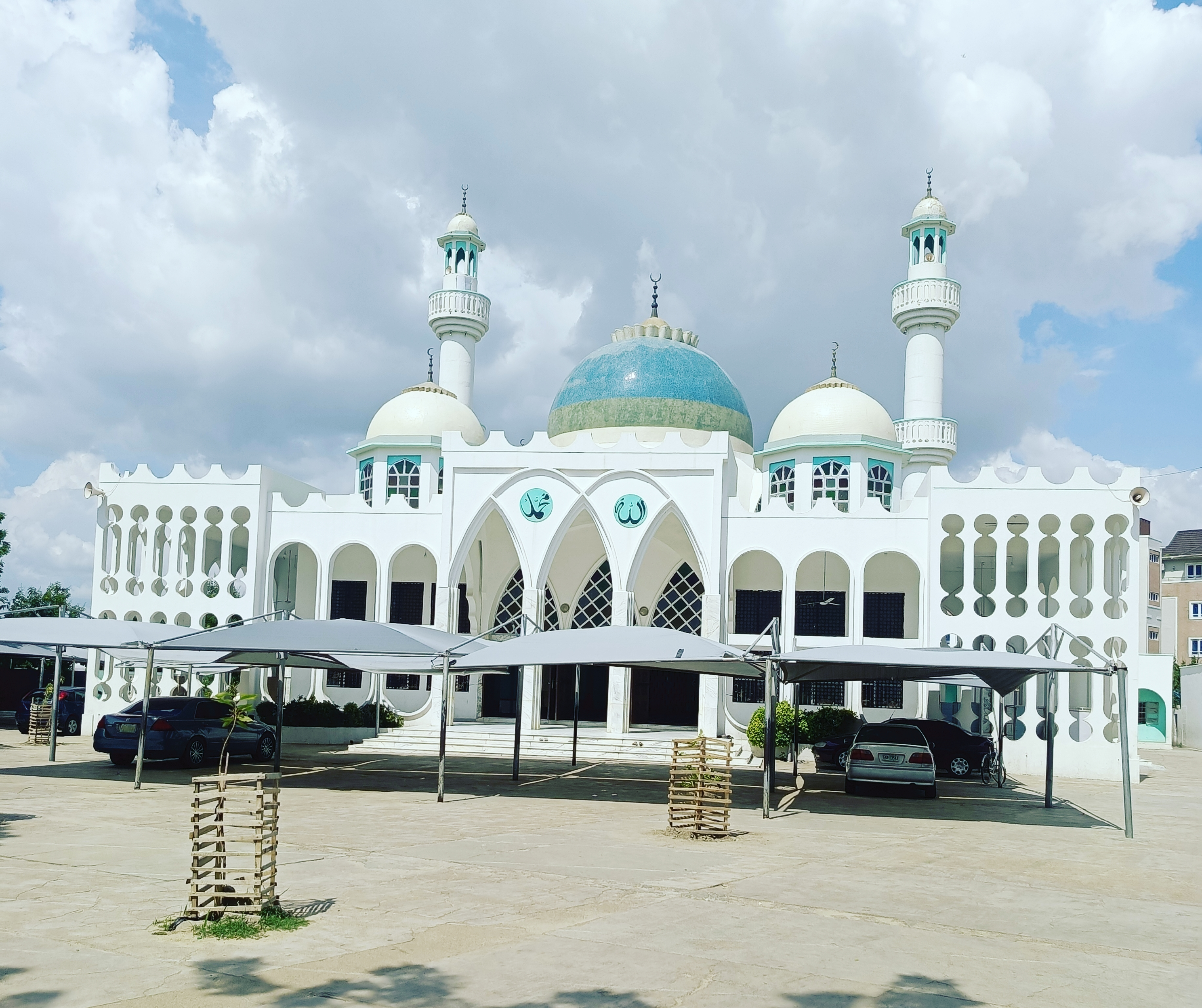
Indumi jummu'at mosque Maiduguri Borno state

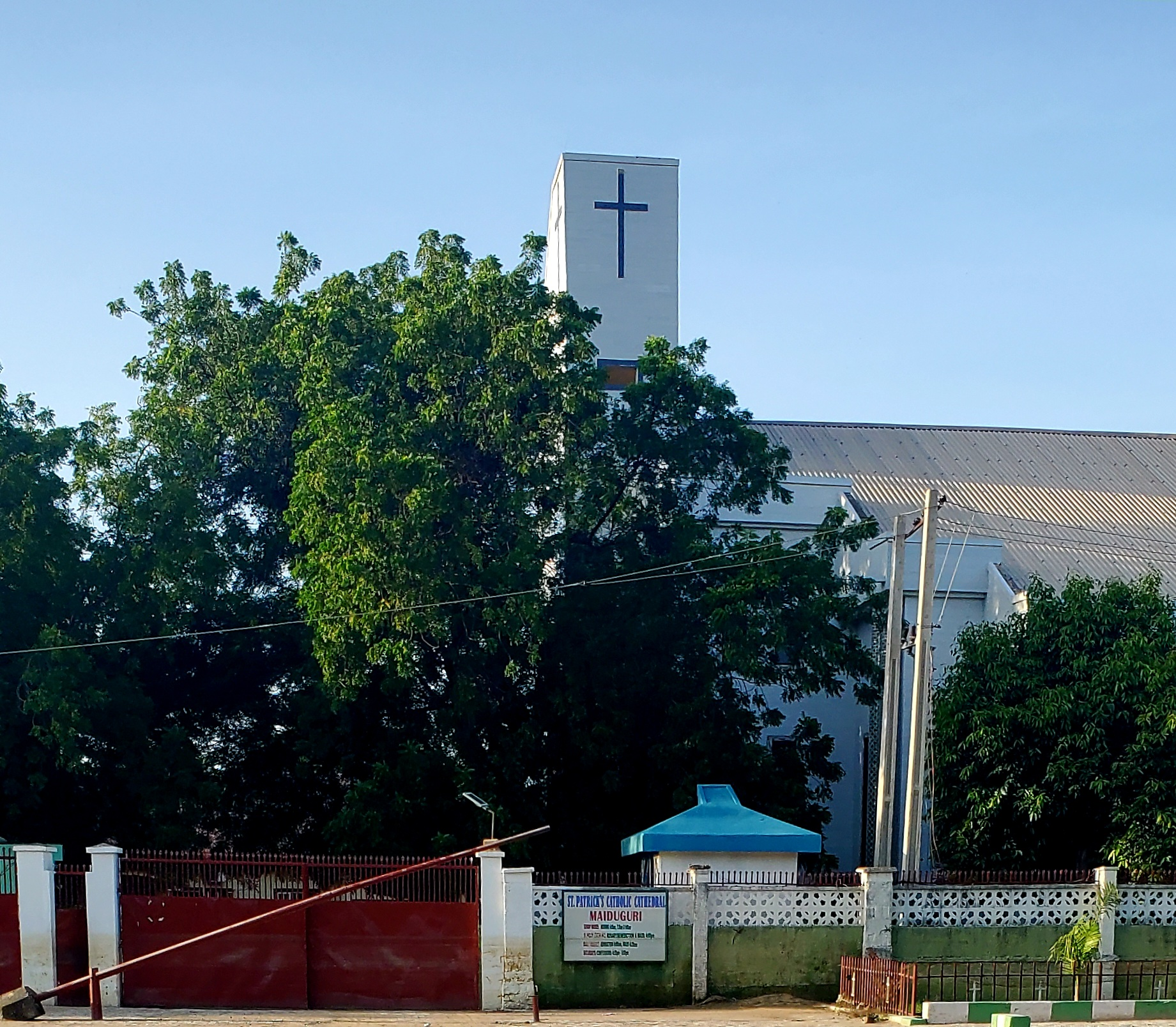
St. Patrick's Catholic Church Maiduguri.

Places of worship are predominantly Muslim mosques. There are also Christian churches and temples: Church of Nigeria (Anglican Communion), Church of the Brethren in Nigeria (EYN), Presbyterian Church of Nigeria (World Communion of Reformed Churches), Nigerian Baptist Convention (Baptist World Alliance), Living Faith Church Worldwide, Redeemed Christian Church of God, Assemblies of God, Roman Catholic Diocese of Maiduguri.

== Sports and leisure ==
Maiduguri is home to the El-Kanemi Warriors, a football team and the city has an active local football league. The Kyarimi Park is the oldest and largest zoo in Nigeria. The zoo attracts thousands of visitors per year. The city is within a short driving distance to picnic areas in Alo Lake and Zambiza game reserve.

== See also ==
- Railway stations in Nigeria
- University of Maiduguri
