= Amos Gwamna Magaji =

Nigerian politician

Amos Gwamna Magaji (born July 29, 1971) is a Nigerian politician. He currently serves as the Federal Representative representing Zangon Kataf/Jaba constituency in Kaduna State in the 10th Nigerian National Assembly.

He is also the Chairman of the House Committee on Health in the 10th Nigeria National Assembly.
