= Muktar Tolani Shagaya =

Nigerian politician and philanthropist

Honourable Muktar Tolani Shagaya
- Born: 16 December 1989 (age 36); Kwara, Nigeria
- Occupation: Politician
- Political party: All Progressives Congress (APC)
- Website: www.muktarshagaya.com

Muktar Tolani Shagaya (born 16 December 1989) is a Nigerian politician and a current House of Representatives member in the 10th National Assembly, representing Ilorin West/Asa Federal Constituency since June 2023. He is the deputy chairman, House of the Representatives Committee on Basic Education & Services. Since assuming office as a member of the National Assembly, Shagaya Tolani has sponsored over 15 bills, co-sponsored several others, and introduced motions in the House of Representatives.

== Early life and education ==
Tolani Shagaya was born on December 16, 1989, in Ilorin, Kwara State, Nigeria, into the Shagaya family. He is a son of a Nigerian business-woman and industrialist, Bola Shagaya. He began his education at the Lebanese Community School in Yaba, Lagos, where he obtained his First School Leaving Certificate in 1999. He subsequently attended Adesoye College in Offa, Kwara State, and later Rockwell College in Ireland.

From 2003 to 2008, Shagaya pursued his A-level and GCSE education at Malvern College in Worcestershire, United Kingdom. He proceeded to the University of Plymouth, earning a Bachelor of Science (B.Sc.) degree in International Relations. He later obtained a master's degree in International Development and Development Management from the University of Manchester, United Kingdom.

== Works ==
In 2013, he served as a Junior Assistant at Infrastructure Bank PLC. He later held roles as the Business Development Manager at Karmod Nigeria Prefabricated Technologies and as an Energy Executive at the Rural Electrification Agency (REA). He was the executive director, Asolar Systems Nigeria Limited In 2023, he transitioned into politics and successfully contested for a seat in the House of Representatives, representing Kwara/Asa Federal Constituency.

== Politics ==
Tolani Shagaya is a member of the All Progressives Congress (APC) and serves as the representative for Ilorin/Asa Federal Constituency of Kwara State in the House of Representatives. He holds the position of Deputy Chairman of the House Committee on Basic Education and Services. Shagaya has sponsored numerous bills and moved several motions during his tenure in the National Assembly.

=== Bills sponsored ===
- Bills for the establishment of Federal Medical Centre Afon, Kwara State.
- A bill for an Act to provide the establishment of the Medical Center, Aboto, Kwara State; health education practitioner board
- A bill for an Act to amend the 1999 constitution of Nigeria to enable foreign men married to confer jurisdiction on the Federal High Court handle and prosecute electoral offenders.
- A Bill for an Act to alter section 11, sub-section 1A of the Universal Basic Education Act in order to increase the Consolidated Revenue Fund that is allocated to the Universal Basic Education Fund from 2% to 4%.
- A bill for an Act to amend the Universal Basic Education Act to provide that the federal government extends free, compulsory and universal basic education up to senior secondary level and other related matters.
- A bill for the establishment of the Federal Cancer Research and Treatment Center, Asa, Kwara State.
- A bill for the establishment of a Federal Cancer Research and Treatment Center in all geo-political zones in Nigeria.
