= Afiz Oluwatoyin =

Afiz Ogun Oluwatoyin is a Nigerian surgeon, educator and public administrator currently serving as Director General and chief Executive Officer of Industrial Training Fund (ITF), appointed by President Bola Tinubu since 2023.

== Career ==
Oluwatoyin began his career as a dental surgeon and as an educator focused on curriculum design, youth mentorship, and vocational capacity building. He practiced for four decades before transiting into public administration in October 2023 when he was appointed as Director General and chief Executive Officer of Industrial Training Fund (ITF) by President Bola Tinubu.

At the ITF, Oluwatoyin initiated several policies and programs including Skill-Up Artisans (SUPA) focused on providing advanced technical training to artisans in information and communication technology (ICT), electrical installations, fashion, plumbing and others with certifications and licensing and startup packs. He coordinates skills acquisition program, the Technical Skills Development Project (TSDP) in partnership with the Nigeria Employers’ Consultative Association (NECA) training youths practical skills for employability and entrepreneurship in specialized trades and occupations. He is credited for establishing vocational training partnerships with foreign institutions and chambers of commerce in countries including Turkey.
