= Bola Shagaya =

Nigerian businesswoman (born 1959)

Hajia Bola Shagaya MON
- Born: 10 October 1959 (age 67); Ilorin, Northern Region, British Nigeria (now in Kwara State, Nigeria)
- Education: Ahmadu Bello University; Armstrong College
- Occupation: Business magnate

Hajia Bola Muinat Shagaya MON (10 October 1959) is a Nigerian businesswoman and fashion enthusiast. She is one of the richest women in Africa. She is the founder and CEO of Bolmus Group International, a conglomerate with holdings in real estate, oil and gas, banking and photography.

== Biography ==
Hajia Bola Muinat Shagaya was born on 10 October 1959 in Ilorin. Her mother was Saadat Bakini. Bola Shagaya attended Queens School, Ilorin, for her secondary school education and Ahmadu Bello University, Zaria, as well as Armstrong College in California, for her tertiary education, where she studied economics and accountancy.

She started her career with the audit department of the Central Bank of Nigeria before venturing into commercial activities in 1983. Her business experience started with the importation and distribution of photographic materials. She introduced the Konica brand of photographic materials into the Nigerian market and West Africa.

Hajia Bola Muinat Shagaya is also the managing director of Practoil Limited, one of the largest importers and distributors of base oil in Nigeria, serving local lubricant blending plants. Her business also includes investments in real estate, spanning across major cities in the country with over three hundred employees.

She is currently on the board of Unity Bank plc (formerly Intercity Bank) and has been for over eight years. She is also a member of the recently inaugurated Nepad Business Group – Nigeria. Hajia Bola Shagaya is a patron of the Fashion Designers Association of Nigeria (FADAN).

== Distinctions ==
- July 2010: Member of the Order of the Niger (MON) awarded by the former President of the Federal Republic of Nigeria, Dr. Goodluck Ebele Jonathan (GCFR)

== Private life ==
She is currently married to Alhaji Shagaya, a Kwara State-based transport mogul, and has six children. Sherif Shagaya, Hakeem Shagaya, Deeja Shagaya, Naieema Shagaya, Amaya Roberts and Adeena Roberts. Her children are dispersed across the world, growing the Real Estate empire in both Europe and the United States. Also involved in minor business and industry holdings across Asia and Australia.
