= March 2015 Maiduguri suicide bombing =

Terrorist incident in Nigeria

Coordinates: 11.8333°N 13.1500°E

2015 Maiduguri suicide bombing
- Part of the Boko Haram insurgency
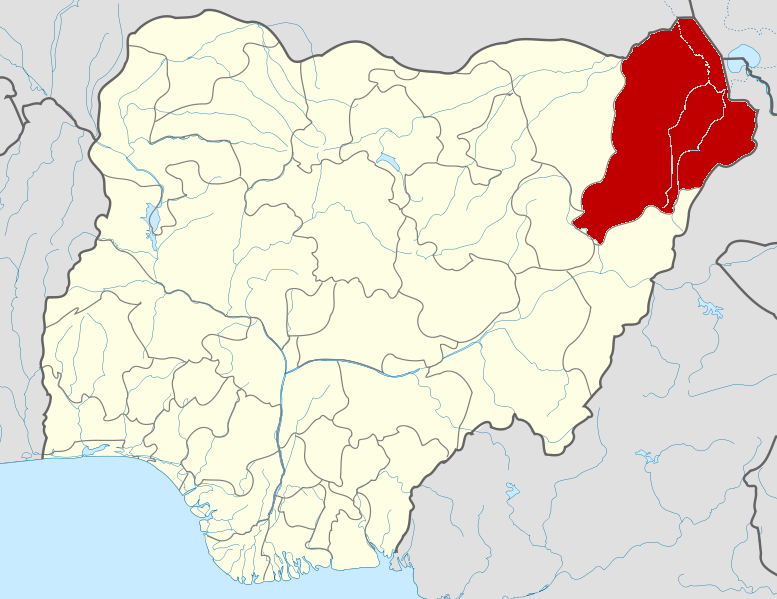
- Location of Borno State in Nigeria
- Location: Maiduguri, Borno State, Nigeria
- Date: March 7, 2015
- Attack type: bombing
- Weapon: Bomb
- Deaths: 58
- Injuries: 143

On March 7, 2015, a suicide bomber blew himself up on a cycle rickshaw near a fish market in Maiduguri in northeast Nigeria, and killed at least 10 people. Later, it was officially reported that there were a series of five bomb blasts carried out by suicide bombers on the same day in five different areas of the city. According to multiple sources, 58 people were killed and over 143 people wounded.

According to witnesses and various news reports, the first bomber was likely a 16-year-old boy who tried to enter Baga fish market in Maiduguri.

The second blast is thought to have been a twin explosion which hit another market known as Monday market at around 12:30. According to BBC reports, the attack was carried out by two women. The third explosion took place at around 12:52 near a Department of State Security office. According to the BBC report, "several witnesses believed it was a twin explosion as well".

No terrorist group claimed responsibility for the explosions immediately, but multiple sources noted that the terror group Boko Haram may be responsible for the attack as the blasts have similarities to previous Boko Haram attacks.

On March 8, 2015, the death toll increased to 58, according to Nigerian police.
