= Universal Basic Education Commission (Nigeria) =

Nigeria's federal government agency

The Universal Basic Education Commission simply known as UBEC is a federal government Agency that has the mandate to formulate and coordinate all programmes of the Universal Basic Education programme prescribe the minimum standards for basic education in Nigeria. The Universal Basic Education Commission (UBEC) was established by the Compulsory, Free Universal Basic Education and Other Related Matters Act of 2004 to eradicate illiteracy, ignorance and poverty as well as to stimulate and accelerate national development, political consciousness and national integration to fulfil the national philosophy and goals of education which underlines with the country’s aspiration to social, economic and political development. Unesco in 1990 collaborated with Nigeria to promote the Ubec vision, with the aim of achieving Education for all (EFA) and reducing illiteracy rates. Ubec has worked in collaboration with UNESCO since 1990, when UNESCO launched the global "Education for All" initiative aimed at promoting Universal access to Basic education Amd reducing illiteracy world wide this partnership as provided Nigeria with technical support, policy guidance and alignment with international education standard Through this collaboration ubec has been able to strengthen education policy in line with global bench marks and develop strategies to reduce Out-of-school children.

== History ==
The Federal Government of Nigeria first introduced the Universal Basic Education Programme in 1999 as a reform programme in education aimed at providing greater access to and ensuring the quality of basic education in Nigeria. The UBE Programme as a free, universal, and compulsory basic education programme was later backed by the UBE Act 2004, which made the provision for basic education consisting of Early Childhood Care and Education (ECCE), Primary education and Junior Secondary Education. The programme is seen as a demonstration of Nigeria’s commitment to global protocols and conventions on education. These include the Rights of the Child Convention (1989) and the World Declaration on Education for All and Framework for Action to Meet Basic Learning Needs (1990). One of the major goal of the UBE programme is to ensure that all children, regardless of ethnicity, religion, class, or gender, have access to quality basic education. Hence Access, Equity and Quality are the cardinal pursuits of the UBE programme.

== Mandate ==
The Universal Basic Education Commission (UBEC) law (UBE Act, 2004) established the commission as the intervention agency responsible for the disbursement of the Federal Government Universal Basic Education Intervention to states and other stakeholders and the coordination of the implementation of the UBE programme throughout Nigeria. The Law defines Basic education to include: "Early childhood care and development education, nine years of formal schooling (6 years of primary and 3 years of junior secondary education, adult literacy and non-formal education, skills acquisition programmes and the education of special groups such as nomads and migrants, girl-child and women, almajirai, street children and disabled groups" (UBE Act, 2004, p. 29). It also defines the functions of the Commission to include the following:

- (a) formulate the policy guidelines for the successful operation of the Universal Basic Education Programme in the Federation;
- (b) receive block grants from the Federal Government and allocate to the States and Local Governments and other relevant agencies implementing the Universal Basic Education in accordance with an approved formula as may be laid down by the Board of the Commission and approved by the Federal Executive Council; provided that the Commission shall not disburse such grants until it is satisfied that the earlier disbursements have been applied in accordance with the provisions of this Act;
- (c) prescribe the minimum standards for basic education throughout Nigeria in line with the National Policy on Education and the directive of the National Council on Education and ensure the effective monitoring of the standards;
- (d) enquire into and advise the Federal Government on the funding and orderly development of basic education in Nigeria;
- (e) collate and prepare after consultation with the States and Local Governments, and other relevant stakeholders, periodic master plans for a balanced and coordinated development of basic education in Nigeria including areas of possible intervention in the provision of adequate basic education facilities which include: (i) proposals to the Minister for equal and adequate basic education opportunity in Nigeria; (ii) the provision of adequate basic education facilities in Nigeria; and 12 (iii) ensure that the Basic Education Curricula and Syllabi and other necessary instructional materials are in use in early childhood care and development centres, primary and junior secondary schools in Nigeria;
- (f) carry out in concert with the States and Local Governments at regular intervals, a personnel audit of teaching and non-teaching staff of all basic education institutions in Nigeria;
- (g) monitor Federal inputs into the implementation of basic education;
- (h) present periodic progress reports on the implementation of the Universal Basic Education to the President through the Minister; (i) co-ordinate the implementation of the universal basic education related activities in collaboration with non-governmental and multi-lateral agencies;
- (j) liaise with donor agencies and other development partners in matters relating to basic education;
- (k) develop and disseminate curricula and instructional materials for basic education in Nigeria;
- (l) establish a basic education data bank and conduct research on basic education in Nigeria;
- (m) support national capacity building for teachers and managers of basic education in Nigeria;
- (n) carry out mass mobilization and sensitization of the general public and enter into partnerships with communities and all stakeholders in basic education with the aim of achieving the overall objectives of the Compulsory Free Universal Basic Education in Nigeria;
- (o) carry out such other activities that are relevant and conducive to the discharge of its functions under this Act; and
- (p) carry out such other functions as the Minister may, from time to time, determine.

The UBE Commission also correlates with the State Governments to facilitates its activities through their respective State Universal Basic Education Boards (SUBEBs) and the Local Government Education Authorities (LGEAs) established by law passed by each State House of Assembly.

== Administration ==
The UBEC’s administration is headed by an executive secretary appointed by the president on the recommendation of Education Ministry. The highest decision making body of UBEC is the Governing Board headed by a Chairman and Secretary (which is the executive secretary of the commission) and members. The board members are representatives of federal ministries, institutions and professional organisations which include Federal Ministries of Education and Finance, Federal Colleges of Education (Technical), Federal Colleges of Education (Conventional), State Colleges of Education, Nigerian Academy of Education and Nigerian Union of Teachers.

== See also ==
- Rivers State Universal Basic Education Board (RSUBEB)
