= January 2015 Maiduguri suicide bombing =

Terrorist incident in Nigeria

- Location: Maiduguri, Nigeria
- Deaths: 19

At least 19 people were killed by a girl aged about 10 in a suicide bombing attack.
