= House Committee on Aids, Loans and Debt Management =

Legislative committee of the Nigerian national assembly

House Committee on Aids, Loans, and Debt Management

- Type: Committee
- Purpose: Oversight of aids, loans, and debt management in government
- Headquarters: National Assembly, Abuja, Nigeria
- Region served: Nigeria
- Chairman: Abubakar Hassan Nalaraba
- Deputy Chairman: Lanre Okunlola
- Parent organization: Federal House of Representatives
- Website: www.nass.gov.ng

The House Committee on Aids, Loans, and Debt Management is a standing committee of the Federal House of Representatives in Nigeria. It is tasked with overseeing the management of the nation's external borrowings, ensuring that loans and foreign aids are used effectively and transparently. The committee evaluates loan requests, scrutinizes their potential impact on Nigeria's debt profile, and makes recommendations to the House.

As of January 2025, the committee is chaired by Honourable Abubakar Hassan Nalaraba, with Honourable Lanre Okunlola serving as the deputy chairman. The committee has been involved in reviewing and approving loans as part of Nigeria's external borrowing plan, and plays a vital role in managing the country's debt and fiscal responsibility.

== History ==
The House Committee on Aids, Loans, and Debt Management was established as part of the legislative framework for managing Nigeria's external financial obligations. The committee was formed to ensure transparency and accountability in the handling of loans, foreign aids, and debt management within the federal government. Its creation was in response to increasing concerns about Nigeria's growing external debt and the impact it could have on the national economy.

Since its formation, the committee has been tasked with overseeing the negotiation and approval of loans, ensuring that such borrowing is done in a responsible and sustainable manner. It has played a critical role in reviewing external loan agreements, scrutinizing the terms of financial aid, and advising the House of Representatives on the implications of government borrowing. The committee has continuously worked to ensure that external debts are managed in line with the country's economic goals, with a focus on supporting Nigeria's development agenda.

== Members ==
The membership of the House Committee on Aids, Loans, and Debt Management consists of elected representatives from the National Assembly of Nigeria, typically from various political parties. Members are appointed based on their expertise and interest in fiscal management, public finance, and debt oversight.

The committee is led by a chairperson, who is responsible for directing its activities and ensuring the effective execution of its functions. Other members include deputy chairpersons, as well as various members who contribute to different subcommittees and task forces established to address specific aspects of the committee's mandate.

As of 2025, the committee is chaired by:

- Abubakar Hassan Nalaraba – Chairperson
- Lanre Okunlola – Deputy Chairperson

== See also ==
- House Committee on Appropriations
- House Committee on Finance (Nigeria)
- Federal Ministry of Finance (Nigeria)
- Debt Management Office (Nigeria)
- National Assembly of Nigeria
