= House Committee on Finance =

Legislative committee of the Nigerian national assembly

- House committee providing oversight of Nigeria’s financial systems
- Abbreviation: HCOF
- Founder: National Assembly of Nigeria
- Type: Standing Committee
- Legal status: Active
- Purpose: Oversight of public finance, revenue generation, fiscal policy, and national budgeting
- Headquarters: National Assembly, Abuja, Nigeria
- Region served: Nigeria
- Official language: English
- Chairman: James Faleke
- Deputy Chairman: Abubakar Makki Yalleman
- Main organ: Federal House of Representatives
- Parent organization: National Assembly of Nigeria
- Affiliations: Ministry of Finance, Budget, and National Planning
- Website: www.nass.gov.ng
- Remarks: Responsible for monitoring Nigeria's fiscal discipline and revenue policies

The House Committee on Finance is a standing committee of the House of Representatives in Nigeria. The committee is responsible for overseeing financial matters in the country, including revenue generation, budget planning, and fiscal policies.

The committee was created under Decree No. 24 of 1989, which established the legislative structure of the National Assembly of Nigeria following the military regime's restructuring of Nigeria's governance. The decree was part of the efforts to formalize the legislative procedures and the functions of various committees within the National Assembly

As of 2025, the committee is led by Honourable James Faleke as chairman and Honourable Abubakar Makki Yalleman as deputy chairman. The committee plays an important role in ensuring that public funds are used transparently and government spending is sustainable.

== History ==
The House Committee on Finance is one of the House of Representatives' standing committees in Nigeria. It was created to oversee the country's financial matters, such as national revenue generation, fiscal policies, budget planning, and monitoring government expenditures.

The committee was initially formed as part of the legislative framework for financial oversight in Nigeria. Its creation responded to the growing need for transparency in the management of public funds, especially as the nation faced increasing demands for better fiscal accountability.

Throughout its history, the committee has been crucial in evaluating and approving the national budget, scrutinizing the management of loans and financial resources, and advising on fiscal policies that impact the country's economic health. It also plays an essential role in ensuring that government agencies adhere to financial regulations and that public funds are utilized effectively. In recent years, it has expanded its functions to include oversight of Nigeria's external borrowings and foreign aid management, ensuring that such financial engagements do not harm the nation's fiscal stability.

In addition to its oversight functions, the committee actively participates in discussions regarding revenue generation strategies. It is tasked with recommending measures to enhance the nation's revenue streams. It has also been involved in the investigation of financial mismanagement, such as the case involving the Nigerian National Petroleum Corporation (NNPC), which led to significant scrutiny under the leadership of Honourable Abdulmumin Jibrin, who served as chairman of the committee during the 7th Assembly. Jibrin was instrumental in overseeing investigations into the NNPC's failure to remit funds to the federation account.

The committee comprises elected representatives from different political parties, which ensures diverse political representation and expertise in fiscal matters. The committee's membership is also based on individual qualifications and experience in public finance, making the committee a central point for legislative discussions on financial policy in Nigeria.

In recent years, the committee has been heavily involved in discussions on Nigeria's external borrowing plans, focusing on ensuring that loans are taken sustainably and responsibly. This aspect of its work has grown crucial as Nigeria continues to face pressure from international lenders and domestic needs for infrastructural development and fiscal reforms. The committee has ensured that such borrowing serves the national interest without exacerbating the country's debt burden.

== See also ==
- House Committee on Appropriations
- House Committee on Aids, Loans and Debt Management (Nigeria)
- Federal Ministry of Finance (Nigeria)
- Debt Management Office (Nigeria)
- National Assembly of Nigeria
