= Umar of Borno =

Umar (or Omar) of Borno (or Bornu) may refer to several different rulers of the Kanem–Bornu Empire and later traditional states in Nigeria:

- Umar I Idrismi, mai of the Kanem–Bornu Empire in the 14th century
- Umar II of Bornu, mai of the Kanem–Bornu Empire in the 15th century
- Umar III al-Maqdisi, mai of the Kanem–Bornu Empire in the 17th century
- Umar Kura, shehu of the Kanem–Bornu Empire 1837–1853 and 1854–1881
- Sanda Kura (real name Umar Sanda), shehu of the Kanem–Bornu Empire 1900 and then shehu of the Borno Emirate 1922–1937
- Sanda Kyarimi (real name Umar), shehu of the Borno Emirate 1937–1967
- Umar, shehu of the Borno Emirate 1968–1974
