= Bukar =

Bukar is a given name and surname. Notable people with the name include:

- Bukar Garbai (died 1922), Shehu of Bornu
- Bukar Ibrahim (born 1949), Nigerian politician
- Bukar Kura of Borno (c. 1830 – c. 1884), Shehu of Borno
- Bukar Shaib, Nigerian diplomat
- Bukar Suwa Dimka (1940–1976), Nigerian military officer
- Goni Bukar (died 2022), Nigerian politician
- Ibrahim Mohammed Bukar, Nigerian politician
- Mustapha Bukar, Nigerian politician
- Zanna Bukar Dipcharima (1917–1969), Nigerian politician

== See also ==
- Bukar–Sadong, Austronesian language
