= Mustafa ibn Umar el-Kanemi =

Mustafa
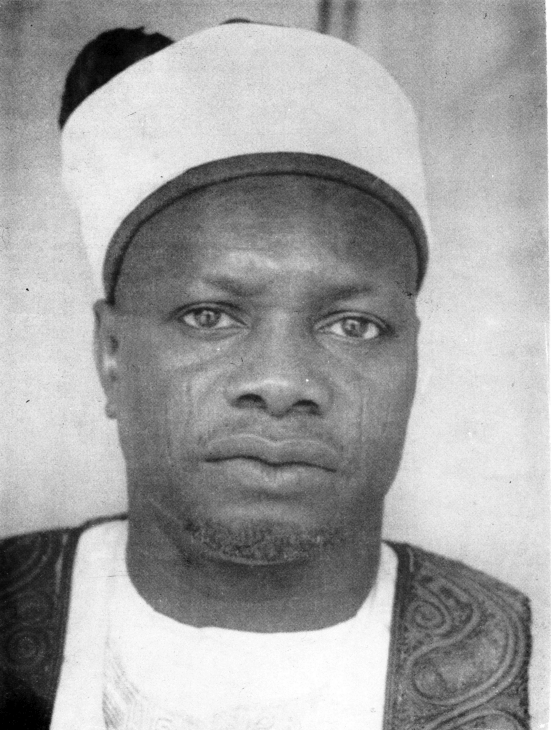
- Mustafa on the day of his coronation

Shehu of Borno
- Reign: 21 February 1975 – 21 February 2009
- Predecessor: Umar
- Successor: Abubakar
- Born: 1924; Dikwa, Colonial Nigeria
- Died: 21 February 2009 (aged 85); Gala'a Military Hospital, Cairo, Egypt
- Dynasty: al-Kanemi dynasty
- Father: Sanda Kyarimi

Mustafa ibn Umar Kiyari Amin el-Kanemi (1924 – 21 February 2009) was the shehu of the Borno Emirate, a traditional state in Nigeria, from 1975 to 2009.

== Early life and career ==
Mustafa ibn Umar el-Kanemi was the fourth son of Sanda Kyarimi (shehu of Dikwa 1917–1937 and shehu of Borno 1937–1967) and was born in Dikwa in 1924.

Mustafa began his education at the Dikwa Central Primary School in 1935. He later transferred to the Yerwa Central Elementary School, which he attended from 1937 to 1940. From 1941 to 1945 he continued his studies at the Borno Middle School. He took a clerical course at the Institute of Administration Kongo Zaria from 1953 to 1954.

Mustafa began an administrative career in 1945 as scribe (executive secretary) in the office of the Wali of Borno. From that point onwards, he also worked as a representative of the shehu in various political departments. From 1946 to 1951, Mustafa worked as a clerk in the central office of the Borno Native Authority, for instance overseeing the veterinary department in Nguru. In 1951 he became a constable for the Native Authority Police Department and rose to the rank of lance corporal.

In 1956, Mustafa was elected as a member of the Northern Nigerian House of Assembly, representing the Northern People's Congress. Mustafa was re-elected in 1959. In 1961, he was appointed as a Parliamentary Secretary (Junior Minister) in the Ministry of Lands & Surveys of the Northern Region. Following his career in politics, Mustafa returned to Maiduguri, the seat of the Borno Emirate, in 1966. In Borno he served as district head of Mafa (1968–1970) and then Nganzai (1970–1974).

== Shehu of Borno ==
The shehu of Borno, Umar ibn Abubakar Garbai al-Kanemi, died on 20 August 1974. In the same year, the Majilasku Kaduwube (or "traditional kingmakers"), led by the Waziri of Borno, selected Mustafa to become the next shehu. Mustafa was formally invested as shehu and given his staff of office by Governor Musa Usman on 21 February 1975 (some sources give the wrong date 1 February). In his installation speech, Mustafa proclaimed that "I shall make every effort to be honest in dealing with my people and uphold justice, rule of law and fair play. I shall always work for the peace and progress of my people, irrespective of ethnic origin, religion or place of birth, and I will do my best to bring about improvement in the standard of living of the entire people of our Emirate."

Shortly after his installation as shehu, Mustafa was called to represent Nigeria at the funeral of Faisal of Saudi Arabia. Mustafa performed the Umrah during the same trip.

Mustafa is said to have "lived simple, behaved simple, related with all manner of people very simple and ruled with smiles, love, peace and carrot; there was no time that he ever used a stick." At one time Mustafa was vice president of the Nigerian Supreme Council for Islamic Affairs.

From at least the early 1990s onwards, Mustafa suffered from incurable cancer in the bone marrow of his lower limbs. Doctors had reportedly advised the shehu to amputate one of his legs to stop the cancer from spreading, but Mustafa turned down this advice since "Borno tradition demands that a shehu should be without physical blemish." Mustafa died on 21 February 2009, aged 85, at Gala'a Military Hospital in Cairo, Egypt. He had been flown to Cairo as his health deteriorated over the preceding week and it became clear that he needed urgent medical attention. Mustafa was succeeded as shehu by Abubakar ibn Umar Garba el-Kanemi.
