= Abubakar ibn Umar Garba el-Kanemi =

Shehu of Borno since 2009

Abubakar
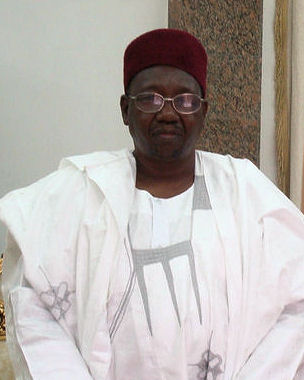
- Abubakar in 2011

Shehu of Borno
- Reign: 2 March 2009 – present
- Predecessor: Mustafa
- Born: 13 May 1957 (age 69); Damagum, Colonial Nigeria
- Dynasty: al-Kanemi dynasty
- Father: Umar ibn Abubakar Garbai al-Kanemi

Abubakar ibn Umar Garba Abba Kiyari el-Kanemi (born 13 May 1957) is the shehu of the Borno Emirate, a traditional state in Nigeria. He is the son of Umar ibn Abubakar Garbai al-Kanemi (shehu in 1968–1974) and the grandson of Abubakar Garbai (shehu in 1900 and 1901–1922).

Following a long career in various local governments in Borno State, Abubakar was appointed as shehu by Governor Ali Modu Sheriff in 2009. Much of his tenure has been marked by the violent Boko Haram insurgency, which has been largely concentrated in northeastern Borno State. Abubakar narrowly avoided assassination by Boko Haram in 2012.

== Early life and education ==
Abubakar ibn Umar Garba el-Kanemi was born in Damagum, Yobe State, Nigeria on 13 May 1957. Abubakar is the son of Umar ibn Abubakar Garbai al-Kanemi (who served as shehu in 1968–1974) and is named after his grandfather, Abubakar Garbai (shehu in 1900 and 1901–1922). Abubakar's father was the village head of Damagum at the time of Abubakar's birth but was shortly thereafter appointed as the district head of Maiduguri, the capital of the Borno Emirate. Before he became shehu, Abubakar was addressed as Abba Kyari, referring to his relation to Abubakar Garbai; Abba means "prince" and Kiyari is derived from cari ("old"), suggesting "grandfather".

Abubakar grew up in Maiduguri and commenced his education in 1964. He began his studies at the Gamboru Junior Primary School in January 1964 and studied there for four years before he was transferred to the Shehu Garbai Primary School, where his primary education was completed in December 1970. Abubakar completed his secondary education at the Government College in Maiduguri in 1975. In 1975, Abubakar was admitted to the Staff Training Centre, Potiskum where he obtained the Intermediate Local Government Certificate in 1976. He attended Kaduna Polytechnic (1978–1982) and Ahmadu Bello University, Zaria (1985–1986) where he obtained an Advanced Diploma in Local Government Administration. In 1996–1997, Abubakar was enrolled at the University of Maiduguri and obtained a Postgraduate Diploma in Industrial and Labour Relations. In 1998, Abubakar completed a master's degree in Industrial and Labour Relations at the University of Maiduguri and he returned in 1999–2000 to complete a second master's degree, in Public Administration.

== Governmental career ==
Abubakar's career in government began in July 1976, when he was appointed as a Clerical Officer with the Ministry of Local Government. He was later promoted to Assistant Inspector in the local government of Bama, from which he in 1982 transferred to the Zonal Inspectorate Office in Potiskum. where he assisted the local zonal inspector and eventually succeeded him. In 1983, Abubakar was transferred to the Gubio and Nganzai local government areas as Special Assistant to Sole Administrator. On 5 December 1984, Abubakar became the Head of Administration of the Konduga local government, a post he served in until he was transferred to Monguno on 4 January 1985, where he held the same position. In September 1986 he moved back to Maiduguri, where he served as the Head of Administration of the Maiduguri Metropolitan Council.

Abubakar returned to the local government in Konduga in 1988, serving as Assistant Secretary. In 1989 he was appointed Secretary of the local government in Machina/Yusufari and in 1991 he became Director of Personnel Management in the Kaga local government. In April 1994, Abubakar was posted as the Director of Personnel Management in the local government of Marte and later continued in this position in Maiduguri and Kano in 1996–1997. Abubakar then went on to serve as Secretary in five local governments in quick succession: Bama (1997), Dikwa (1998), Kukawa (1999), Bayo (2000), and finally Ngala (2001). Abubakar has served as Permanent Secretary, Ministry of Finance and Economic Planning (from August 1993), Permanent Secretary in the Ministry of Works and Housing, and Permanent Secretary, Ministry for Local Government and Chieftaincy Affairs (from August 2008). On 30 October 2008, Abubakar was appointed as the district head of Magumeri.

== Shehu of Borno ==
=== Appointment ===
The previous shehu of Borno, Mustafa ibn Umar el-Kanemi, died on 21 February 2009. Abubakar was officially appointed as the new shehu by Ali Modu Sheriff, the governor of Borno State, on 2 March 2009. Two days later, on 4 March 2009, Abubakar was formally invested as shehu in the traditional investiture ceremony (bayatu in Kanuri language). On 29 May 2009, Sheriff presented Abubakar with his staff of office in a large ceremony. The event coincided with a celebration of Nigeria's Democracy Day.

On 3 June 2009, the Yoruba community pledged to fully support Abubakar to ensure the peaceful co-existence of the different ethnic and religious groups in Borno State.

=== Boko Haram crisis ===
Since 2009, Borno State has suffered from the Boko Haram insurgency, an armed rebellion by the militant jihadist Boko Haram. Boko Haram is opposed to the political establishment and the traditional elites of northern Nigeria. Initial successes of Boko Haram in Borno State have been attributed to ethnic affiliations, since insurgents could easily hide among their relatives, as well as poor social control by traditional elders. Abubakar did not enjoy the same popularity as some of Nigeria's other traditional elders, such as the emirs of Kano or Zaria, since he had been appointed by the governor recently and never publicly condemned abuses by the Nigerian security forces.

In 2012, Abubakar narrowly escaped assassination by Boko Haram when a suicide bomber attacked the Maiduguri Central Mosque during a Friday prayer. The Nigerian government of Muhammadu Buhari claimed successes against Boko Haram in 2018, though these claims were dismissed by Abubakar, who thanked the government for their efforts but stated that Borno was still suffering from killings and kidnappings at a daily basis and that "nobody dare move out of Maiduguri by 10 kilometres without being confronted, attacked by Boko Haram".

In 2020, Abubakar stated that 13 district heads in Borno had been killed by Boko Haram, and that Boko Haram had transitioned from operating near Maiduguri to setting up headquarters in other local government areas and towns in Borno. On account of the massive number of deaths and large-scale destruction of infrastructure Abubakar requested government funding for reconstruction projects. Nigeria launched a "safe corridor" programme in 2016 to de-radicalise, rehabilitate, and re-integrate former Boko Haram fighters. Abubakar criticised the programme in 2021, stating "Many people were killed along with their property for 12 years. And you people and the media expect us to forget and forgive the repentant terrorists?"

In August 2021, Abubakar stated that order had largely been restored in Borno and thanked the Buhari government for their support. Abubakar reported that all local government areas that had been under Boko Haram control had been liberated and that normal business activity had resumed across the state. The shehus of the Dikwa and Bama emirates in Borno State, relatives of Abubakar, lived in exile for much of the insurgency until both were able to be formally invested in their respective seats in February 2025. In 2024, Abubakar called on the government to "take the war to the doorsteps of the terrorists" calling for operations in areas with little to no civilian presence, such as Guzamala. In April 2025, Abubakar warned of increasing Boko Haram attacks in Borno.

=== Other activities ===
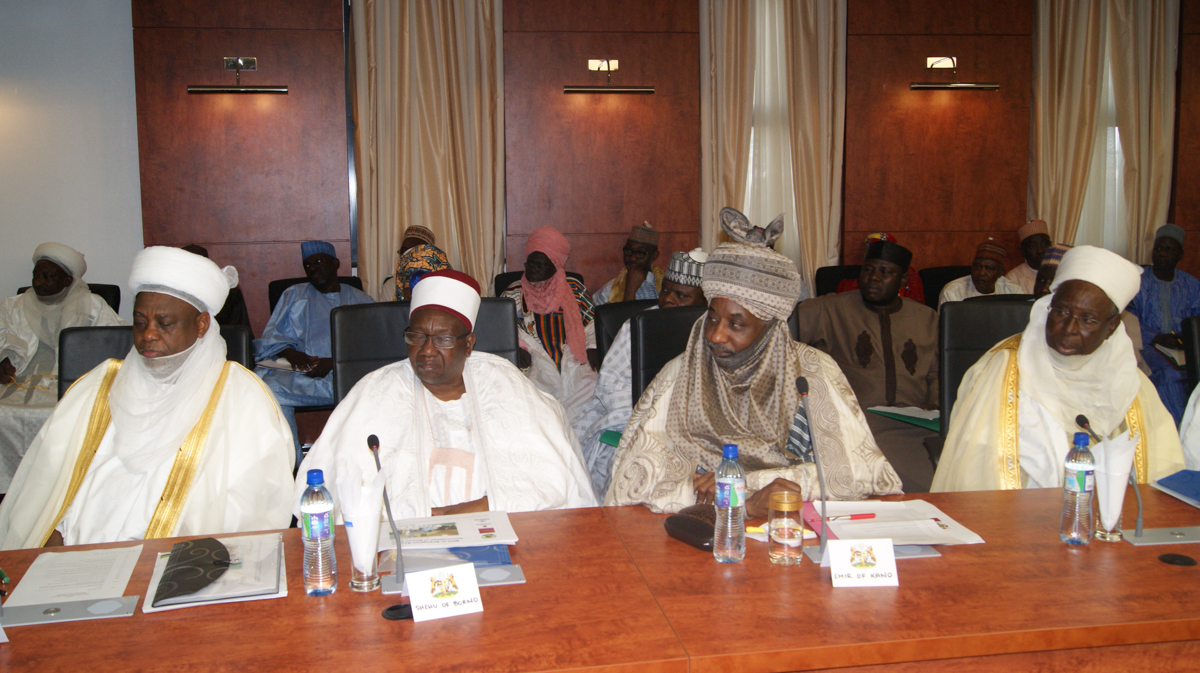
Abubakar (second from the left) at a meeting of leading Nigerian emirs in 2016. He is seated between Sa'adu Abubakar (Sultan of Sokoto, left) and Sanusi Lamido Sanusi (emir of Kano, right).

On 13 February 2010, Abubakar was awarded an honorary Doctorate of Philosophy (PhD) in Public Administration by the Houdegbe North American University Benin in Cotonou, Benin.

In December 2022, Abubakar was installed as the new chancellor of the Nile University of Nigeria. As chancellor, Abubakar is the university's honorary head and is able to represent it in a ceremonial and ambassadorial capacity. He also takes precedence over all other members of the universities at meetings.

In November 2023, Abubakar lamented the Nigerian government's long neglect of the Chad Basin, which is of vital economic importance to the people of Borno.

In September 2024, Abubakar encouraged President Bola Tinubu to investigate the cause of the collapse of the Alau Dam and the subsequent floodings in order to prevent similar incidents in the future.

== Family ==
Abubakar is married with three wives and has several children.
