= List of shehus of Bornu =

The shehu (sheikh) was the ruler of the late Kanem–Bornu Empire, at this stage often referred to as just Bornu or Borno, from 1846 to the end of the empire in 1902. The shehus belonged to the al-Kameni dynasty, the descendants of the scholar and military leader Muhammad al-Amin al-Kanemi, who became the first shehu in 1809. Al-Kameni became the effective ruler of Bornu in the aftermath of the Fula jihads, supplanting the power of the earlier line of rulers (the mais). The mai continued to be a figurehead ruler until 1846, when the last mai was killed and al-Kanemi's son Umar Kura assumed full power over the empire.

After 1902, the line of shehus has continued to rule the non-sovereign Borno Emirate in Nigeria, one of the country's traditional states. The shehu continues to serve as a ceremonial leader, preserving political and cultural continuity with the Kanem–Bornu Empire. Junior branches of the family also serve as shehus of the Dikwa Emirate (also established in 1902) and the Bama Emirate (established in 2010).

== Numbering ==
The shehus are numbered after uninterrupted periods of rule. The turbulent reigns of shehu Abubakar Garbai in 1900–1922 has for instance resulted in Garbai being counted as the 11th, 13th, 14th, and 15th shehu, because of depositions and retreats. From this it follows that Mustafa ibn Umar al-Kanemi is considered the 19th shehu of Bornu, and that the incumbent Abubakar ibn Umar Garba al-Kanemi is considered the 20th, despite being the 14th and 15th person, respectively, to hold the office.

== Sovereign shehus (1809–1902) ==
No.	Portrait	Name	Reign	Succession, notes	Seat
1		Muhammad al-Amin al-Kanemi (Laminu)	October/November 1809 – 8 June 1837	Islamic scholar and military leader who was pivotal in defending the Kanem–Bornu Empire during the Fula jihads. Accumulated enough power to supplant mai Dunama IX Lefiami as the de facto ruler of the empire. Technically assumed the style of shehu in 1814, at the time of the construction of his seat at Kukawa, but dated his reign to late 1809.	Ngurno (1809–1814); Kukawa (1814–1837)
2		Umar bin Muhammad al-Kanemi (Umar Kura)	8 June 1837 – 4 October 1853 (first reign)	Son of Muhammad al-Kanemi. The puppet mai Ibrahim IV Lefiami tried to take power in a civil war but was defeated and killed in 1846. After brief conflict with Ibrahim's son mai Ali V Minargema, The office of mai was abolished and Umar assumed de jure power over the empire. Deposed by his brother in the winter of 1853.	Kukawa
3		'Abd ar-Rahman bin Muhammad al-Kanemi (Darman)	4 October 1853 – 3 September 1854	Son of Muhammad al-Kanemi. Seized power from Umar in a coup in the winter of 1853. Deposed and executed by Umar less than a year later after a counter-coup.	Kukawa
4		Umar bin Muhammad al-Kanemi (Umar Kura)	3 September 1854 – December 1881 (second reign)	Returned to the throne through a counter-coup.	Kukawa
5		Abu Bakr bin Umar al-Kanemi (Bukar Kura)	December 1881 – November 1884 or February/March 1885	Son of Umar Kura. Bukar Kura's death after a short reign was unexpected and created a brief succession crisis.	Kukawa
6		Ibrahim bin Umar al-Kanemi (Ibrahim Kura)	November 1884 or February/March 1885 – October 1885/February 1886	Son of Umar Kura. Bukar Kura's son Kyari was considered to young to rule and the aristocracy initially backed Abba Mastafa, a son of Muhammad al-Kanemi. Despite this, Ibrahim seized power with the backing of the slave gunmen.	Kukawa
7		Hashim bin Umar al-Kanemi (Ashimi)	October 1885/February 1886 – November/December 1893	Son of Umar Kura. Defeated in battle by the Sudanese warlord Rabih az-Zubayr in August 1893. Fled across the Yobe River, abandoning the capital of Kukawa. Deposed in favor of Kyari, son of Bukar Kura, who then had him assassinated.	Kukawa (1886–1893); Maganwa (1893)
8		Muhammad al-Amin bin Abu Bakr al-Kanemi (Kyari)	November/December 1893 – February/March 1894	Son of Bukar Kura. Defeated by Rabih az-Zubayr and executed.	Geidam
9		Sanda bin Abu Bakr al-Kanemi (Sanda Wuduroma)	February/March 1894	Son of Bukar Kura. Fled to southern Bornu after Kyari's death, where he was made shehu in opposition to Rabih az-Zubayr. Captured and executed after less than a month.	—
Interregnum 1894–1900: Bornu was conquered by the Sudanese warlord Rabih az-Zubayr in 1892–1894. After the death of Sanda Wuduroma, Rabih became the country's undisputed master. Kukawa was destroyed and Rabih established a new capital at Dikwa. The empire was transformed into a brutal military dictatorship under Rabih, who ruled as emir. The French deemed Rabih an illegitimate usurper to justify conquests in the region and defeated him alongside Bornuan allies at the battle of Kousséri. Rabih's son Fadlallah bin Rabih briefly succeeded him but was himself defeated by the French at Gujba in 1901.
10		Umar Sanda ibn Ibrahim Kura al-Kanemi (Sanda Kura)	14 January – July/August 1900 (first reign)	Son of Ibrahim Kura. Led a group of al-Kanemi loyalists against Rabih az-Zubayr and was supported by French forces in the ensuing war. Proclaimed the new shehu in January 1900 and installed at Dikwa in April, after Rabih az-Zubayr's defeat. Removed from office by the French due to dissatisfaction with his governance.	Dikwa
11		Abu Bakr ibn Ibrahim Kura al-Kanemi (Abubakar Garbai)	July/August – 6 December 1900 (first reign)	Son of Ibrahim Kura. Made the new shehu at Dikwa by the French after the deposition of Sanda Kura, Abubakar Garbai being seen as more pliable. Lost Dikwa to Fadlallah bin Rabih on 30 November and defeated at Ngala on 6 December, whereafter he fled to Kanem for two months (during which his whereabouts and status was unknown to the people).	Dikwa (Jul./Aug.–Nov.); Ngala (Nov.–Dec.)
12		Muhammad al-Mustafa ibn Umar al-Kanemi (Masta Gumsumi)	Early December 1900 – February 1901	Son of Umar Kura and uncle of Abubakar Garbai and Sanda Kura. Made shehu by refugees from Ngala after Abubakar Garbai went missing. Dikwa was reoccupied by the French on 31 December 1900 and Gumsumi ruled there until Abubakar Garbai's return in February, when he fled from the city.	Dikwa
13		Abu Bakr ibn Ibrahim Kura al-Kanemi (Abubakar Garbai)	February – May/June 1901 (second reign)	Shehu again upon his return from Kanem. Abandoned Dikwa again upon news of Fadlallah bin Rabih's advance to Burguma, seeking French protection along the Chari River.	Dikwa
Interregnum 1901: Abubakar Garbai was still recognised as shehu in June–August 1901, but his brief abandonment of Dikwa until the defeat of Fadlallah in August is still counted as an interregnum.
14		Abu Bakr ibn Ibrahim Kura al-Kanemi (Abubakar Garbai)	August 1901 – April 1902 (third reign)	Undisputed ruler after Fadlallah bin Rabih's defeat. Became figurehead ruler in the British part of Bornu in April 1902, whereafter he left Dikwa and the entire country fell under British and French colonial rule.	Dikwa

== Later shehus (1902–present) ==
Abubakar Garbai left for British Bornu, where the line of shehus continued to serve as (non-sovereign) shehus of the Borno Emirate, a traditional state in Borno State, Nigeria. Dikwa, which fell under French rule, was placed under a junior branch of the family, beginning with Abubakar Garbai's relative Sanda Mandarama. Sanda Mandarama's successors continue to rule the separate Dikwa Emirate as shehus, also a traditional state in Borno State.

The British suggested that Abubakar Garbai take up residence at Mafoni, though he instead selected Monguno as his temporary seat, wishing to maintain a degree of independence and separate himself from the British military. The people of Bornu, and Abubakar Garbai himself, appear to initially have been under the impression that the British presence was a temporary affair, though the shehu agreed to certain British provisions, such as the abolition of slavery. It was originally intended to rebuild the old al-Kanemi capital at Kukawa. Abubakar Garbai moved there in 1903 and was invested as shehu among its ruins by Frederick Lugard in 1904. The ruined Kukawa was at the time however little more than "one large cornfield" and was no longer located along any major trade routes. The city also had an inadequate water supply and was inconvenient for the British since it was far from their major settlements. On 9 January 1907, Abubakar Garbai instead moved his capital to Yerwa, later called Maiduguri, which has since remained the capital of the Borno Emirate.

No.	Portrait	Name	Reign	Succession, notes	Seat
15		Abu Bakr ibn Ibrahim Kura al-Kanemi (Abubakar Garbai)	2 April 1902 – 1922 (fourth reign)	Previously the last sovereign shehu. Formally appointed "Shehu of Borno" by the British on 2 April 1902 and invested as shehu in a ceremony at Kukawa by Frederick Lugard in 1904. Swore an official oath of allegiance to Britain only in 1904, with some conditions. Confirmed as chief of the indigenous administration in Borno in 1914, with autonomy on taxes, police, and law. Aided Britain during World War I with transport, funds, and military information.	Monguno (1902–1903); Kukawa (1903–1907); Maiduguri (1907–1922)
16		Umar Sanda ibn Ibrahim Kura al-Kanemi (Sanda Kura)	1922 – middle of 1937 (second reign)	Reinvested as shehu after Abubakar Garbai's death. Remembered for his involvement in the production of books on Bornuan history, used in schools in Borno State.	Maiduguri
17		Umar ibn Muhammad al-Kanemi (Sanda Kyarimi)	25 May 1937 – 29 December 1967	Son of Kyari (the shehu in 1893–1894). Previously served as shehu of Dikwa.	Maiduguri
18		Umar ibn Abubakar Garbai al-Kanemi	27 March 1968 – 20 August 1974	Son of Abubakar Garbai	Maiduguri
19		Mustafa ibn Umar el-Kanemi	21 February 1975 – 21 February 2009	Son of Sanda Kyarimi. Selected to follow Umar ibn Abu Bakr in 1974 and invested as shehu by Governor Musa Usman in 1975.	Maiduguri
20		Abubakar ibn Umar Garba el-Kanemi	2 March 2009 – present	Son of Umar ibn Abubakar Garbai. Invested as shehu by Governor Ali Modu Sheriff in 2009.	Maiduguri

== Family tree ==
Simplified family tree of the shehus of Borno

Muhammad al-Kanemi; 1809–1837
Umar Kura; 1837–1853, 1854–1881	'Abd ar-Rahman; 1853–1854
Bukar Kura; 1881–1884/1885	Ibrahim Kura; 1884/1885–1885/1886	Ashimi; 1885/1886–1893	Masta Gumsumi; 1900–1901
Kyari; 1893–1894	Sanda Wuduroma; 1894	Sanda Kura; 1900, 1922–1937	Abubakar Garbai; 1900, 1901–1922
Sanda Kyarimi; 1937–1968	Umar; 1968–1974
Mustafa; 1975–2009	Abubakar; 2009–present
