= Bama Emirate =

Bama Emirate Bama
- Traditional state
- Location within Nigeria
- Coordinates: 11°31′8″N 13°41′3″E
- Country: Nigeria
- State: Borno State
- Founded: 2010
- Seat: Bama

Government
  - Shehu: Umar Kyari ibn Umar el-Kanemi

The Bama Emirate is a traditional state located in Borno State, Nigeria. The Bama Emirate was split from the Dikwa Emirate in 2010 and is governed by a branch of its ruling dynasty (the al-Kanemi dynasty). The emirate encompasses one Local Government Area, Bama itself, which previously served as the seat of the Dikwa Emirate.

== Background ==
In 1942, the seat of the Dikwa Emirate was moved from Dikwa to Bama at the request of the British colonial administration. The Dikwa Emirate was a large territorial unit, encompassing four Local Government Areas (Dikwa, Ngala, Kala-Balge, and Bama).

== History ==
In 2009, it was decided that the Dikwa Emirate was to be divided in two: the larger Dikwa Emirate was to retain three LGAs (Dikwa, Ngala, and Kala-Balge) and a new (smaller) Bama Emirate was to be created to include the former fourth LGA (Bama). In 2010, the incumbent ruler of the Dikwa Emirate, Kyari, was made ruler of the new Bama Emirate, while the rest of his territory was carved away as territory of a new shehu of Dikwa, Abba Masta II. Abba Masta II was also given precedence over Kyari, despite Kyari having ruled since 1990. Kyari was initially intended to continue to be styled as emir but was ultimately also recognised as a shehu.

The division of the Dikwa Emirate and the circumstances of Kyari's reduced position was controversial, especially since the Dikwa Emirate was given three out of the four LGAs. The state governor, Ali Modu Sheriff, was accused of corruption since he had relatives with influential titles in the emirates. Controversy soon died down as the two shehus worked together in harmony.

Due to the Boko Haram insurgency, much of Kyari's reign was spent in exile in Maiduguri. He died in Maiduguri in 2020, reportedly after a period of illness. It was widely speculated that Kyari died from COVID-19, though this was denied by Nigerian officials. Kyari's son Umar Kyari was swiftly appointed as his successor but not formally invested and crowned in Bama until 11 February 2025.

== Rulers ==
The rulers of the Bama Emirate are styled as shehus, similar to the rulers of the more senior Borno and Dikwa emirates.

No.	Name	Tenure	Succession, notes
1	Kyari ibn Umar el-Kanemi	2010–2020	Previously emir of the Dikwa Emirate.
2	Umar Kyari ibn Umar el-Kanemi	2025–present	Son of Kyari. Appointed in 2020 but not formally crowned until 2025.
