= Dikwa Emirate =

Dikwa Emirate Dikwa
- Traditional state
- Location within Nigeria
- Coordinates: 12°1′26″N 13°54′59″E
- Country: Nigeria
- State: Borno State
- Founded: 1902
- Capital: Dikwa (1902–1942); Bama (1942–2010); Dikwa (2010–present)

Government
  - Shehu: Ibrahim ibn Umar Ibrahim el-Kanemi

The Dikwa Emirate is a traditional state located in Borno State, Nigeria. Alongside the more senior Borno Emirate, the Dikwa Emirate is a remnant of the regime of the old Kanem–Bornu Empire, ruled by dynasts of the final Bornoan ruling dynasty (the al-Kanemi dynasty). The division of the Borno and Dikwa emirates can be traced back to the partitioning of the old empire's territory between British, French, and German colonial spheres of influence.

The Dikwa Emirate encompasses three Local Government Areas (Dikwa, Ngala, and Kala-Balge). The emirate also encompassed a fourth LGA, Bama, until it was separated into the distinct Bama Emirate in 2010.

== Background ==
The al-Kanemi dynasty traces its rule to the early 19th century, when Muhammad al-Amin al-Kanemi (r. 1814–1837) and his son Umar Kura (r. 1837–1881) supplanted the previous ruling lineage of the Kanem–Bornu Empire, the mais of the Sayfawa dynasty.

In 1893–1894, the empire was conquered by the Sudanese warlord Rabih az-Zubayr, who destroyed the al-Kanemi capital of Kukawa and instead selected Dikwa as his seat. Rabih was defeated by joint Bornoan and French forces in 1900, whereafter the French installed the al-Kanemi dynasty Sanda Kura as shehu at Dikwa. Sanda Kura proved dissatisfactory to the French colonial authorities and was soon replaced with his brother Abubakar Garbai. In 1902, Garbai accepted becoming the figurehead ruler of British Borno and left Dikwa, whereafter the entire former empire fell under colonial control. Garbai and his successors came to govern the traditional state that is today known as the Borno Emirate, ruling from Maiduguri since 1907. Garbai left Dikwa in the hands of his relative Sanda Mandarama, whose successors governed the Dikwa Emirate.

== History ==
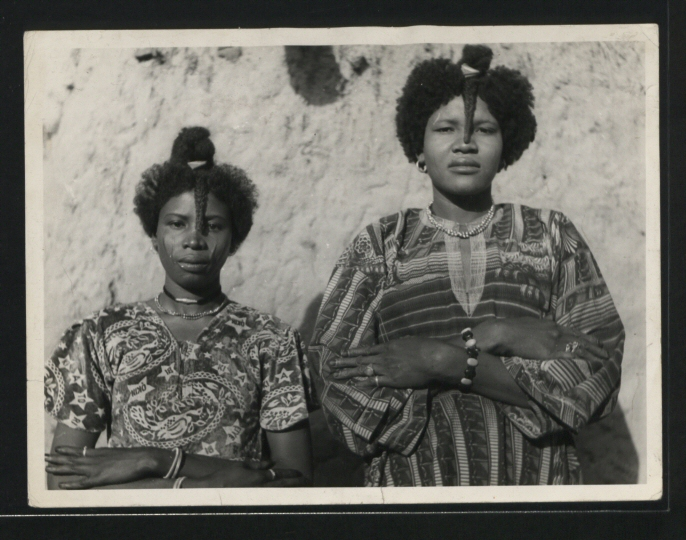
Kanuri women from the Dikwa Emirate, 1955

In 1902 Dikwa was part of the German colonial sphere of influence, under German Cameroon. The Borno and Dikwa emirates were during their initial years known as British Borno and German Borno, respectively. The German authorities confirmed Sanda Mandarama as shehu. Sanda Mandarama briefly fled to British Borno in 1905, whereafter the Germans replaced him with his brother Ibrahim, though Sanda Mandarama returned a year later and was restored to the throne.

In 1916, during World War I, Cameroon (including Dikwa) was taken over by the British and British Cameroon became a mandate under the United Nations in 1922. In 1917, Sanda Mandarama was succeeded by his nephew Sanda Kyarimi. Kyarimi dropped the title of "shehu of German Borno" in favor of "shehu of Dikwa", since both Borno and Dikwa were now under British colonial control. In 1937, Kyarimi succeeded Sanda Kura as the shehu of Borno. Kyarimi's appointment in Borno ended the line of shehus of Dikwa and for the first time since colonisation there was only one shehu.

After Kyarimi moved to Borno, the Dikwa Emirate was left as a distinct traditional state under his brother, Masta Kyarimi, though Masta and his successors were strictly referred to only as emirs or mais, not shehus. The seat of the Dikwa Emirate was moved to Bama in 1942 at the request of the British colonial administration.

In 2009, it was decided that the emirate was to be divided in two: the larger Dikwa Emirate was to retain three Local Government Areas (Dikwa, Ngala, and Kala-Balge) and a new (smaller) Bama Emirate was to be created to include the former fourth LGA (Bama). In 2010, Abba Masta II was appointed as shehu of Dikwa, the first ruler of Dikwa to be styled shehu since 1937. The then incumbent emir of Dikwa, Kyari, continued as the ruler of Bama Emirate, initially intended to continue to be styled as emir but ultimately also recognised as a shehu. Due to the Boko Haram insurgency, Abba Masta II spent much of his tenure as shehu in exile and died at Maiduguri in 2021. Abba Masta II's brother Ibrahim was appointed as his successor in January 2021 but could not be formally invested while in exile. Following successes in increasing the safety in the region around Dikwa, Ibrahim was formally crowned and invested as shehu in Dikwa on 8 February 2025.

== Rulers ==
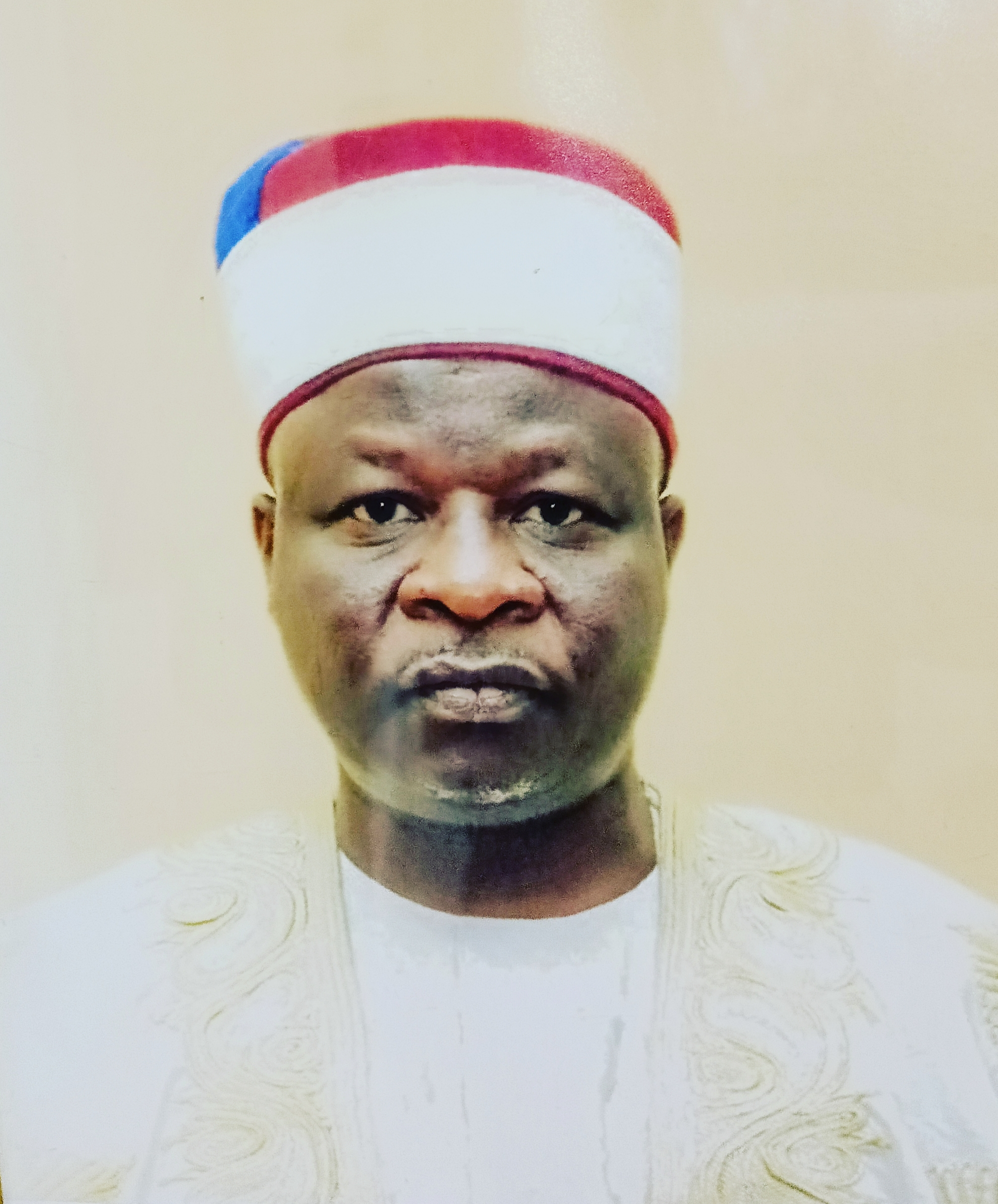
Ibrahim ibn Umar Ibrahim el-Kanemi, the 13th and incumbent shehu of Dikwa

Although Dikwa did not yet exist as an emirate distinct from Borno, the rulers of Dikwa are enumerated from 1900 onwards, with Sanda Kura and Abubakar Garbai of Borno also being considered the 1st and 2nd shehu of Dikwa, respectively. The same individual is counted twice in the enumeration if restored to the throne after having been deposed; Sanda Kiyarimi, technically the third person to hold the office of shehu of Dikwa, is for these reasons for instance counted as the 6th shehu.

No.	Name	Tenure	Succession, notes
1	Umar Sanda ibn Ibrahim Kura al-Kanemi (Sanda Kura)	1900	Pre-colonial ruler of the Kanem–Bornu Empire, counted since he had his seat at Dikwa
2	Abu Bakr ibn Ibrahim Kura al-Kanemi (Abubakar Garbai)	1900–1902	Pre-colonial ruler of the Kanem–Bornu Empire, counted since he had his seat at Dikwa
3	Umar ibn Bukar Kura al-Kanemi (Sanda Mandarama), 1st reign	1902–1905	Son of Bukar Kura (shehu of Borno 1881–1884/1885)
4	Ibrahim ibn Bukar Kura al-Kanemi	1905–1906	Son of Bukar Kura (shehu of Borno 1881–1884/1885)
5	Umar ibn Bukar Kura al-Kanemi (Sanda Mandarama), 2nd reign	1906–1917	Restored to the throne
6	Umar ibn Muhammad al-Kanemi (Sanda Kyarimi)	1917–1937	Son of Kyari (shehu of Borno 1893–1894) and grandson of Bukar Kura. Later served as shehu of Borno.
7	Masta ibn Ibrahim al-Kanemi (Masta Kyarimi)	1937–1950	Son of Kyari (shehu of Borno 1893–1894) and grandson of Bukar Kura.
8	Bukar ibn Umar al-Kanemi	1950–1952	Son of Sanda Kyarimi
9	Masta ibn Sanda Mandarama al-Kanemi (Masta III (Note: Masta ibn Sanda Mandarama's designation as "Masta III" counts Masta Gumsumi as "Masta I". Gumsumi was briefly shehu in 1900–1901 but is typically not counted among the rulers of Dikwa, despite holding Dikwa for about two months. "Masta II" is a name sometimes used for Masta Kyarimi.))	1952–1954	Son of Sanda Mandarama
10	Umar ibn Ibrahim al-Kanemi (Abba Yarema)	1954–1990	Son of Ibrahim
11	Kyari ibn Umar el-Kanemi	1990–2010	Son of Abba Yarema. Later served as shehu of Bama.
12	Abba Tor Shehu Masta el-Kanemi (Abba Masta II (Note: There is no "Abba Masta I", "Abba Masta II" refers to the fact that he was Masta II's son.))	2010–2021	Son of Masta Kiyarmi
13	Ibrahim ibn Umar Ibrahim el-Kanemi	2025–present	Son of Masta Kiyarmi. Appointed in 2021 but not formally crowned until 2025.
