= Umar ibn Abubakar Garbai al-Kanemi =

Umar

Shehu of Borno
- Reign: 27 March 1968 – 20 August 1974
- Predecessor: Sanda Kyarimi
- Successor: Mustafa
- Born: 1920; Maiduguri
- Died: 20 August 1974 (aged 53–54); Maiduguri
- Issue: See below
- Dynasty: al-Kanemi dynasty
- Father: Abubakar Garbai

Umar ibn Abubakar Garbai al-Kanemi (1920 – 20 August 1974), sometimes called Baba Yama'rambe, Sanda Kura, or Babakura, was the shehu of the Borno Emirate, a traditional state in Nigeria, from 1968 to 1974.

== Early life and career ==
Umar ibn Abubakar Garbai was the tenth and youngest son of Abubakar Garbai (shehu in 1900 and 1902–1922) and was born in Maiduguri in 1920. He was the namesake of his uncle Sanda Kura (also named Umar, shehu in 1900 and 1922–1937).

Umar began his education in Maiduguri, attending Yerwa Central Primary School in 1927–1930, the Borno Middle School in 1930–1931, and the Yerwa Adult School in 1931–1932. He was also educated in Islamic knowledge and Arabic literature by attending various local Islamic institutions. After finishing his education, Umar began working as an elementary school teacher with the Borno Native Authority om 1933. He became the first headmaster of the Kukawa Elementary School in 1937 and was later posted to the Damaturu Elementary School in 1941 and then the Yerwa Central Primary School in 1942.

Umar began an administrative career in 1943, when he was appointed as the village head of Damagum in Yobe State. He attended a local government course at the modern-day Ahmadu Bello University Zaria (then a clerical training centre) in 1952. In 1954 he travelled to Britain, where he attended local government courses at Oxford University and Lincoln College. Umar was appointed as the district head of Maiduguri, capital of the Borno Emirate, in 1957. During his tenure as district head in 1957–1968 he reportedly became very popular with the people and was known for his "positive mental attitude to life".

== Shehu of Borno ==
After the death of shehu Sanda Kyarimi, Umar was appointed as the new shehu of the Borno Emirate on 27 March 1968. The appointment came as a surprise to Umar, who did not personally learn of his new position until three hours after he had been appointed. When asked by the press, Umar stated that "I was more than surprised to hear of the news. I neither expected the appointment as I am the youngest among my six surviving brothers, I did not dream that I would be selected."

Umar worked to foster unity and solidarity among Nigeria's traditional rulers. During the early 19th century (mainly 1807–1809), the Sokoto Caliphate had nearly brought down the Kanem–Bornu Empire, the predecessor of the modern Borno Emirate. In 1972, Umar became the first reigning ruler of Borno since these wars to visit Sokoto and there met with its sultan, Siddiq Abubakar III. This visit was later considered the perhaps "most outstanding memory" of Umar's reign and a step towards solidarity between the two greatest potentates in northern Nigeria. Umar was as a consequence of the visit named locally as "man of the year".

Umar made his last public appearance on 14 August 1974, accompanying Musa Usman, governor of North-Eastern State on a trip to lay foundation stones of new houses along the road between Maiduguri and Baga.

After a brief illness, Umar died in his palace in Maiduguri in the early hours of 20 August 1974. Umar was succeeded as shehu by Sanda Kyarimi's son Mustafa, who was appointed as his successor in 1974 but not formally invested as shehu (by Musa Usman) until 1 February 1975. Mustafa commemorated Umar as a "great ruler who contributed immensely to the progress and development of Borno in particular, and the Federal Republic of Nigeria in many fields" and stated that he would be "remembered for many years to come".

== Family ==
Umar was survived by four wives, 28 children, and many grandchildren. The incumbent shehu of Borno, Abubakar, is one of Umar's sons.
