= Sanda Wuduroma =

Shehu of the Kanem–Bornu Empire
- Reign: February/March 1894
- Predecessor: Kyari
- Successor: Sanda Kura (1900)
- Died: 1894; Gashegar, Karabiri, or Dikwa, Bornu
- Dynasty: al-Kanemi dynasty
- Father: Bukar Kura

Sanda bin Abu Bakr al-Kanemi, called Sanda Wuduroma, (Note: Wuduroma is alternatively spelled Wudroma and Wudaroma.) Sanda Limanambe Wuduroma, (Note: Limanambe is alternatively spelled Limanrambe.) and Umar Sanda Wuduroma, was briefly the shehu (ruler) of the Kanem–Bornu Empire in 1894. Wuduroma ruled for only a few weeks before he was killed by the warlord Rabih az-Zubayr.

== Life ==
Sanda Wuduroma was a brother of his predecessor, shehu Kyari (r. 1893–1894), and a son of the former shehu Bukar Kura (r. 1881–1884/1885). Kyari was killed in February or March 1894, during the Sudanese warlord Rabih az-Zubayr's invasion of the Kanem–Bornu Empire. Sanda Wuduroma fled to southern Bornu, where he was proclaimed as the new shehu. Different sources give different locations for Wuduroma's proclamation as shehu, such as Utaro or Wuduro. Before he became shehu, Wuduroma was known as Abba Sanda Limanambe. The epithet Wuduroma derives from Wuduro, where he may have been proclaimed shehu.

Wuduroma continued the fight against Rabih's invasion. With the defeat of Kyari and dispersal of many members of the ruling al-Kanemi dynasty, Rabih remained in the area around Gashegar, near Lake Chad. He then traveled across western Bornu on a "demonstration tour" to pacify the region. Wuduroma hoped to exploit Rabih's absence to take Dikwa, which Rabih had selected as his capital in Bornu. Babikir, a commander left in charge of Dikwa by Rabih, made preparations to lead a force against Wuduroma but was ordered by Rabih to take up a defensive position. Instead, Rabih sent a force under the commander Gadim to engage Wuduroma.

Gadim decisively defeated Wuduroma in a skirmish. Whereas Gadim counted only four dead and seven wounded, Wuduroma counted thirty dead and a hundred wounded. Wuduroma fled the battle to Gumsuri Nyaleribe, at the northern edges of Marghi territory, where he was sheltered by the locals. Gadim sent the officer Abdurahman Mabruk to chase down Wuduroma, who was swiftly captured. At the time of his capture, Wuduroma had ruled as shehu for only a few weeks. Different sources give the location of Wuduroma's capture as Konduga or Shettima Ali Kolobe, near Damboa. Wuduroma was chained to a camel and taken to Rabih, who had him executed. The location of Wuduroma's execution is also unclear. Different sources give Gashagar, Karabiri, and Dikwa. Wuduroma's death left Rabih as the undisputed ruler of Bornu, a position he would retain for the next six years.
