= Masta Gumsumi =

Shehu of the Kanem–Bornu Empire
- Reign: December 1900 – February 1901
- Predecessor: Abubakar Garbai
- Successor: Abubakar Garbai
- Died: 1904; Dikwa, German Cameroon
- Dynasty: al-Kanemi dynasty
- Father: Umar Kura

Muhammad al-Mustafa ibn Umar al-Kanemi, called Masta Gumsumi, Manta Kura, and Abba Masta Kura, was the penultimate shehu (ruler) of the Kanem–Bornu Empire, ruling in 1900–1901. Masta Gumsumi was made shehu when his nephew Abubakar Garbai went missing in the aftermath of a battle and was deposed upon Garbai's return.

== Life ==
Masta Gumsumi was a son of shehu Umar Kura (r. 1837–1853 and 1854–1881). Masta Gumsumi emerges in the historical record in the aftermath of the defeat of the Sudanese warlord Rabih az-Zubayr, who had ruled the Kanem–Bornu Empire in 1893–1900. After Rabih's death, the shehus regained power with French support, leading to the brief reigns of Sanda Kura and Abubakar Garbai whose control of the empire was contested by Rabih's son, Fadlallah.

On 6 December 1900, forces loyal to Abubakar Garbai were defeated in Ngala by Fadlallah's forces. Garbai went missing in the battle and his whereabouts remained unknown in Bornu for two months. Lacking a ruler, refugees from the battle thus chose to appoint Masta Gumsumi, Garbai's uncle, as the new shehu. Real power was widely considered to be in the hands of the eunuch-general Mestrema Musa. Masta Gumsumi and his supporters received French support in the struggle against Fadlallah. The French general Félix Adolphe Robillot intervened in their favor and captured Dikwa from Fadlallah on 31 December.

Garbai returned to Bornu in February 1901, having taken refuge in Kanem after the battle. Masta Gumsumi fled from Dikwa upon Garbai's return and Garbai was swiftly reinstalled as shehu. Masta Gumsumi would later return to Dikwa when it was under the control of shehu Sanda Mandarama, who governed there as a figurehead under German colonial rule. Masta Gumsumi died at Dikwa in 1904, survived by many children and grandchildren.
