= Abubakar Garbai =

Shehu of Bornu in 1900 and from 1901 to 1922

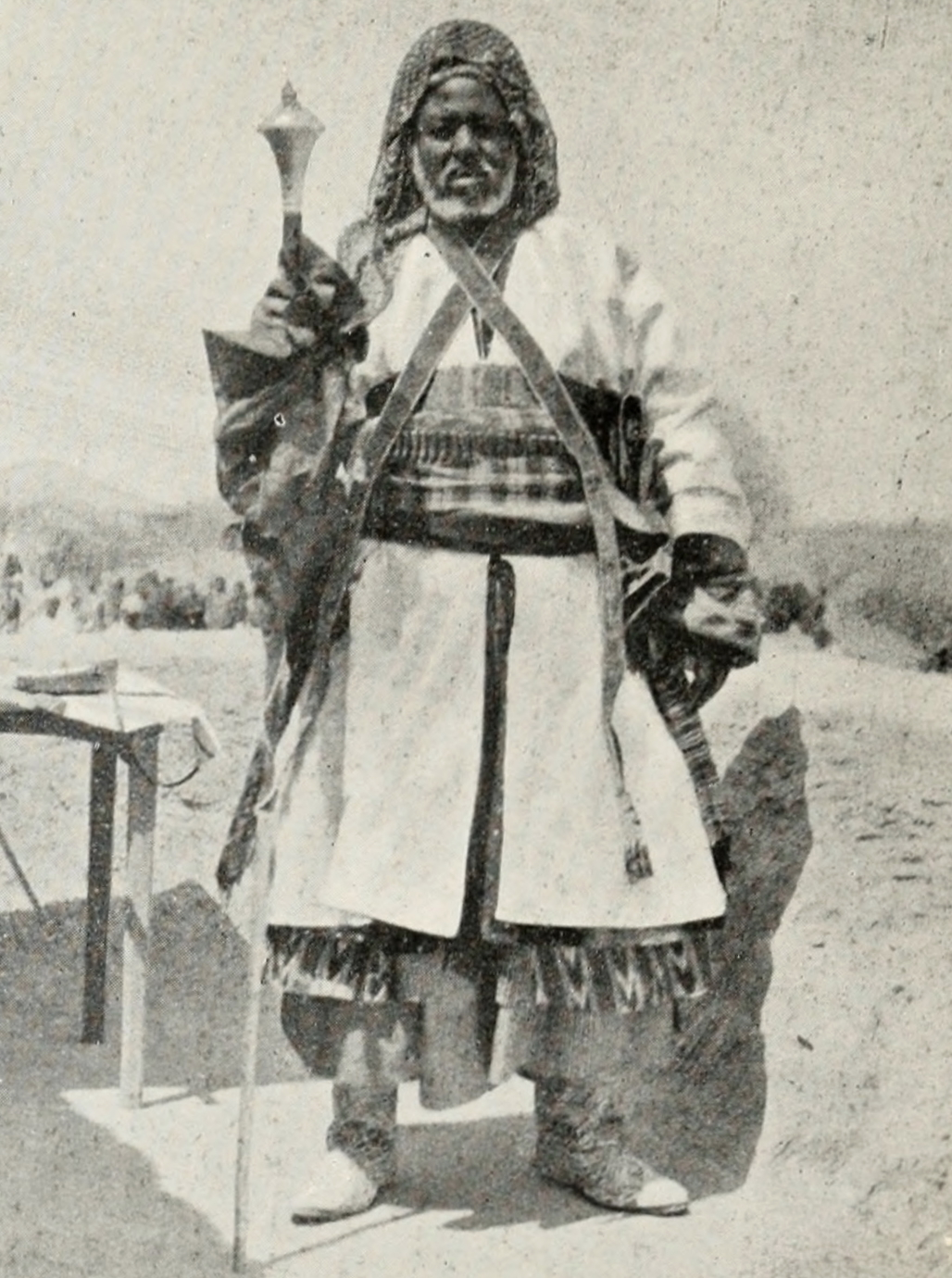
- Abubakar Garbai in 1912

Shehu of the Kanem–Bornu Empire
- 1st reign: July/August – 6 December 1900
- Predecessor: Sanda Kura
- Successor: Masta Gumsumi
- 2nd reign: February 1901 – April 1902
- Predecessor: Masta Gumsumi

Shehu of British Borno
- Reign: 2 April 1902 – 1922
- Successor: Sanda Kura
- Died: 1922; Maiduguri, Colonial Nigeria
- Issue: See below
- Dynasty: al-Kanemi dynasty
- Father: Ibrahim Kura

Abu Bakr ibn Ibrahim Kura al-Kanemi, known as Abubakar Garbai and Bukar Garbai, was the last ruler of the Kanem–Bornu Empire, ruling as shehu in 1900 and in 1901–1902. He later served as the first shehu of British Borno (the modern-day Borno Emirate), a traditional state under the British Northern Nigeria Protectorate and later Nigeria Protectorate, in 1902–1922.

Garbai was a son of Ibrahim Kura, who had ruled as shehu in 1884/1885–1885/1886 and came to power in the aftermath of French and British conflicts against the Sudanese warlord Rabih az-Zubayr, who had ruled Kanem–Bornu in 1893–1900. After Rabih's defeat, Garbai's brother Sanda Kura was made shehu by the French. Sanda Kura's rule was dissatisfactory to the French, who replaced him with Garbai in July or August 1900. Garbai's reign saw conflict with Rabih's son, Fadlallah, and came to an end as France, Britain, and Germany carved up the territories of the Kanem–Bornu Empire under their own colonial spheres of influence. In April 1902, Garbai accepted an offer to serve as the figurehead ruler of the British portion of the empire.

Garbai maintained a large degree of autonomy and power under the British, particularly in regards to tax collection and dispensation of justice. It was initially intended to rebuild the ruined old Kanem–Bornu capital of Kukawa, though this proved infeasible and Garbai instead chose Maiduguri as his seat. During World War I (1914–1918), Garbai helped the British with local support, which helped to ensure a relatively swift British victory over German troops in the region. Garbai's territory and autonomy was subsequently increased. Garbai continued to serve as shehu until his death in 1922.

== Early life ==
Abubakar Garbai was a son of Ibrahim Kura, who ruled as shehu in 1884/1885–1885/1886. The Kanem–Bornu Empire was conquered by the Sudanese warlord Rabih az-Zubayr in 1893–1894. Garbai first fled to Cross Kauwa but eventually submitted to Rabih at Dikwa.

In late 1898, Garbai joined his elder brother Sanda Kura in the struggle against Rabih. After the defeat of Rabih at the battle of Kousséri in 1900, Sanda Kura was installed with French support as Kanem–Bornu's new ruler at Dikwa, az-Zubayr's former capital. Sanda Kura agreed to French demands for monetary compensation, a large fee of 30,000 Maria Theresa dollars but was dissatisfactory to the French authorities in other ways, exhibiting notable cruelty to his former enemies and refusing French demands to drive away the Baggara Arabs.

== Ruler of the Kanem–Bornu Empire (1900–1902) ==
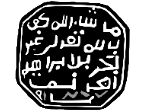
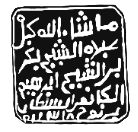
Two versions of Garbai's official seal, reading "What Allah wishes is sufficient. His servant shehu Bakr bin shehu Ibrahim al-Kanemi, sultan of Borno, year 1318" (1901).

Dissatisfied with Sanda Kura, the French withdrew their recognition of him as shehu and had him arrested and exiled. In July/August 1900, Sanda Kura was replaced as shehu with his brother Abubakar Garbai, who was considered more pliable. Garbai was installed at Dikwa and agreed to pay the remaining sum owed to the French (21,000 Maria Theresa dollars) and to drive away the Baggara Arabs.

Meanwhile, Rabih az-Zubayr's son Fadlallah tried to secure British support as ruler of Bornu. Garbai tried to assert his rule as shehu by sending an army led by the eunuch Mestrema Musa to occupy the city of Maiduguri, within the British colonial sphere of influence. Fadlallah beat Musa to Maiduguri, reaching the city on 26 November, and was able to defeat Musa's 1,500-strong army with minimal losses. Fadlallah had Maiduguri burnt and marched on Dikwa. Garbai and most of Dikwa's population fled to Ngala and Fadlallah retook the capital without opposition on 30 November. Garbai requested support from the French general Félix Adolphe Robillot but the French faced difficulties in consolidating their forces in order to face Fadlallah. Robillot advised Garbai to withdraw to securely French territory but Garbai swore to defend Ngala to his death. Fadlallah reached Ngala on 6 December, where he decisively defeated Garbai's army despite being outnumbered. In the aftermath of the battle, Garbai fled to Kanem, east of Lake Chad, where he unsuccessfully tried to enlist the protection and support of the Senussi Order. Neither the French colonial authorities or anyone in Bornu knew what had happened to Garbai. Refugees from the battle appointed Masta Gumsumi as the new shehu, though real power was in the hands of Mestrema Musa.

Robillot militarily intervened in December, reoccupying Dikwa on 31 December and pursued Fadlallah's forces until mid-January. Garbai returned in February 1901 and Masta Gumsumi fled from Dikwa. In June, Fadlallah returned again and occupied Burguma. Fadlallah's advance frightened Garbai, who temporarily abandoned Dikwa again and fled to the lands around the Chari River, seeking French protection. Fadlallah's army was engaged by French forces at Gujba on 23 August 1901, with Fadlallah killed in the ensuing battle.

British forces occupied much of Bornu in March 1902, desplite lacking a legitimate figurehead, and incorporated the lands into the Northern Nigeria Protectorate. In 1902, Garbai left Dikwa to serve as the figurehead shehu of "British Borno". British colonial sources state that the British invited Garbai to take up the position, and that he accepted this. German colonial sources from the same time instead claim that Garbai was kidnapped by British troops. Whether Garbai willingly entered British territory is not clear. Garbai was accompanied by 300 horsemen and 200 foot soldiers from his own forces (although many of these had once fought for Rabih) but also showcased some reluctance to leave Dikwa. Dikwa was left in the care of Sanda Mandarama, a brother of the former shehu Kyari, and was occupied by the French in April 1902. The French soon withdrew, with the Germans taking over Dikwa and its surroundings.

== Ruler of British Borno (1902–1922) ==
=== Initial years ===
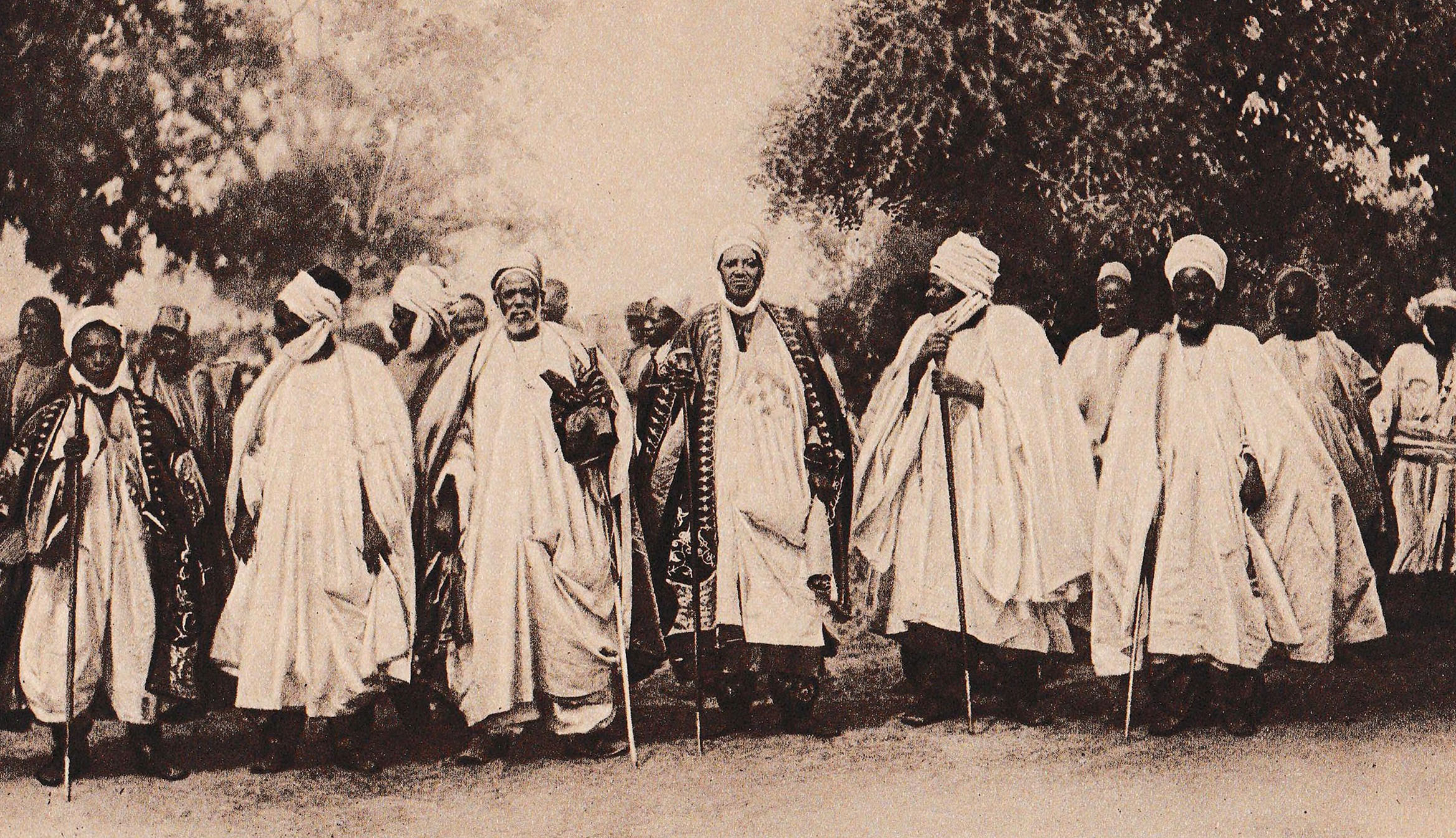
Six emirs and sultans of Northern Nigeria gathered at the Great Durbar in Kano for a 1913 New Years celebration. Garbai is the third from the left.

Through Garbai, the British could present their colonisation of Bornu as the restoration of a rightful monarch. On 2 April 1902, Abubakar Garbai was appointed as shehu of British Borno, the traditional state today referred to as the Borno Emirate. British forces were sent to retrieve the remnants of Garbai's property at Dikwa, though much of it was instead confiscated by the French. Although he was placed under British suzerainty, Garbai was able to rule highly autonomously and proclaimed that he intended to be independent of the British. Garbai continued to collect taxes in his own name and unsuccessfully tried to keep his own firearms. Garbai and many among his people seem to have initially believed that the British presence in their country was a temporary affair and that the British forces would leave in a year or two.

Garbai agreed to Thomas Morland's proposal that the former capital of Kukawa, destroyed by the Sudanese usurper Rabih az-Zubayr in 1894, would be rebuilt and serve as the shehu's seat. The British suggested that Garbai take up residence at Mafoni in the interim period, where a garrison of British soldiers were stationed. Wishing to maintain some distance to the British forces, Garbai instead selected Monguno as his temporary seat. Monguno was a large market village some 30 kilometres (19 miles) south of Kukawa. In 1903, Garbai moved his court to Kukawa. At the time, the former capital was little more than "one large cornfield" and was no longer located along any major trade routes. The site also suffered from an inadequate water supply. Garbai swore a formal oath to the British only in 1904, when he was invested as shehu among the ruins of Kukawa by Frederick Lugard. Attempts to revitalise Kukawa failed and on 9 January 1907 Garbai moved his seat to Yerwa (later called Maiduguri). Garbai ensured that the new capital was built in Kanuri fashion and that his palace dominated the settlement.

In 1907–1912, the British colonial administrator W. P. Hewby attempted to bypass Garbai when collecting taxes but this venture failed, demonstrating that the shehu retained autonomous power and influence. Garbai seems to at least sometimes have disregarded the colonial borders imposed in the region surrounding British Borno since he is recorded to have collected taxes in territories that were legally in the German sphere of influence. On 1 January 1914, Richmond Palmer confirmed Garbai as "the chief of native administration", formally establishing his autonomy when it came to legal affairs and taxation.

=== World War I ===
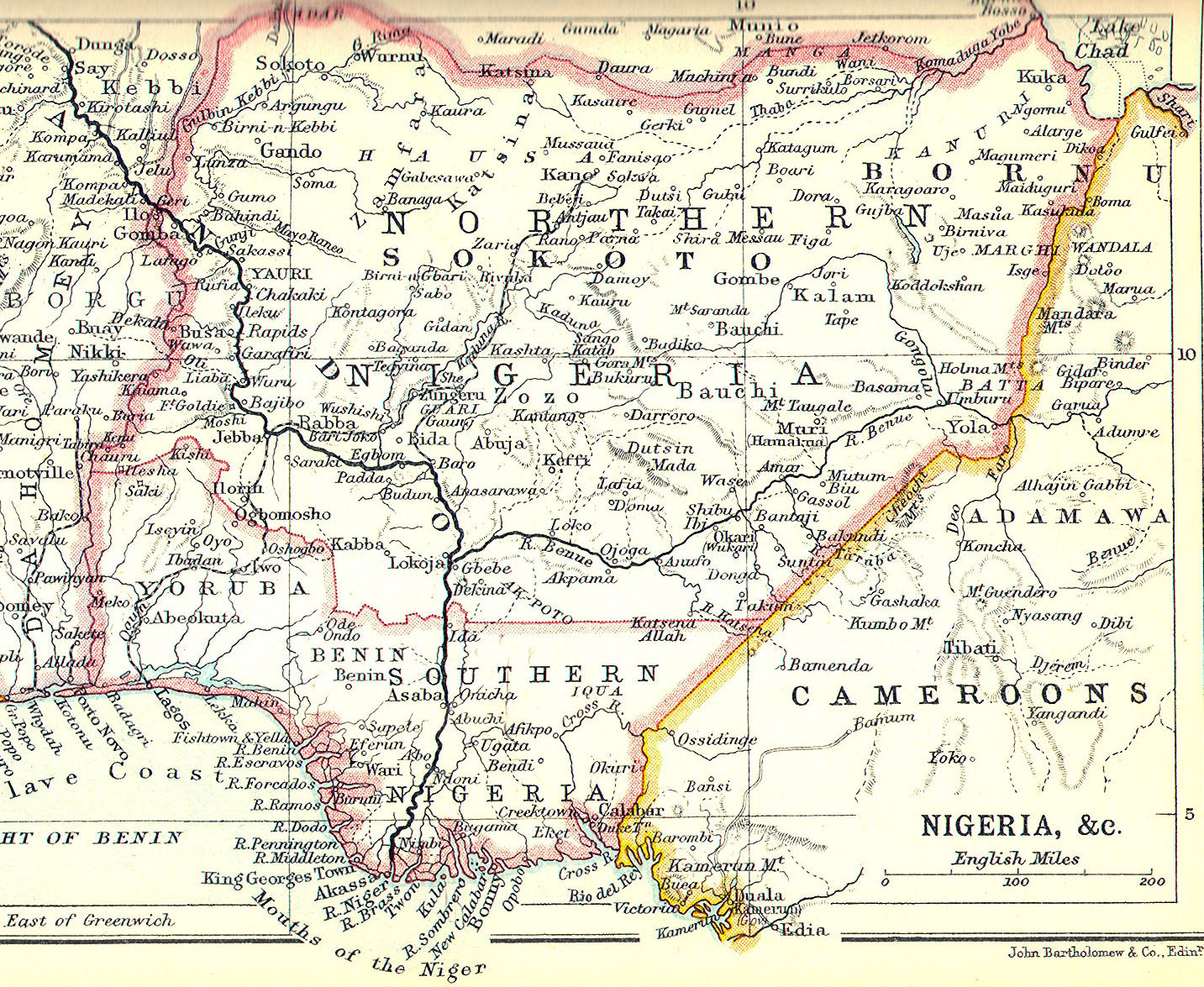
Map of Nigeria in 1914

During World War I (1914–1918), Garbai and the Bornoan elite assisted the British despite the British Empire fighting against the Ottoman Empire, the world's most powerful Muslim power. The Ottoman rulers held the position of caliph and were widely seen as the "heads of the Islamic World", though their authority as such was unrecognized and challenged at a local level in many places across the Islamic World. Borno had at times stood opposed to Ottoman interests in Africa since the 16th century, especially Ottoman efforts to establish authority in the Fezzan region and further into Central Africa. During the 19th century, relations between the Ottoman and Kanem–Bornu empires had fluctuated between cooperation and opposition. Both the Ottomans and the Bornoans were Sunni Muslims, but they adhered to different schools of Islamic jurisprudence; the Ottomans were hanafi and the Bornoans were maliki. The different schools was used as an argument by Garbai for siding with the British against the Ottomans.

Many of the British soldiers stationed in Northern Nigeria left in order to fight during the war. This development both strengthened and weakened Garbai's personal authority; Garbai was left with less oversight but many among the general populace and some among the elite stood opposed to conflict with the Ottomans. When the British presence decreased, rumors circulated in many places in Nigeria that they were leaving forever, leading to unrest in many rural areas. Several protests and riots started during the war, though their extent and motivations were poorly recorded by the colonial authorities. The German Empire, allied with the Ottomans, made use of pro-Ottoman sentiments in their local propaganda, publishing letters in Borno supposedly written by the Ottoman sultan and claiming that Germany was fighting the British to prevent "the pagans" from taking Istanbul. The British countered through messages from Hussein bin Ali, ruler of Hejaz, who opposed the Ottomans and encouraged Muslims to fight against the Triple Entente.

Garbai provided British troops with transport, mail runners, escorts, and gifts. Other regional rulers also aided the British, for instance providing military information, because of their dynastic ties to Garbai. Garbai's autonomy and power was greatly increased during the war. In response to local unrest and revolts in 1915, the British provided Garbai and his native administration with guns, arming them for the first time since colonisation had begun. Garbai's territory increased during the war as the French agreed to transfer their Bornoan territories to the British (and thus to Garbai). By siding with the British, the Bornoans further hoped to regain Bornoan territories that had fallen under the German colonial empire.

Thanks in part to local aid, British and French forces rapidly triumphed over the Germans in Borno. On 21 August 1914, the British captured Dikwa, where Sanda Mandarama opened his gates to them almost without fighting and donated weapons and ammunition. The French captured Kousséri in September and joined with the British in October, whereafter the two armies captured Maroua together in mid-December. Only Mora remained under German control, held by Ernst von Raben until February 1916. The Bornoans themselves, and most of "Borno proper" was largely undamaged by the war, with local conflict largely confined to colonial soldiers and remote territories.

=== Later reign ===
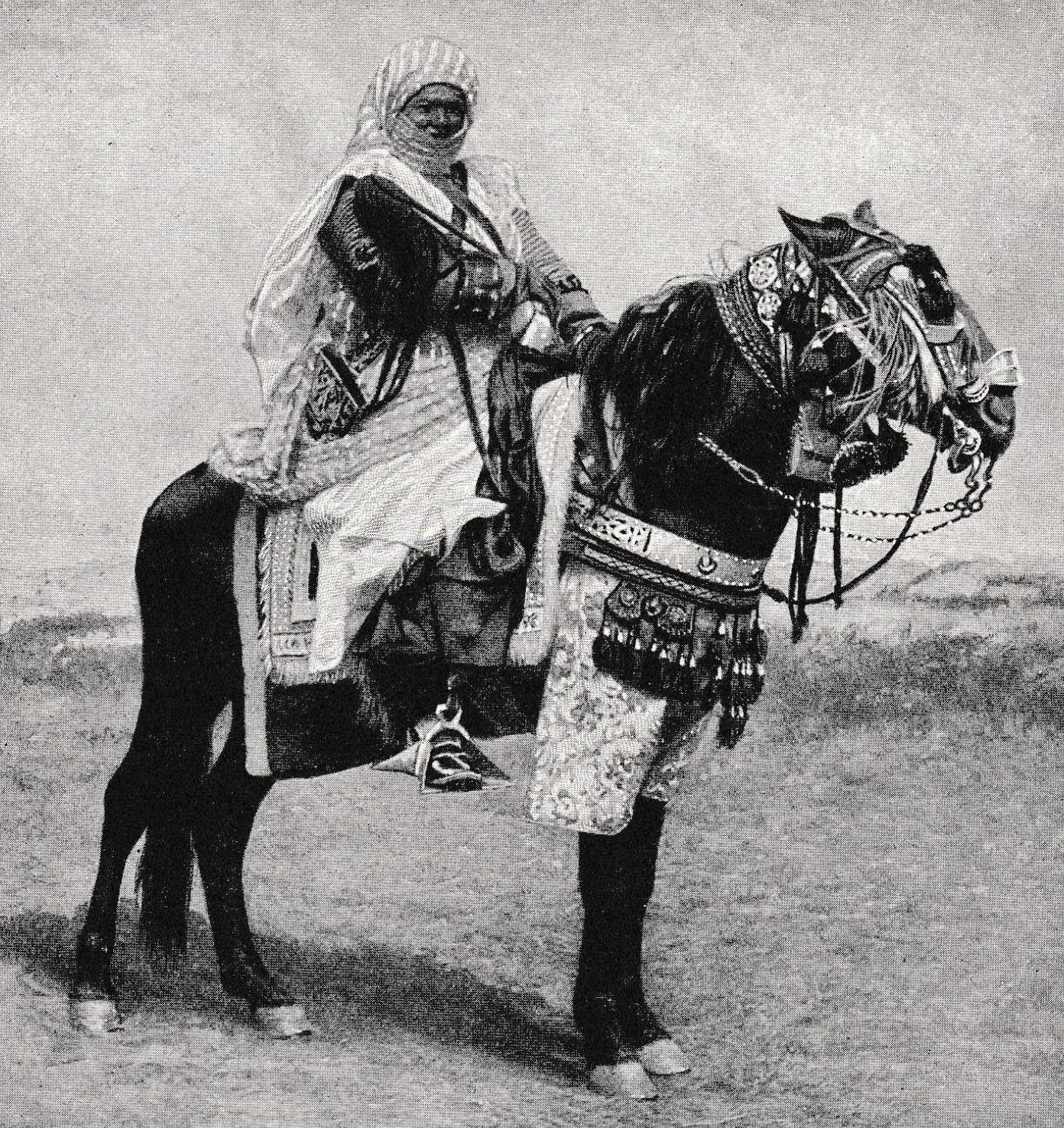
Garbai mounted on a horse, 1920

Through World War I, the German-held parts of Borno were incorporated into the British colonial empire. When Sanda Kyarimi succeeded Sanda Mandarama at Dikwa in 1917, he changed his title from "shehu of German Borno" to "shehu of Dikwa" since both parts of Borno were now under the British. In 1922, Dikwa was incorporated into the Borno Province, though Sanda Kyarimi continued to hold the title of shehu there.

Abubakar Garbai died at Maiduguri in 1922. He was succeeded as shehu by his brother Sanda Kura, who had returned to Borno fifteen years prior and had served as a district head under Garbai.

== Family ==
Abubakar Garbai left many children and grandchildren, including ten sons. Garbai's tenth and youngest son Umar, born in Maiduguri in 1920, was shehu of the Borno Emirate in 1968–1974. Umar's son (and Garbai's grandson) Abubakar ibn Umar Garba el-Kanemi is the incumbent shehu of the Borno Emirate, ruling since 2009.
