= Ibrahim Kura =

Shehu of the Kanem–Bornu Empire
- Reign: 1884/1885–1885/1886
- Predecessor: Bukar Kura
- Successor: Ashimi
- Died: Between October 1885 and February 1886; Kukawa, Bornu
- Issue: Sanda Kura; Abubakar Garbai
- Dynasty: al-Kanemi dynasty
- Father: Umar Kura

Ibrahim bin Umar al-Kanemi, called Ibrahim Kura, was the shehu (ruler) of the Kanem–Bornu Empire in 1884–1885 or 1885–1886. Ibrahim seized the throne in a coup d'état after the death of his brother, Bukar Kura, and his short one-year reign was a time of uninterrupted political and economic crisis.

== Accession ==
Ibrahim Kura was a brother of his predecessor, shehu Bukar Kura (r. 1881–1884/1885), and a son of the former shehu Umar Kura (r. 1837–1853; 1854–1881). Bukar Kura died prematurely and unexpectedly at some point between November 1884 and February/March 1885. There was no agreed upon heir to the throne upon Bukar Kura's death since the shehu had not designated an heir and no al-Kanemi dynast had taken time to build up a following of supporters. The four most plausible contenders for the throne were Bukar Kura's young son Kyari, his younger brothers Ibrahim and Ashimi, and his uncle Masta Kura. The norm was that the eldest son or next youngest brother succeeded, in this case Kyari or Ibrahim. Kyari was not influential enough to press his claim but Ibrahim was not favored at court. It was well known that Ibrahim held animosity for Bukar Kura, which meant that many of Bukar Kura's former courtiers feared Ibrahim's potential rise to the throne. Ibrahim's closest companion, Momman Tahr, was also widely considered disagreeable and difficult to work with.

The courtiers chose Masta Kura to be Bukar Kura's successor. Although Masta Kura was perfectly legitimate, the throne passing to an uncle was irregular. Ibrahim refused to accept his uncle's appointment and bribed the slave riflemen in Kukawa (the capital) to back him instead. With the riflemen at his back, Ibrahim successfully demanded courtiers and religious leaders to install him as shehu instead. Masta Kura refused to accept Ibrahim's accession and fled from the capital with his family and followers. Ibrahim tried to resolve the succession conflict by sending a delegation of religious officials to persuade Masta Kura to submit in peace. Masta Kura instead attacked Ibrahim's camp and was killed in a brief skirmish.

== Reign ==
Ibrahim's short reign has been characterized as "one uninterrupted political crisis", which was compounded by an economic crisis that began in Bukar Kura's reign. The Kanem–Bornu Empire also experienced a famine in Ibrahim's time.

Ibrahim and Momman Tahr, who was appointed as waziri (vizier), worked to reorganise the imperial court and rearrange its power structure, realising the fears many courtiers had felt concerning Ibrahim's rise to the throne. Several slave officials and generals were fired and replaced, though this move had little ramifications since slaves had no means or rights to protect their claims. Of greater concern was that Ibrahim also took actions against the aristocracy. On Ibrahim's orders, Tahr took over a compound belonging to the courtier Abba Beddowai bin al-Hajj Bashir by force, forcing Beddowai's staff to flee by breaking a hole in the wall, simply so that Tahr could live closer to the palace. Rumors that Ibrahim was going to remove the courtier Shettima Kanuri Mala, a former close advisor to Bukar Kura, and appoint and unrelated official to Mala's position, were met with resistance at court. When Mala died mysteriously soon thereafter, and many of his fiefs and much of his property were confiscated by Ibrahim, many at court suspected that Shettima had been assassinated on Ibrahim's orders. Ibrahim reportedly also had plans to assassinate his nephew Kyari, who Ibrahim considered to be his main political rival.

The manner in which the imperial court was treated by Ibrahim and Tahr inspired much discontent in Kukawa. In order to silence the opposition, Ibrahim began to plot to have several prominent courtiers killed, including four of Kukawa's leading mallams (priests), his cousin Abana Laminu, and his uncle Abba Anas. On the intended day of these murders, Ibrahim experienced a violent vomit attack when he was going to mount his horse and then died in the night. Although Ibrahim's death was convenient and timely for many who opposed him, there is no evidence that he was murdered. It is unclear when exactly Ibrahim died. Surviving documents make it clear that Ibrahim was still ruling in mid-October 1885 and that his successor, Ashimi, was in power by February 1886.

== Family ==
Ibrahim Kura had a large family, including about thirty sons. He was the father of the two later shehus Sanda Kura and Abubakar Garbai.
