= Borno Emirate =

Borno Emirate Borno, Bornu
- Traditional state
- Location within Nigeria
- Coordinates: 11°50′N 13°09′E
- Country: Nigeria
- State: Borno State
- Founded: 1902
- Seat: Monguno (1902–1903); Kukawa (1903–1907); Maiduguri (1907–present)

Government
  - Shehu: Abubakar ibn Umar Garba el-Kanemi

The Borno Emirate, also known as the Borno Sultanate or Bornu Emirate, is a traditional state located in Borno State, Nigeria. The emirate is a remnant of the regime of the old Kanem–Bornu Empire, ruled by dynasts of the final Bornoan ruling dynasty (the al-Kanemi dynasty). The rulers of the Borno Emirate serve as ceremonial leaders, preserving political and cultural continuity with the old empire. They have continued to be styled as the shehus of Borno, continuing an imperial line established by Muhammad al-Amin al-Kanemi in the early 19th century.

The Borno Emirate encompasses fifteen Local Government Areas (Abadam, Chibok, Gubio, Guzamala, Jere, Kaga, Konduga, Kukawa, Mafa, Magumeri, Maiduguri, Marte, Mobbar, Monguno, and Nganzai).

== Background ==
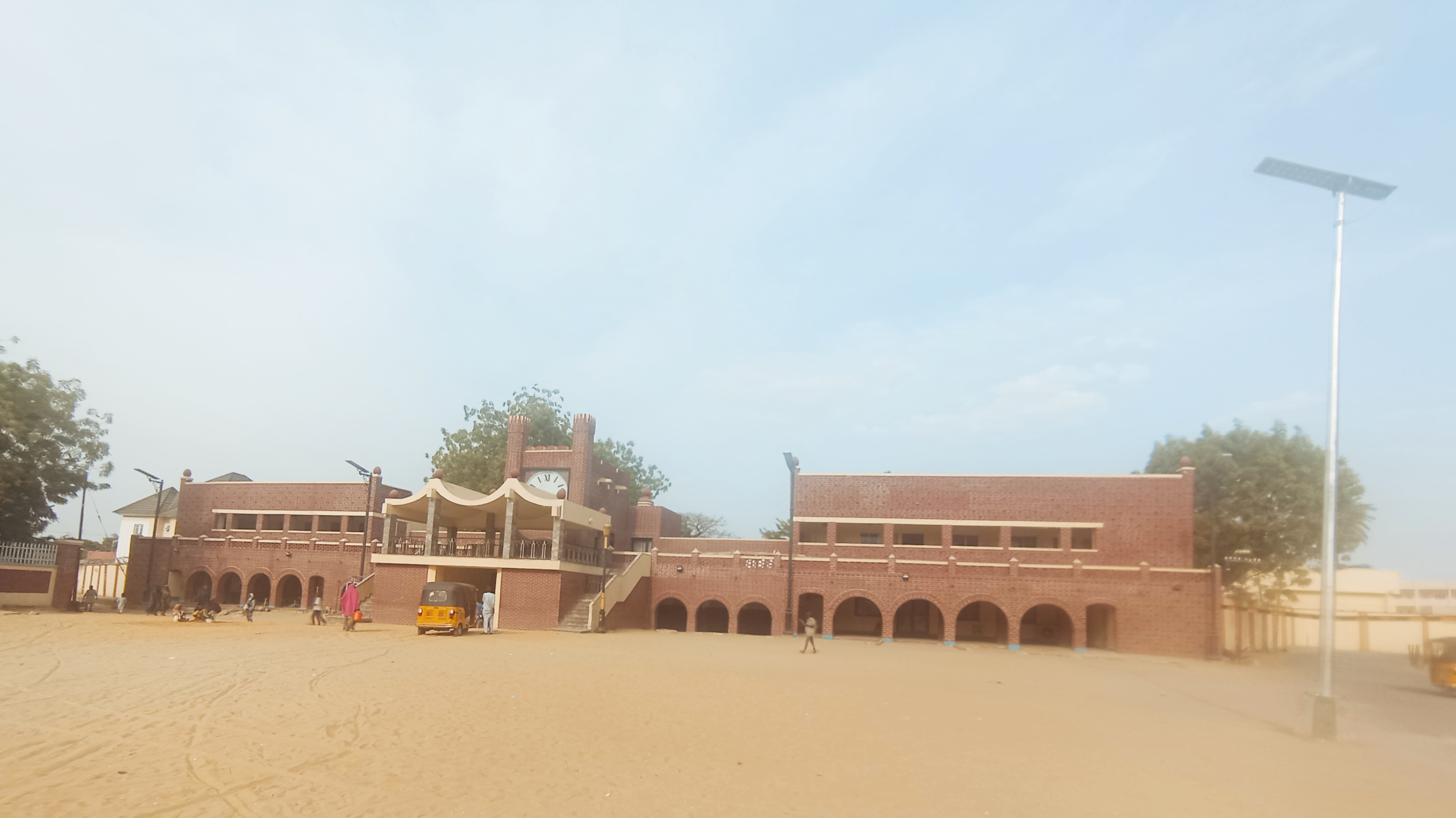
Palace of the shehu of Borno

The al-Kanemi dynasty traces its rule to the early 19th century, when Muhammad al-Amin al-Kanemi (r. 1814–1837) and his son Umar Kura (r. 1837–1881) supplanted the previous ruling lineage of the Kanem–Bornu Empire, the mais of the Sayfawa dynasty.

In 1893–1894, the empire was conquered by the Sudanese warlord Rabih az-Zubayr, who destroyed the al-Kanemi capital of Kukawa and instead selected Dikwa as his seat. Rabih was defeated by joint Bornoan and French forces in 1900, whereafter the French installed the al-Kanemi dynasty Sanda Kura as shehu at Dikwa. Sanda Kura proved dissatisfactory to the French colonial authorities and was soon replaced with his brother Abubakar Garbai.

In 1902, Abubakar Garbai accepted becoming the figurehead ruler of British Borno and left Dikwa, whereafter the entire former empire fell under colonial control. Garbai and his successors came to govern the traditional state that is today known as the Borno Emirate, ruling from Maiduguri since 1907. Garbai left Dikwa in the hands of his relative Sanda Mandarama, whose successors governed the Dikwa Emirate.

== Rulers ==
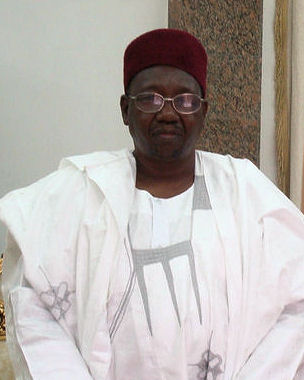
Abubakar ibn Umar Garba el-Kanemi, the 20th and incumbent shehu of Borno

No.	Name	Tenure	Succession, notes
15 (Note: The numbering of the shehus of Borno continues the enumeration of the shehus who ruled the Kanem–Bornu Empire. See the List of shehus of Bornu for details.)	Abu Bakr ibn Ibrahim Kura al-Kanemi (Abubakar Garbai)	1902–1922	Last sovereign of the Kanem–Bornu Empire before 1902
16	Umar Sanda ibn Ibrahim Kura al-Kanemi (Sanda Kura)	1922–1937	Brother of Abubakar Garbai, previously sovereign shehu in 1900
17	Umar ibn Muhammad al-Kanemi (Sanda Kyarimi)	1937–1968	Son of Kyari (shehu of Borno 1893–1894)
18	Umar ibn Abubakar Garbai al-Kanemi	1968–1974	Son of Abubakar Garbai
19	Mustafa ibn Umar el-Kanemi	1975–2009	Son of Sanda Kyarimi
20	Abubakar ibn Umar Garba el-Kanemi	2009–present	Son of Umar ibn Abubakar Garbai al-Kanemi
