= Ibrahim Mohammed Bukar =

Nigerian politician

Member of the House of Representatives
- Incumbent
- Assumed office 2019
- Preceded by: Mahmud Lawan Maina
- Constituency: Dikwa/Mafa/Konduga Federal Constituency

Personal details
- Born: 29 January 1969 (age 57) Borno State, Nigeria
- Party: All Progressives Congress
- Occupation: Politician

Ibrahim Mohammed Bukar is a Nigerian politician currently serving as a member representing Dikwa/Mafa/Konduga Federal Constituency in the House of Representatives. Born on 29 January 1969, he hails from Borno State and holds a bachelor's degree. He succeeded Mahmud Lawan Maina and was elected in 2019 to the National Assembly under the All Progressives Congress (APC). He was re-elected in 2023 for a second term. From 2011 to 2014, he served as Commissioner of Works and Transport.
