= Mustapha Bukar =

Nigerian politician

Senator
- Constituency: Katsina North

Personal details
- Born: 1955 Katsina State, Nigeria
- Died: April 2018 (aged 62–63) Abuja, Nigeria
- Party: All Progressives Congress (APC)
- Occupation: Politician

Mustapha Bukar was a Nigerian politician who represented the Katsina North constituency as a senator in the National Assembly under the platform of the All Progressives Congress (APC). He died in April 2018 at the age of 63 at a private hospital in the Federal Capital Territory, Abuja.
