= North-Eastern State =

Former state of Nigeria

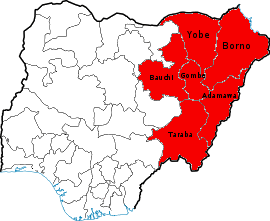
Northeastern State, with the successor states named.

North-Eastern State is a former administrative division of Nigeria. It was created on 27 May 1967 from parts of the Northern Region. Its capital was the city of Maiduguri.

On 3 February 1976, two states were carved out of North-Eastern state, namely Bauchi state and Gongola state, and the remaining portion of the North-Eastern state was renamed to Borno state. The North-Eastern state was divided into Bauchi, Borno and Gongola states. Gombe State was later split out of Bauchi, Yobe State from Borno and Gongola was split into Taraba State and Adamawa State.

== North-Eastern State Governors ==
- Musa Usman (28 May 1967 – July 1975)
- Muhammadu Buhari (July 1975 – February 1976)
