= Sanda Kyarimi =

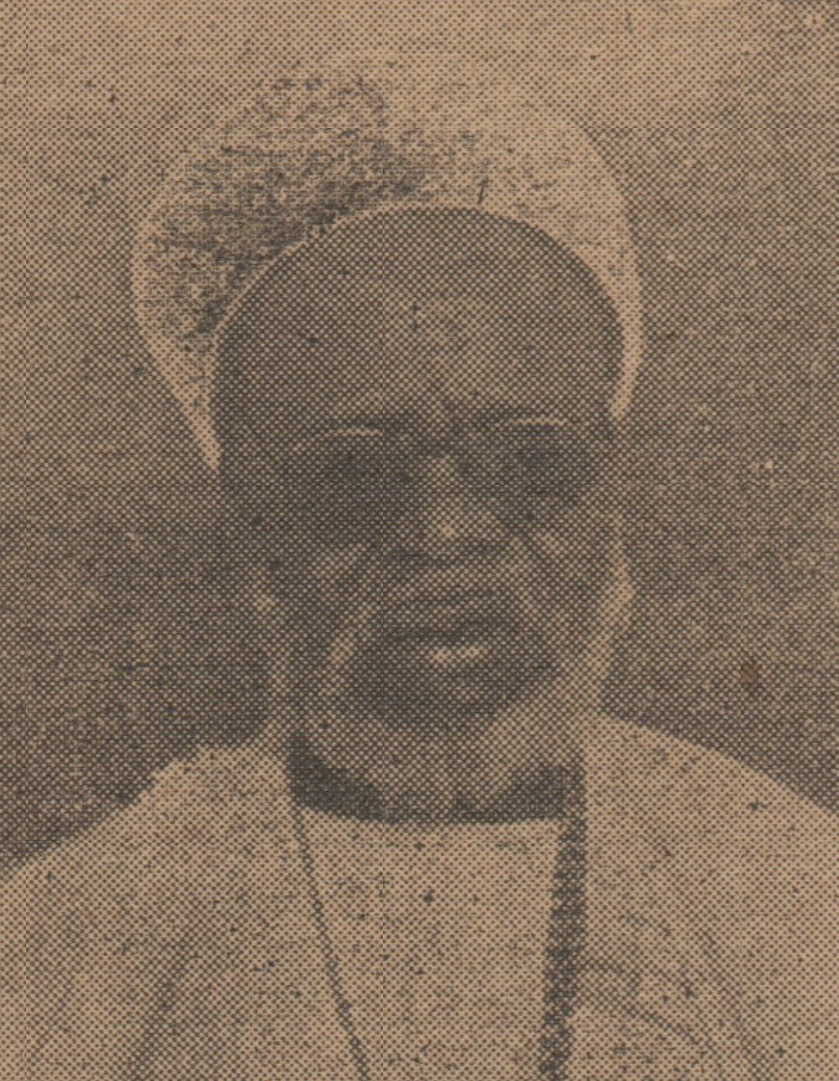
- Sanda Kyarimi in 1948

Shehu of Borno
- Reign: 25 May 1937 – 29 December 1967
- Predecessor: Sanda Kura
- Successor: Umar

Shehu of Dikwa
- Reign: 1917 – 25 May 1937
- Predecessor: Sanda Mandarama
- Successor: Masta Kyarimi
- Born: 1872; Kukawa, Kanem–Bornu Empire
- Died: 29 December 1967 (aged 95); Maiduguri, Nigeria
- Dynasty: al-Kanemi dynasty
- Father: Kyari

Sir Umar ibn Muhammad al-Kanemi KBE (1872 – 29 December 1967), known as Sanda Kyarimi, Sanda Kiarimi, or just Sanda, was the shehu of the Borno Emirate, a traditional state in Nigeria, from 1937 to 1967. He previously served as the shehu of the Dikwa Emirate, another traditional state, from 1917 to 1937.

== Early life and career ==
Umar ibn Muhammad al-Kanemi was the eldest son of Kyari (shehu 1893–1894) and was born in Kukawa in 1872. He was the namesake of his great-grandfather Umar Kura (shehu 1837–1853 and 1854–1881). Sanda Kyarimi grew up in the precolonial Kanem–Bornu Empire. His early life was largely spent in the palace of the shehus at Kukawa, where he received an Islamic education and was trained in administration and government.

Somewhat unusually for a prince, Kyarimi was at no point granted a fief to govern. Instead, he and his father trained as soldiers, participating in the defense of the empire and sometimes leading forces against rebels. In 1893, the empire was invaded by the Sudanese warlord Rabih az-Zubayr. Shehu Ashimi was defeated in battle in August 1893 and abandoned Kukawa to Rabih's forces. In November/December, Kyarimi's father Kyari seized power as the new shehu but defeated and executed by Rabih in February/March 1894. Rabih soon secured his position as the new ruler of the empire, with his seat at Dikwa.

Kyarimi was 21 years old when his father was killed. Kyarimi fled after his father's death, escaping to Mora (in modern-day Cameroon) and living there for some time in exile until captured by Rabih's forces. In 1895, Kyarimi became a soldier in Rabih's army; it is unclear if he did so willingly or was forced to as a prisoner. Kyarimi fought under Rabih for five years, until Rabih was killed at the battle of Kousséri in 1900. After Rabih's death, Kyarimi denounced Rabih's heir Fadlallah and instead aligned himself with Sanda Kura, an al-Kanemi dynast installed as the new shehu at Dikwa with French support.

From Sanda Kura's appointment onwards, Kyarimi lived at Dikwa. Under shehu Sanda Mandarama he was appointed as a local administrator and reportedly demonstrated effectiveness in this role.

== Shehu of Dikwa ==
In 1917, Sanda Kyarimi succeeded Sanda Mandarama as the shehu of German Borno (the modern-day Dikwa Emirate). Kyarimi altered his title to "shehu of Dikwa" since both "British Borno" (the modern-day Borno Emirate) and Dikwa had been under British control since the year prior.

As shehu of Dikwa, Kyarimi ruled with great generosity, especially to the poor. Dikwa nevertheless experienced much hardship during Kyarimi's time as shehu. There were a series of devastating locust plagues in the 1930s, so severe that they were compared to the occupation of Rabih az-Zubayr. In 1935, a group of mounted bandits led by a man referred to as "the man on the white horse" conducted a series of daylight abductions of young children.

== Shehu of Borno ==
The shehu of Borno, Sanda Kura, died in the middle of 1937. The British colonial administration had to choose Sanda Kura's successor from within the al-Kanemi dynasty and the choice quickly fell on Sanda Kyarimi, who was appointed shehu of Borno by Governor Bernard Henry Bourdillon on 25 May 1937. Kyarimi had a good relationship with the British and his appointment had been planned for some time; he was widely seen by the Bornoans themselves as the obvious heir, at least as far back as the 1930s, and both the Bornoans and the British found it desirable to reunify the territories of Borno and Dikwa, divided since 1902. When Kyarimi left Dikwa for Maiduguri, the Borno capital, in 1937, Dikwa was left under the rule of Kyarimi's brother Masta Kyarimi. Masta governed the territory as emir, not shehu, and was thus explicitly junior in status and authority.

The British colonial administration found Kyarimi's rule as shehu of Borno to be satisfactory. To consolidate his rule, Kyarimi began his reign at Maiduguri by allowing those of his other relatives with strong claims to the throne to keep their political positions, and gave appointments to those of his relatives who did not hold office. As shehu of Borno, Kyarimi is remembered for exemplary leadership, just rule, and hard work quality. He is further remembered for his calmness, simplicity, and deep religious conviction.

In 1955, Kyarimi attended the great durbar in Kaduna during the visit of Elizabeth II. The same year, he went on pilgrimage to Mecca.

Sanda Kyarimi died in Maiduguri on 29 December 1967, aged 95. He was succeeded as shehu by Umar ibn Abubakar Garbai al-Kanemi.

== Decorations ==
In 1943, Kyarimi was appointed CBE (Commander of the Order of the British Empire), on the nomination of Bernard Henry Bourdillon. In 1949, he was made CMG (Companion of the Order of Saint Michael and Saint George), on the recommendation of Commissioner Patterson. Finally, in 1960, the governor of Northern Nigeria, Gawain Bell recommended him for appointment as a Knight Commander of the Order of the British Empire, so that he became Sir Umar. In 1964, the Nigerian Government appointed him Grand Commander of the Order of the Niger (GCON).
