= Sanda Kura =

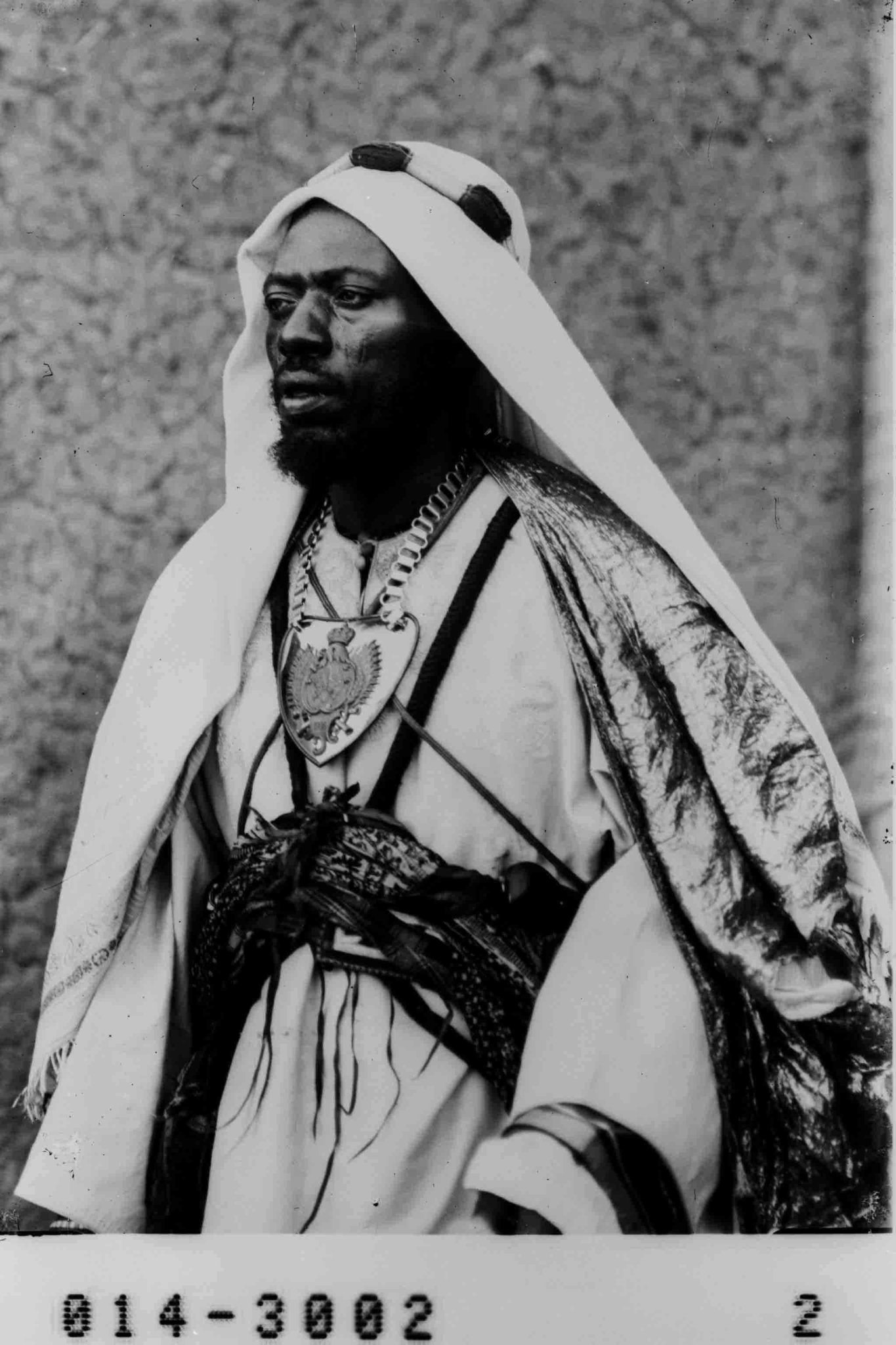
- Sanda Kura, wearing the ring collar of a European uniform. Photograph likely taken in 1900 after the defeat of Rabih az-Zubayr.

Shehu of the Kanem–Bornu Empire
- Reign: 14 January – July/August 1900
- Predecessor: Sanda Wuduroma (1894)
- Successor: Abubakar Garbai

Shehu of Borno
- Reign: 1922–1937
- Predecessor: Abubakar Garbai
- Successor: Sanda Kyarimi
- Born: 1842
- Died: 1937 (aged 94–95)
- Dynasty: al-Kanemi dynasty
- Father: Ibrahim Kura

Umar Sanda ibn Ibrahim Kura al-Kanemi (1842–1937), known as Sanda Kura or Sanda Kori, was shehu (ruler) of the Kanem–Bornu Empire for a few months in 1900, taking power with French support after the defeat of the warlord Rabih az-Zubayr (who had ruled the empire as emir in 1893–1900). Sanda Kura was deposed by the French after a brief reign and replaced with his brother Abubakar Garbai, under whom what remained of Kanem–Bornu was incorporated into the French and British colonial empires.

Sanda Kura later served as the shehu of the Borno Emirate, a traditional state under the British Nigeria Protectorate, from 1922 to 1937.

== Life ==
=== Claimant to the throne ===
Sanda Kura was born in 1842 and was a son of Ibrahim Kura, who ruled as shehu in 1884/1885–1885/1886.

In 1893, the al-Kanemi dynasty were removed from power in Bornu due to the invasion of the Sudanese warlord Rabih az-Zubayr, the first time the Kanem–Bornu Empire had come under foreign domination. After the defeat and execution of shehu Kyari by Rabih in 1894, members of the al-Kanemi dynasty fled all over the region. Some fled to the Kano emirate, others to Damagaram and a few went into hiding inside metropolitan Borno itself. Sanda Kura initially fled to Zinder and later became the leader of the resistance group in Damgaram, the largest and most important of these groups.

As early as February 1898, the Royal Niger Company reported finding Sanda Kura with 670 of his followers along the border of Damagaram. The British, who were trying to cooperate with Rabih instead, ignored Sanda Kura's request for military assistance. Sanda Kura's brother Abubakar Garbai later joined him sometime around late 1898.

By the time French forces came into contact with surviving princes of the al-Kanemi dynasties, the al-Kanemi loyalists had already regrouped under Sanda Kura as their recognised claimant. When Sanda Kura met the French Foureau–Lamy Mission in Begra, he formally asked the French to recognise him as the ruler of Bornu. The French accepted his request as they thought it was a good bargain after witnessing the deep respect and love the Bornu people had for Sanda Kura. The French were by this point already at war with Rabih, who had executed the French explorer Ferdinand de Béhagle in 1899. According to Fernand Foureau, all the local dignitaries in the city of Begra came to welcome the French expedition, bringing foodstuff and expressing hope that the French would be successful in ending Rabih's reign. Sanda Kura was formally recognised as the shehu of Bornu on 14 January 1900 in front of a huge jubilant crowd.

=== Battle of Kousséri and installation at Dikwa ===
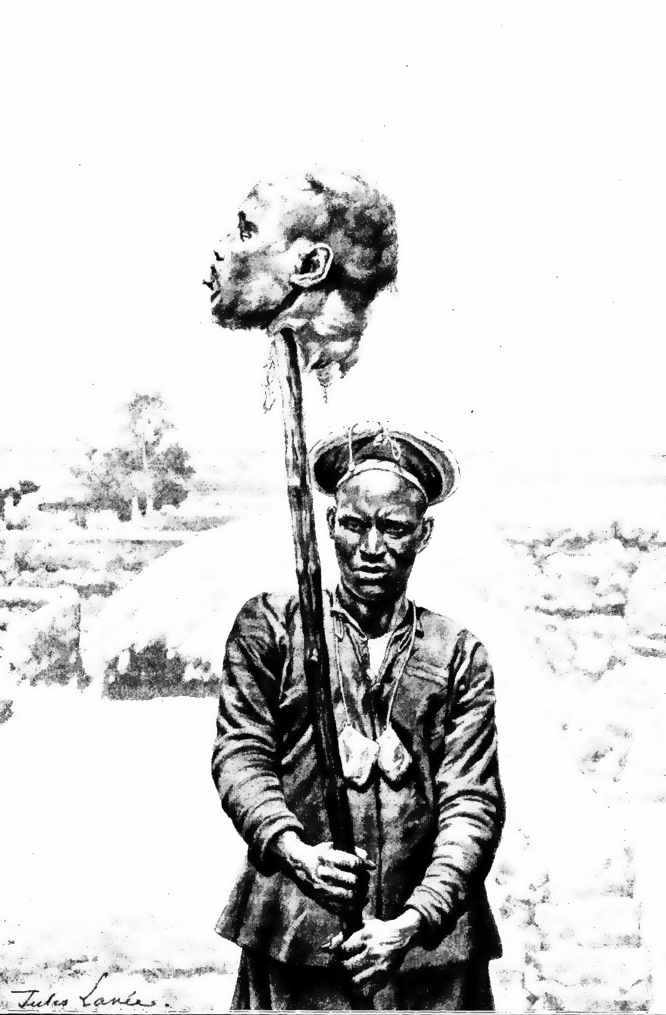
The severed head of Rabih az-Zubayr

By April 1900, the French had gathered their troops in Kanem ready to march to Dikwa (Rabih's capital) to face Rabih. Officer Émile Gentil realised that Dikwa was in "German Borno" rather than "French Borno", based upon the agreed upon European spheres of influence in Africa. This meant that marching to Dikwa would mean violating international convention. To get a legal reason for the invasion, Gentil made Gaourang II of Bagirmi write a letter to Sanda Kura, asking for assistance against Rabih's aggression in Bagirmi. The shehu was then instructed to reply back acknowledging his distress as legitimate. Sanda Kura then authorised Gaourang to join his forces and his allies in Bornu so they could all launch an attack on Rabih in Dikwa. With this "legal" reason, the French alongside the shehu's and Gaourang's forces launched an attack on Rabih and killed him in battle on 22 April 1900 at Kousséri. In the aftermath of the battle, Sanda Kura came into conflict with Gaourang; Gaourang pillaged the surrounding (Bornuan) territory, seized all Bornuan prisoners taken in the battle for himself, and repeatedly emphasized his own power and Sanda Kura's weakness.

Rabih's son, Fadlallah collected his family and property at Dikwa and then retreated south with an army. On 30 April, the French occupied Dikwa and installed Sanda Kura as Bornu's ruler there. French pursuit of Fadlallah's forces was delayed by a massive explosion in the armory of Dikwa, perhaps rigged by Fadlallah's supporters. Dikwa was abandoned on 16 May, with French forces and Sanda Kura moving back to Kousséri and then to the newly founded Fort-Lamy (modern-day N'Djamena). On 5 June, Émile Gentil and Sanda Kura travelled to Dikwa, where Sanda Kura was again settled in Rabih's former royal palace. Gentil was much impressed with the city but his opinion of Sanda Kura soured over the course of his stay, especially as Sanda Kura's confidence grew as former subjects of the shehus came to proclaim their loyalty. Gentil later wrote that "any comparison between Rabih and his successors is bound to reflect well upon the former. No more cruel than they, Rabih at least was brave, a quality utterly absent in the latter."

=== Fall from power ===
Sanda Kura faced the difficult task of restoring the authority of the office of shehu and he proved to be cruel, arbitrary, and vengeful. Many former officeholders had served Rabih after 1893 and were imprisoned when they came to pay allegiance to the new shehu; some of them died in prison. Any of Rabih's commanders and officials that fell into Sanda Kura's hands were punished. A general named Bishara, who had fought with Rabih at Kousséri and been incapacitated by his wounds, was strangled and Bishara's daughter was murdered. Any Bornuan prisoners held by the French were given to Sanda Kura. Female prisoners were used by Sanda Kura to reward loyal leading officials. Commoners and ordinary soldiers received no compensation for their loyalty and instead faced greater demands since Sanda Kura had to increase taxation to meet French demands.

The French demanded the fee of 30,000 Maria Theresa dollars from the shehu as payment for his restoration. Sanda Kura, either out of gratitude or fear, sent agents all over Bornu to gather the sum requested and was able to raise 9,000 Maria Theresa dollars. The shehu had been forced to stoop to direct extortion of payments from people since the empire's former administrative system was in disarray. The French further asked the Shehu to drive away the Baggara Arabs, living west of Lake Chad, into Kanem (east of Lake Chad). Such a forced migration was deeply unpopular among the people. It is speculated that the shehu was bitter against the Baggara; many of them had defected to Rabih in 1893 and even now continued to support Fadlallah. Despite this bitterness, the shehu recognised the importance of the Baggara to Bornu as they owned vasts amount of wealth and cattle. Sanda Kura thus refused to drive them away.

Although the overthrow of Rabih had been welcomed by the people at first, there was now mounting dissatisfaction with Sanda Kura's rule, even in Dikwa itself. The French were deeply dissatisfied with Sanda Kura, considering him cruel and noncompliant. There were rumors that Sanda Kura had ordered a mallam (traveling Islamic teacher) to prepare charms to cause Gentil's death. There were public prayers in Dikwa for the French, who were routinely referred to as infidels, to leave the empire. When Sanda Kura sent his officials to collect taxes in an area the French considered to be under their own direct rule, Sanda Kura was recalled to Fort-Lamy. The French general Félix Adolphe Robillot placed Sanda Kura and his brother Ahmad Rufai under arrest. Sanda Kura was formally deposed in July/August 1900 and was then exiled to the Congo in October 1900. Sanda Kura's brother Abubakar Garbai was made the new shehu and in return agreed to French demands to drive away the Baggara Arabs and to raise the remainder of the 30,000 Maria Theresa dollars.

=== Later life ===
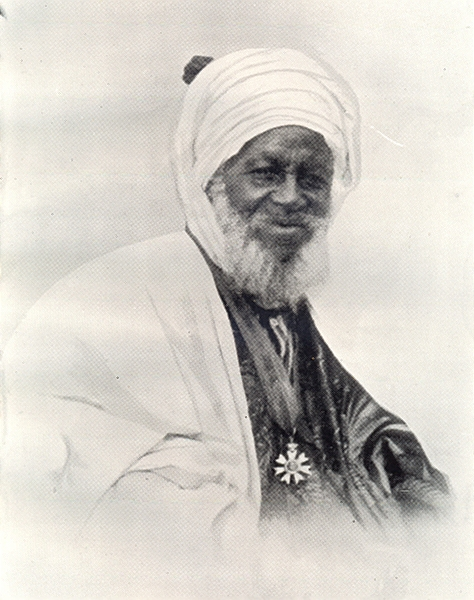
Sanda Kura in 1936

Under Abubakar Garbai, the remaining territories of the Kanem–Bornu Empire were incorporated into the French and British colonial empires, though the al-Kanemi dynasty was allowed to continue to rule without any real power as shehus of the Borno Emirate and Dikwa Emirate, under colonial authority. Due to his installation at Dikwa, Sanda Kura is retroactively considered to have been the first shehu of Dikwa in 1900, in addition to having been shehu of Borno. These offices were however not distinct in his time as ruler.

Sanda Kura returned to Borno in 1907 and served as a ajia (district head) in Maiduguri under Abubakar Garbai. In 1922, Sanda Kura succeeded Abubakar Garbai as the shehu of the Borno Emirate. He was 80 years old at the time of his return to the throne but ruled with great distinction, known for his capacity for wise judgement and his keen appreciation for modern developments. Sanda Kura is also remembered for his involvement in the production of books on Bornoan history, used in schools in Borno State. He was appointed an honorary Companion of the Order of St Michael and St George in the 1924 Birthday Honours.

Sanda Kura died in the middle of 1937 and was succeeded as shehu by Sanda Kyarimi.
