= Kyari of Bornu =

Kyari

Shehu of the Kanem–Bornu Empire
- Reign: November/December 1893 – February/March 1894
- Predecessor: Ashimi
- Successor: Sanda Wuduroma
- Died: February/March 1894; Gashegar, Bornu
- Issue: Sanda Kyarimi
- Dynasty: al-Kanemi dynasty
- Father: Bukar Kura

Muhammad al-Amin bin Abu Bakr al-Kanemi, called Kyari or Kiyari, was briefly the shehu (ruler) of the Kanem–Bornu Empire in 1893–1894. A son of shehu Bukar Kura (r. 1881–1884/1885), Kyari was twice passed over for the throne before he was appointed shehu in 1893, during Rabih az-Zubayr's invasion of the empire. Kyari rallied the imperial armies in the aftermath of Rabih's destruction of Kukawa, the capital, but was captured and executed by Rabih after ruling for only about three months.

== Early life ==
Kyari was the eldest son of shehu Bukar Kura (r. 1881–1884/1885). Bukar Kura died prematurely and unexpectedly at some point between November 1884 and February/March 1885. Kyari was of age at the time of his father's death but was unprepared to claim the throne, not yet having gathered sufficient support and followers. Bukar Kura was instead followed on the throne by his brother (Kyari's uncle), Ibrahim Kura (r. 1884/1885–1885/1886). After Ibrahim Kura's brief and chaotic reign, Kyari was again passed over for another uncle, Ashimi (1885/1886–1893). Ibrahim Kura had revoked many of Bukar Kura's appointments and the courtiers feared that Kyari would do the same with many of Ibrahim Kura's, which would in turn create further political upheaval.

In 1893, the Sudanese warlord Rabih az-Zubayr invaded the Kanem–Bornu Empire. Ashimi first sent the general Momman Tahr against the invader but Tahr was decisively defeated by Rabih's forces at the battle of Amja. Probably in August 1893, a second engagement with Rabih took place at Lekarawa, west of Ngala. This time, Ashimi himself accompanied the army, which was led by Kyari. Rabih was again victorious, which threw the imperial court in Kukawa into a panic. Ashimi was expected to gather his forces and attempt to repel Rabih again, but the shehu, along with his family and some of his followers instead fled in the night. Several other people of prominence in Kukawa followed suit, and the capital was left to the mercy of Rabih, who laid waste to the town.

Ashimi established himself at the village of Maganwa, some distance south of Geidam. Although Ashimi had been soundly defeated, most of the empire still remained loyal to the al-Kanemi dynasty (the family of the shehus). Many prominent officials supported the proclamation of a new shehu, settling on Kyari. Ashimi retained some support but Kyari's supporters quickly prevailed. In November or December 1893, Kyari was appointed as the new shehu in a ceremony at Geidam. Ashimi attended the ceremony, indicating his support for a transfer of power to Kyari. Despite this, Kyari had Ashimi assassinated shortly after the ceremony, while Ashimi was saying his morning prayers. The reason for Kyari having Ashimi killed is unclear. Some accounts claim that Ashimi was corresponding with Rabih whereas others claim that Kyari feared that loyalties among his courtiers and forces would be divided between himself and his uncle.

== Reign ==
Kyari regrouped the imperial army at Geidam to prepare for a campaign to retake Kukawa and capture Dikwa, Rabih's seat of power. In February or March 1894, when Kyari's forces were at Dimurwa, near Gashegar on the banks of the Yobe River, Rabih's forces made a pre-emptive attack. At the ensuing battle of Dimurwa, Kyari was initially victorious as Rabih's positions were overrun and his forces were forced to flee. Kyari made a fatal mistake in delaying to press the advantage, enabling Rabih to counter-attack in the night. Most of Kyari's army fled and the shehu was wounded in the fighting. Kyari tried to rally his forces but was unable to do so and resorted to make a last stand alongside three of his brothers.

Kyari was eventually captured alive and taken to Rabih. Kyari refused to reply to any of Rabih's questions. After some time, Kyari finally spoke his last words to Rabih through an interpreter:

Tell this giant of a slave that if I had captured him I would not have asked him anything, I would have killed him on the spot. Let him not ask me any further questions. If he has anything to do, let him.

Rabih then had Kyari's throat cut.
