= Bukar Kura =

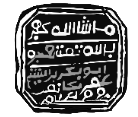
- Bukar Kura's official seal, 1881

Shehu of the Kanem–Bornu Empire
- Reign: December 1881 – 1884/1885
- Predecessor: Umar Kura
- Successor: Ibrahim Kura
- Born: c. 1830
- Died: Between November 1884 and March 1885 (aged c. 54–55)
- Burial: Kukawa
- Issue: Kyari; Sanda Wuduroma
- Dynasty: al-Kanemi dynasty
- Father: Umar Kura

Abu Bakr bin Umar al-Kanemi, called Bukar Kura or simply Bukar, was the shehu (ruler) of the Kanem–Bornu Empire in 1881–1884/1885. The empire began to experience a severe economic crisis in Bukar's reign. The shehu took several measures to halt the crisis, going so far as to implement the so-called kumoreji in 1883 which meant appropriating half the wealth of the peasants of the empire. Bukar was a proven military commander and had an energetic personality. Widely regarded as a promising ruler, Bukar died prematurely and unexpectedly in 1884 or 1885.

== Early life ==
Bukar Kura was a son of shehu Umar Kura (r. 1837–1853 and 1854–1881). He was born c. 1830.

In 1851, a British expedition led by the German explorer Heinrich Barth passed through Bornu. Barth met Bukar Kura when he was about eleven years old and had a highly negative opinion of the young prince, writing:

As for Bú-Bakr, the eldest son of ʽOmár, who now unfortunately seems to have the best claim to the succession, he was a child, devoid of intelligence or noble feelings. Twice was I obliged to have recourse to his father to make him pay me for some articles he had bought of me.

The death of Umar's influential advisor Laminu Njitiya in 1871 led to an increase in politics and intrigue at the imperial court. The struggle to gain Umar's favor was won by Bukar and his close companion Ahamed bin Ibrahim Wadaima, who may have been named waziri (vizier). Umar relied more and more on Bukar Kura during his final years and was close to appointing him regent. The favor gained by Bukar alienated both Ahamed and the shehu's second son, Ibrahim Kura. The feud between Bukar and Ibrahim developed into open animosity. While on a military campaign against the Musgum people, Ibrahim accused Bukar of sending him into the thickest part of the fighting so that he might be killed. Umar was forced to forbid the two princes from going on campaigns together. Ahamed became a loyal supporter of Ibrahim as his own influence also decreased.

== Reign ==
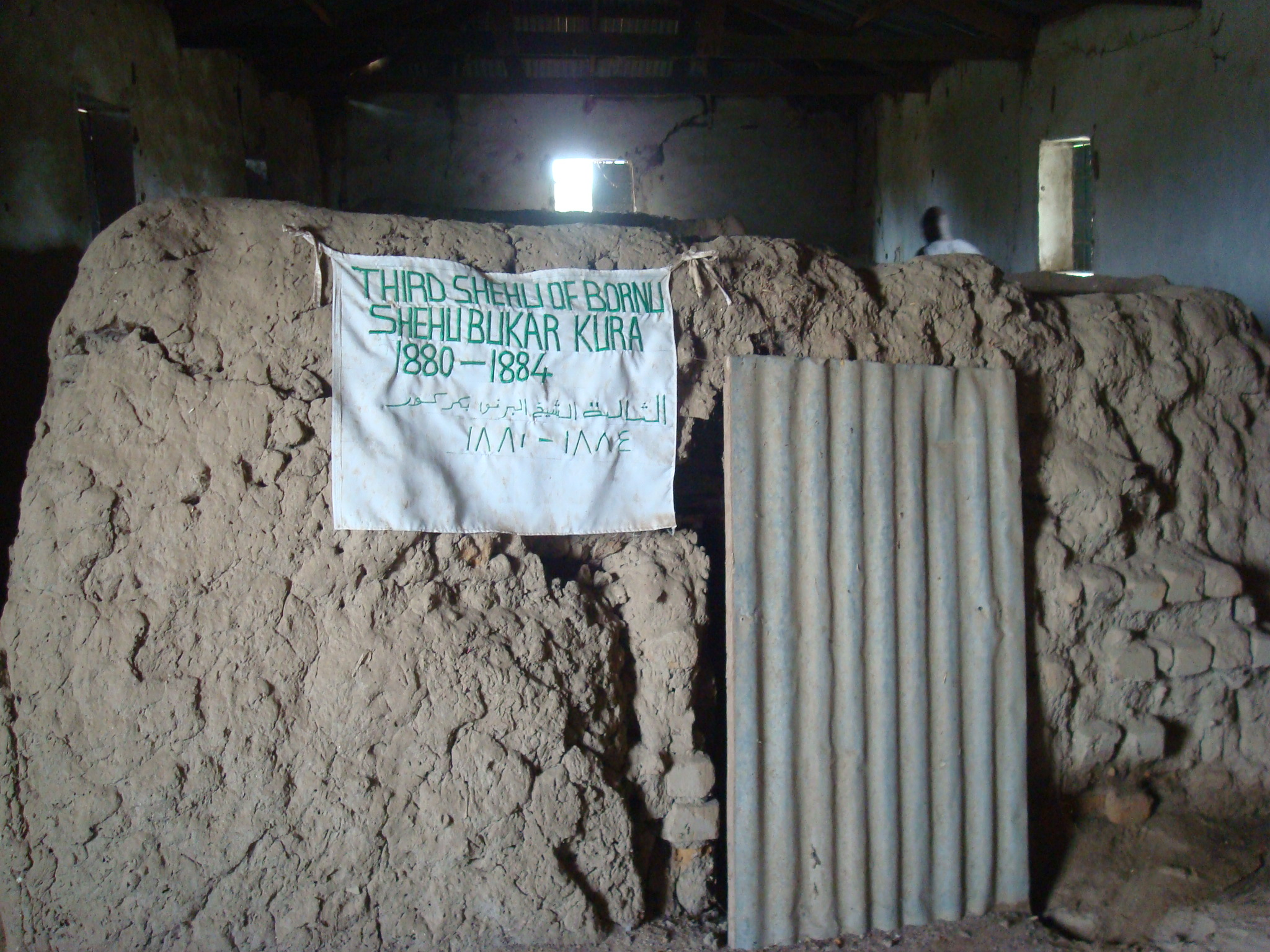
Tomb of Bukar Kura in Kukawa

Umar died in December 1881. (Note: Some scholars have alternatively given dates such as 1879 and 1880, based on erroneous calculations or a wrong start year for Umar Kura's reign.) Ahamed attempted to secure Ibrahim's appointment as shehu but most of the courtiers and royal slaves supported Bukar, who had amassed a wide following during his father's last years. Ahamed died 40 days after Bukar's accession, dying of anger according to the traditional account. After Ahamed's death, his property, fiefs, and slaves were confiscated by Bukar. Ahamed's son Abba Gana received only one fief, consisting of a single village.

As a proven military commander and a man with an energetic and forceful personality, Bukar's accession was a promising change in the Kanem–Bornu Empire's leadership. Most of the frontiers of the empire were stable at the time of Bukar's accession and the greatest issue of his reign was the beginning of an economic crisis. Over the course of the preceding decades, Arab traders had become reluctant to do business in Bornu, perceiving the locals as dishonest businessmen and the authorities as failing to enforce payments of debts. Furthermore, demands for slaves (one of the empire's exports) had fallen over the years, resulting in a greater focus on the export of luxury items such as ivory and ostrich plumes. Poor economic conditions in Europe in the 1870s and 1880s drastically lowered the demand for these items as well, harming the trans-Saharan trade. Bukar worked to improve the Arab perception of trade in Bornu and contemporary sources suggest that his government was better at policing commercial activities than that of his father.

As the economic crisis grew worse, Bukar adopted an extreme measure in 1883 called the kumoreji ("splitting of the calabash"): appropriating half of the assets and wealth of the empire's peasants, in the form of cattle, horses, and slaves. In reality, more than half was taken, with authorities sometimes going so far as to hold the children of peasants for ransom.

Bukar Kura died unexpectedly and prematurely. He died at some point in or after November 1884 and before February/March 1885 when his successor is recorded to have been ruling. The kumoreji had not yet been completed at the time of Bukar's death and the empire's economic crisis was unresolved. Bukar had also not designated an heir, which gave rise to a brief succession crisis until the throne was secured by his brother Ibrahim.
