= Musa Usman =

Nigerian politician

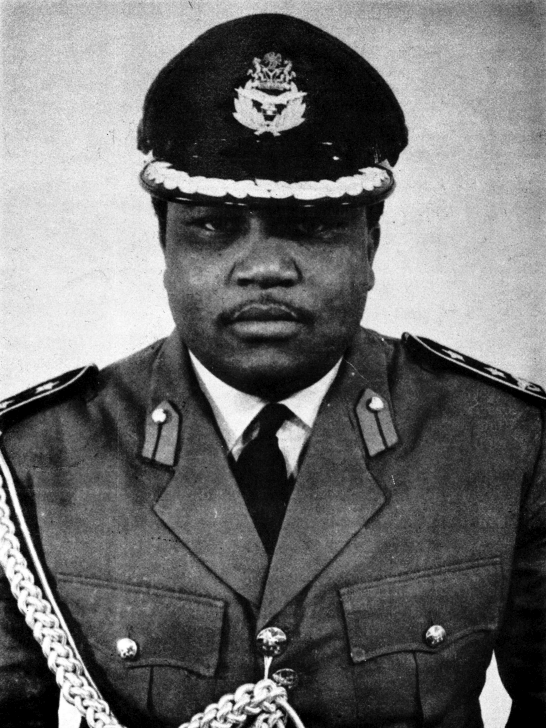

Governor, North-Eastern State, Nigeria
- In office 28 May 1967 – July 1975
- Preceded by: Hassan Katsina (Northern Region)
- Succeeded by: Muhammadu Buhari

Military service
- Allegiance: Nigeria
- Branch/service: Nigerian Air Force
- Rank: Brigadier General

Brigadier (air force) Musa Usman was the first governor of North-Eastern State, Nigeria from May 1967 to July 1975 after the state had been formed from part of Northern Region during the military regime of General Yakubu Gowon.

Usman attended the Royal Military Academy Sandhurst, England gaining his commission in 1962. Major Usman was a participant in the July 1966 coup when Major General Aguiyi Ironsi was overthrown, replaced by General Yakubu Gowon. Appointed governor of North-East State in May 1967, Usman initiated construction of the Ashaka cement factory, eventually opened on 19 July 1979 by Major-General Shehu Musa Yar'Adua. In 1975 he participated in friendly negotiations with Cameroon to settle the border between that country and Nigeria. He was a cautious supporter of the principle that the military government should hand over to civilian rule in 1976.

After retirement, he was allocated a residence in the prestigious Jabi Street area of Kaduna. Usman later became a director of the Bank of the North.
