= Ngala =

- Local Government Area
- Interactive map of Ngala
- Country: Nigeria
- State: Borno State
- Headquarters: Gamboru

Area
  - Total: 1,465 km^{2} (566 sq mi)

Population (2006)
  - Total: 237,071
  - Density: 161.8/km^{2} (419.1/sq mi)
- Time zone: UTC+1 (WAT)
- Postal code: 611

Ngala is a local government area of Borno State, Nigeria, adjacent to the border with Cameroon. Its headquarters are in the town of Gamboru Ngala.

It has an area of 1,465 km^{2} and a population of 237,071 at the 2006 census.

The postal code of the area is 611.

It is one of the sixteen LGAs that constitute the Dikwa Emirate, a traditional state located in Borno State, Nigeria.

== Geology ==
Ngala is situated in the east central area of the state. It is not far from the Chad Basin, which has been a structural depression since the Tertiary period. It has vast fertile lands of sandy-loam to clay soil types, where crops like wheat, rice, and vegetables are grown under irrigated conditions.

=== Vegetation and soil ===
This local government area has a vast fertile land of sandy-loam to clay soil types, where crops like wheat, rice, and vegetables are grown under irrigated conditions. The land is characterized by a sandy flat plain land with scanty vegetation from the central to the northern part, while to the south the soil is sandy loam to heavy clay, with uneven topography characterized by sand dust. The vegetation is moderate.

=== Land form, relief and natural resources ===
The land in Ngala generally consists of plains which are covered by a superficial deposit of sand and clay. Rather there accumulation of sand due to the action of the prevailing winds in blowing the loose Sahara sand from the desert to fringe areas. The river Elbeji is the only river passing through the area. Rainfall in Ngala is seasonal. It has it peak in the months of August and September.

Mineral resources include clay and bentonite.

== Socio-economic life ==
Agriculture is the pivot of the state's economy. Almost eighty-five percent (85%) of the people of the study area are farmers, herdsmen or fishermen. Ngala has enormous agricultural and livestock development potential and is a large livestock centre. Its major cash crops include: groundnut, cotton, cowpea. Other crops are wheat, rice, and watermelon. Some crops in Ngala are irrigated.

=== People ===
The people in study area are largely Kanuri, Hausa/Fulani-speaking people.

== Climate ==
The average April temperature in Ngala is 41 °C (106 °F), while the lowest January temperature is 26 °C (79 °F), indicating a warm season.

== Towns ==
- Gamboru Ngala, the capital
- Wulgo town, located very close to the coast of Chad, Ammanni, Fuye and Bugda
