= Dikwa =

- Local Government Area and town
- Interactive map of Dikwa
- Coordinates: 12°1′26″N 13°54′57″E
- Country: Nigeria
- State: Borno State
- Headquarters: Dikwa

Area
  - Total: 1,774 km^{2} (685 sq mi)

Population (2006)
  - Total: 105,909
  - Density: 59.70/km^{2} (154.6/sq mi)
- Time zone: UTC+1 (WAT)
- Postal code: 611

Dikwa is a town and a local government area in Borno State, Nigeria.

== History ==
When the Sudanese warlord Rabih az-Zubayr conquered the Kanem–Bornu Empire in 1893, Rabih destroyed the empire's capital at Kukawa. Rabih spent some time at Kukawa but settled on Dikwa as his capital instead, since the town had better communications and a superior water supply. Dikwa was heavily fortified and remained Rabih's capital for the duration of his rule. Rabih was killed by a French army, bolstered by local Bornu forces, at the battle of battle of Kousséri in 1900. The al-Kanemi dynasty, which had governed the Kanem–Bornu Empire prior to Rabih's invasion, was reinstalled as rulers with French and local support. With Kukawa destroyed, Dikwa remained the capital during the last years of the Kanem–Bornu Empire under the shehus Sanda Kura, Masta Gumsumi, and Abubakar Garbai. In 1902, all territories of the empire came under European colonial rule. Per a 1893 treaty, Dikwa fell under German control.

Between 1902 and 1916, Dikwa was the capital of what the Europeans called German Borno (the modern-day Dikwa Emirate). After the First World War until 1961, the town and the Dikwa Emirate were administered by the British under a League of Nations mandate and a United Nations Trusteeship agreement. In 1942, Dikwa ceased to be the capital of the Dikwa Emirate. Bama became the capital of the Emirate which kept its name as Dikwa Emirate.

In 1961, after a United Nations plebiscite, the town and the Dikwa Emirate became officially Nigerian.

== Photographs of historical sites in Dikwa ==
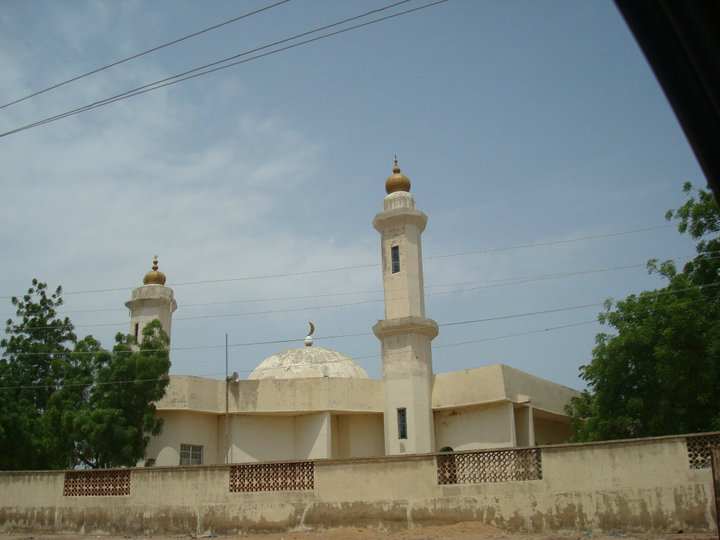
Mosque of Dikwa (2010)

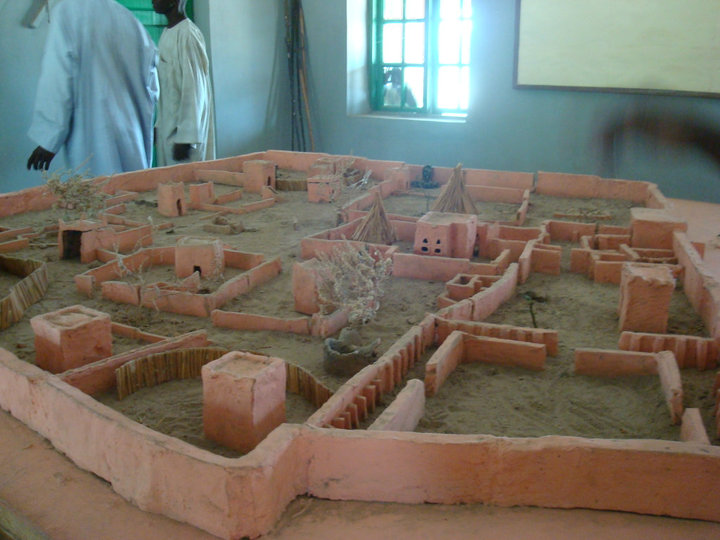
Fort of Dikwa model (Museum of Dikwa - 2010)

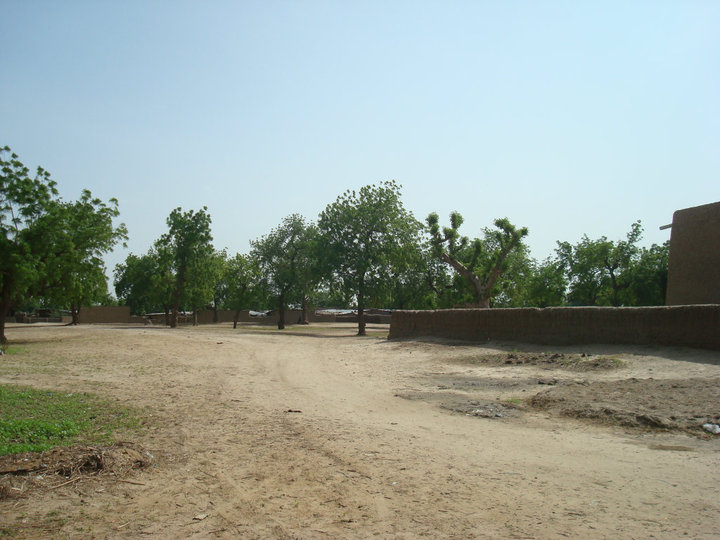
Walls of Dikwa fort (2010)

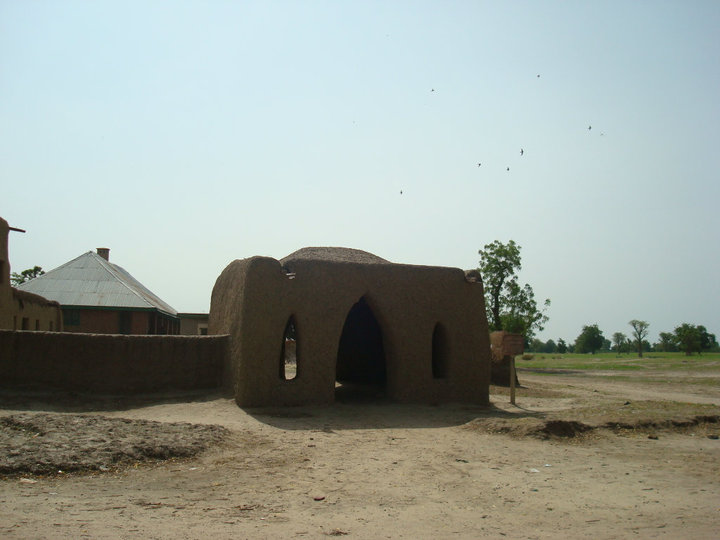
Tower and walls of Dikwa fort (2010)

== Local government area of Nigeria ==
Dikwa is a Local government area of Borno State, Nigeria. Its headquarters are in the town of Dikwa, which is also the seat of the Dikwa Emirate.

== Climate ==
With an annual rainfall range of 380 to 810 millimetres (15 to 32 inches), the Bornu and Dikwa Emirates have a semiarid climate with a long dry season and a brief wet season.

== Landscape ==
It has an area of 1,774 km^{2} and had a population of 25,300 inhabitants in 2010 according to Africapolis. The 2006 census gave an estimated number of 105,909 inhabitants but, as in the rest of Nigeria, these figures should be taken with caution.

== Postal code ==
The postal code of the area is 611.

== Bibliography ==
- Anyangwe, Carlson, Betrayal of Too Trusting a People: The UN, the UK and the Trust Territory of the Southern Cameroons (African Books Collective, 2009).
- Callahan, Michael, Mandates and Empire: The League of Nations and Africa 1914-1931 (Sussex Academic Press, 2008).
- Callahan, Michael, A Sacred Trust: The League of Nations and Africa, 1929-1946 (Sussex Academic Press, 2004).
- Chem-Langhëë, Bongfen, The Paradoxes of Self-Determination in the Cameroons under United Kingdom Administration: The Search for Identity, Well-Being, and Continuity (Lanham, MD: University Press of America, 2003).
- Cooper, Malcolm, The Northern Cameroons Plebiscite 1960/61: A Memoir with Photo Archive (Electronic ISBN Publication: Mandaras Publishing, 2010).
- Digre, Brian, Imperialism’s New Clothes : the Repartition of Tropical Africa, 1914-1919 (New York: Lang, 1990).
- Hallam, W. K. R., The life and times of Rabih Fadl Allah (Ilfracombe: Stockwell, 1977).
- Hogben, S. J. and Kirk-Greene, Anthony, The Emirates of Northern Nigeria: a Preliminary Survey of Their Historical Traditions (Oxford University Press: London, 1966), p. 352.
- Ikime, Obaro, ‘The fall of Borno’, in The fall of Nigeria: the British conquest (London: Heinemann Educational, 1977), pp. 178–184.
- Johnson, D. H. N., ‘The Case Concerning the Northern Cameroons’, The International and Comparative Law Quarterly, 13 (1964), 1143-1192.
- Oloa Zambo, Anicet, L’affaire Du Cameroun Septentrional : Cameroun, Royaume-Uni (Paris : l’Harmattan, 2006).
- Osuntokun, Akinjide, Nigeria in the First World War (London: Longman, 1979).
- Prescott, J. R. V., ‘The Evolution of the Anglo-French Inter-Cameroons Boundary’, The Nigerian Geographical Journal, 5 (1962), 103-20.
- Report of the United Nations Commissioner for the Supervision of the Plebiscites in the Cameroons under United Kingdom Administration, (T/1491) (New York: Trusteeship Council, United Nations, 1959).
- Sharwood-Smith, Bryan, “But Always as Friends”: Northern Nigeria and the Cameroons, 1921-1957 (London: Allen & Unwin, 1969).
- Vaughan, James H., ‘Culture, History, and Grass-Roots Politics in a Northern Cameroons Kingdom’, American Anthropologist, New Series, 66 (1964), 1078-1095.
- Yearwood, Peter, ‘Great Britain and the Repartition of Africa, 1914–19’, The Journal of Imperial and Commonwealth History, 18 (1990), 316–341.
- Yearwood, Peter, ‘“In a Casual Way with a Blue Pencil”: British Policy and the Partition of Kamerun, 1914-1919’, Canadian Journal of African Studies, 27 (1993), 218-244.
- Yearwood, Peter, ‘From Lines on Maps to National Boundaries: The Case of Northern Nigeria and Cameroun’, in Maps and Africa : Proceedings of a Colloquium at the University of Aberdeen, April 1993, ed. by Jeffrey C. Stone (Aberdeen: Aberdeen University African Studies Group, 1994).
- Yearwood, Peter, “The Reunification of Borno, 1914-1918,” Borno Museum Society Newsletter 25 (1995): 25-45.
