= Albert Horsfall =

Nigerian intelligence officer (1941–2026)

Director of State Security Service
- In office September 1990 – October 1992
- President: Ibrahim Babangida
- Preceded by: Ismaila Gwarzo
- Succeeded by: Peter Nwaoduah

Director of National Intelligence Agency
- In office 1986–1990
- Preceded by: Position established
- Succeeded by: Halilu Akilu

Personal details
- Born: 22 December 1941 Buguma, Colony and Protectorate of Nigeria
- Died: September 2026 (aged 84)

Albert Korubo Horsfall (22 December 1941 – 9 September 2026) was a Nigerian high ranking security and intelligence official. He was a police officer and pioneer member of the National Security Organization (NSO). Horsfall was also the first director of the National Intelligence Agency (NIA); and the second director of the State Security Service (SSS).

== Early life ==
Albert Horsfall was born on 22 December 1941 in Buguma in present-day Rivers State.

He grew up in Degema, the administrative headquarters of Degema Division, one of the four divisions that made up the then Rivers Province. Horsfall's father was a successful merchant and he fathered 11 children; three of whom died. Albert left home at the age of seven to live with an uncle, Alex Horsfall, a top civil servant who lived at Degema Consulate. In 1947, Albert began his elementary schooling at Saint Batha School, Degema; he remembers walking from Degema Consulate, then an area populated by expatriates and Nigerian civil servants to his school.

In 1951, Horsfall's schooling was disrupted by the death of his uncle Albert in the United Kingdom while taking in-service training. Albert had to return to his parents in Buguma, where he completed his primary education at Saint Michael's School, Emohua. In 1959, he graduated from Christ School of Commerce Onitsha, a school owned by his father's friend.

== Early career ==
At age 17 in 1962, he joined the Nigeria Police Force (NPF) for cadet training, but had to wait a year before this could begin. In 1965, he completed his training with the rank of Assistant Superintendent of Police (ASP). After a brief stint in Abakaliki, Horsfall was selected to join the Special Branch; at the time, the top three cadet graduates were selected for posting in either the A Department Force Headquarters, the Criminal Investigation Department (CID), or the Special Branch. Soon after, Horsfall's boss and Special Branch commissioner, J. J. Sullivan, a retired British Major recognized Horsfall's potential and deployed him to the Border control unit at Enugu. At the time, most Nigerian officers in the Special Branch were regarded by the expatriate officers as being more loyal than intelligent.

After Sullivan went on retirement leave, his Nigerian successor, T. H. Fagbola, who needed capable Nigerian officers to work with, assigned Horsfall back to headquarters in Lagos. Soon after, Horsfall attended an intelligence training course in the United States. While he was there in 1966, the Nigerian Civil War broke out. Horsfall, from the southern part of the country, returned to Nigeria on the side of the Federal Government. At the time, General Yakubu Gowon's government had dissolved the country's four regions—Northern Region, Western region, Mid-Western Region, and the Eastern Region—into 12 new states. This was calculated to fragment support for the seceding Biafran state, which was mostly made up of the Eastern Region and the Mid-Western State. Horsfall's new Rivers State was formerly part of the Eastern Region, which now sided with the Federal Government in the war.

When Horsfall returned from the United States, the Special Branch was severely short-staffed because of the exodus of easterners to seceding Biafra. This situation thrust a greater workload on him and might in part also account for his rapid rise in the service. Horsfall claims to have been embedded with the federal troops in Opobo, Calabar, Onne, and Port Harcourt; he obviously would have held some advantage in this role because he was indigenous to the area.

In 1972, Horsfall married Henrietta. She was one of a couple of young women he had helped move to Lagos to continue their education during the civil war, and he knew her family. They have seven children.

== National Security ==
=== National Security Organisation ===
Horsfall remained with the Special Branch until 1976, when the department was excised from the NPF due to the creation of the National Security Organization (NSO). Horsfall, by then an Assistant Commissioner of Police joined the NSO as an officer under the first Director-General, Colonel Abdullahi Mohammed.

He claimed he had always wanted to study law but had not been able to because of the demands of his job. His former bosses at the Special Branch and the NSO, M. D. Yusuf and Abdullahi Mohammed, had refused his applications for a study leave on the grounds he was too useful to their organizations to lose. He eventually left the NSO without official leave to study law in 1979. He was able to do this during the handover period between the outgoing director general, Colonel Abdullahi Mohammed, and the incoming director general, Umaru Shinkafi. Horsfall alleged that Shinkafi was sympathetic to his cause because Shinkafi himself, a former commissioner of police, had also taken leave of the Police to study law.

Horsfall rose through the ranks of the NSO and eventually became the agency's second deputy director general, replacing Peter Odukwe after he was retired in 1984 during a purge of Shinkafi-era operatives by the new NSO director general, Ambassador Mohammed Lawal Rafindadi. Horsfall held this position till the dissolution of the NSO in 1986 by the new military government headed by General Ibrahim Babangida. During his time as NSO deputy director general under Rafindadi, the agency was at its height of notoriety. Political repression was rife, arrest and detention without trial under the infamous Decree 2 (state security; detention of persons) and Decree 4 (press gag) was common. One of the more notorious actions of the NSO during this period was the "Dikko Affair." The Dikko Affair was an attempt by the NSO and an Israeli collaborator to kidnap and repatriate second republic Transport Minister Alhaji Umaru Dikko from his United Kingdom exile in 1984. The attempt failed and Nigeria suffered great diplomatic and economic repercussions, Horsfall has denied any involvement in the attempt.

=== National Intelligence Agency ===
The Babangida government launched investigations into NSO activities under Rafindadi, a Commission of Inquiry headed by former NSO Director General Umaru Shinkafi was also instituted. The security services were reorganised under Decree 19 of 1986, which led to the creation of three agencies: the State Security Service (SSS), the National Intelligence Agency (NIA), and the Defence Intelligence Agency (DIA). The new government appointed Horsfall the first director general of the NIA. The NIA was responsible for Nigeria's foreign intelligence.

=== State Security Service ===
Horsfall held the NIA position until 1990, when he replaced Alhaji Ismaila Gwarzo as the second director general of the state security service. On 10 October 1992, Horsfall left the SSS.

== Later career ==
=== Oil Mineral Producing Areas Development Commission ===
From 1993, he was the first chairman of the Oil Mineral Producing Areas Development Commission (OMPADEC), a special purpose vehicle established by the government to bring about rapid development to the oil-producing Niger Delta; Horsfall was indigenous to the area. Horsfall hired Goodluck Jonathan, later a president of Nigeria, for OMPADEC, Jonathan's first public service job. On 22 February 1996, the OMPADEC Board was dissolved.

Horsfall and the OMPADEC commissioners were removed based on claims by the Abacha government of widespread non-performance by contractors; the government claimed these contractors received mobilization money but failed to perform satisfactorily. This followed a prolonged campaign of calumny mounted by Dr. Junaid, the fiery advocate of northern supremacy who Horsfall forcefully removed from the OMPADEC Board in 1995. In defence of his role and integrity, Horsfall claimed with authentic figures and statistics from the Central Bank of Nigeria (CBN) that during his three years of service in OMPADEC, the commission had received only 11.48 billion naira approximately $133,488,372 from government through monthly disbursements from the Central Bank of Nigeria (CBN) and that with this paltry sum he had performed a near miracle by dotting the whole of the nine oil-producing states with several on-going, medium and major projects and actually completed and commissioned 102 such projects and put them in use by the various communities throughout those oil-producing states.

Following the OMPADEC Commission's dissolution and the removal of Horsfall and his Board, five different investigation panels probed the allegations of corruption, uncompleted projects, and debts being owed by contractors to OMPADEC. These included a panel headed by the famous anti-corruption crusader Economics Professor Sam Aluko. None of these panels returned a verdict of corruption or improprieties on Horsfall.

=== Legal career ===
In 1997, he established his law firm, Horsfall and Company, a legal consultancy firm. He was chairman or a member of several federal constitutional review bodies, special adviser to President Olusegun Obasanjo on Niger Delta Development, rehabilitation of militant and delinquent Rivers State youth, a member of the Nigerian National Constitutional Conference 2014, and a member of its special committee of 50 "wise men."

== Death ==
Horsfall died on 9 September 2026. He was 84.
