= National Security Adviser (Nigeria) =

Senior official appointed by the President

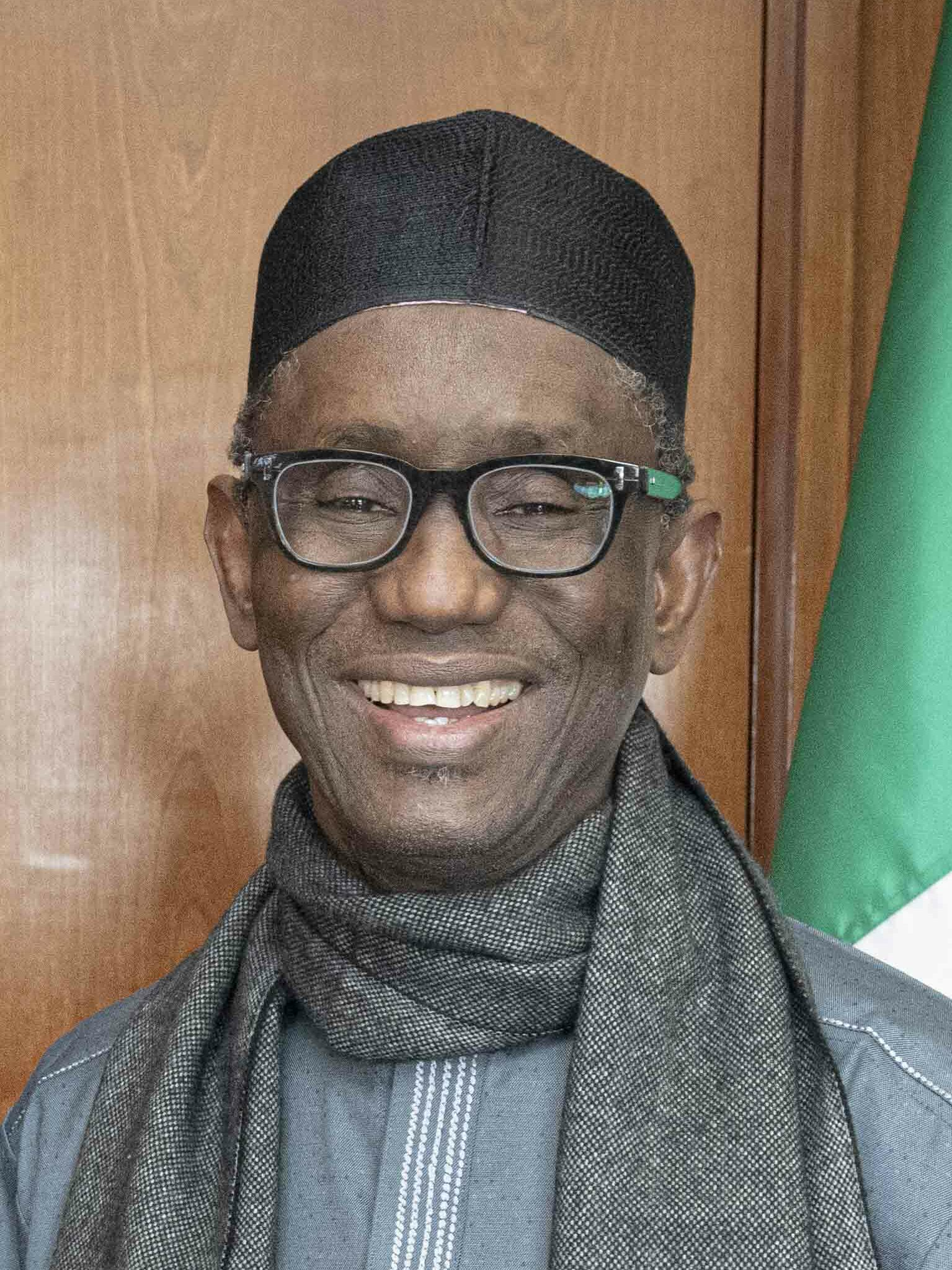
- Incumbent; Nuhu Ribadu since 26 June 2023
- Office of the National Security Adviser
- Member of: Federal Executive Council; National Security Council
- Reports to: President of Nigeria
- Appointer: President of Nigeria
- Constituting instrument: National Security Agencies Act
- Formation: 1990 (36 years ago)
- First holder: Muhammadu Gambo Jimeta (Police); Aliyu Mohammed Gusau (military)
- Website: Official website

The Nigerian National Security Adviser, commonly referred to as the NSA, is a senior official of the federal government of Nigeria, based at the Three Arms Zone in Abuja, FCT. The national security adviser acts on behalf of the president of Nigeria, co-ordinating the management of all national security matters as principal adviser on state security. The position is a statutory member of the National Security Council (NSC) and Federal Executive Council (FEC), and chairs meetings of the Nigerian intelligence agencies. The NSA is supported by the Office of the National Security Adviser (ONSA), which includes executive staff drawn from intelligence, the armed forces, law enforcement and paramilitary units who primarily fulfil roles assigned them by the NSA at any given time in furtherance of the national security strategy of Nigeria. The National Security Adviser serves at the pleasure of the President and does not require confirmation from the Nigerian Senate. The duties of the NSA varies from administration to administration; and depends not only on the qualities of the person appointed to the position, but also on the style and management philosophy of the incumbent President. Historically, appointment to the office has been held by senior police officers, and, the top brass of military officers up to, and, including three- and four-star generals.

== History ==
=== Early years ===
The National Security Organisation was established after the assassination of Murtala Muhammed with legal instrument Decree Number 27 of 1976 to co-ordinate internal security, foreign intelligence and counterintelligence activities; this was part of a larger reorganisation that saw the demobilisation of the Nigerian Armed Forces and the Nigerian Civil Service. The Decree did not establish the position of the national security adviser, but it did create a director-general in charge of the staff. In 1979, the NSO became part of the Executive Office of the President under Shehu Shagari. The Shagari administration maintained the NSO and appointed Bukar Shaib special adviser on national security, who was later succeeded in 1983 by Shehu Ahmad Said Galadanchi. These two were special advisers to the president and not national security advisers.

The coup d'etat of 1983 led to the promulgation of Decree Number 2 of 1984 by Muhammadu Buhari, which entrusted the NSO with unprecedented powers "to detain without charge persons suspected of acts prejudicial to state security or harmful to the economic well-being of the country": the detention of individuals deemed to be enemies of the state without charge, and the limitation of civil rights and individual liberties transformed the NSO's mandate from its main focus on national security to regime state security with the state persecuting individuals through intimidation, harassment and secret imprisonment.

=== Under Babangida and Abacha ===
Decree Number 19 of 1986 (National Security Agencies Act) created the position of Coordinator of National Security in 1986 and Aliyu Gusau was appointed as national security coordinator by Ibrahim Babangida. In this new role, Gusau coordinated the dismantling of the NSO (who's notoriety had led to the fall of the Buhari regime) into three succeeding agencies, the State Security Service, the National Intelligence Agency and the Defence Intelligence Agency. Gusau later became the first military national security adviser in 1993 merging both roles as coordinator of national security and national security adviser under the Office of the National Security Adviser. Muhammadu Gambo Jimeta was the first civilian national security adviser in 1990 during the Babangida administration. The politico-military situation of the early 1990s required the need for a central body for coordination, control and supervision of national security. Jimeta at the time did not have a schedule of operation for his new office, during the move of the seat of government from Lagos to Abuja, and most national security issues then were still tentatively under the purview of the Coordinator of National Security. The system established has remained largely unchanged since then, particularly since President Ibrahim Babangida signed into law the National Security Agencies Act of 1986, except for under Sani Abacha when his chief bodyguard Hamza al-Mustapha was in charge of security for the regime. The return to democracy under the Constitution of Nigeria in 1999 established the National Security Council (NSC).

=== Fourth Republic ===
Aliyu Gusau held the office twice in the Fourth Republic under President Olusegun Obasanjo's administration he enhanced the importance of the office, controlling the flow of information to the president and meeting with him multiple times per day. Gusau also holds the distinction of serving as national security adviser under both the military dictatorship and non-consecutive democratic administrations: the Obasanjo administration and the Goodluck Jonathan administration. The Terrorism (Prevention) Amendment Act, 2013 empowered the national security adviser establishing the National Counter-Terrorism Centre under his office to coordinate national security in response to the Boko Haram insurgency. Gusau holds the record for total term of interspersed service (2,906 days); and his deputy Kayode Are holds the record for shortest term, at just 17 days in an acting role.

== Office of the National Security Adviser ==
The Office of the National Security Adviser (ONSA) falls under the ambit of the Cabinet Office.

=== National Counter-Terrorism Centre ===
The Counter-Terrorism Centre established in ONSA leads implementation of the Policy Framework and National Action Plan for Preventing and Countering Violent Extremism.

Structure:

- Directorate of Intelligence (DINT)
- Directorate of Training and Operations (DTOPS)
- Directorate of Technical Services (DTS)
- Directorate of Preventing and Countering Violent Extremism (DPCVE)
- Directorate of CT Policy and Strategy (DPS)
- Directorate of International Relations and Liaison (DIRL)
- Department of Strategic Communications (STRATCOM)
- Department of Investigations
- Department of Special Services
- Department of Finance
- Department of Legal Services

== List ==
The table below contains a list of persons who have held the position since it was formally established in 1990:

No.	Name	Term of office		President(s) served under
No.	Name	Start	End	President(s) served under
1	Muhammadu Gambo Jimeta	January 1990	2 January 1993	Ibrahim Babangida
2	Aliyu Mohammed Gusau	2 January 1993	30 August 1993	Ibrahim Babangida
3	Ismaila Gwarzo	30 August 1993	9 June 1998	Ernest Shonekan; Sani Abacha
4	Abdullahi Mohammed	9 June 1998	29 May 1999	Abdulsalami Abubakar
5	Aliyu Mohammed Gusau	29 May 1999	1 June 2006	Olusegun Obasanjo
6	Abdullahi Sarki Mukhtar	1 June 2006	8 March 2010	Olusegun Obasanjo; Umaru Musa Yar'Adua
7	Aliyu Mohammed Gusau	8 March 2010	18 September 2010	Goodluck Jonathan
–	Kayode Are (acting)	18 September 2010	4 October 2010	Goodluck Jonathan
8	Owoye Andrew Azazi	4 October 2010	22 June 2012	Goodluck Jonathan
9	Sambo Dasuki	22 June 2012	13 July 2015	Goodluck Jonathan
10	Babagana Monguno	13 July 2015	26 June 2023	Muhammadu Buhari; Bola Tinubu
11	Nuhu Ribadu	26 June 2023	present	Bola Tinubu

== See also ==
- National Security Organization
- State Security Service (Nigeria)
- Defence Intelligence Agency (Nigeria)
- National Intelligence Agency (Nigeria)
