= Haliru Akilu =

Nigerian spymaster

Brigadier General Haliru Akilu

Director of National Intelligence Agency
- In office 1990–1993
- Preceded by: Albert Horsfall
- Succeeded by: Zakari Ibrahim

Chief of Defence Intelligence
- In office January 1990 – September 1990
- Preceded by: Babatunde Elegbede
- Succeeded by: Group Capt. I. Musa
- In office August 1985 – July 1986
- Preceded by: Aliyu Gusau
- Succeeded by: Babatunde Elegbede

Personal details
- Born: 2 November 1947 (age 78) Madobi, Northern Region, British Nigeria (now Madobi, Nigeria)
- Education: Nigerian Defence Academy

Military service
- Allegiance: Nigeria
- Branch/service: Nigerian Army
- Years of service: 1967–1993
- Rank: Brigadier General
- Battles/wars: Nigerian Civil War

Haliru Akilu (born 2 November 1947) is a Nigerian general who was Director of National Intelligence and Director of Military Intelligence at various times in the 1990s.

== Early life and military career ==
Akilu was born and educated in Kano State. Akilu was commissioned in 1967 after he had attended the Nigerian Defence Academy. In 1969, he fought during the Nigerian Civil War as a company commander and was wounded. He later became, commander of the 146 Infantry Battalion that suppressed the Maitatsine religious riots.

He later attended Junior Staff College, Warminister (1973), Pakistan Command and Staff College (1979), King's College London (1983), and the National Institute for Policy and Strategic Studies in Kuru (1989).

== Military intelligence ==
Akilu later joined the Directorate of Military Intelligence. As a lieutenant colonel, he took part in the conceptual stages of the 1983 military coup d'état which ousted the Second Nigerian Republic and installed to power Major-General Muhammadu Buhari. He replaced General Aliyu Gusau as Director of Military Intelligence; and played a key role in the 1985 military coup d'état, which overthrew Muhammadu Buhari. Following the coup, General Babangida (then Chief of Army Staff) exploited his closeness to Akilu and other graduates of the NDA's Regular Course 3 (Babangida was an NDA instructor in the early 70s).

Akilu was strategically placed in the DMI as counterweight to Ambassador Mohammed Lawal Rafindadi, General Muhammadu Buhari’s ally in the national security structure. Akilu's role in the Directorate of Military Intelligence served as counter-intelligence to the National Security Organisation. Akilu played a major coordinating role as (Director of Military Intelligence) in the 1985 military coup d'état that ousted the military head of state General Muhammadu Buhari and brought to power General Ibrahim Babangidaa. Akilu and Babangida have a close relationship in that Akilu's wife and Maryam Babangida are cousins.

== Military regime ==
Akilu was a member of the Armed Forces Ruling Council from 1989 to 1993. Akilu worked alongside General Aliyu Gusau in reorganising the security and intelligence apparatuses, in order to consolidate power for the military regime. National Security Organisation was broken into three organisations: State Security Services (SSS), National Intelligence Agency (NIA); and the Defence Intelligence Agency (DIA) where he served as twice from August 1985 to July 1986 and January 1990 to September 1990.

Akilu was believed to have played a controversial role in the assassination of Dele Giwa. He was accused of having spoken with Dele Giwa's wife and received his home address. Giwa later received a parcel from two men with the inscription – "From the office of the C-in-C" and was marked "secret and confidential" – opening the parcel, an explosion occurred and Dele Giwa was subsequently killed, investigations were conducted into the assassination but the murder remains unsolved. The case was taken to the Supreme Court of Nigeria in Colonel Haliru Akilu vs. Chief Gani Fawehinmi.

== Later career ==
After the 1993 military coup d'état, Akilu was retired by General Sani Abacha. In 2003, at the Oputa Panel the report concluded: "General Haliru Akilu and Colonel A. K. Togun are accountable for the untimely death of Dele Giwa by letter bomb. We recommend that this case be re-opened for further investigation in the public interest."
