= Sambo Dasuki =

Nigerian military officer (born 1954)

Colonel Sambo Dasuki
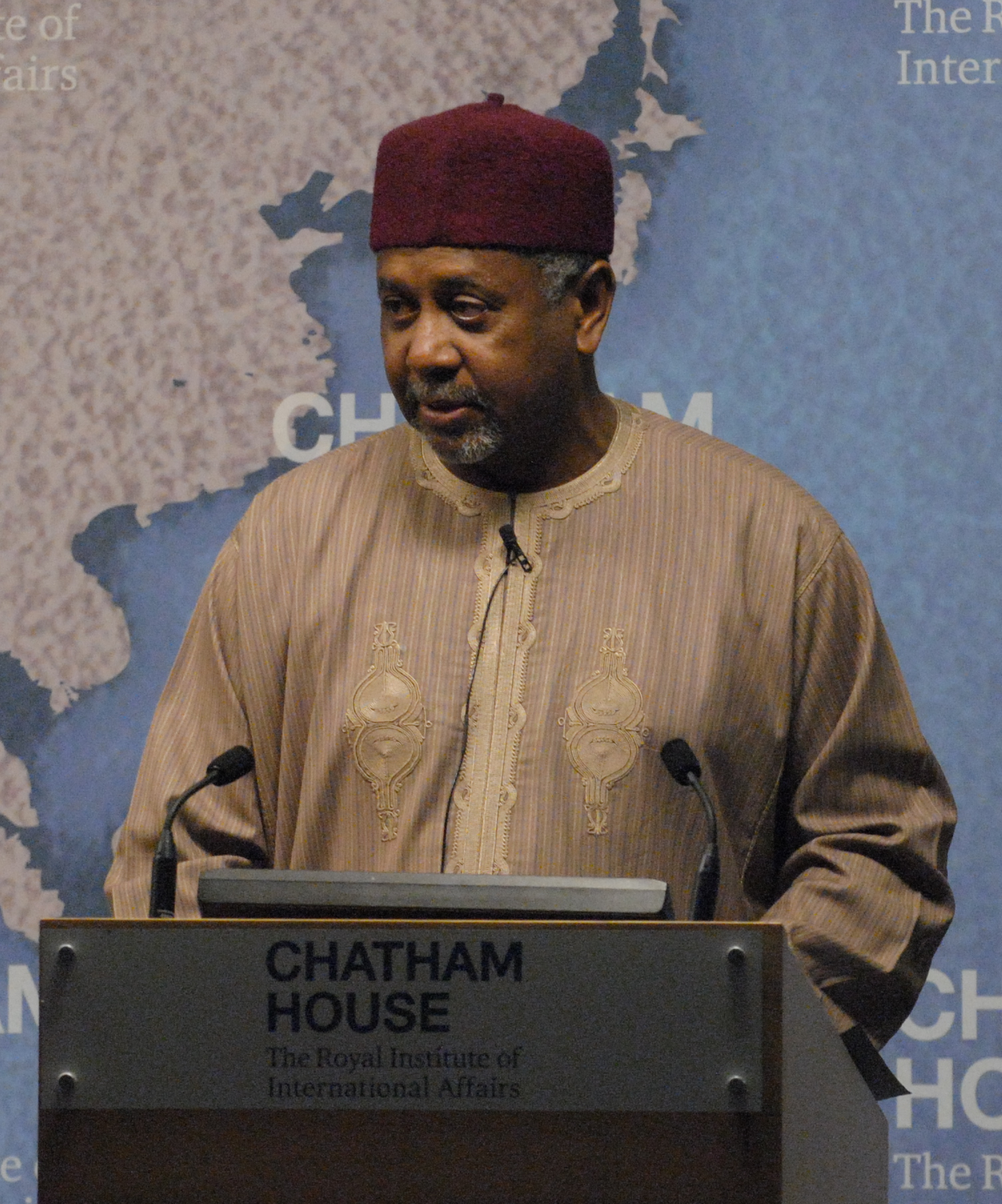
- Dasuki at Chatham House, January 2015

National Security Adviser
- In office 22 June 2012 – 13 July 2015
- President: Goodluck Jonathan; Muhammadu Buhari
- Preceded by: Owoye Andrew Azazi
- Succeeded by: Babagana Monguno

Personal details
- Born: 2 December 1954 (age 71) Wusasa, Zaria, Northern Region, British Nigeria (now in Kaduna State, Nigeria)
- Parent: Ibrahim Dasuki (father)
- Education: Nigerian Defence Academy

Military service
- Allegiance: Nigeria
- Branch/service: Nigerian Army
- Years of service: 1974–1993
- Rank: Colonel

Sambo Dasuki (born 2 December 1954) is a retired Nigerian military officer who served as National Security Adviser to President Goodluck Jonathan and briefly to President Muhammadu Buhari.

== Early life ==
Dasuki was born on December 2, 1954, in Wusasa, to the royal family of Ibrahim Dasuki, the 18th Sultan of Sokoto and is his first son. Dasuki attended Kaduna Capital School for his elementary education and later Government College Kaduna, for his secondary education.

== Military career ==
He entered the Nigerian Defence Academy in 1972 and was classmates with future officers such as Colonel Kayode Are, General Owoye Andrew Azazi, and Admiral Ganiyu Adekeye. Dasuki received his commission from the Nigerian Defence Academy in 1974 and was posted to an Army Headquarters platoon. Additionally, Dasuki has close family ties to Ibrahim Babangida: Dasuki's father Ibrahim Dasuki has been described as a close family friend and godfather to Babangida.

=== Coup d'états ===
Sambo Dasuki (then a major) and military assistant to General Mohammed Inuwa Wushishi participated in the 1983 Nigerian coup d'état that installed Major General Muhammadu Buhari as Nigeria's Head of State.

Later, Dasuki was among four majors (Abubakar Dangiwa Umar, Lawan Gwadabe, and Abdulmumini Aminu) who arrested the Nigerian head of state Muhammadu Buhari in the 1985 palace coup led by Major General Ibrahim Babangida. Sambo Dasuki has consistently denied arresting Buhari. Following the coup, Dasuki was made Aide-de-camp (ADC) to General Ibrahim Babangida.

== Military juntas of 1985–1993 ==
Dasuki worked as Babangida's aide until 1988, when he left the post due to alleged disagreements with the then Chief of Army Staff, General Sani Abacha. He then went to the US where he received further military training.

In 1993, following the rise to power of General Sani Abacha, Dasuki was retired from the army. He was accused of masterminding a coup allegedly led by Lawan Gwadabe. Abacha regime also deposed Dasuki's father as Sultan of Sokoto, replacing him with Muhammadu Maccido.

== Later career ==
In 2001, Dasuki returned to Nigeria and was appointed as the managing director of Nigerian Security Printing and Minting Company Limited (NSPMC). He resigned in protest against controversial privatization of NSPMC by former President Olusegun Obasanjo and retired into private business.

=== National Security Adviser ===
In June 2012, Dasuki was appointed as National Security Advisor by President Goodluck Jonathan.

In early 2015, Dasuki informed the Independent National Electoral Commission "that operations against Boko Haram militants meant the military "will be unable to provide adequate security" for the upcoming 2015 Nigerian general election. The elections, scheduled for 15 February 2015, were then postponed until March 28. Also in April 2015, he insisted that the Nigerian military would ensure that Sambisa Forest, the last fortress of Boko Haram, would be liberated before the May 29 inauguration of President Buhari's new government.

Coincidentally, on the one-year anniversary of the abduction of Chibok school girls, Dasuki insisted that government was concerned about the welfare of every single Nigerian, not only the Chibok girls, as terrorists abducted other innocent Nigerian girls, boys, men, and women, and security agencies were making all efforts to rescue them. The military rescued more than 300 abductees a few weeks afterwards.

== Corruption allegations ==
=== Detention and release ===
On 1 December 2015, Dasuki was arrested by Nigeria's State Security Service (SSS) for allegedly stealing $2.1 billion and accused of awarding phantom contracts to buy 12 helicopters, four fighter jets, and ammunition meant for Nigeria's military campaign against Boko Haram Islamist militants. In November 2018, Dasuki was refused bail by the government despite being granted bail by four different high court judges.

The State Security Service released Dasuki from detention on the 24 December 2019. Dasuki's freedom came hours after the SSS released Omoyele Sowore, an activist who was accused and subsequently arrested in August for an alleged conspiracy to commit treason and insulting President Muhammad Buhari over a planned #RevolutionNow protest.

=== Pandora Papers ===
As a result of the Pandora Papers leaks, the Premium Times reported that in 2013, Dasuki had set up a shell company with the help of government contractor, Leno Adesanya. The report found that the sole shareholders were Dasuki's sons with Adesanya not holding any shares and no other form of clear payment to Adesanya. Adesanya's representative claimed that no undisclosed favours were gained by Adesanya and that he was simply helping Dasuki's sons to set up an offshore company.

== See also ==
- National Security Advisor (Nigeria)
- National Intelligence Agency (Nigeria)
- State Security Service (Nigeria)
