= Aliyu Mohammed Gusau =

Nigerian politician and general (born 1943)

Lieutenant General Aliyu Mohammed Gusau

Minister of Defence
- In office 5 March 2014 – 29 May 2015
- President: Goodluck Jonathan
- Preceded by: Olusola Obada
- Succeeded by: Mansur Dan Ali

Chief of Army Staff
- In office September 1993 – November 1993
- Preceded by: Salihu Ibrahim
- Succeeded by: Chris Alli

Nigerian National Security Adviser
- In office 8 March 2010 – 18 September 2010
- President: Goodluck Jonathan
- Preceded by: Abdullahi Sarki Mukhtar
- Succeeded by: Kayode Are
- In office 29 May 1999 – 1 June 2006
- President: Olusegun Obasanjo
- Preceded by: Abdullahi Mohammed
- Succeeded by: Abdullahi Sarki Mukhtar
- In office January 1993 – August 1993
- President: Ibrahim Babangida
- Preceded by: Position established
- Succeeded by: Ismaila Gwarzo

Commandant of the Nigerian Defence Academy
- In office February 1992 – January 1993
- Preceded by: Garba Duba
- Succeeded by: Mohammed Balarabe Haladu

Director of the National Security Organisation
- In office September 1985 – July 1986
- President: Ibrahim Babangida
- Preceded by: Mohammed Lawal Rafindadi
- Succeeded by: NSO Dissolved

Chief of Defence Intelligence
- In office January 1985 – August 1985
- Preceded by: Position established
- Succeeded by: Halilu Akilu

Personal details
- Born: 18 May 1943 (age 83) Gusau, Northern Region, British Nigeria (now in Zamfara State, Nigeria)
- Party: Peoples Democratic Party
- Children: Mahdi Mohammed Gusau
- Education: Nigerian Defence Academy; Royal College of Defence Studies

Military service
- Allegiance: Nigeria
- Branch/service: Nigerian Army
- Years of service: 1964–1993
- Rank: Lieutenant general
- Battles/wars: Nigerian Civil War

Aliyu Mohammed Gusau (born 18 May 1943) is a Nigerian general and statesman. He has held several high level national security, military and intelligence offices, and has participated in several military coups, playing a central role in founding the Fourth Nigerian Republic.

He was most recently the Minister of Defence, and has served as National Security Adviser to three presidents; he was also the Chief of Army Staff during Ernest Shonekan and briefly Sani Abacha's regime, headed different intelligence agencies, and was commandant of the Nigerian Defence Academy.

== Early life ==
Aliyu Mohammed was born on 18 May 1943 in Gusau, Zamfara State. The army added his birthplace to his name, making "Aliyu Mohammed Gusau", to distinguish him from another General, Aliyu Mohammed. Although Aliyu does not himself use Gusau in his name, it has been widely adopted by the media.

== Military career ==
In 1964, he enrolled as an officer cadet at the Nigerian Defence Academy and was commissioned three years into the Nigerian Army as a second lieutenant. In 1967, he fought during the Nigerian Civil War.

He was Commander of 9 Infantry Brigade, Abeokuta (April 1976 – July 1978), Adjutant General of 2 Mechanised Division (July 1978 – September 1979) and Director of Personnel Services, Army Headquarters (October 1979 – November 1979).

=== Second Republic ===
From November 1979 to December 1983, Aliyu was Director of Military Intelligence (DMI). He played an important role in the coup that ousted President Shehu Shagari and the Second Nigerian Republic on 31 December 1983 and brought General Muhammadu Buhari to power.

== Military juntas of 1983–1993 ==
Following the coup he was proposed as overall head of Intelligence, with the support of Chief of Army Staff Ibrahim Babangida, but the appointment was opposed by Buhari. Buhari confirmed Shagari's appointee Muhammadu Lawal Rafindadi as director of the National Security Organization (NSO), and dismissed Aliyu from the DMI, replacing him with Colonel Halilu Akilu. Aliyu was sent on a training course at the Royal College of Defence Studies in the United Kingdom.

Aliyu was a player in the coup of 27 August 1985, when Babangida replaced Buhari. In the lead-up, due to the influence he had acquired as DMI, Aliyu was placed under intense surveillance and in turn placed pressure on the coup leaders to act swiftly.

After the coup, Aliyu was appointed Director of the Defence Intelligence Agency (DIA) and Acting Director-General of the National Security Organisation (NSO) from September 1985 to August 1986, then Coordinator on National Security from August 1986 to December 1989. He reorganised the security and intelligence apparatuses, which had fallen in disarray under Rafindadi during the Buhari regime, breaking up the NSO into three organisations: State Security Services (SSS), National Intelligence Agency (NIA) and the Defence Intelligence Agency (DIA).

Aliyu was appointed General Officer Commanding 2 Mechanised Division in Ibadan from December 1989 to August 1990; and Chief of Administration, Defence Headquarters, in Lagos from August 1990 to February 1992. He was Commandant of the Nigerian Defence Academy, Kaduna from February 1992 to January 1993.

Aliyu became National Security Advisor in January 1993, and was promoted to Chief of Army Staff when Babangida passed control to the short-lived civilian government of the Nigerian Third Republic in August 1993.

In November 1993, in a bid to consolidate his power General Sani Abacha removed Aliyu as Chief of Army Staff replacing him with General Chris Alli.

== Staying power ==
Retiring from the army, Aliyu became chairman & chief executive of Alpha Public Affairs Consultancy from December 1993 to May 1999. With wide influence in both civilian and military circles, Aliyu played a central role in ensuring that the transition to democracy in May 1999 went smoothly.

Aliyu was the National Security Advisor in the crucial period when former political office holders in the armed forces were retired in June 1999, helping Obasanjo assume control of the armed forces as a civilian President. He remained National Security Advisor during most of Obasanjo's presidency. He left office to compete in the 2006 People's Democratic Party (PDP) primaries for presidential candidate, coming third. The winner, Umaru Yar'Adua, went on to be elected president.

On 8 March 2010, Acting President Goodluck Jonathan announced that he was removing Major-General Sarki Mukhtar as National Security Adviser and replacing him with Aliyu. A few days later, Aliyu met with the service chiefs in Abuja to discuss the Jos crisis and the security situation in the country. There were rumours that a review of senior army and police assignments could be underway.

Speaking at a seminar in April 2010, Aliyu said the legal system seemed to promote crime and the law enforcement agencies appeared overwhelmed. He also said that efforts to fight corruption were perceived as selective and ineffective, and some of the agencies had credibility problems since their leaders had been accused of corruption. In April 2010, Aliyu announced his presidential nomination to be a candidate in the 2011 presidential elections.

== Personal life ==
His son Mahdi Mohammed Gusau (born 1981) served as deputy governor of Zamfara State from 2019 till his impeachment in 2022.

== Honours ==
=== National honours ===
Country	Decoration	Notes
Nigeria	Commander of the Order of the Federal Republic (CFR);	Third highest national honour in Nigeria.

=== Foreign honours ===
Country	Decoration	Notes
Germany	Grand Cross of the Order of Merit (OM);	National honour in Germany. Awarded for merit
South Korea	Order of National Security Merit;	"Outstanding meritorious services in the interest of national security"
South Africa	National Intelligence Service Medal, Gold	South African intelligence service medal
Ethiopia	Grand Collar of the Order of Emperor Haile Selassie	Ethiopian award named after Emperor Haile Selassie

== Legacy ==
=== Gusau Institute ===
Aliyu founded the Gusau Institute in Kaduna, donating his private library and publications, to the research centre to promote national development.
