= Hamza al-Mustapha =

Nigerian army officer (born 1960)

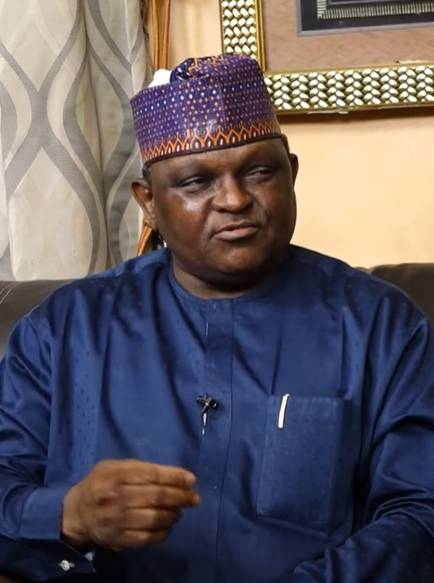
- Al-Mustapha in 2023
- Born: 27 July 1960 (age 66); Nguru, Northern Region, British Nigeria (now Nguru, Yobe State, Nigeria)
- Military career
- Allegiance: Nigeria
- Branch: Nigerian Army
- Years of service: 1983–1998
- Rank: Major
- Battles: Chadian-Libyan conflict Nigeria-Cameroon conflict Liberian Civil War; Sierra Leone Civil War

Hamza Al-Mustapha (born 27 July 1960) is a retired Nigerian Army major, intelligence officer and politician who served as Chief Security Officer to Head of State General Sani Abacha from 1993 until his death on 8 June 1998.

== Early life ==
Hamza Al-Mustapha was born into a Hausa family and educated in Nguru. He enrolled at the Nigerian Defence Academy in Kaduna and was commissioned into the Nigerian Army in 1983.

== Military career ==
From August 1985 to August 1990, Al-Mustapha was Aide-de-camp (ADC) (but recently clarified in an open television interview with Channels Television's Seun Okinbaloye that he wasn't ADC that he was the chief security officer) to Chief of Army Staff, General Sani Abacha. Both his principal and head of state, General Ibrahim Babangida had absolute confidence in his abilities, and entrusted him with exceptional powers, considerably greater than other officers who were nominally his superior. This further projected him as a strongman of the military hierarchy.

=== Military intelligence ===
Al-Mustapha was trained as a military intelligence operative. He held various command posts in the Ministry of Internal Affairs, Security Group of the Directorate of Military Intelligence (SG-DMI), 82 Division and Army Headquarters; Ministry of Defence and The Presidency.

He was also involved in counter-intelligence activities and at least two investigations of coup attempts; which brought him to the attention of General Sani Abacha. He also conducted operations in Chad, Liberia, Bakassi, Gambia and Sierra Leone. In his evidence before the Commission, Major Al-Mustapha emphasized that he had subscribed to an oath to protect the Head of State and his family as well as the Seat of Government.

== Abacha era ==
=== Regime security ===
General Sani Abacha seized power in 1993 and appointed al-Mustapha as his head of security from 17 November 1993 to 8 June 1998. In this role he was responsible for the security of the regime and established a number of elite military-security organisations. Other security outfits at the time were the Office of the National Security Adviser under Ismaila Gwarzo; National Intelligence Agency; Directorate of Military Intelligence; and the State Security Service. He was so respected and feared by even his superiors that former Minister of Works & Housing under the Abacha regime, Major-General Abdulkareem Adisa told the Oputa Panel that he had no regret kneeling down to ask Al-Mustapha to help him plead to General Abacha for forgiveness following their foiled coup attempt in December 1997.

=== Power politics ===
Al-Mustapha oversaw the reorganisation of the entire territory of Nigeria into six geopolitical zones, in this he cultivated a vast network of spies and informants across the federation;

- North Central: Benue State, Kogi State, Kwara State, Nasarawa State, Niger State, Plateau State and Federal Capital Territory, Nigeria.
- North East: Adamawa State, Bauchi State, Borno State, Gombe State, Taraba State and Yobe State.
- North West: Jigawa State, Kaduna State, Kano State, Katsina State, Kebbi State, Sokoto State and Zamfara State.
- South East: Abia State, Anambra State, Ebonyi State, Enugu State and Imo State.
- South South: Akwa Ibom State, Bayelsa State, Cross River State, Delta State, Edo State and Rivers State.
- South West: Ekiti State, Lagos State, Ogun State, Ondo State, Osun State and Oyo State.

=== Transfer of power ===
General Sani Abacha died on 8 June 1998, following his death al-Mustapha assembled the military hierarchy in order to avoid a succession crisis. General Abdulsalam Abubakar emerged as head of state on 9 June 1998 and al-Mustapha was removed from office and subsequently arrested on 21 October 1998 for crimes which included an alleged role in the assassination of Kudirat Abiola.

== Arrest and internment ==
=== Arrest ===
Following his October 1998 arrest, al-Mustapha was first held and questioned during the Oputa panel, then accused of plotting at least four coups from prison, before being moved to the Kirikiri Maximum Security Prison, where he was tortured for over a year. He was in chains and solitary confinement for over a year, allowed only a cup of water daily and subject to psychological torture. His private residences in Abuja, Kano and Yobe were looted by government operatives, his children's toys were burned in front of him to instil fear, his family was subject to numerous threats, and throughout his internment he was allowed to see his parents only twice - who later died. In May 2011, there were rumours that al-Mustapha had been murdered at the Kirikiri Maximum Security Prisons where he was being held, but these turned out to be untrue.

=== Acquittal ===
In 2007, there were appeals for al Mustapha's release including from former military president Ibrahim Babangida. On 21 December 2010, al-Mustapha and his co-defendants were acquitted of most charges. However, al-Mustapha was still not cleared of the alleged murder of Kudirat Abiola. In July 2011, the case was reopened. Hamza Al-Mustapha and his co-accused Lateef Sofolahan testified to their innocence of the murder charges. On 30 January 2012, the Lagos High Court subsequently found al-Mustapha guilty of the murder and he was sentenced to death by hanging. On 12 July 2013, The Court of Appeal in Lagos overturned the high court judgement and acquitted al-Mustapha of all murder charges of Kudirat Abiola. During the fifteen-year trial, al-Mustapha appeared before thirteen different judges and two magistrates.

=== Release from internment ===
Following his release, al-Mustapha moved to Kano. In January 2017, the Government of Lagos State filed an appeal with the Supreme Court of Nigeria, for the apex court to uphold the previous death by hanging verdict of the Lagos High Court.

In 2017, he made his political debut. With grassroots support and appeal to youth he founded the Green Party of Nigeria (GPN), and later unsuccessfully ran as the presidential candidate of the Peoples Party of Nigeria (PPN) during the 2019 presidential election, receiving approximately 0.02% of the vote. He ran again in 2023 under Action Alliance, but was legally disqualified after a dispute over whether his primary win over Samson Odupitan was legitimate. Nonetheless, he continued to campaign, splitting the Action Alliance into pro-Al-Mustapha and pro-Odupitan factions. He ultimately finished with approximately 0.06% of the vote.

== Charges ==
=== Targeted killings ===
In October 1998, he was charged with the June 1996 Kudirat Abiola murder, wife of the presidential candidate M.K.O. Abiola (who had died in jail in July 1998). At the trial the soldier, Sergeant Barnabas Jabila, said he was obeying orders from his superior, al-Mustapha.

Al Mustapha and four others were also charged with a 1996 attempt to murder Alex Ibru, publisher of The Guardian and Abacha's Minister of Internal Affairs. Another charge was laid against al-Mustapha for the attempted murder of former Chief of Naval Staff Isaac Porbeni.

=== Overthrow the government ===
On 1 April 2004, he was charged with being involved in a plot to overthrow the government. Allegedly, he had conspired to shoot down the presidential helicopter of President Olusegun Obasanjo using a surface-to-air missile that had been smuggled into the country from Benin.

=== Drug trafficking ===
As chief security officer to the former head of state, General Sani Abacha, al-Mustapha was accused of involvement in drug trafficking, using diplomatic pouches to transport the drugs.
