= Dikko =

Dikko is a name of Fulfulde origin. In Francophone countries, it is given as Dicko. It may refer to:

== People ==
Middle name

- Mohammed Dikko Abubakar, Nigerian policeman and former Inspector General of Police
- Muhammadu Dikko Yusufu, also known as MD Yusufu or MD Yusuf (1931–2015), Nigerian policeman, Inspector General of the Nigerian Police Force, public servant and politician

Surname

- Abdullahi Dikko (born 1960), Nigerian Comptroller-General of Nigerian Customs Service
- R.A.B. Dikko (1912–1977), Nigerian doctor and commissioner
- Muhammadu Dikko (1865-1944), the 47th "Sarki" (Emir) of Katsina (1906-1944)
- Umaru Dikko (1936–2014), Nigerian politician and minister, exiled in UK, subject of kidnapping attempt known as the Dikko Affair
- Umar dikko raddah(born 10 september 1969) politician, current Governor of Katsina state

== See also ==
- Dikko affair, joint Nigerian-Israeli attempt to kidnap UK-based Umaru Dikko, Nigerian former minister in 1984, and secretly transport him back to Nigeria in a diplomatic bag
