= Chief of Defence Intelligence (Nigeria) =

Defence intelligence office Nigeria

Chief of Defense Intelligence
- Incumbent; Lieutenant General Emmanuel Undiandeye since 19 June 2023
- Defence Intelligence Agency
- Member of: Nigerian Armed Forces; National Security Council
- Reports to: Minister of Defence
- Seat: Abuja, Nigeria
- Appointer: President of Nigeria
- Formation: June 1986
- First holder: Brigadier General Aliyu Mohammed Gusau
- Unofficial names: CDI

The chief of defence intelligence (CDI) is a Nigerian Military officer from any of the service branches who serves as the head of Nigeria's Defence Intelligence Agency. The CDI is appointed by the president of Nigeria and reports into the minister of defence.

== Chiefs of defence intelligence ==
Below is a list of the current and previous chiefs of defence intelligence

Chiefs of defence intelligence	Term of service	Defence branch
Brigadier General; Aliyu Mohammed Gusau	January 1985 – August 1985	Nigerian Army
Lieutenant Colonel; Haliru Akilu	August 1985 – July 1986	Nigerian Army
Rear Admiral; Babatunde Elegbede	July 1986 – January 1990	Nigerian Navy
Colonel; Haliru Akilu	January 1990 – September 1990	Nigerian Army
Group Captain; Idi Musa	September 1990 – December 1991	Nigerian Air Force
Major General; Ibrahim Dahiru Gumel	December 1991 – March 1995	Nigerian Army
Air Vice Marshal; Idi Musa	March 1995 – July 1999	Nigerian Air Force
Vice Admiral; Joseph Ajayi	July 1999 – September 2005	Nigerian Navy
Major General; A.M. Halidu-Giwa	December 2005 – August 2007	Nigerian Army
Major General; Mohammed Said	December 2005 – August 2007	Nigerian Army
Major General; Babagana Monguno	July 2009 – September 2011	Nigerian Army
Major General; Sani Yakubu Audu	September 2011 – February 2014	Nigerian Army
Rear Admiral; Gabriel Okoi	February 2014 – July 2015	Nigerian Navy
Air Vice Marshal; Monday Riku Morgan	July 2015 – January 2016	Nigerian Air Force
Major General; John Saduana Davies	January 2016 – July 2016	Nigerian Army
Air Vice Marshal; Mohammed Saliu Usman	July 2016 – February 2021	Nigerian Air Force
Major General; Samuel Adebayo	February 2021 – 19 June 2023	Nigerian Army
Lieutenant General Emmanuel Undiandeye	19 June 2023 – present	Nigerian Army
