= Babagana =

Babagana is a masculine given name. Notable people with the name include:

- Babagana Kingibe (born 1945), Nigerian diplomat and politician
- Babagana Monguno (born 1957), Nigerian general and politician
- Babagana Zulum (born 1969), Nigerian politician
