= Afakriya Gadzama =

Nigerian security officer

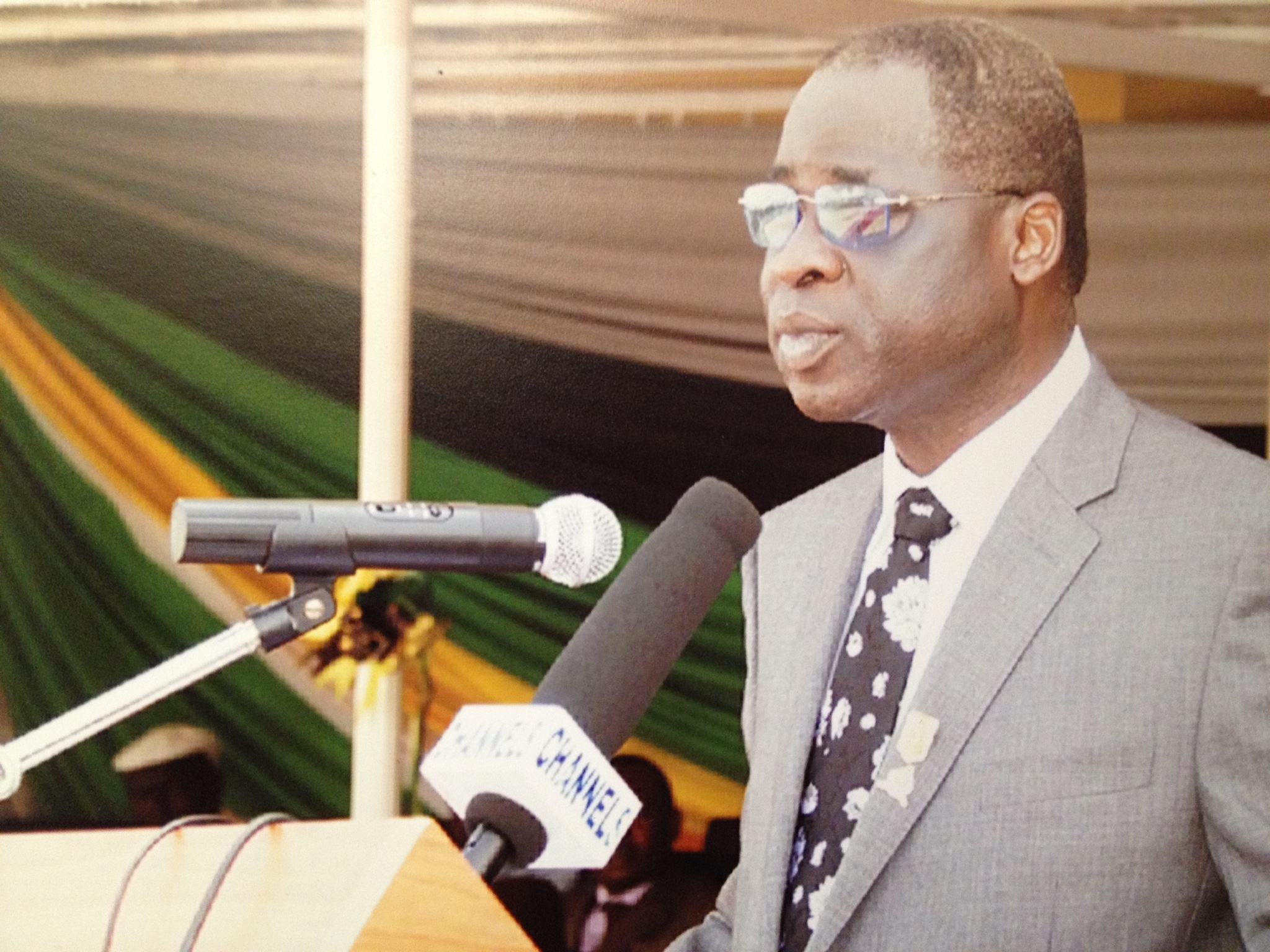

National Institute for Security Studies, Chairman
- Incumbent
- Assumed office December 2019

Director of State Security Service
- In office August 2007 – 7 September 2010
- President: Umaru Musa Yar'Adua; Goodluck Jonathan
- Preceded by: Kayode Are
- Succeeded by: Ita Ekpenyong

Personal details
- Born: 22 November 1953 (age 72) Lassa, Northern Region, British Nigeria (now Lassa, Nigeria)
- Education: Barewa College; Ahmadu Bello University

Afakriya Aduwa Gadzama mni OFR (22 November 1953) is a Nigerian security officer who is the current Chairman of the National Institute for Security Studies. He previously served as Director General of the State Security Service (SSS) under President Umaru Yar'Adua from August 2007 until September 2010.

== Background and education ==
Afakriya Aduwa Gadzama was born on 22 November 1953 at Lassa in Askira-Uba Local Government Area of Borno State Nigeria. He attended the prestigious Barewa College, Zaria, from 1968–1972, then School of Basic Studies, Zaria. He later proceeded to the Ahmadu Bello University, where he obtained his bachelor's degree (BA) in Political Science (1977). In 2001, Gadzama attended the Senior Executive Course at the National Institute for Policy and Strategic Studies (NIPSS) Kuru, Jos.

== Early career ==
Gadzama started his career in 1978 with the Ministry of Finance in Borno State and transferred to the National Security Organization as a Principal Officer in 1984. He rose through the ranks of the NSO and the subsequent State Security Service which was carved out of the NSO when it was dissolved.

== State Security Service ==
His postings at the State Security Service include:

- Director of Security, Plateau State (1989–1991)
- Director of Security, Federal Capital Territory (1991–1993)
- Director of Security, Kaduna (1993–1997)
- Director of Operations, SSS National Headquarters (1997–1998)
- Director of Programmes, SSS National Headquarters 1999
- Director of Intelligence (2001–2002)
- Director of Operations (2002–2003)
- Director of Administration and Logistics, National Headquarters (2004–2005)
- Director of Corporate Services, National Headquarters (2006–2007).

In August 2007, President Umaru Musa Yar'Adua appointed Gadzama as Director General of the agency. Gadzama was instrumental in President Yar Adua's Amnesty Program for militants in the Niger Delta region. In September 2010, Ita Ekpeyong replaced Gadzama as Director General of the SSS after President Goodluck Jonathan's mass dismissal of security chiefs.

== Later career ==
On December 16, 2019, Nigeria's President Muhammadu Buhari appointed Gadzama as the Chairman of the National Institute Policy and Security Studies.
