= Peter Nwaoduah =

Former Nigerian security agent head

Director of the State Security Service
- In office October 1992 – June 1998
- President: Ibrahim Babangida; Sani Abacha
- Preceded by: Albert Horsfall
- Succeeded by: Kayode Are

Personal details
- Born: South Eastern Region, Nigeria
- Website: www.dss.gov.ng/dss_dgss

Peter Chukwuemeka Nwaoduah is a Nigerian government executive. He served as Director General of the State Security Service (SSS) under General Sani Abacha. He headed the department from October 1992-1998, under Major Hamza al-Mustapha.

== Career ==
Nwadouah's appointment was considered well deserved because former head of state General Sani Abacha chose his appointees based on competence without religious or ethnic prejudice. Nwadouah was among many southerners appointed by Abacha who were part of the cabinet acclaimed as the best in the country's history. He served along with Lateef Jakande, Bamanga Tukur, Adamu Ciroma, Anthony Ani, Olu Onagoruwa, Abubakar Rimi, Walter Ofonagoro, Uche Chukwumerije, Baba Gana Kingibe (M.K.O. Abiola's running mate), Sarki Tafida, and Tom Ikimi.

His predecessor was Albert Horsfall and his successor is Colonel Kayode Are. He acquired his service residence in Asokoro, Abuja, in 1999.

== National honour ==
On 1 July 2010, Nwaoduah was conferred to the National Honour of the Order of the Federal Republic.
