= Global Concord (Nigeria) =

Global Concord is an Akwa Ibom based newspaper. Global Concord is known in Akwa Ibom for publication of controversial stories. The publisher of Global Concord is Unyime Ekwere. The local newspaper has published several controversial stories mostly political.

On July 24, 2013, Global Concord's office was raided by the SSS along with protesters and seized over 5,000 copies of newspaper that were to be circulated.
