= Kayode Are =

Nigerian Army Colonel

Colonel Lateef Kayode Are

Nigerian National Security Adviser
- Acting
- In office 18 September 2010 – 4 October 2010
- President: Goodluck Jonathan
- Preceded by: Aliyu Mohammed Gusau
- Succeeded by: Owoye Andrew Azazi

Director of the State Security Service
- In office May 1999 – August 2007
- President: Olusegun Obasanjo; Umaru Yar'Adua
- Preceded by: Peter Nwaoduah
- Succeeded by: Afakriya Gadzama

Personal details
- Education: Nigerian Defence Academy

Military service
- Allegiance: Nigeria
- Branch/service: Nigerian Army
- Years of service: 1974 - 1993
- Rank: Colonel

Lateef Kayode Are is a retired Nigerian Army Colonel who was Director General of the Nigerian State Security Service (SSS) from 1999 to 2007 and briefly served as National Security Adviser in 2010. Are served as an officer in the Directorate of Military Intelligence up until retirement by General Sani Abacha. Are was appointed as Director-General of the State Security Service by President Olusegun Obasanjo, served in that post throughout President Obasanjo's two terms (1999-2007), and was replaced by Afakiriya Gadzama, who was appointed in August 2007 by President Umaru Yar'Adua.

== Background and education ==
Are was commissioned as a 2nd Lieutenant in December 1974 from the Nigerian Defence Academy as part of the NDA Regular Course 12. He graduated among the best ten student officers and was deployed to the Nigerian Army Intelligence Corp following his graduation from the Defence Academy. Are's NDA Regular Course 12 mates included officers such as General Owoye Andrew Azazi, Colonel Sambo Dasuki, and Admiral Ganiyu Adekeye.

Are later graduated with a First Class Honours degree in Psychology in 1980 from the University of Ibadan where he won the University Senate prize, Faculty of Social Sciences prize and the Department of Psychology prize for best graduating student. He later obtained a master's degree in International Law and Diplomacy from the University of Lagos in 1987.

== Director General of the SSS ==
Are served with General Aliyu Gusau at the Directorate of Military Intelligence during Are's time in the army. In 1999, Gusau, the newly appointed National Security Adviser, recommended Are to President Olusegun Obasanjo, who appointed Are as Director General of the State Security Service. There is some speculation that Are and Obasanjo's Owu kinship played a role in Are's appointment as Director General.

== National Security Adviser ==
In April 2010, Are was appointed as Deputy National Security Adviser by President Goodluck Jonathan.

This was a newly created position.

When Aliyu Gusau resigned as National Security Advisor (NSA), Kayode Are took over as Acting NSA.

Jonathan relieved Are as NSA and appointed General Owoye Andrew Azazi as NSA, effective on 4 October 2010. The announcement of the change said "The President thanked the outgoing NSA for his services, and wished him well in his future endeavours".

Five years after the resignation, Are's residence in Ikoyi was raided by the Nigerian State Security Service.
