= 1983 Nigerian coup d'état =

1983 Nigerian military coup against Pres. Shehu Shagari; Muhammadu Buhari installed

Date	31 December 1983
Location	Nigeria
Result	Coup succeeds.: President Shehu Shagari is ousted by Maj-Gen Muhammadu Buhari, GOC 3rd Armored Division.

Belligerents
Democratically elected Federal Government of Nigeria	Armed Forces faction

Commanders and leaders
Shehu Shagari	Muhammadu Buhari

A military coup took place in Nigeria on 31 December 1983. It was coordinated by key officers of the Nigerian military and led to the ousting of the democratically elected government of President Shehu Shagari and the installation of Major General Muhammadu Buhari as head of state.

== Background ==
Tensions between the civilian and military aspects of Nigerian government were escalating. One major incident was when Major General Muhammadu Buhari, the commanding officer of the 3rd Division, cut off fuel and food supplies into neighboring Chad, an action caused by border disputes between Nigeria and Chad that was opposed by President Shehu Shagari. Buhari disregarded orders by Shagari to avoid entering Chadian territory, and his unit pursued Chadian intruders around 50 kilometers into Chad. This incident was one of the major contributing factors to the coup, as it placed the civilian government and military on opposite sides of a highly divisive issue.

Shortly before the coup, the director general of the National Security Organization, Umaru Shinkafi, detected communications that implicated several coup plots. However, the NSO was unable to intervene in these plots because of the tenuous and vague nature of the intelligence gathered.

== Coup details ==
Colonel Tunde Ogbeha was tasked by the coup plotters to negotiate the peaceful surrender of President Shagari's Brigade of Guards army unit. Ogbeha was unable to reach Colonel Bello Kaliel, the Commander of the Brigade of Guards and engaged in a Lagos-to-Abuja-and-back seeking game which made Kaliel suspicious. Brigadier Ibrahim Bako was given the responsibility of arresting President Shagari after Ogbeha's successful negotiation of a peaceful surrender. Unknown to Bako was that no such surrender had been negotiated. Additionally, details of the plot had not only been leaked to President Shagari but also to Captain Anyogo, and Lt Colonel Eboma of the Brigade of Guards mounted a defense of the presidential villa in anticipation of an attack. As expected, Brigadier Bako arrived at the Presidential villa to arrest President Shagari but President Shagari's guards were not pacified as expected. A firefight ensued leading to the killing of Brigadier Bako.

== Participants ==
- Major General Muhammadu Buhari (general officer commanding, 3rd Armored Division, Jos)
- MKO Abiola (business tycoon who financed the coup plot according to General Babangida)
- Major General Ibrahim Babangida (director of Army Staff duties and plans)
- Brigadier Ibrahim Bako (brigade commander)
- Brigadier Sani Abacha (commander, 9th Mechanized Brigade)
- Brigadier Tunde Idiagbon (military secretary, Army)
- Lt Colonel Aliyu Mohammed Gusau (director of military intelligence)
- Lt Colonel Halilu Akilu
- Lt Colonel David Mark
- Lt Colonel Tunde Ogbeha
- Major Sambo Dasuki (military assistant to the Chief of Army Staff, Lt-General Wushishi)
- Major Abdulmumini Aminu
- Major Lawan Gwadabe
- Major Mustapha Jokolo (senior instructor, Basawa Barracks – Zaria)
- Major Abubakar Umar

=== Additional notes on Buhari's role ===
General Buhari has denied his involvement in the December 1983 coup; however, the example of the late Major Daniel Bamidele betrays Buhari's complicity in the December 1983 coup. Nigerian military historians Max Siollun and Nowa Omoigui note that when Major Bamidele got wind of the coup to oust Shagari, Bamidele reported the issue up the chain of command to his GOC 3rd Armored Division (Major General Buhari) who was allegedly in on the plot. To prevent Bamidele from leaking the plot, Buhari ordered the arrest and detention of Bamidele for two weeks. Bamidele wasn't released until the successful execution of the coup. Learning from this unfortunate experience, Bamidele didn't report any rumors of the so-called Vatsa coup (between 1985 and 1986) and was executed for it. Bamidele's words to the Special Military Tribunal that tried and convicted him are:

"I heard of the 1983 coup planning, told my GOC General Buhari who detained me for two weeks in Lagos. Instead of a pat on the back, I received a stab. How then do you expect me to report this one? This trial marks the eclipse of my brilliant and unblemished career of 19 years. I fought in the civil war with the ability it pleased God to give me. It is unfortunate that I'm being convicted for something which I have had to stop on two occasions. This is not self adulation but a sincere summary of the qualities inherent in me. It is an irony of fate that the president of the tribunal who in 1964 felt that I was good enough to take training in the UK is now saddled with the duty of showing me the exit from the force and the world."

Additionally, in a 2015 interview, Sambo Dasuki alleges that he and two other military officers (co-conspirators) travelled to Jos to brief Major General Buhari, who was then the GOC of 3rd Armoured Division, on the status of planning for the 1983 coup.

Major General Buhari's Supreme Military Council (SMC) observed a minute of silence for the slain Brigadier Bako during the SMCs first meeting.

== See also ==
- Military coups in Nigeria
