= Baba Alakyo =

Nigerian herbalist, traditionalist and leader of the Ombatse militia group

- Born: Lega Lagu; 1937 (age 88–89); Nasarawa Egon, Nasarawa State, Nigeria
- Citizenship: Nigerian
- Occupation: Herbalist
- Known for: Ombatse militia group

Baba Alakyo (born 1937) is a Nigerian herbalist, traditionalist and leader of the Ombatse militia group.

== Militant activities ==
He was born at Alakyo village in Nasarawa Egon, a local government area of Nasarawa State, northern Nigeria where he coordinates the militia group, Ombatse militia group. He led the May 2013 attack that resulted in the killing of 74 police officers and 10 officers of the State Security Service. On November 17, 2014, it was reported that he was killed by unknown gunmen suspected to be Fulani herdsmen, a claim that was refuted by the legal adviser to the Ombatse group, Barr. Zachary Zamani Alumaga.
