= Don Waney =

Nigerian cultist (died 2018)

Johnson Igwedibia popularly known as Don Waney was a Nigerian cultist who terrorised Rivers State. He was killed by a joint operation between the Nigerian Army and the State Security Service in 2018 in the border between Rivers state and Imo state.
