= Ombatse militia group =

Militia group in northern Nigeria

- Leader: Baba Alakyo
- Headquarters: Nasarawa State
- Active regions: Nasarawa Egon
- Ideology: Regionalism
- Wars: Nasarawa State Ethnic Conflict

The Ombatse group is a militia group in Nasarawa Egon, a Local Government Area of Nasarawa State, northern Nigeria. In May 2013, the group was reported to have killed 74 police officers and 10 State Security Service officers. The deadly attack was led by the leader of the group, Baba Alakyo, the chief priest of Alakyo Village of Nasarawa Egon.

== Controversies ==
There are controversies on whether there is a link between the militia group and the Boko Haram Islamic insurgents in northeastern Nigeria but there seems to be no clear evidence of any relationship between the groups. On November 17, 2014, it was reported that the leader of the militia group, Baba Alakyo was killed by unknown gunmen suspected to be Fulani herdsmen, a claim that was refuted by the legal adviser to the Ombatse group, Zachary Zamani Alumaga.
