= Babatunde Elegbede =

Vice Admiral Muftau Babatunde Elegbede

Chief of Defence Intelligence Agency
- In office July 1986 – January 1990
- Preceded by: Lt Col Haliru Akilu
- Succeeded by: Col Haliru Akilu

Governor of Cross River State
- In office July 1978 – October 1979
- Preceded by: Paul Omu
- Succeeded by: Clement Isong

Personal details
- Born: August 13, 1939 Nigeria
- Died: June 19, 1994 (aged 54) Lagos, Nigeria
- Cause of death: Assassination

Military service
- Allegiance: Nigeria
- Branch/service: Nigerian Navy
- Rank: Vice Admiral

Muftau Adegoke Babatunde Elegbede// (13 August 1939 – 19 June 1994) or Tunde Elegbede was Chief of Nigeria's Defence Intelligence Agency from July 1986 to January 1990 and Military Governor of Cross River State, Nigeria between July 1978 and October 1979.

Elegbede attended the Methodist Boys High School in Lagos.

== Military career ==
As a Navy Captain, Elegbede was appointed Military Governor of Cross River State between 28 July 1978 and 30 September 1979, when he handed over power to the elected civilian governor Clement Isong at the start of the Nigerian Second Republic. During his tenure, the Maritime Academy of Nigeria was established at Oron (now in Akwa Ibom State).

During the military regime of General Muhammadu Buhari that followed the Second Republic after a 31 December 1983 coup, Elegbede was Chairman of the Kaduna Zone military tribunal, which was set up to try public officers from the previous civilian regime who had been accused of embezzling public funds. He was appointed director of the Defence Intelligence Agency, and was later head of administration in Defence Headquarters under General Ibrahim Babangida. In September 1985, Commodore Elegbede was Flag Officer Commanding, Sea Training Command. He was a member of Babangida's Armed Forces Ruling Council from 1983 to 1993.

== Death ==
Elegbede was gunned down by gunmen on 19 June 1994 along the Gbagada/Owonshoki expressway in Lagos, hit by more than 70 automatic rifle bullets. In July 2001, three of the seven suspected robbers were formally charged. However, as of September 2009, nobody had been convicted of the murder.
