= Ayo Oke =

Former director general of Nigeria's National Intelligence Agency

Ayo Oke is the former director general of Nigeria's National Intelligence Agency (NIA), appointed by then president Goodluck Jonathan on 7 November 2013.

== Early life and career ==
Ayo Oke was born in Oyo state. Oke was previously the Director (Regions) at the headquarters of the NIA, and before that Nigeria's ambassador to the Commonwealth Secretariat in London. He succeeded Ezekiel Olaniyi Oladeji as director general of Nigeria's National Intelligence Agency in November 2013.

== Controversy ==
=== NIA Funds ===
In April 2017, Oke was suspended by president Muhammadu Buhari after anti-corruption officers from the Economic and Financial Crimes Commission found more than US$43 million (£34m) in an apartment at Osborne Towers, Ikoyi, Lagos. On 30 October, Oke was finally dismissed by the Nigerian President, Muhammadu Buhari after consideration of the report of the investigative committee headed by the Vice President.

In June 2023, Premium Times citing unnamed “inside sources” reported that the NIA DG Ahmed Abubakar and the chairman of the EFCC Abdul Rasheed Bawa met and resolved to terminate the legal proceeding against Oke in the “interest of national security”. The resolution was then presented to President Muhammadu Buhari who approved it and ordered the termination of the case before the expiration of his tenure.

=== 2019 Arrest Warrant and Court Charges ===
In 2019, the long-running investigation into the "Ikoyi Gate" funds escalated. On February 7, the Federal High Court in Lagos issued a warrant for the arrest of Ayodele Oke and his wife, Folashade Oke who served as Director of Finance in NIA, following an application by the Economic and Financial Crimes Commission (EFCC). The couple failed to respond to a court summons, and the EFCC subsequently declared them wanted. Media reported that just before a scheduled court appearance, Oke and his wife left Nigeria, reportedly for medical treatment; their location was not publicly known at the time. The court charges were related to the theft and laundering of public money. The EFCC formally charged the couple in connection to the $43 million discovered in 2017. Furthermore, an additional charge was filed relating to an alleged diversion of $160 million from the Nigerian federal government for personal use. This development marked a significant escalation from Oke's 2017 dismissal, moving the allegations into the formal judicial system. On 9 June 2023, the case was struck out by Justice Chukwujekwu Aneke of the Federal High Court in Ikoyi, Lagos following prosecutor's (EFCC) motion to withdraw the case.

=== Ambassadorial nomination ===
In October 2025, President Bola Tinubu nominated Ayo Oke, alongside others, for appointment as a federal ambassador-designate. His nomination, which requires confirmation by the Nigerian Senate, brought renewed media attention to the Ikoyi Gate scandal and the investigations that led to his dismissal from the NIA.
