= National Security Organization =

Nigerian intelligence agency

Agency overview
- Formed: 1976
- Dissolved: 1986
- Headquarters: Lagos, Nigeria

The National Security Organization (NSO) of Nigeria, or Nigerian Security Organization, was created under Decree number 27 of 1976 by the military regime of General Olusegun Obasanjo, after the failed Dimka coup which claimed the life of former Head of State General Murtala Mohammed. The NSO was given a mandate of co-ordinating Internal Security, Foreign Intelligence and counterintelligence activities. It was charged with the detection and prevention of any crime against the security of the state, with the protection of classified materials, and with carrying out any other security missions assigned by the president.

During the time of the military regime, and continuing through the Nigerian Second Republic, the NSO was accused of carrying out systematic and widespread human rights abuses, especially of those seen to be critical of the government. One dissident has called them a "Gestapo in Black".

== Directors General of the NSO ==
Directors General of the NSO		Term of Service
Colonel Abdullahi Mohammed	March 1976	October 1979
Umaru Shinkafi	October 1979	December 1983
Mohammed Lawal Rafindadi	January 1984	August 1985
Brigadier-General Aliyu Mohammed Gusau	September 1985	July 1986

== Origins ==
=== Dimka coup ===
The NSO was created as a fall-out of the Dimka coup. Prior to the coup, internal security and intelligence was handled by the police Special Branch, a Secret Police, while external intelligence was conducted by the Research Department (RD), a unit of the External Affairs ministry. The Special Branch had failed to obtain intelligence about the coup and the coup plotters before the coup was executed; the inspector general of police at the time MD Yussuf excused this failure as the inability of the Special Branch to police the military. The police simply lacked the legal backing to conduct intelligence operations on the military. At the time, there were rumours making the rounds alleging that a former head of state General Yakubu Gowon had planned the coup form his hideout in exile. Gowon had been ousted in a bloodless coup led by the late Murtala Mohammed while he was in Uganda attending a meeting of the Organization of African Unity (OAU), and had taken up temporary asylum in Togo as at the time of the coup. The ringleader of the coup plotters was Lieutenant colonel Buka Suka Dimka, an in-law of Gowon and fellow member of the Angas ethnic group in Plateau State. Dimka had visited Gowon in exile in the UK and under interrogation claimed to have received Gowon's blessing for the coup; Gowon denied ever discussing the coup with him. The rumours of Gowon's involvement though unsubstantiated might have eroded whatever confidence the executive had in the RD as an external intelligence agency.

=== NSO establishment ===
The new head of state, General Olusegun Obasanjo, created the NSO by merging the Special Branch with the RD and appointed Colonel Abdullahi Mohammed, a former director of Military Intelligence (DMI) as its first director general. The new NSO set up offices in the 19 states of the federation and had its headquarters in the state house annexe in Lagos. The agency later moved into its permanent headquarters office space at 15, Awolowo road, Ikoyi, Lagos. This address also later served as the first headquarters of the successor to the NSO, the State Security Service. The most recent occupant of this same address is the Economic and Financial Crimes Commission, EFCC.

== 1976–1979 ==
In the early days of the NSO, the agency was staffed by a mix of military intelligence officers, some fresh recruits, officers of the RD and former police Special Branch officers among whom was the young Albert Horsfall. The new agency was administered along a directorate structure; directorates included operations, external intelligence (Research Department), protective security (cabinet security office), internal security, finance and administration and legal services. The primary objective during this period was the protection of the Head of State and the junta from both internal and external threats.

The external security and intelligence activities of the NSO were centred around Nigeria's rising profile as an Organization of Petroleum Exporting Countries (OPEC) member and how this affected the interests of foreign powers in Nigeria, also the NSO helped articulate the Nigerian government's foreign policy as it concerned Africa in the anti-colonial and anti-apartheid struggle. In this role, the NSO maintained contact with various rebel leaders in the Frontline States of Southern Africa, the agency channeled funds to these individuals and groups and also provided them with arms and training. Some of the beneficiaries of this program include the African National Congress (ANC) in their guerilla war against white minority rule in South Africa, Robert Mugabe's Zimbabwe African National Liberation Army and Joshua Nkomo's Zimbabwe People's Revolutionary Army, both in the Rhodesian Bush War.

The biggest internal threat was from the restive military, the country's economy was experiencing massive growth due to the oil boom of the 70's. There were civilian dissidents, but the military had been blighted by the series of coups, counter coups and the Nigerian Civil War, there was widespread nepotism, promotions had been political and a new system of patronage was also introduced where the successful coup plotters and their kinsmen got choice government positions and those who were seen as outsiders were either summarily retired or arrested on trumped up charges of coup-plotting. Most of the internal security activities of the NSO during this period were focused on checkmating military and their propensity for coup plotting, the DMI under then Colonel Aliyu Mohammed Gusau was relegated in the national security hierarchy and its influence greatly curtailed. This focus on the military greatly limited the visibility of the NSO in the eyes of the public during this period. In the civil sphere, student protests and activism were a major concern of the NSO, a government crackdown on student activism led to the proscription of the National Union of Nigerian Students (NUNS) in 1978 and the arrest and detention of its members and lawyer, Chief Gani Fawehinmi.

In 1988, Nobel Laureate Wole Soyinka a notable human rights campaigner received a letter from an inmate of a previously unknown ultra-secret detention facility, he gave the letter to the Civil Liberties Organization (CLO) to investigate. The secret detention center was later discovered on Ita-Oko Island, a remote island in the Lekki Lagoon in the east of Lagos. The Ita-Oko detention centre was a prison colony run by the NSO where mostly political prisoners were held. The island was totally cut off from all civilisation, it was only accessible by helicopter or boat and the waters surrounding it were crocodile-infested. The facility was established in 1978 under the cover of a farm settlement by the Ministry of Agriculture. In a letter he wrote to the New York Times after the paper broke the story of the Island prison's existence, Olusegun Obasanjo justified its existence thus; "Ita Oko was established as a farm settlement during the implementation of Operation Feed the Nation, which aimed at the increase of food production. It was provided with boreholes, an electric generating plant and a medical facility. It aimed at decriminalizing people – Nigerians and non-Nigerians – who refused to work, even though work was available..."

Just before General Olusegun Obasanjo handed over power to the civilian regime of Shehu Shagari, the NSO started a program of infiltrating government agencies and establishments that were to be inherited by the new civilian administration. The NSO at this time was still a largely military oriented agency, which still had a serving army officer as its director-general and the outgoing military administration was largely suspicious of the incoming civilians. This situation led to the NSO posting active duty operatives under cover within the administrative structure to be inherited by the civilian administration with a view to gathering first hand intelligence on the daily operations of the new administration. A former special adviser to President Shehu Shagari on National Assembly matters, Tanko Yakasai remembered meeting two such operatives during his time in detention at the SSS headquarters during the Babangida regime. One of the operatives was a messenger in the office of Dr. Joseph Wayas, the second republic senate president while the other worked as a personal assistant to Bello Maitama Yusuf, the minister of commerce in the Shagari administration. One of the operatives revealed the objective and scope of the operation to Yakasai, informing him that their cover had been established before the new administration took over and also that they had been posted to various government ministries.

== Second Republic (1979-1983) ==
=== Transition to civilian rule ===
Keeping to its promise, the military junta headed by General Olusegun Obasanjo conducted elections and power was handed over to a civilian administration headed by Shehu Shagari on 1 October 1979. After the handing over, all military officers who had served under the previous military regime retired voluntarily from the military; the new government then appointed Umaru Shinkafi a former commissioner of police in Oyo state, as the new director general of the NSO.

The Shinkafi-led NSO had the difficult task of transitioning from a military era secret police organisation to an organisation that functioned in a democracy and which also respected the constitution. During the second republic, there was a reduction in the number of human rights abuses committed by the NSO, though their overall human rights record still remained poor. Political parties and opposition groups complained of harassment by the NSO, particularly the Unity Party of Nigeria (UPN) headed by Chief Obafemi Awolowo – a keen rival of the party in power, the National Party of Nigeria (NPN) – was constantly hounded by the NSO. Shinkafi explained these accusations in an interview; "Before the military intervention we had the UPN, headed by Chief Obafemi Awolowo. We had the GNPP and the opposition parties. The ruling party at the centre was, of course, the National Party of Nigeria (NPN), headed by Shehu Shagari. It was feared that the operations of the NSO were slanted against the opposition parties, particularly the UPN. For this reason, people in the opposition parties tended to be afraid of the NSO and they looked at it as a terror organisation".

=== Maitatsine riots and intelligence failures ===
In 1980, one of the NSO's bigger intelligence gaffs was brought to light in the wake of the Maitatsine riots in Kano. The riots in which 4,177 people lost their lives were started by the Maitasine sect, an Islamic sect founded on the teachings of the late Malam Muhammadu Marwa alias Allah Ta-Tsine or Maitatsine. Marwa, a Cameroonian preacher, was deported from Nigeria in 1960 because of his fundamentalist teachings. Before the riots broke out, the NSO has successfully infiltrated the organisation but they were still unable to predict the violent riots sparked by the group. The riots were subsequently put down with much violence by both the police and the army. The Maitatsine uprising served as a springboard for several other fundamentalist uprisings in the north of the country including the more recent Boko Haram insurgency in Nigeria. In 1982 a similar riot to the 1980 Kano riots broke out in Bulumkuttu, near Maiduguri and in Kaduna all of which displayed similarities with the Kano riots.

The NSO under Shinkafi also dealt with matters of illegal immigration, one very controversial case was the deportation of Abdurrahman Shugaba Darman, the house majority leader of the Great Nigeria People's Party (GNPP) in the Borno State House of Assembly over an alleged assassination plot against the president with the aid of Chadian refugees. Though Shagari denied that the deportation had anything to do with the alleged assassination plot, it had all the hallmarks of a political witch hunt. There was also the case of Zanni Bukar Mandara, a military food contractor who was charged and convicted for treason. Mandara had been complaining to some soldiers that the economy was no longer what it used to be and that the country was drifting to a point where a change was needed. Mandara was arrested and charged by the NSO for plotting to overthrow the government of President Shagari. Such sentiment was common at the time and Mandara was only unfortunate that his indiscretion was made in the company of soldiers.

=== Foreign policy and intelligence operations ===
The NSO during this time continued to implement Nigeria's foreign policy objectives in Africa including her support for the various independence struggles in Africa. The Research Department continued to conduct foreign intelligence operations through its embassies abroad, though with modest achievements. In 1981, it was alleged that a senior Nigerian military officer working in the military headquarters stole the Nigerian battle plans for the first Bakassi war with Cameroon and passed it along to French Intelligence who shared it with the Cameroonians. This intelligence coup weakened Nigeria's willingness to fight and forced it to the negotiation table; it was a great humiliation and the NSO had failed to stop it.

Umaru Shinkafi in a libel lawsuit he filed against Umaru Dikko – the former transport minister in the Shagari cabinet – had alleged that the NSO had indeed informed Shagari about the impending Buhari coup in 1983. Dikko had earlier petitioned the Justice Oputa panel where he alleged amongst other things that Shinkafi had conspired with the coup plotters and hence withheld information about the coup from the President. One of Umaru Shinkafi's aides, Femi Fani-Kayode, has said that President Shagari failed to act on the security reports he had been given on the coup plotters, Fani-Kayode alleged that President Shagari had only called the coup plotters to ask them if what he was being told about them was true which they denied. The coup plotters on their part asked that he dropped some ministers including his in-law, Umaru Dikko that they had alleged were corrupt but Shagari flatly refused. Instead, Shagari decided to rely on the false assurance that the ring leaders were "Northern boys" who wouldn't risk overthrowing an elected government headed by a northerner, he was wrong. The situation had been exacerbated by Umaru Dikko's meddling in internal security and his spying on military officers. President Shagari had admitted to warning Dikko off meddling in affairs that did not concern him, some of which included changing General Buhari's posting from Lagos to Jos because he doubted Buhari's loyalty. In November 1983, Shinkafi had warned Shagari after he had met with General Buhari in Jos at the request of Shagari, this was in a bid to investigate rumours of a coup plot that Solomon Lar, the governor of Plateau State had informed Shagari about. Shagari had claimed that a lieutenant-colonel was arrested while visiting army formations in the country to promote a coup, he also alleged that the Directorate of Military Intelligence (DMI) was perceived to be dragging its feet on the matter, hence he asked that the NSO take custody of the suspect and take over the investigation. While the investigation was ongoing, the coup was executed. Coincidentally, Shinkafi resigned his appointment as the DG of the NSO in December 1983, a month before the coup took place; he had resigned ostensibly on health grounds. Shinkafi was later recalled by one of the ring leaders of the Buhari coup, General Ibrahim Babangida after Bababgida himself had toppled Buhari in another successful coup in 1985, to probe the activities of the NSO under his successor, Lawal Rafindadi.

== 1983–1985 ==
=== Mohammed Lawal Rafindadi's tenure ===
After Umaru Shinkafi's sudden resignation, President Shagari immediately appointed Mohammed Lawal Rafindadi as the new NSO Director General (DG). Rafindadi was a career diplomat and pioneer officer in the Research Department intelligence unit. Unlike Shinkafi whose background was in the Nigerian police Rafindadi was an experienced intelligence officer with several foreign postings including the United Kingdom, Republic of Ireland and Germany. Not considering his relatively short stay in office, Lawal Rafindadi was the most controversial director general of the NSO because of activities during his tenure and after he had been removed from office. The NSO definitely achieved the most notoriety under the leadership of Lawal Rafindadi, it has been alleged in some quarters that it was only General Buhari, Tunde Idiagbon and the director general of the NSO that ran the government; "the NSO was superior to all other intelligence organizations".

One month after Shagari nominated Rafindadi as the DG of the NSO, on 31 December 1983, General Muhamudu Buhari toppled the civilian administration of Shehu Shagari in a military coup. Surprisingly, Rafindadi was confirmed as DG NSO by the new regime even though Babangida had tipped the DMI boss Col. Aliyu Mohammed for the position. Rafindadi, a Katsina native like Buhari had been described as belonging to the "Kaduna Mafia", a powerful group of northern elite who attended elite schools in Kaduna, "..the elite mobsters move to positions and transactions, and their main goal is to secure the supremacy of Islam in northern Nigeria for good. This requires an alliance with the army, dominated since colonial times by men from the north".

=== Transition to military rule and repressions ===
Rafindadi quickly settled down to his job as the DG of the NSO aware of the distrust the military had of him and his organisation and also of the fierce rivalry that existed between himself and his opposite in the DMI, Mohammed Gusau. The Buhari government in prosecuting its war on corruption gave the NSO unprecedented powers of arrest and detention, the NSO was no longer the tame organisation it had been under the civilian government. On 3 February 1984, NSO officers arrested Marie McBroom, an American businesswoman at gunpoint. McBroom had been in the country during the December coup and had stayed behind to conclude several deals in foodstuff and fuel for her new import/export firm. McBroom was detained alongside another businesswoman Dorothy Davies who was arrested on similar charges of attempting to negotiate the purchase of crude oil and gasoline without first obtaining an export license, they were initially held at an interrogation cell at NSO headquarters before being transferred to Kirikiri prison later on. Davies was released and deported after 40 days in detention, McBroom was not that lucky she was held for nine months before she was finally arraigned before a four-man military panel on 30 November.

The regime promulgated the State Security (Detention of Persons) Decree Number 2 of 1984, which gave the NSO the power to detain anyone suspected to be a security risk indefinitely. Detention under decree 2 was in 3-month tranches renewable at expiry. Another draconian decree was the Decree Number 4 which made it a punishable offence for anyone to publish any material deemed embarrassing to a government official, two journalists from The Guardian newspapers, Nduka Irabor and Tunde Thompson were jailed under this decree. On 11 April 1984, NSO operatives arrested Irabor and Thompson. They were tried by a military tribunal headed by Justice Olalere Ayinde and charges of falsely accusing public officers of the Federal Government. This was sequel to the summons issued by the Special Military Tribunal. The summons given to them on 2 June 1984 read: Form 2 Public Officers (Protection Against False Accusation) Decree No. 4 of 1984 summon to accused. "That you Tunde Thompson and Nduka Iraboh of The Guardian Newspaper, Limited, Rutam House, Isolo on April 1, 1984 at Rutam House, Isolo in Lagos, did publish “False statement contrary to section 1(1) of the Decree No. 4 of 1984. You are therefore summoned to appear before the Tribunal mentioned above sitting at Federal High Court on the 4th day of June at the hour of 9.00 a.m in the forenoon to answer the said complaint". Also accused along with the men was their employer, Guardian Newspapers Limited.

The NSO became particularly notorious during Buhari's so called War Against Indiscipline crackdown in spring 1984. A series of repressive measures, led by NSO chief Mohammed Lawal Rafindadi, was carried out. Of these, repression against journalists, opposition figures, government officials (the Foreign Ministry saw a purge of those considered "disloyal") and the a 25-month imprisonment of musician Fela Ransome-Kuti are especially remembered.

In 1984, Rafindadi and the NSO were embrollied in controversy when the Emir of Gwandu (father of Buhari's ADC Major Mustapha Jokolo) and his entourage were allegedly allowed to clear 53 suitcases through customs on arrival from a foreign trip. Atiku Abubakar, then the customs area administrator at the Murtala Mohammed International Airport went on air to announce the incident in an apparent move to take credit and at the same time discredit his boss Abubakar Musa, the director of customs. Because of the impending currency change in the country at the time, the press went to town with a story alleging that the suitcases had contained hard currency smuggled into the country. The actual culprit at the time was Dahiru Waziri, a friend of Rafindadi who had just returned with his family from a posting in Saudi Arabia to resume as the chief of protocol in the state house. Waziri had flown in on the same aircraft as the Emir of Gwandu and his luggage had been collected directly from the aircraft by a protocol officer in the state house and ferried directly to the state house without passing through customs. Another member of the Emir of Gwandu's party was Buhari's half brother, which led to the Emir of Daura's (Daura is Buhari's hometown) name being mentioned originally in the press instead of the Emir of Gwandu in an attempt to implicate the Head of State in the affair. In an attempt to protect his friend, Rafindadi later claimed that it was he who had received the suitcases on behalf of a colleague in the diplomatic service and that the suitcases were to have been ostensibly filled with personal effects and not hard currency as alleged by the media.

=== Dikko affair ===
The NSO was also implicated in the much publicised "Dikko Affair" of 1984. The Dikko Affair was an unsuccessful attempt by the NSO and the Israeli businessman Elisha Cohen to kidnap and repatriate the second republic transport minister, Umaru Dikko from the United Kingdom where he had fled after the 1983 Buhari coup. Elisha Cohen had been doing business in Nigeria since the 60's as the country representative of Solel Boneh, an Israeli construction company. Cohen built up contacts among the senior officers in the Nigerian military including General Olusegun Obasanjo, in the aftermath of the attempt it was claimed in some quarters that Obasanjo's friend General T.Y. Danjuma had been instrumental in facilitating the mission. Cohen had impressed his Nigerian Military friends with stories of his ties to the Israeli intelligence services which were inaccurate and also unverifiable at the time because Nigeria had cut off diplomatic ties with Israel in solidarity with the OAU in the wake of the 1967 Israeli attack on Egypt. His claims were described by an associate who knew him during this period thus; "Cohen knew how to impress...He gave his listeners – Israelis and especially Nigerians – the feeling that he was a mystery man. He let it be understood that he was connected to the Mossad and the Shin Bet intelligence services or maybe even represented them in Nigeria. Among other things, he related that he worked on behalf of the Mossad in North Africa. Most of the Israelis were not very impressed by his hints and most of us understood that this was just fake showing off. But on the Nigerian army officers this made a great impression. They believed him." Cohen excitedly started planning the mission, "...for him, this was the fulfillment of all he dreamed of being and wasn't: an international conspirator and secret hush-hush missions..." Cohen assembled a team with funds provided by the Nigerian government while Major Mohammed Yussuf of the DMI was assigned to the team by the NSO. The plan was foiled when Dikko's private secretary saw members of the team abduct Dikko from the front of his house in broad daylight, she immediately alerted the police. The fall out of the failed kidnap attempt was immense, it led to a diplomatic tit-tat game of sanctions and a souring of relations between the United Kingdom and Nigeria, the international condemnation of the criminal act further tarnished the image of the new regime. The kidnap plan was known to only a few people in the intelligence services and the military, the Office of the Head of State and the DG of the NSO were its principal architects. Rafindadi's deputy, Chief Albert Horsfall had denied any knowledge of the plot.

Lawal Rafindadi's tenure as the DG of the NSO was plagued by arbitrary arrests and detentions of anybody suspected of being a threat to the regime, imagined or otherwise. This attitude crept down the ranks of the NSO and led to heavy handedness among some of the agency's operatives. A case in point is that of Brigadier Abbas Wali, a former defence attaché to the UK and Adjutant-General of the Nigerian Army. Wali was arrested in Kano by a NSO operative named Bishara and detained at the NSO office for a week without anyone knowing about the arrest including the DG of the agency, Lawal Rafindai and his deputy Albert Horsfall.

The military was not spared by the NSO either, the agency investigated Col. Aliyu Mohammed of the DMI and found him to be complicit in an import license racket, he was subsequently compulsorily retired from the army after six months in detention. During this period, Aliyu's friend and superior, Ibrahim Babangida also came under the scrutiny of the NSO, this arose because of a business dealing he and his brother in-law Sunny okogwu were involved in. Babangida and his brother in-law had wanted to set up a military hardware company called 'Black Gold' in Kaduna. The then military governor of the state, Air Vice-Marshal Usman Mu'azu wrote to the Supreme Military Council (SMC) explaining that the project was a national security risk and requested guidance on the matter. The SMC then referred the matter to the NSO for investigation. Rafindadi in his deposition to the Oputa Panel in November 2000 alleged that even before the NSO had commenced their investigations, Babangida brought a letter to the late Major-General Tunde Idiagbon, then chief of staff, Supreme Headquarters. The letter was supposed to be a clearance letter for the project under investigation purportedly written by the previous DG of the NSO, Umaru Shinkafi. Upon examination by the NSO, it turned out that the letter was actually written during Rafindadi's tenure as DG NSO, the name of the officer that signed the letter was fake and the letter was declared as a forgery. In the "Black Gold" affair, Buhari and Idiagbon had finally found a very good excuse to rid themselves of Babangida, he was slated for retirement and Idiagbon travelled to Mecca for the Hajj. Babangida, sensing the imminent end was left with no choice than to seize the initiative by planning and executing the August 1985 coup. A contemporary account from the Supreme Military Council (SMC) meeting that deliberated on the case was given by Femi Segun, a protocol officer in the state house at the time. Femi Segun recalls that "...IBB (Ibrahim Babangida) was asked to step out of the meeting which was going on because they wanted to discuss about him. For about three hours, IBB, as the then chief of army staff was just walking up and down outside without shoes and cap thinking seriously. We didn't know what was going on but it was clear that he was asked to step out of the meeting. A few days later, he staged a palace coup".

The NSO under Rafindadi began a wire tapping and eavesdropping program where the telephone conversations of government officials, dissidents and military officials including SMC members were being listened to. Rafindadi also used his position as DG NSO and a member of the SMC to initiate a purge of senior officers in the diplomatic service for no good reason, many lost their jobs and entitlements. The NSO was also not spared from Rafindadi's purges, some officers inherited from the Shinkafi era were summarily retired, an example was Peter Odukwe, the deputy director general of the agency.

=== Downfall and aftermath ===
Rafindadi's reign as the head of the infamous NSO came to an end with the August 1985 Babangida coup. Unfortunately for Rafindadi and the NSO, they were unable to predict the coup, the NSO might also have been lulled into a false sense of security by the SMC's indictment of Babangida on the Black Gold project. The NSO might also have been overwhelmed by the steady stream of coup rumours being manufactured by the DMI under Haliru Akilu, the DMI also planted a story that Col. Aliyu Mohammed was conspiring with some officers to overthrow the government, Aliyu had a very good motive for doing so which was the need to pay back the Buhari government and also to deal with Rafinadi; it was Rafindadi and his NSO who had sealed Aliyu's fate in the import scandal. As a consequence, Rafindadi might have focused too much of the NSO's time and resources on Aliyu and the many phantom coups that Akilu had been pushing out; a ruse to protect his fellow conspirators in the August 1985 coup.

With the arrival of Babangida as the new Head of State, Rafindadi was expectedly removed as DG of the NSO and detained for 40 months under house arrest at the Lagos Garrison Command (LGC) headquarters on kofo Abayomi road, in Lagos. The new regime opened up the NSO detention centre in Lagos to the press and released 101 detainees that included the likes of Senator Gbenga Ogunniya, Femi Falana and Folu Olamiti, the editor of the Sunday Tribune who was detained under decree 4; one detainee was reported to have a cracked skull. After his fall from power the new regime recalled Aliyu Mohammed from retirement, promoted him to Brigadier-General and made him the acting DG of the NSO. Rafindadi's predecessor in office, Umaru Shinkafi was also invited by the new administration to probe the activities of the NSO under Rafindadi and also make recommendations on how to reform it. In August 1986 the new national security coordinator, Brig. Aliyu Mohammed instituted a security services investigation known as "Project Room 103" which was meant to investigate cases of corruption and diversion of funds in the security services particularly the NSO. Project Room 103 discovered through one of Rafindadi's assistants at the NSO, Iro Ladan that Rafindadi had operated at least eight foreign accounts in 5 nations or territories with a culminative balance of £1,777,984.36 as at 1985. Some of the accounts were opened under the name of Manta Sanko Ango, a cover name or legend that Rafindadi used while still active in intelligence work, he had a passport that bore this identity in addition to his diplomatic passport enabling him to use same as identification when opening the accounts.

Rafindadi was ordered by the DMI to sign a letter authorising the transfer the funds into a holding account operated by the Nigerian government until the investigation into his affairs were concluded, the money was wired after much intrigue and was never returned to him. The new government alleged that he had corruptly enriched himself with the security vote of the NSO without providing evidence of same and also that he had maintained foreign accounts while serving in government "contrary to section 7 of the Code of Conduct Bureau and Tribunal Act, Cap 56, Laws of the Federation of Nigeria, 1990". Rafindadi was offered the opportunity to recover the funds if he could explain the source of such wealth as a civil servant but he failed to provide any such evidence. Lawal Rafindadi fought unsuccessfully to get the money back through successive governments until his death on 29 November 2007 from heart related complications.

== Dissolution ==
=== Successor services ===
Following the 1985 military coup that brought Ibrahim Babangida to power, the NSO was dissolved into three separate divisions per the provisions made in Decree 19:

- State Security Service (SSS) – Responsible for domestic intelligence
- National Intelligence Agency (NIA) – Responsible for foreign intelligence and counterintelligence operations
- Defence Intelligence Agency (DIA) – Responsible for military intelligence.

=== NSO alumni ===
With the creation of these services, former staff of the NSO were absorbed into these successor organisations; officers of the internal security directorate were inherited by the SSS while officers of the external intelligence directorate were absorbed by the NIA. The new military government appointed Ismaila Gwarzo a former police officer as the first director general of the SSS, while Lieutenant Colonel A.K Togun, formerly of the DMI, was appointed as his deputy. Albert Horsfall, the former deputy director of the NSO was appointed as the first director general of the NIA, he was assisted by Abdullahi Ibrahim Atta, the former director of external intelligence also at the NSO. Other NSO alumni include Peter Nwaodua, the sixth DG SSS (actually the third but the SSS consider all former NSO DGs as SSS DGs) who was also a former national security adviser to the president of the Gambia. Jonathan Obuseh was also drafted into the SSS from the NSO where he retired as a director, he later went on to establish the private security firm, Sovereign Guards. Bello Lafiaji, a former chairman of the National Drug Law Enforcement Agency (NDLEA), who was also a former policeman and pioneer member of the NSO, was drafted into the new SSS as the first officer-in-charge of the Ajaokuta office.

Babangida sought to clean up the reputation of the intelligence services with Decree 19, but there remains a great deal of continuity between the NSO and the SSS. In fact, the first chief of the DIA was Mohammed Lawal Rafindadi's predecessor as head of the NSO, General Aliyu Gusau.

In September 1990, the Babangida administration reshuffled the leadership of the SSS and NIA with Horsfall taking over as DG SSS and Haliru Akilu, formerly the DG of the DIA assuming the DG NIA position while Ismaila Gwarzo left his position as DG SSS to become the minister of state for police affairs. Zakari Ibrahim, the third director general of the NIA and a one time national counter-terrorism coordinator and deputy national security advisor during Babangida regime, also a former director of finance and administration and former director of intelligence at the NSO.

=== Contemporary comparisons ===
The SSS has been criticised for operating no less like its predecessor the NSO. Many of the NSO's practices have resurfaced in the SSS, which remains directly controlled by the president, and has been accused of human rights violations. In 1986, barely four months after the establishment of the SSS, the director general of the agency Ismaila Gwarzo and his deputy Lieutenant Colonel Tunde Togun were indicted in the killing of the editor of the Newswatch magazine, Dele Giwa by a Letter Bomb delivered to his home.

== See also ==
- Human rights in Nigeria
- MOSOP
- Nigerian Mobile Police

== Bibliography ==
- Intelligence profile : Nigeria. in Sixty-third edition of the N&O column / Spooks newsletter, Date: Sat, 2 August 2003
- Larry Diamond. Nigeria Update, in Foreign Affairs, Winter 1985/86.
- Manno, Dana (13 January 1985). "LOST IN AFRICA And This WomanDana Manno calls the Nigerian Security Organization a Gestapo in black. She has reason. It seized her mother, Marie McBroom, a Jersey City businesswoman, last February and now threatens her with execution for conspiring to deal with petroleum products without lawful authority. Nigeria's oil could scarcely be cruder than its justice". The New York Times.
- Nosakhare Igbinosa: SSS has power of arrest. The Vanguard, 18 February 2005.
