= Abdullahi Sarki Mukhtar =

Nigerian politician and general

Major general Abdullahi Sarki Mukhtar

Nigerian National Security Adviser
- In office 1 June 2006 – 8 March 2010
- President: Olusegun Obasanjo; Umaru Musa Yar'adua
- Preceded by: Aliyu Mohammed Gusau
- Succeeded by: Aliyu Mohammed Gusau

Governor of Kaduna State
- In office July 1988 – August 1990
- President: Ibrahim Babangida
- Preceded by: Abubakar Dangiwa Umar
- Succeeded by: Tanko Ayuba

Governor of Katsina State
- In office September 1987 – July 1988
- President: Ibrahim Babangida
- Succeeded by: Lawrence Onoja

Personal details
- Born: 5 July 1949 (age 76) Kano State, Colonial Nigeria

Military service
- Allegiance: Nigeria
- Branch/service: Nigerian Army
- Rank: Major general

Abdullahi Sarki Mukhtar (born 5 July 1949) was formerly the National security adviser to the president of Nigeria. Rtd Major General Muktar was also a former military governor of Kaduna state and Katsina State, in the case of the latter he was the first administrator or governor.

== Life and career ==
He had a fairly prominent army career culminating with his appointment as the general officer commanding the first division, Nigerian army in Kaduna state, before that, he was the Chief of Staff of a peace keeping force in Liberia.

The retired general was one of the few serving high-ranking officers in the middle of the 1990s who voiced concerns over the detention and trial of the former President Obasanjo and his former deputy Shehu Musa Yar'Adua. He is known as a principled and charismatic officer who earned the respect of President Obasanjo when he refused to budge to the demands of Sani Abacha, on the treatment of coup suspects in 1995.

From 23 January 2002, to 30 May 2003, he administrated the Embassy of Nigeria in Moscow and was also accredited to Minsk.
