= Riku Morgan =

Nigerian Airforce officer

Air Vice Marshal Monday Riku Morgan

Chief of Defence Intelligence Agency
- In office July 2015 – January 2016
- Preceded by: Rear-Adm Gabriel Okoi
- Succeeded by: Maj-Gen J.S. Davies

Military service
- Allegiance: Nigeria
- Branch/service: Nigerian Air Force
- Rank: Air Vice Marshal
- Commands: Defence Intelligence Agency

Monday Riku Morgan is a retired Nigerian Airforce officer who headed the Defence Intelligence Agency of Nigeria from July 2015 to January 2016.

== Career ==
Morgan was the Air Officer Commanding (AOC), Logistics Command, Nigerian Air Force, Ikeja, Lagos before his appointment as CDI. Morgan, a seasoned fighter pilot, also had a stint as the Senior Air Staff Officer, Tactical Air Command, Nigerian Air Force, Makurdi. He was appointed as Chief of Defence Intelligence (CDI) on July 13, 2015, by President Muhammadu Buhari.
