= Ita Ekpeyong =

Nigerian security officer

Director of the State Security Service
- In office 7 September 2010 – 2 July 2015
- President: Goodluck Jonathan; Muhammadu Buhari
- Preceded by: Afakriya Gadzama
- Succeeded by: Lawal Musa Daura

Personal details
- Born: Unknown

Ita Esien Ekpeyong mni (or Ekpenyong) is a Nigerian security officer who served as Director General of the State Security Service from September 2010 to July 2015 under President Goodluck Jonathan.

== Background ==
Ekpeyong was born in Cross River State. He studied at the University of Calabar, obtaining a BA (Hons) in History in 1982, and then a master's in Philosophy. He was the first director of the Institute of Security Studies in Abuja, a training school for intelligence officers. He then was appointed director of the Senior Staff Development Centre of the SSS in Bauchi. Ekpenyong also held position of SSS director in the states of Bauchi, Kwara, Lagos, Anambra and the Federal Capital Territory. Before he was appointed Director General, he was Acting National Director (Operations) of the SSS. His efforts at the 2007 governorship election in Anambra State was said to have influenced Jonathan's choice to appoint him.

== Director General of the SSS ==
Ekpeyong was appointed Director General of the State Security Service on 7 September 2010 by President Goodluck Jonathan. Ekpenyong is perceived as likely to improve the public perception of the SSS, which has been negative in the past. He has said "The frontiers of security management have moved away from the culture of impunity to the friendly frontiers of the rule of law, due process, civility and professionalism ... Democratic changes and their attributes, such as due process, rule of law and respect for human rights, have become very important for us".

After pre-election violence in Benue State in March 2011, the SSS invited prominent people for questioning at SSS headquarters in Abuja. They included Adamu Aleiro, Barnabas Gemade, Iyorchia Ayu, Steve Ugpa, Daniel Saror and PDP Chairman in the state, Dr. Agbo Emmanuel. The session, held in an underground cell, lasted for about five hours. At one point Ekpenyong ordered the call to be plunged in darkness for ten minutes to show what the leaders would face if the violence persisted. After the interrogation an SSS spokesperson said "they were invited because investigations revealed that they were behind the present political violence in the state and that after the interrogation, they showed remorse and were mandated to sign an undertaking to give peace a chance in the state".

Before the April 2011 general elections, Ekpeyong discussed factors that could mitigate against free and fair elections. These included the illegal arms shipments, inflammatory stories in the media, religion, political violence and extremist Islamic sects such as the Boko Haram. Earlier, he had spoken out against "the denial of venues by some state governments to opposition parties". He said that the SSS would provide security to all parties throughout the election period, and would ensure that all parties had a level playing field. On 2 July 2015, Ekpeyong was dismissed by President Muhammadu Buhari and was replaced by Lawal Musa Daura who was a retired State the agency.

== Arrest ==
In August 2018, Ekpeyong was arrested and subsequently released by the Economic Crimes and Financial Commission (EFCC) over alleged complicity in the $2 billion arms deal.
