= Babagana Monguno =

Nigerian general and politician (born 1957)

Major General Babagana Monguno CFR
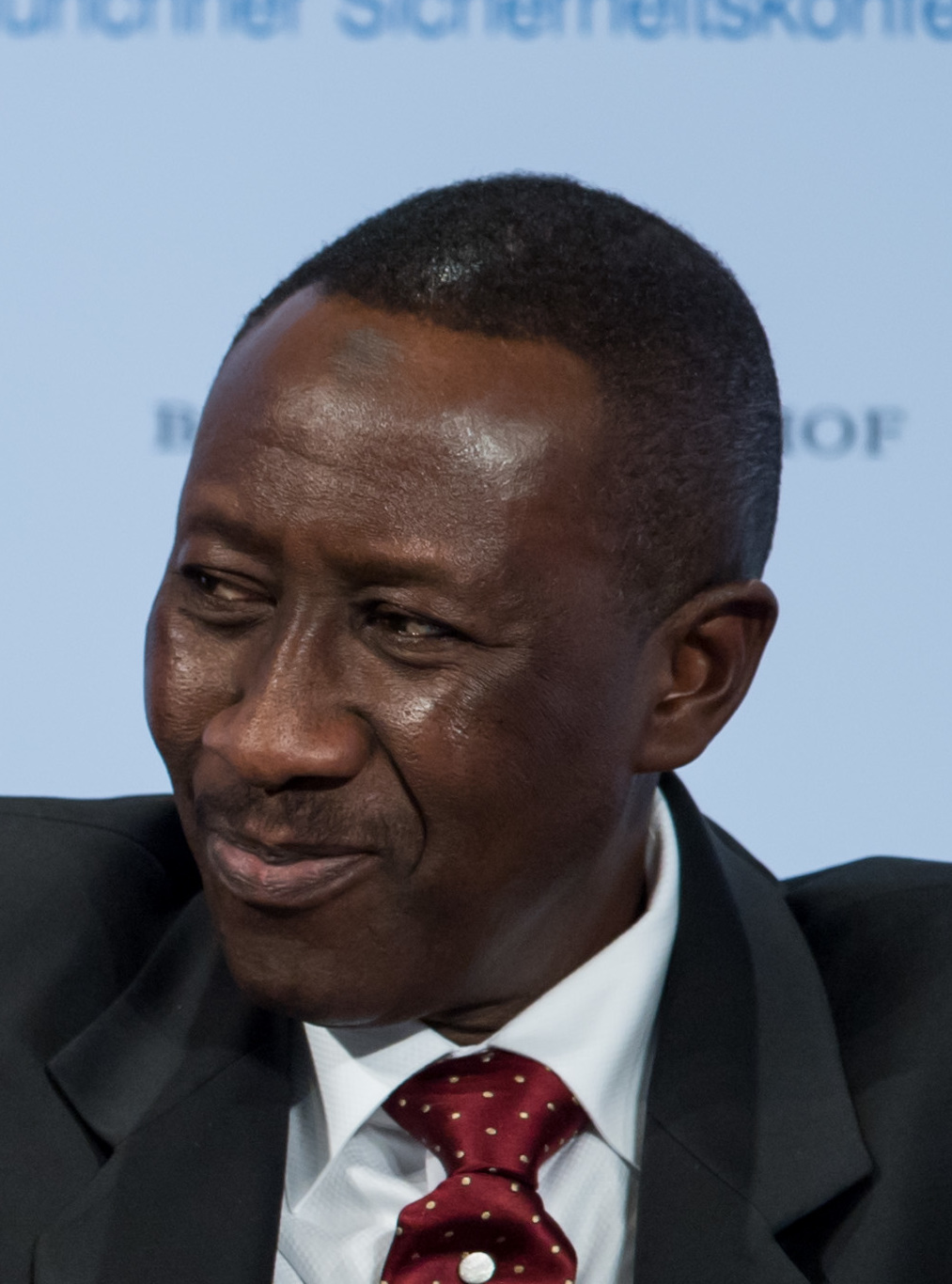
- Monguno during the Munich Security Conference, 2018

Nigerian National Security Adviser
- In office 13 July 2015 – 26 June 2023
- Appointed by: Muhammadu Buhari
- Preceded by: Sambo Dasuki
- Succeeded by: Nuhu Ribadu

Chief of Defence Intelligence
- In office July 2009 – September 2011
- President: Umaru Musa Yar'Adua; Goodluck Jonathan
- Preceded by: Mohammed Said
- Succeeded by: Maj-Gen S.Y. Audu

Commander of the Brigade of Guards
- In office August 2007 – January 2009
- Succeeded by: Brig-Gen. A.S. Mustapha

Personal details
- Born: Mohammed Babagana Monguno; 1957 (age 68–69)
- Education: King's College, Lagos; Nigerian Defence Academy
- Occupation: Politician; military officer

Military service
- Allegiance: Nigeria
- Branch/service: Nigerian Army
- Years of service: 1977–2013
- Rank: Major general

Mohammed Babagana Monguno CFR (born 1957) is a Nigerian retired military general who served as National Security Adviser from 2015 to 2023. He was the Chief of Defence Intelligence from July 2009 to September 2011; and the Commander of the Brigade of Guards from 2007 to 2009.

== Early life and education ==
Babagana Mohammed Monguno is from Borno State.

Monguno was educated at King's College, Lagos. He then proceeded to the Nigerian Defence Academy where he was an officer cadet in the 21st Regular Course with other officers such as Alex Sabundu Badeh and Emeka Onwuamaegbu.

== Military career ==
Monguno previously served as the Chief of Logistics at Defence Headquarters and later as Commander of the Nigerian Army Training and Doctrine Command (TRADOC).

Monguno also served as Commander, Guards Brigade, Deputy Commandant, National Defence College, and Chief of Defence Intelligence. Prior to his retirement from the Nigerian army he was considered for Chief of Army Staff position.

Monguno voluntarily retired from the Nigerian Army in September 2013 after turning 56, the age ceiling for Major General in the Nigerian army.

== National Security Adviser ==
Monguno was appointed National Security Adviser on 13 July 2015 by President Muhammadu Buhari.

== Awards ==
In October 2022, a Nigerian national honour of Commander of the Order of the Federal Republic (CFR) was conferred on him by President Muhammadu Buhari.
