= Mohammed Lawal Rafindadi =

Nigerian diplomat (1934–2007)

Director General of the National Security Organization
- In office January 1984 – August 1985
- Preceded by: Umaru Shinkafi
- Succeeded by: Aliyu Mohammed Gusau

Personal details
- Born: 1934
- Died: 2007 (aged 72–73)

Mohammed Lawal Rafindadi (1934–2007) was a Nigerian diplomat and security chief from Katsina state. Ambassador Rafindadi was a career diplomat in the Nigerian foreign service and also a pioneer intelligence officer in the Research Department (RD) of the Foreign Ministry. He served as Nigeria's Ambassador to West Germany between 1981 and 1983 and later as the third and last Director-General of the National Security Organization (NSO).

== Life ==
Rafindadi was born on February 12, 1936, in his home town of Katsina. He enrolled at Gafai Elementary School in 1944 finishing his primary education in 1948. He then proceeded to Provincial Secondary School, Katsina (1948-1953) and in 1954, he attended Clerical Training College, Zaria. In 1954, he joined the civil service working for the Northern Nigeria regional government. In 1961, he transferred services to the Federal Ministry of External Affairs where he ended his career as Nigeria's top diplomat in West Germany in 1983.

Rafindadi was NSO chief during the administration of Muhammadu Buhari. Between 1984 and 1985, the organization was responsible for holding several Nigerians and a few foreigners in detention without trial. The organization was also involved in the investigation of corruption against Umaru Dikko.

In 1985, the NSO investigated a report about an import scandal involving General Aliyu Gusau. The report indicted Gusau who was asked to retire. However, a military coup in August 1985 toppled Buhari's regime, the coupists led by Ibrahim Babangida then placed Rafindadi in solitary confinement for 40 months.
