= Abdullahi Mohammed =

Nigerian general (1939–2025)

Major general Abdullahi Mohammed Adangba

Chief of Staff to the President
- In office 29 May 1999 – 2 June 2008
- President: Olusegun Obasanjo; Umaru Musa Yar'Adua
- Preceded by: Position established
- Succeeded by: Gbolade Osinowo

National Security Adviser
- In office June 1998 – May 1999
- President: Abdulsalami Abubakar
- Preceded by: Ismaila Gwarzo
- Succeeded by: Aliyu Mohammed Gusau

Director General of National Security Organization
- In office March 1976 – October 1979
- President: Olusegun Obasanjo
- Preceded by: Position established
- Succeeded by: Umaru Shinkafi

Governor of Benue-Plateau State
- In office July 1975 – March 1976
- President: Murtala Mohammed
- Preceded by: Joseph Gomwalk
- Succeeded by: Abdullahi Shelleng (Benue); Dan Suleiman (Plateau)

Personal details
- Born: 1939
- Died: 5 November 2025 (aged 86) Abuja, Nigeria
- Education: RMA Sandhurst

Military service
- Allegiance: Nigeria
- Branch: Nigerian Army
- Service years: 1958–1979
- Rank: Major general

Abdullahi Mohammed (1939 – 5 November 2025) was a Nigerian Army major general who served as chief of staff to presidents Olusegun Obasanjo and Umaru Musa Yar'Adua from 1999 to 2008; National Security Adviser to General Abdusalami Abubakar from 1998 to 1999; Director General of the National Security Organisation from 1976 to 1979; and Governor of Benue-Plateau State, Nigeria, from July 1975 to February 1976 during the military regime of General Murtala Mohammed.

== Murtala and Obasanjo years ==
In July 1975, Mohammed was Director of Military Intelligence, and formed and executed the 1975 Nigerian coup d'état plan with other officers, including Shehu Musa Yar'Adua, Joseph Nanven Garba, Muhammadu Buhari and Ibrahim Taiwo, to depose General Yakubu Gowon, after which they transferred power to General Murtala Muhammed as head of state. Immediately after the coup, he was appointed Governor of Benue Plateau State.

After Olusegun Obasanjo had taken over control, he recalled Mohammed in March 1976, and appointed him to the Supreme Military Council as Director General of the Nigeria Security Organisation with the additional responsibility for police security. Later he was made director of military intelligence.

== Second Republic ==
After General Olusegun Obasanjo handed over to elected civilians at the start of the Nigerian Second Republic in 1979, Mohammed retired from the army. He went into private business, becoming managing director of Atoto Press in Ilorin.

== National Security Adviser ==
In 1998, General Abdusalami Abubakar who took over as head of state after the death of General Sani Abacha, removed Ismaila Gwarzo and appointed Mohammed as National Security Adviser.

== Fourth Republic ==
In 1999, President Olusegun Obasanjo made Mohammed his chief of staff, and President Umaru Yar'Adua re-appointed Mohammed as chief of staff when he assumed office on 29 May 2007. Mohammed resigned on 2 June 2008.

== Death ==
Mohammed died on 5 November 2025, at the age of 86.
