= Ismaila Gwarzo =

Nigerian high ranking security and intelligence official

Alhaji Ismaila Gwarzo

National Security Adviser
- In office August 1993 – June 1998
- President: Sani Abacha
- Preceded by: Aliyu Mohammed Gusau
- Succeeded by: Abdullahi Mohammed

Minister of Police Affairs
- In office August 1990 – January 1993
- President: Ibrahim Babangida

Director of the State Security Service
- In office June 1986 – September 1990
- President: Ibrahim Babangida
- Preceded by: Position established
- Succeeded by: Albert Horsfall

Personal details
- Born: Gwarzo, Kano State, Nigeria

Alhaji Ismaila Gwarzo is a retired Nigerian high ranking security and intelligence official. He was a police officer, and the first Director of the State Security Service; Minister of Police Affairs and was also the National Security Adviser to Head of State Sani Abacha. He has been linked to the theft of about $2.45 billion from the Central Bank of Nigeria.

== Early life ==
Aliyu Ismaila Gwarzo was born in the town of Gwarzo in Kano State, about 72 kilometres from the capital Kano. He entered the Nigeria Police Force where he held a number of positions of increasing responsibility, retiring with a senior rank.

== Head of the state security service ==
In June 1986, the Military Head of State, General Ibrahim Babangida appointed Gwarzo as Director General of the newly formed State Security Service (SSS), responsible for domestic intelligence. His Deputy Director was Lt. Colonel A.K. Togun.

In a case that attracted considerable media attention, Dele Giwa, editor-in-chief of Newswatch magazine, was killed on 19 October 1986 by a parcel bomb. Two days earlier SSS officials had summoned Giwa to their headquarters, where Colonel A. K. Togun accused him of planning a social revolution and of smuggling arms into the country. Gwarzo was suspected of involvement in the assassination, but could not be questioned due to his position.

== National security advisor ==
Gwarzo was National Security Advisor (NSA) for President Ernest Shonekan, who took office in August 1993, and then for General Sani Abacha from November 1993 onward. He concentrated mostly on security matters, and did not become involved in foreign policy decisions. However, Gwarzo did ask for funds for a campaign to cultivate the friendship of East African countries and the OAU to garner support for Nigeria gaining a permanent seat on the United Nations Security Council. Within Nigeria, Gwarzo collected money for use in pro-government propaganda. The amounts spent were leaked to the radio and press, undermining the credibility of the regime. Gwarzo and Major Hamza al-Mustapha, Abacha's Chief Security Officer, were said to be responsible for much of the "torture, killing and wanton looting" during Abacha's rule.

Gwarzo reportedly issued fake security reports that made it possible for hundreds of millions of dollars to be transferred from the government into private accounts owned by Abacha's relatives, while becoming a rich man in the process. A preliminary report published by General Abdulsalami Abubakar's transitional government in November 1998 described the process. Abacha told Gwarzo to prepare funding requests for fake security projects, which Abacha approved as Head of State. The Central Bank of Nigeria usually sent the funds to Gwarzo in cash or travellers' checks, and Gwarzo took the money to Abacha's house. Sani Abacha's son Mohammed then arranged to launder the money to offshore accounts. An estimated $1.4 billion in cash was delivered in this way. For his personal benefit, Gwarzo persuaded Abacha to let him flood the market with US dollars to maintain a stable exchange rate. Gwarzo bought $100 million from the Central Bank of Nigeria at the official rate of N22 per dollar, and sold at the market rate of N84 per dollar, keeping the profit.

== House arrest ==
After Abacha's death in June 1998, his successor General Abdulsalami Abubakar had Gwarzo immediately placed under house arrest. He was freed after being detained for three months. Gwarzo was eventually accused of stealing an estimated $2.45 billion from the Nigerian Central Bank. Accounts of the amounts and eventual disposition of the funds that were recovered are confused. In August 1998 the government said it had found about $500 million that Gwarzo had hidden in bank accounts and safe houses. By November 1998 Abubakar announced that the government had recovered $1 billion from the Abacha family and another $250 million from Gwarzo. According to Reuters, that month a presidential spokesman said the government had recovered US$750 million from Gwarzo of which $625.2 million were in U.S. dollars and £75.3 million were in pounds sterling, worth about US$125.4 million. A November newspaper story said 37 properties had also been seized from Gwarzo, five vehicles and 16 trailers of fertilizers. Gwarzo reportedly "insisted that he was merely 'an errand boy' to the late Abacha".

Nigeria returned to democracy in May 1999 with the Nigerian Fourth Republic. On 30 September 1999 Nigeria asked the Swiss Federal Office for the Prevention of Money Laundering to freeze all the assets of the Abacha family, Gwarzo and others associated with the regime. In January 2000 it was reported that $654 million had been found in about 140 Swiss bank accounts in the names of Abacha, his family and associates. More money had been found in Luxembourg and Belgium, and it was suspected that money had been hidden in other countries. President Olusegun Obasanjo issued an informal injunction restricting Gwarzo to his home town in Kano State to prevent alleged plots. Gwarzo was under house arrest for 18 months with no charges brought against him. In September 2000 Gwarzo appeared before a Swiss judge and a team of Swiss detectives in Abuja. He offered to pay another $500 million to the Federal government.

== Later career ==
A report in Newswatch in February 2004 noted that Gwarzo and others known to have stolen large amounts from the government were still free. Although Obasanjo had established the Independent Corrupt Practices Commission (ICPC) soon after being elected, the law was not retroactive. In March 2011 the Arewa Consultative Forum called a meeting of retired security chiefs and generals from the North. Gwarzo was among those invited. Some newspapers said the purpose was to mobilise support former military head of state Muhammadu Buhari, who was running for election as President on the Congress for Progressive Change platform. The ACF said this was untrue. The ACF had only discussed a planned meeting of security experts to prepare recommendations for President Goodluck Jonathan.
