= Dikko affair =

Diplomatic affair between the UK and Nigeria

The Dikko affair was a Nigerian attempt to kidnap Umaru Dikko, a former Nigerian government minister living in the United Kingdom, in 1984, and secretly transport him back to Nigeria in a diplomatic bag. The kidnapping was successful, but was witnessed by Dikko's secretary, who notified the authorities. The scheme unraveled at the airport due to faulty documentation—which was supposed to block inspection of the "bag" (actually a large crate)—and Dikko was rescued. The political fallout seriously damaged relations between Nigeria and the United Kingdom for years.

== Background ==
Dikko was an influential transport minister in the civilian administration of President Shehu Shagari, his brother-in-law. In 1983, the Nigerian government was overthrown in a military coup led by Major-General Muhammadu Buhari, and a new military government led by Buhari was established. On his second day in power, Buhari issued a list of former government officials accused of a variety of crimes. Dikko, who topped the list, was accused of embezzling several billion US dollars (sources claim that the amount was around 6 billion US dollars) in oil profits from the national treasury. Dikko fled to Britain, settled in London, and became a vocal critic of the regime in exile.

== The kidnapping ==
Nigerian security service agents led by ex-Nigerian Army Major Mohammed Yusufu, traveled to London. Alexander Barak, an alleged former Israeli Mossad agent, was hired to lead the team, which included his childhood friend, the Israeli mobster Felix Abutbul. The team rented an apartment on Cromwell Road and posed as refugees from the new regime.

On 30 June 1984, Dikko was spotted and followed on foot to his house in Porchester Terrace. The house was kept under constant surveillance, while the Nigerians, using their London high commission as a base, prepared a kidnapping operation. Levi-Arie Shapiro, an Israeli doctor who was a consultant anesthetist and director of the intensive care unit at HaSharon Hospital, was recruited. He was to fly to London and participate in the operation. Shapiro's job would be to drug Dikko, and insert an endotracheal tube to keep him from choking on his own vomit while being transported in a crate.

Late in the evening of 3 July 1984, a Nigeria Airways Boeing 707 arrived at Stansted Airport from Lagos. The aircraft had arrived empty, and the pilot notified the authorities that the plane had arrived to pick up diplomatic baggage from the Nigerian high commission. On board were several Nigerian security guards, who openly identified themselves as such and stated that they were there to protect the baggage. Their presence was reported to Scotland Yard's Special Branch. The following day, Dikko was kidnapped in front of his home while he went out for a walk and was taken away in a van driven by Yusufu. He was then drugged into unconsciousness by Shapiro. However, the abduction was witnessed by Dikko's secretary, Elizabeth Hayes, who quickly notified the authorities.

Dikko and Shapiro were placed in one crate, while Barak and fellow Israeli Felix Abutbol occupied another one. However, proper documentation that would have ensured that the cargo could not be inspected was not provided. The crates were also not labeled as diplomatic bags, as required by Article 27(4) of the 1961 Vienna Convention on Diplomatic Relations. As a result, customs officials who had received an all-ports warning alerting them to the kidnapping while the crates were being processed at the airport were able to open the crates without violating the convention and foil the kidnapping. Dikko was taken to a hospital; he was uninjured.

Seventeen men were arrested; four were convicted and sentenced to prison terms of 10 to 14 years: Shapiro, Barak, Abithol, and Yusufu. All four were released after serving between six and eight and a half years, and were quietly deported. In retaliation, two British engineers in Nigeria were arrested and given fourteen-year prison sentences for allegedly stealing a private jet. The two British engineers had their charges overturned and were released after serving 25 months.

== Repercussions ==
The Nigerian government never admitted any connection to the incident. Nonetheless, the British government immediately expelled two members of the Nigerian High Commission in London, including the High Commissioner. Diplomatic relations with Nigeria were broken off for two years. The CEO of Nigeria Airways was at one point almost arrested by British police. In the aftermath of the affair, Nigeria filed a formal extradition request for Dikko, but it was refused. The Nigerian government's war against the previous government's corruption was also weakened, as the British government also rejected Nigerian requests to extradite other politicians wanted in Nigeria on corruption charges and living in exile in Britain.

The Israeli government denied allegations that it was involved in the kidnapping.

Dikko was eventually asked to return to Nigeria. He accepted the invitation and set up a political party, the Solidarity Group of Nigeria (SGN).
