= Umaru Shinkafi =

Nigerian intelligence chief, and Federal Commissioner of Internal Affairs

Director General of the National Security Organization
- In office October 1979 – November 1983
- Preceded by: Abdullahi Mohammed
- Succeeded by: Mohammed Lawal Rafindadi

Federal Commissioner of Internal Affairs
- In office 1975–1979
- Preceded by: Adamu Suleiman
- Succeeded by: Maitama Bello Yusuf

Personal details
- Born: 19 January 1937 Kaura Namoda, Northern Region, British Nigeria (now Sokoto State, Nigeria)
- Died: 6 July 2016 (aged 79) London, England
- Education: University of Lagos; Nigerian Law School

Umaru Shinkafi (19 January 1937 – 6 July 2016) was a Nigerian intelligence chief, and Federal Commissioner of Internal Affairs. He was a presidential aspirant during the Third Nigerian Republic.

== Early career ==
Umaru Shinkafi's father Ali Bisije was from Gashua, Yobe State while his mother was a Princess from Kaura Namoda, Zamfara State. Umaru Shinkafi was born in 1937 at Shinkafi, Zamfara State. He joined the Nigerian police force in 1959, after passing through the police college in Kaduna. In 1973 he graduated from the University of Lagos and a year later, he graduated from the Nigerian Law School. He was a Federal Commissioner of Internal Affairs in 1975 and later became the head of the National Security Organization in 1979.

== Third Republic ==
During the Nigerian third republic, Shinkafi was one of the promoters of the Nigerian National Congress (NNC) a political association formed in 1989 after the disbanding of political groups by the Babangida administration, the NNC later joined the National Republican Convention. Early on, Shinkafi emerged as a leading presidential candidate during the period Babangida banned old breed politicians, he created a choice 92 campaign group for his presidential ambition which intended to have a canvasser in every ward of the federation. But after the unbanning of old breed politicians, he had to face tough competition in Adamu Ciroma, who had earlier supported his ambition. However, the primaries were later annulled and the presidential politicians banned, a new primary to be conducted under a new Option A4 electoral system was approved by Babangida. During the next primaries, Shinkafi supported the eventual NRC presidential candidate, Bashir Tofa and the party chairmanship aspirant, Hamed Kusamotu.

He died in London from an undisclosed illness on 6 July 2016.
