= Dangiwa Umar =

Nigerian soldier and politician

Colonel Abubakar Dangiwa Umar

Governor of Kaduna State
- In office August 1985 – June 1988
- Preceded by: Usman Mu'azu
- Succeeded by: Abdullahi Sarki Mukhtar

Personal details
- Born: 21 September 1949 (age 77) Birnin Kebbi, Kebbi State, Nigeria
- Parent: Umaru Nassarawa (father)

Military service
- Allegiance: Nigeria
- Branch/service: Nigerian Army
- Rank: Colonel

Abubakar Dangiwa Umar (born 21 September 1949) was governor of Kaduna state in Nigeria from August 1985 to June 1988 during the military regime of General Ibrahim Babangida. After retiring from the army in 1993, he became a social critic and the founder of Movement for Unity and Progress, a political party.

== Birth and education ==
Umar was born on 21 September 1949 in Birnin Kebbi, Kebbi State. His father, Umaru Nassarawa, was a school teacher and administrator with the traditional title of Waziri of Gwandu who became a member of the House of Representatives in Lagos (1954 - 1964) and Commissioner for Works in the North-Western State (1968 - 1975).

Umar was educated at Government College, Sokoto (1964 - 1968), Nigerian Defence Academy, Kaduna, (1967 - 1972), Nigeria Army Armored School, Ibadan, (1972), US Army Administration School, Fort Benjamin Harrison, Indiana, USA (1976), Royal Armour School, Kentucky, USA (1977 - 1978), Command and Staff College, Jaji (1978 - 1979 and 1982 - 1983), Bayero University, Kano (1979 - 1981), Harvard University, USA (1988 - 1989).

== Military career ==
Umar joined the Nigerian Army in 1967 and was commissioned as Second Lieutenant in March 1972. He held various positions, including ADC to Major General Hassan Usman Katsina, Deputy Chief of Staff, Supreme Headquarters. Umar was appointed General Staff Officer in the Department of Armour, Army Headquarters. At the time of the coup of 27 August 1985 in which General Ibrahim Babangida assumed power he was a Major and Chairman of the Federal Housing Authority (1984 - 1985). He supported the coup, and after it succeeded he was appointed Governor of Kaduna State. Later he was promoted to Lt. Colonel.

Umar was Military Governor of Kaduna State from September 1985 to June 1988, during a period when funding was scarce. He had to deal with a serious religious crisis within the state in 1987, becoming unpopular with all sides of the dispute. He said "If you win a religious war, you cannot win a religious peace [...] Since the killing started how many Christians have been converted to Islam? How many Muslims have been converted to Christianity? It is an exercise in futility".

In 1993, he was Colonel and Commander of the Armoured Corps Center and School. He was opposed to the annulment of the 12 June 1993 presidential election, and started looking for support within the army for installing the elected president M.K.O. Abiola. In October, he was detained on suspicion of conspiracy, but was not charged. After being released he resigned his commission.

== Later career ==
After retirement, Umar became chairman and chief executive, Work and Worship (Gas Company) Nigeria Limited, Kaduna. Umar was a vocal critic of the General Sani Abacha regime, and joined the G-18 group of politicians that publicly opposed Abacha's plan to become president. During the Nigerian Fourth Republic he was outspoken on many issues. In June 2000, he said the concept of a monolithic Northern region was obsolete and unnecessary. He warned defeated candidates in the 2003 elections to exercise restraint and follow the law in appealing the results. In March 2004, he wrote a letter to President Olusegun Obasanjo in which he accused him of being an accomplice in the annulment of the 12 June 1993 Presidential election.

In June 2004, he said that the government's unpopular economic policies were creating social unrest. In May 2005, he spoke out against the forced retirement of a deputy governor of the Central Bank of Nigeria and accused the government of insincerity in its fight against corruption. He strongly opposed proposals to let Obasanjo run for a third term. In January 2008, he supported the controversial removal of Nuhu Ribadu as Chairman of the Economic and Financial Crimes Commission on the basis that Ribadu was insufficiently experienced, and had carried out the directives of President Olusegun Obasanjo without question. In August 2009, he accused President Umaru Yar'Adua of nepotism in his appointments. In December 2009, he called on the ailing President to resign.

In a June 2014 interview, he stressed the importance of dialogue to resolve the Boko Haram insurgency, saying:

"I don't think there is connivance between military people and Boko Haram ... I think there must be unity of purpose; the nation must be united in this very dangerous war against Boko Haram. The only way Boko Haram can succeed is if the nation gets divided and it is up to the federal government to unite the public against Boko Haram."
