= Umaru Dikko =

Nigerian politician (1936–2014)

Minister for Transportation
- In office 1979–1983
- President: Shehu Shagari

Personal details
- Born: 31 December 1936 Wamba, Kaduna, British Nigeria
- Died: 1 July 2014 (aged 77) London, United Kingdom
- Party: Solidarity Group of Nigeria (SGN); United Democratic Party
- Education: University of London

Umaru Abdulrahman Dikko (31 December 1936 – 1 July 2014) was a Nigerian politician. He was an advisor to President Shehu Shagari and served as minister for transportation from 1979 to 1983.

== Early life ==
Dikko was born in Wamba, a small village near Zaria in Kaduna state of northern Nigeria. He spent his early school years in Zaria before receiving his Bachelor of Science from University of London. Before entering Nigeria's politics he worked for BBC's Hausa service and gradually became one of the prominent voices in the north.

== Political career ==
He started playing a role in the nation's governance in 1967, when he was appointed as a commissioner in the then North Central State of Nigeria (now Kaduna State). He was also secretary of a committee set up by General Hassan Katsina to unite the Northerners after a coup in 1966. In 1979, he was made Shagari's campaign manager for the successful presidential campaign of the National Party of Nigeria. During the nation's Second Republic, he played prominent roles as transport minister and head of the presidential task force on rice.

A military coup on 31 December 1983 overthrew the government of Shagari. Dikko fled into exile in London along with a few other ministers and party officials of the National Party of Nigeria. The new military regime accused him of large-scale corruption while in office, in particular of embezzling millions of dollars from the nation's oil revenues.

On 5 July 1984, he played the central role in the Dikko affair as he was found drugged in a crate at Stansted Airport that was being claimed as diplomatic baggage, an apparent victim of a government–sanctioned kidnapping. Police were permitted to search the crate as the Nigerians had neglected to mark it as diplomatic baggage or complete the necessary paperwork. The crate's destination was Lagos.

He was the leader of Solidarity Group of Nigeria (SGN) that merged with the United Nigeria Congress Party during the Sani Abacha regime. In the Fourth Republic he formed the United Democratic Party (UDP), he was appointed to head the National Disciplinary Committee of the PDP in 2013.

He died in London in 2014, aged 77.

== Notes ==
- JO THOMAS, "BRITISH SEEK FOUR MORE IN KIDNAPPING OF NIGERIAN", The New York Times, 12 July 1984
