= National Intelligence Agency (Nigeria) =

Nigerian government division

Agency overview
- Formed: 5 June 1986; 40 years ago
- Jurisdiction: Government of Nigeria
- Headquarters: Abuja, Nigeria
- Agency executive: Mohammed Mohammed, Director-General
- Website: nationalintelligenceagency.gov.ng

The National Intelligence Agency (NIA) is a Nigerian government division tasked with overseeing foreign intelligence and counterintelligence operations.

== History ==
Fulfilling one of the promises made in his first national address as president, in June 1986, Ibrahim Babangida issued Decree Number 19, dissolving the National Security Organization (NSO) and restructuring Nigeria's security services into three separate entities under the Office of the Co-ordinator of National Security.

- State Security Service (SSS) – Responsible for domestic intelligence
- National Intelligence Agency (NIA) – Responsible for foreign intelligence and counterintelligence operations
- Defence Intelligence Agency (DIA) – Responsible for military intelligence.

== Directors General of the NIA ==
Directors General of the NIA	Term of Service
Chief Albert K. Horsfall	1986–1990
Brigadier General Haliru Akilu (Rtd.)	1990–1993
Ambassador Zakari Y. Ibrahim	1993–1998
Ambassador Godfrey B. Preware	1998–1999
Ambassador Uche O. Okeke	1999–2007
Ambassador Emmanuel E. Imohe	2007 – September 2009
Ambassador Olaniyi Oladeji	September 2009 – October 2013
Ambassador Ayo Oke	7 November 2013 – October 2017
Ahmed Rufai Abubakar	10 January 2018 – 24 August 2024
Ambassador Mohammed Mohammed	26 August 2024 – Present
