= Defence Intelligence Agency (Nigeria) =

Primary military intelligence agency of Nigeria

Agency overview
- Formed: 5 June 1986; 40 years ago
- Preceding agency: National Security Organization
- Jurisdiction: Nigeria
- Employees: Classified
- Annual budget: Classified
- Agency executive: Bola Tinubu, President of Nigeria; Lieutenant General Emmanuel Undiandeye, Chief of Defence Intelligence
- Key document: National Security Agencies Act of 1986 (Decree 19)

The Defence Intelligence Agency (DIA), is the primary military intelligence agency of Nigeria. The DIA was established in 1986 to provide an efficient system of obtaining military intelligence for the Nigerian Armed Forces and Ministry of Defence. The DIA promotes Nigeria's Defence Policy, enhances military cooperation with other countries, protects the lives of Nigerian citizens, and maintains the territorial integrity of Nigeria. The DIA is headed by the Chief of Defence Intelligence (CDI) who is appointed by the President of Nigeria.

== Origins ==
In June 1986, then president, General Ibrahim Babangida issued Decree Number 19, dissolving the National Security Organization (NSO) and restructuring Nigeria's security services into three separate entities under the Office of the Co-ordinator of National Security.

- The State Security Service (SSS) was made responsible for domestic intelligence, with Director General Ismaila Gwarzo and Deputy Director Lt. Col. A.K. Togun.
- The National Intelligence Agency (NIA) handled external intelligence and counterintelligence.
- The DIA was tasked with military-related intelligence outside and inside Nigeria

== Defence Intelligence College ==
The Defence Intelligence College (DIC) was established by Decree 19 of 1986 as a training arm of the Defence Intelligence Agency (DIA). Since then, it has grown to become a Regional Centre of Excellence; especially within the Economic Community of West African States (ECOWAS).
