= State Security Service (Nigeria) =

Nigeria government agency

Department of State Services

Agency overview
- Formed: 5 June 1986; 40 years ago
- Preceding agency: National Security Organization
- Jurisdiction: Nigeria
- Headquarters: Abuja, FCT; 09°04′27″N 7°30′35″E
- Employees: Classified
- Annual budget: Classified
- Agency executive: Adeola Ajayi, Director-General
- Key documents: National Security Agencies Act of 1986 (Decree 19); Presidential Proclamation; SSS Instrument I of 1999
- Website: dss.gov.ng

The State Security Service (SSS), self-styled as the Department of State Services (DSS), is a security agency in Nigeria and one of three successor organisations to the National Security Organization (NSO). The agency is under the Presidency of Nigeria, and it reports its activities to the President and office of the NSA, headquartered in Abuja.

== Mandate ==
The mission of the SSS is to protect and defend the Federal Republic of Nigeria against domestic threats, to uphold and enforce the criminal laws of Nigeria, and to provide leadership and criminal justice services to both federal and state law-enforcement organs. The SSS is also charged with the protection of the President, Vice President, Senate President, Speaker of the House of Representatives, State Governors and Deputy Governors, their immediate families, other high ranking government officials, former presidents and their spouses, certain notable candidates for the offices of President, Vice President and Governors, and visiting foreign heads of state and government. The SSS has constantly adapted to various roles necessitated by evolving security threats in Nigeria including counter-terrorism and counter-insurgents.

Its main responsibilities are within the country and include counter-intelligence, medical intelligence, economic intelligence, internal security, counter-terrorism, and surveillance as well as investigating some other types of serious crimes against the state. It is also charged with the protection of senior government officials, particularly the President, Vice President, state governors and visiting heads of states and governments with their respective families.

== History ==
Fulfilling one of the promises made in his first national address as president, Ibrahim Babangida in June 1986 issued Decree Number 19, dissolving the National Security Organization (NSO) and re-structuring Nigeria's security services into three separate entities under the Office of the Co-ordinator of National Security. The State Security Service (SSS) was made responsible for domestic intelligence, with Director General Ismaila Gwarzo and Deputy Director Lt. Col. A.K. Togun. The National Intelligence Agency (NIA) handled external intelligence and counterintelligence. The Defence Intelligence Agency (DIA) was responsible for military-related intelligence outside and inside Nigeria. The first headquarters of the agency was located at 15, Awolowo road, Ikoyi in Lagos; this site currently houses the Economic and Financial Crimes Commission (EFCC). The SSS headquarters was finally moved to Abuja during the regime of General Sani Abacha, the headquarters complex is informally known as the "Yellow House", it is located on the northern edge of the three-arms zone on Aso drive in Maitama, Abuja.

According to the 1998 Presidential Proclamation, the SSS operates as a department within the Ministry of Defence and its under the control of the National Security Adviser.

On June 26, 2026, The Guardian Nigeria reported on the handling of terrorism-related cases by the Department of State Services (DSS), noting longstanding concerns about delays in the investigation and prosecution of violent crimes and terrorism offences. The article stated that, under Oluwatosin Adeola Ajayi, the agency placed greater emphasis on the investigation and prosecution of terrorism following their arrest. Since Ajayi assumed office in 2024, the DSS started reporting operations involving the disruption of terrorist cells, kidnapping networks and arms-trafficking activities, with an increased emphasis on intelligence-led operations.

On May 16, 2026, United States and Nigerian forces conducted an operation that resulted in the death of Abu-Bilal al-Minuki, described as the second-in-command of ISIS. United States President Donald Trump described the operation as a "meticulously planned and very complex mission", while General Dagvin Anderson, Commander of the United States Africa Command, stated that Nigerian authorities had contributed to identifying the target and providing useful intelligence in the operation.

== Director-Generals of the SSS ==
Name	Terms of Service
Alhaji Ismaila Gwarzo	June 1986 – September 1990
Chief Albert Horsfall	September 1990 – October 1992
Chief Peter Nwaoduah	October 1992 – June 1998
Colonel Kayode Are	May 1999 – August 2007
Afakriya Gadzama	August 2007 – September 2010
Ita Ekpeyong	September 2010 – July 2015
Lawal Musa Daura	July 2015 – August 2018
Matthew Seiyefa	7 August 2018 – 14 September 2018
Yusuf Magaji Bichi	14 September 2018 – 26 August 2024
Adeola Ajayi	26 August 2024 – Present

== Operations ==
=== Successes ===
The SSS has been reasonably successful in performing its primary internal security responsibility. The agency in its early day was credited with the arrest of the Egyptian bomber Omar Mohammed Ali Rezaq in 1993 while he was trying to enter Nigeria through the Nigeria–Benin border. Rezaq was wanted by the United States for leading the bombing of an EgyptAir plane for the Abu Nidal group in 1985 he was subsequently rendered to the United States after an official request was received from the State Department.

In October 2010, the SSS intercepted a large cache of arms and ammunition originating from Iran at the Apapa port in Lagos; this in spite of a UN arms embargo on Iran. The arms which included artillery rockets, shells and mortars were concealed in thirteen containers falsely declared as "building materials", it was alleged that Nigeria was being used as a transhipment destination while Gambia was the final destination for the arms.

The agency has also been reported to have infiltrated a number of religious extremist groups in the country including the Boko Haram sect. In September 2001, six Pakistani proselyters invited by the Lagos-based Tabliq, a Muslim NGO were arrested in Benue State on suspicion of immigration violations and they were subsequently deported on 18 November.

The SSS has also recorded some successes in combating kidnapping in Nigeria with the arrest of some kidnappers and the rescue of their victims. In October 2011, the agency rescued the Parish Priest of St Bernard's Catholic Church Eguaholo in Orhionmwon local government area of Edo state, Rev. Fr Sylvester Chukwura, from his kidnapper's hideout. The kidnappers were baited with the ransom sum and were subsequently ambushed by SSS operatives. In the same time frame, the SSS also arrested another kidnapper in Edo state known as Binebi Sibete, who was described as a notorious kidnapper and killer. Binebi was wanted amongst other things for killing an SSS operative in 2010 and also burning down the state government patrol boat at Gelegele.

=== Criticisms ===
The SSS has been criticised for allowing Umar Farouk Abdul Mutallab, the "underpants bomber", to board Northwest airlines flight from Lagos despite his father having previously warned security officials of his sons radical views on America. In its defence, the SSS said it was not informed by Mr. Mutallab's father of his sons alleged radical beliefs, the agency said that Mutallab's father had actually spoken with officials at the United States Embassy in Abuja and also sought the help of a past Nigerian National Security Adviser. The SSS held that the American authorities did not share the information that Mr. Mutallab senior had given them and the former National Security Adviser had also not contacted the agency hence their inability to act on information they did not possess.

The agency was also criticized heavily in the wake of 26 August 2011 United Nations House bombing in Abuja. The Boko Haram sect which has ties to Al-Qaeda Organization in the Islamic Maghreb (AQIM) claimed responsibility for the car bomb attack that left 24 people dead; the sect had been fighting Boko Haram insurgency that started as a result of their leader being killed by policemen after he had been arrested. The Nigerian public grew even more critical of the agency after newspapers ran stories in which they claimed that the agency had received intelligence about the bombing beforehand from the Americans. This news item later turned out to be false when it was revealed that it was the SSS who had actually received credible intelligence from sources within Boko Haram about an impending attack in Abuja. The intelligence pointed out key government buildings and ministries as targets, the agency subsequently raised the alert level in Abuja and also advised diplomatic missions and international organizations in the city to take adequate security precautions for their staff and premises. The final UN report on the incident indicted the UN resident Security adviser in Abuja and his deputy, they were accused of negligence considering the fact that they had been given "adequate intelligence on a possible suicide attack", yet they failed to implement suitable safeguards. Both men were subsequently relieved of their positions.

In early November 2011, the Nigerian press ran stories alleging that the United States government had issued a travel advisory on Nigeria. The travel advisory according to the papers included the threat of bomb attacks at major hotels in Abuja frequented by expatriates. The story immediately generated panic among the populace and accusations of incompetence made against the security agencies, the SSS inclusive. The story also alleged that the American ambassador had given a statement explaining that the US had given the warning directly because the Nigerian security agencies had failed to act on previous intelligence shared with them. In the end, the situation was only brought under control when the National Security Adviser, Gen. Owoye Andrew Azazi demanded evidence that the Americans had indeed given such a warning or that the American Ambassador had actually said what had been attributed to him in the press. The story turned out to be false, the threat to hotels was actually an intelligence analysis of possible threats made by the SSS some months earlier which was circulated in government circles. The SSS had failed to manage information in a timely and proper fashion which had led to the public losing confidence in the organisation.

=== Casualties ===
The agency has lost a number of operatives in the line of duty, while fatalities are not generally publicised some cases do get a mention in the media. During Nigeria's 50th anniversary celebrations in Abuja on 1 October 2010, a car bomb killed an Assistant Director of the agency and Mr Tahir Zakari Biu an Economic and Financial Crimes Commission (EFCC) operative while they were trying to remove abandoned vehicles from a roadside a few kilometres from the venue of the celebrations. The Movement for the Emancipation of the Niger Delta (MEND) claimed responsibility for the attack. The SSS was able to trace the registration of the car used in the attack and subsequently arrested suspects in Lagos, the mastermind of the operation Mr. Henry Okah was arrested by the South African authorities and put on trial in South Africa on terrorism charges. On 13 April 2007 a Security Protection Officer (SPO) working in the close protection detail of Mr. Onyema Ugochukwu, the People's Democratic Party (PDP) 2007 governorship candidate for Abia state was shot in an assassination attempt on his principal. The bodyguard was shot in the head and in his hand. In 2013, a botched security operation in Nasarawa state in the middle belt region of the country to arrest the leader of the Ombatse cult group who many claim possesses super natural powers used in the maiming of other ethnic groups especially the Fulanis, left scores of security personnel dead including not less than six men of the SSS allegedly killed using occultic powers.

In February 2013, the SSS broke up a terrorist cell led by Iranian handlers that was gathering intelligence for future attacks on American and Israeli targets in the country.

== Weapons and equipment ==
As of 2010, the standard issue assault rifles used by SSS Combat Operatives/Security Protection Officers (S.P.O) are the IMI Tavor Tar-21 assault rifle produced by Israeli Military Industries and the FN P90 personal protection weapon, FN F2000 assault rifle, both manufactured by FN Herstal; these rifles replace the Uzi as the primary assault weapon of the SSS. Operatives also use various side arms and pistols from a number of manufacturers including Beretta, Glock, and Browning.

The agency has also deployed van mounted backscatter X-ray screeners from Basix Technologies for detecting Improvised Explosive Devices (IED) due to an upsurge in bombing incidents arising from a Boko Haram insurgency in the north east of Nigeria. In this counter terrorism role, the agency also uses mobile IED jammers for VIP protection in public spaces like stadiums and in a mobile configuration for use in convoys.

Due to the disproportionately large GSM mobile phone subscriber base in Nigeria and the use of cellphones as the principal means of communication by kidnappers and terrorists, the agency has had to develop telephone call intercept capability. IMSI number catchers and signal direction finders have been deployed for intercepting and tracking GSM and satellite phone communications.

The agency maintains a fleet of armoured limousines and SUVs that are used to ferry the President, Vice president and visiting dignitaries. Other vehicles mainly SUVs produced by Ford Motor Company, Toyota and Lexus are also used by the agency.

== See also ==
- National Intelligence Agency (NIA) – Responsible for Foreign intelligence and counterintelligence operations
- Defence Intelligence Agency (DIA) – Responsible for military intelligence.
