= Kwasarawa, Daura =

Kwasarawa is an ancient place where some Fulani Rulers migrated to from Daura after the British and French had divided the three Daura polities, the British installed Zango's king, Malam Musa, as the new emir of Daura. Kwasarawa once part of Daura, It became part of the newly created Sandamu Local Government in Daura Emirate, Katsina State, Nigeria.

== History ==
In 1805, during the Fulani War, Daura was taken over by Fulani warrior Malam Ishaku, who set up an Islamic emirate. The Hausa set up rival states nearby, and the ruler of one, Malam Musa, was made the new emir of Daura by the British in 1904, While Fulani emirs reigned and established an Islamic emirate at Daura under the Sokoto Caliphate, in 1903–04, after the British and French had divided the three Daura polities, the British installed Zango's king, Malam Musa, as the new traditional emir of Daura emirate council. Part of former North-Central state after 1967, the traditional emirate was incorporated into Kaduna state in 1976. It became part of the newly created Katsina state in 1987. Faruk Umar Faruk became the 60th Emir of Daura on 28 Feb 2007 following the death of Sarkin Muhammadu Bashar dan Umaru.

== Emirate ==
The Daura Royal Palace ‘Kangiwa’ is a huge complex located in the centre of the ancient city. It is a symbol of culture, history and traditions of ‘Daurawa’. The Daura Emirate is referred to as one of the "seven true Hausa states" (Hausa Bakwai) In 1805, during the Fulani War, Daura was taken over by Fulani warrior Malam Ishaku, who set up an emirate. The Hausa set up rival states nearby, and the ruler of one, Malam Musa, was made the new emir of Daura by the British in 1904. , the Emir of Daura still rules as a ceremonial hereditary monarch, and maintains a palace. Umar Faruk Umar became the 60th Emir of Daura on 28 February 2007 following the death of Sarki Muhammadu Bashar Dan Umaru.

Alhaji Habu Wakili is the Sarkin Fulanin Kwasarawa.

== Demography ==
The Hausa people (sometimes grouped with the Fulani as Hausa-Fulani) are the largest ethnic group.
