= Hausa–Fulani =

West African ethnic group

Hausa-Fulani
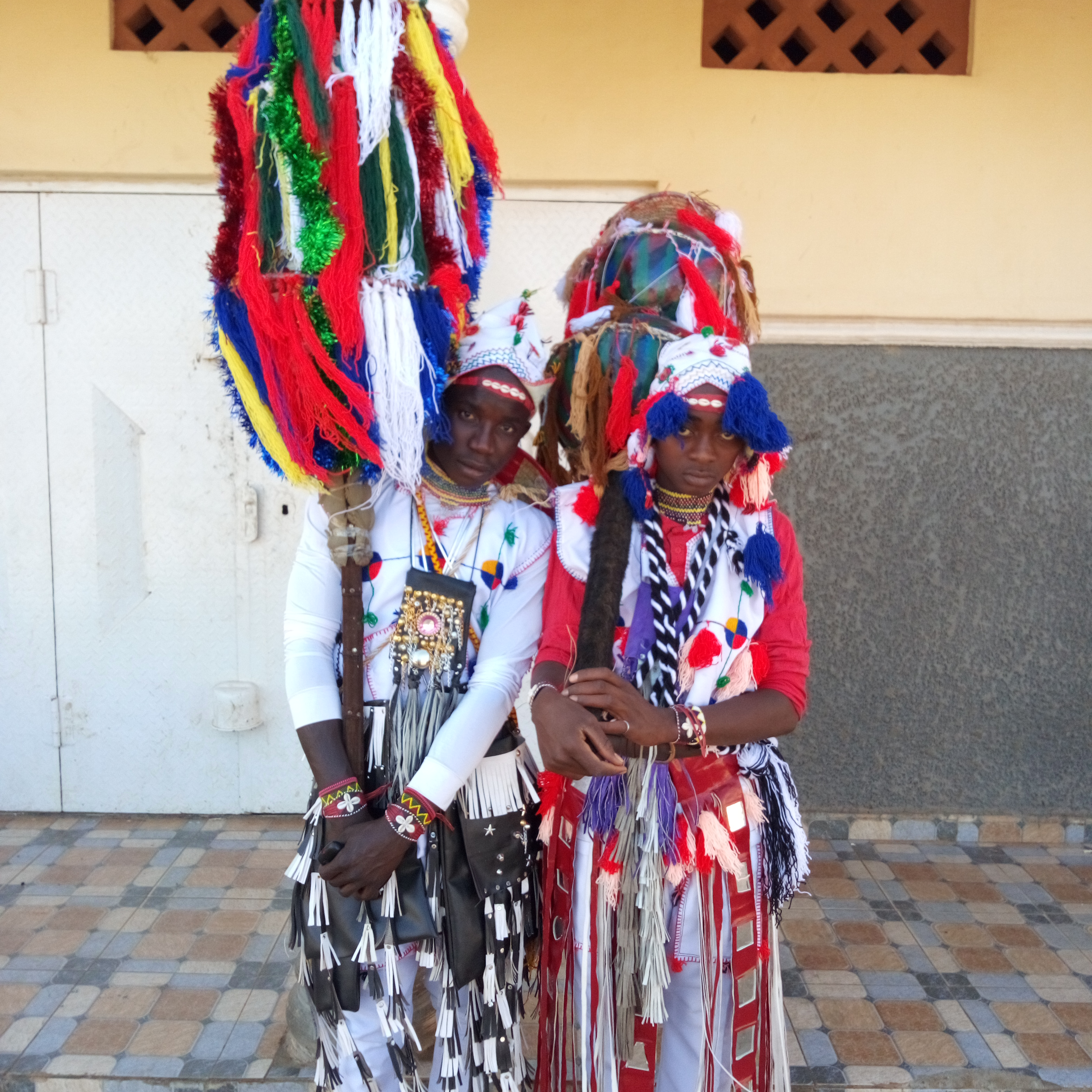
- Hausa-Fulanis during Eid Mubarak ceremony in Nigeria

Regions with significant populations
- Nigeria

Languages
- Hausa • Fula

Religion
- Islam

Related ethnic groups
- Other Hausa and Fulani

Hausa–Fulani are people of mixed Hausa and Fulani origin. They are primarily found in the Northern region of Nigeria, most of whom speak a variant of Hausa or Fula or both as their first language. The term Hausa–Fulani is also used mostly as a joint term to refer to both the monoethnic Hausa and Fula ethnic populations in Northern Nigeria.

While some Fulani claim Semitic origins, Hausas are indigenous to West Africa. This suggests that the processes of "Hausaization" in the western Sudan region was probably both cultural and genetic. The Hausa–Fulani identity came into being as a direct result of the migration of Fula people to Hausaland around the 14th century and their cultural assimilation into the Hausa society. At the beginning of the 19th century, Sheikh Usman dan Fodio led a successful jihad against the Hausa Kingdoms founding a centralized Fulani Empire (anglicized as the Sokoto Caliphate). After the jihad, Dan Fodio encouraged intermarriage between the immigrant Fula and the conquered Hausa states and locals mainly other Hausa people; in addition, Jobawa, Dambazawa and Sullubawa Fulani clans originating in Futa Tooro migrated to the region and intermarried with the local urban mainly Hausa elite, and were a major factor in the linguistic, cultural and ethnic mixing of the Hausa–Fulani people. As result of this assimilation, Hausa–Fulani form the core and vast majority of the populations of Daura, Zamfara, Kano, Katsina, Zaria, and Sokoto.

Hausa–Fulanis primarily speak variants of Hausa which form a dialect continuum of more-or-less mutually intelligible regional varieties. Hausa is spoken by over 100 to 150 million people across Africa, making it the most spoken Indigenous African language and the 11th most spoken language in the world. Since the Trans-Saharan trade, Hausa is used as a lingua franca spanning from Agadez deep in the Sahara Desert of Niger to Northern Nigeria, and has many loanwords from Arabic. For centuries, it utilized an Ajami script which served as the basis of the language scholarly tradition. The script was replaced with the Latin orthography of the Boko alphabets, after the British conquered the Sokoto Caliphate.

== Historical perspective ==
Kano, Nigeria

Hausa-Fulani Eid Mubarak ceremony

Medieval Arabic sources refers to the area as Sudan or as Bilad Al Sudan (English: Land of the Blacks; Arabic: بلاد السودان). This designation may have given rise to the term Negroland which was used by Europeans until the 19th century to refer to the inner poorly explored area north of the region of Guinea: consisting of the Slave Coast, Gold Coast, Grain Coast in West Africa.

Since the populations were partially affiliated with the Arab Muslim culture of North Africa, they started to trade and be referred to by the Arabic speakers as Al-Sudan (meaning "The Blacks") as they were considered an extended part of the Muslim world. There are early historical references by medieval Arab and Muslim historians and geographers which to refer to the Kanem-Bornu Empire as the region's major centre for Islamic civilization. It is likely that the medieval Hausa Kingdoms formed trading ties with the Bornu Empire, which became increasingly wealthy as the main African transshipment centre for the trans-Saharan slave trade. Hausa rulers also likely provided Sudanic peoples as a tributary to the Bornu Empire in order to avert war with the Empire.

The Sudan was gradually fulanised with the spread of Islam from the 7th century AD, when the liturgical language Arabic was first brought to the Sudan via Bornu. Until this point, the Fulani, a nomadic ethnic group primarily traversed the semi-desert Sahelian region, north of the Sudan, with cattle and avoided trade and intermingling with the Sudanic peoples. Fulanisation was at least partly strengthened in the rural areas in the early 16th century with the emigration of the settled Dambazawa wealthy trading clan from Bornu.

The Sokoto Caliphate emerged strong after the jihad under the leadership of Usman dan Fodio (1754–1817), whom a council proclaimed as the Amir al-Mu'minin or Commander of the Faithful. The empire with Arabic as its official language grew rapidly under his rule and that of his descendants, who sent out armies in every direction. The vast landlocked empire connected the East with the West Sudan region. As an Islamic state, authority is derived from piety and scholarship, thus the Sultan sent out emirs to establish suzerainty over the conquered territories and promote Islamic civilization, consolidating in order to establish administrative structures and a ruling elite. This settlement eventually gave rise to the gradual cultural assimilation of the Fulani culture by the Hausa people in major Hausa cities (or Hausa Bakwai) of: Daura, Biram, Kano, Katsina, Zazzau, Rano, and Gobir, leading to the mass education and promotion of Hausa language and culture through schools and later mass media, during the 20th century by the British.

== See also ==
- Fulani War
- Fula people
- Hausa people
- Sokoto Caliphate
- History of West Africa
