= Dambazawa =

Fulani clan mainly in Kano State, Nigeria

Fulani Dambazawa
- The 7th Leader of the Dambazawa Fulani Clan; Muhammad Adananu ɗan Malam Ali ɗan Kwairanga ɗan Dabon Dambazau (r.1942–1954)

Regions with significant populations
- Northern Nigeria

Languages
- Fulfulde Foreign Languages: English, Hausa, Arabic

Religion
- Sunni Islam

Related ethnic groups
- Fulani, Jobawa, Sullubawa, Yolawa, Muallimawa, Madinawa, Mundubawa, Danejawa, Zarawa, Yarimawa.

The Dambazawa (or Danbazawa) are a Fulani clan residing mainly in Kano State, Nigeria. They were among the key promoters, planners and executors of the Fulani jihad in Kano, which took place between 1804 and 1807 under the leadership of Shehu Usuman dan Fodiyo. The clan was said to be the top financiers of the jihad because it was said to be extremely wealthy at the time of the jihad. Other Fulani clans that participated in the jihad included: the Jobawa, the Yolawa, the Sullubawa, the Danejawa and others, as well as a contingent of the native Hausa people led by Malam Usuman bahaushe. Together, they formed a formidable force and toppled the 158-year Kutumbawa dynasty led by its last ruler Muhammad Alwali dan Yaji dan Dadi bakutumbe who ruled between 1781 and 1806.

== History and origin ==
The origin of the Dambazawa is as unclear as that of the Fulani race itself, but sources within the clan believe it to be of a Dayebe Fulani group. It was at the time of Sundiata Keita (c. 1217–1255 A.D.) that the Fulbe began adopting surnames that conformed to their socioeconomic groups. During that era, the socioeconomic group of a Pullo could easily be identified by considering his/her surname. It is unclear how this process came to be, but it is true that all Fulbe belong to one of four tribes: The Ururbe (Ba, Diakite), Dialloube (Diallo), Ferrobe (Sow) and Dayebe (Barry, Sangare). The Ba are considered to be a warrior group; the Diallo's geniuses; the Sow's, known to be religious, the guardians of the temple; the Barry were the nobility of the Fulbe.

The Dambazawa clan believes they migrated from Futa Tooro in what is now Senegal, with their whole clan consisting of their leaders, clerics, peasants and vocation castes (leyyi) that included; Jaawamɓe (courtesans/advisers), Maabuɓe (weavers), Wayilɓe Baleeɓe /sayakooɓe (blacksmiths/goldsmiths), Buurnaaɓe (ceramists), Sakkeeɓe (tanners), Lewɓe (woodworkers), Awluɓe (laudators), Wambaaɓe (guitarists) and Maccuɓe (slaves). Their sojourn eastward, took them through the Republics of Mali, Niger, Chad and Cameroun. Their migratory drift was characterized by settling in an area for months or years before moving on. They would raise their cattle, transact business, gain and disseminate Islamic knowledge in the areas they settled or passed through. For over two centuries they kept roaming until they arrived at the Kanem Empire in (Borno-Nigeria) and settled there. By the early 16th century, they left Borno and settled for a while in Damban in present-day Bauchi, Nigeria). From Damban they moved to Gasakoli (a place in Jigawa, Nigeria), then to an area in what was then the eastern part of the Kano Kingdom—known today as Dambazau in Takai. They remained in that area for a while. From there, they continued their westward movement, avoiding Kano city and settling in an area thirteen miles (twenty-one kilometres) north of the Kano city wall. Today this area is also known as Dambazau. After Kano city fell to the Fulani forces in 1806, their nobility, clerics and most of their Jaawando and Maccube moved into the walled city. There they occupied the House of Sarkin Bai, a compound north of the city, behind the city market called Jakara. Today that compound is also called Dambazau within the city wall. After the clan settled permanently in Kano, some of its members moved out to other areas. Wherever they settled they tended to name that area Dambazau.

The Dambazawa have a tradition of leaving behind some of their clan members and herds, whenever they decided to leave an area they have settled. Most of the time that area is named Dambazau meaning: "The abode of the Dambazawa". The Dambazawa believed that wherever they lived, in Nigeria or beyond, the area is called Dambazau. Today in Nigeria alone there are Dambazau villages in Kano, Katsina, Sokoto, Bauchi, Gombe and Muri (Taraba) states.

== Dambazawa during the jihad in Kano (1804–1807) ==
Kano has always been the most populous and wealthiest of the Hausa Kingdoms, and its capital was almost certainly the greatest city in the Sudan at the end of the 18th century. Kano's weather is well suited for cattle rearing. Kano had already been settled by a number of Fulani clans, which had already established themselves centuries before the jihad. According to the Kano Chronicle, the first wave of Fulani people arrived in Kano during the reign of the 19th ruler of Kano, Sarki Yakubu Dan Abdullahi Bar-ja who ruled between 1452 and 1463. Kano Fulani settlements were scattered throughout the Kingdom of Kano in such a way that they formed a ring round the walled capital city. The settlement of the Dambazawa was situated north of the city wall and their leader at the end of the 18th century was Modibbo Muhammadu Yunusa Ummaru popularly called Dabon Dambazau.

The Fulani of Kano had already been in contact with Shehu (Usman dan Fodiyo) long before his breach with the Gobir King Yunfa (reign: 1802–1808), The leader of the Dambazawa alongside two other prominent Fulani clan members, Modibbo Sulemanu bii Abuhama of the Mundubawa clan, and Modibbo Muhammadu Ummaru popularly called Mallam Bakatsine of the Jobawa clan, were already studying under Shehu and were with him at the time of his flight to Gudu, after which, he sent them back to Kano with the task of rallying the faithful. The first thing Malam Dabo did after his return from Gudu was to rally his Dambazawa clan, and then proceeded, together with other Fulani clan leaders, to rally the Kano, Fulani and Hausa faithful.

The Dambazawa participated fully in all the major battles of the jihad in Kano from its beginnings in 1804 to its end in 1807, contributing in every way, especially in terms of military logistics and intelligence. The entire jihad force camped in the northern part of the Kingdom of Kano (i.e. Tomas—an area with a water pond presently in Danbatta district) for almost a year before the final assault was made on the walled capital city of Kano in 1806. This part of the kingdom (Danbatta) happens to be an area the Dambazawa were very conversant with because their settlement Dambazau was located there.

== Dambazawa after the jihad in Kano ==
The Dambazawa were said to be a very united Fulani clan and were extremely devoted to their leader Malam Dabo. They followed, obeyed and protect him anywhere, anytime. After the jihad was successful, the Fulani consolidated their power by defeating the remnants of the Kano forces under the leadership of the ousted king (King Alwali) in the walled town of Burumburum in 1807. For almost three years (1806–1808/9) Kano was without central leadership (an Emir). It was administered collegially by the leaders of the Kano Jihad; Malam Jibir and Malam Abdurrahman of the Yolawa Clan, Malam Bakatsine of the Jobawa clan, Malam Jamo of the Sullubawa Clan, Malam Usman Bahaushe of the Hausa faithful and Malam Dabo of the Dambazawa Clan. By late 1808 or early 1809, the Kano Fulani decided to visit Shehu Usman and raised the issue of leadership in Kano. They were to meet with Shehu at Birnin Gada in Zamfara, but Shehu was unable to make the journey and was represented by his son Sheik Muhammadu Bello (who later became sultan after the death of Shehu in 1817) who appointed Modibbo Sulemanu of the Mundubawa clan as the Amir of Kano. Though Sulemanu belonged to the Mundubawa Clan, and was said to be with Shehu at the time of his flight to Gudu, he did not make the Hijra to Kwazazzabon ´yar-kwando (also called Fagoje: a place thirty-eight miles (sixty-one kilometres) west of Kano city, where the Fulani made camp before starting the jihad in Kano). Nor did he participate in the Kano Jihad struggles. He lived for the whole time within Kano city as an Imam. His appointment did not go down well with the Kano Jihadists. After their return from Birnin Gada, things were calm for a while, but the style of Amir Sulemanu's leadership of Kano did not sit well with most of the prominent Fulani clan leaders, who saw his actions/omissions as undermining the successes achieved by the Jihadists in Kano. They opposed many of his policies and Malam Dabo became the embodiment of that opposition.

Malam Dabo later asked the hand in marriage of Shehu's daughter and it was given. This deepened the already complicated relationship between the Dambazawa and Emir Sulemanu. Sulemanu saw this as an affront to his authority by Dabo, as he was also said to be married to another of Shehu's daughters. At the height of this conflict, Sulemanu seized some parts of Dabo's fiefdom (Kunya district among some other villages) and imprisoned Malam Dabo in the royal prison, but the Dambazawa went to the prison by nightfall and freed him. Again Emir Sulemanu, acting upon the advice of former Kano rulers' (Alwali) advisers, started disseminating propaganda that Malam Dabo would be killed on a certain date. But that date came and passed with nothing happening to Malam Dabo. Then another day would be announced. This series of pronouncements terrified most of the Dambazawa, but Dabo was unperturbed and kept calming them saying "nothing would happen". But their fear kept increasing by the day, so they continued to urge him to leave for Sokoto (to Shehu). They later prevailed over him and Dabo left Kano for Sokoto. Upon hearing that Dabo left for Sokoto, Emir Sulemanu rode after him to Sokoto, fearing what Dabo might tell Shehu. After they both arrived before Shehu, he reconciled and made peace between them, and they returned to Kano. This happened between 1810 and 1811 A.D. From that day, Dabo and the Dambazawa removed themselves from the activities of the Emirate, but Dabo retained his seat at the council of Ulama (Clerics) which consisted of all the clan leaders.

Shehu Usman retired from administering the caliphate in 1815 and handed over the administration to his brother Abdullahi Fodiyo and son Muhammadu Bello. He later died in 1817 A.D. and upon his death Muhammadu Bello succeeded him as the commander of the faithful (Sultan). Emir Sulemanu died in 1819, but not before he wrote a letter to Sultan Muhammadu Bello requesting the appointment of Modibbo Ibrahim Dabo from the Sullubawa clan as Emir in the event of his death. In his letter, he accused Malam Dabon Dambazau of haughtiness and Malam Dikko (of the Jobawa clan) of oppressive tendencies and urged Sultan Bello not to appoint either of them in the event of his death. He recommended the appointment of Malam Ibrahim Dabo of the Sullubawa, who happened to be his student at one time. Their parents, Modibbo Abuhama and Modibbo Mahmudu (known as Malam Mai Dan Gwado) were very close friends.

By the time Emir Sulemanu died in 1819, the Dambazawa had already established themselves as a force to be reckon with. They were gunning for their leader to be appointed the next Amir of Kano and had the backing of not only the majority of the Fulani clans but also the Hausa peasants. But as fate would have it, when the Emir's seat became vacant the name of Dabon Dambazau was forwarded to the Sultan, Muhammed Bello, but he had already made up his mind to grant the wish of the late Emir Sulemanu by appointing Malam Ibrahim Dabo of the Sullubawa clan as his successor. The sultan overlooked Malam Dabo and said that Malam Dabo should be Sarkin Baya. To date, no one knows precisely what the sultan meant by this because the phrase has different meanings in the Hausa language. This was the reason Malam Dabo's supporters and admirers were calling him Sarkin Baya or Sarkin bai (as both baya and bai roughly have the same meaning in the Hausa language) which roughly translates as; "The Emir to come after" (i.e. after Ibrahim Dabo). Although his adversaries, and those who loathed him, also called him Sarkin bai, but they called him that as a mockery, as it can also mean; "The Emir who came last" (i.e. who lost being selected to be crowned as emir) or "The King of slaves" (as Bai can also mean "slave" in classical Hausa language). Some historians believed that, prior to Muhammad Bello's pronouncement Malam Dabo was already referred to as Sarkin Bai by virtue of him occupying the official residence of Habe Sarki Bai, but was not formally turbaned as such. So they believed that Muhammad Bello said he should be "Sarkin baya" in reference to his already established name "Sarkin Bai", and this paved way for Dabo to be formally appointed to the official title of Sarkin Bai.

When Malam Ibrahim Dabo ascended the emirship of Kano, he decided not to have any conflict with the Dambazawa. He adopted a different approach from that of Emir Sulemanu. He officially appointed Dabo to the office of Sarkin bai, and placed him in charge of all the territories ranging from between Ungogo 2 to 4 mi (3.2 to 6.4 km) north of Kano city to Kunchi near the northwestern boundaries of the Kano Emirate with the Katsina and Daura Emirates and Babura near the northeastern boundary of Kano with Damagaran (now Zinder in the Niger Republic) as their fiefdom. And he restored to him Kunya and the other villages, which Emir Sulemanu had seized from him during their disagreement. To formalise the new situation with the Dambazawa, he appointed his daughter Fatsumatu Zara (daughter of his senior wife Shekara) to the title of Magajiya ( the first Fulani Magajiya in Kano). He then gave Fatsumatu to Dabo as a bride, together with Kunchi as a marriage gift, thus publicly demonstrating his reconciliation with the Dambazawa.

The fiefdom of the Dambazawa happens to include Danbatta town, which at that time was the headquarters of a rebellious Fulani clan leader named Ibrahim Dan Tunku of the Yarimawa Fulani clan of Shiddar. Dan Tunku began rebelling against the Emirate of Kano during the reign of Emir Sulemanu, by Conquering and harassing villages in northern Kano, he carved out a sizable Kingdom for himself at the expanse of the Kano Emirate. A portion of Dambazawa forces were the vanguard that fought Dan Tunku and kept him at bay whilst the forces of Kano were busy fighting revolts that broke out in other areas of the Kano Emirate after the appointment of Ibrahim Dabo as Emir. After the revolts were subdued, the Kano forces led by Emir Ibrahim Dabo himself, joined the Dambazawa forces and then proceeded to plan and executed a final assault on Dan Tunku at Danbatta town, where they defeated him. But, Dan Tunku was able to escape through the northern gate of Danbatta Town. Kano forces pursued him until they reached a pond that separated Danbatta and the hills of Kazaure. The Emir dismounted from his horse and ordered a camp to be set up. A local legend has it that while the Emir was napping in his tent, he dreamed of Shehu Usman, and in that dream Shehu told him that "this pond is the border between you and Dan Tunku". When the Emir awoke, he asked his forces to withdraw to Danbatta, whereupon Dantunku's house was razed to the ground. The Emir then left for Kano and the Dambazawa left some of their clan members to bring the town to order. They built a house beside the destroyed house of Dan Tunku and appointed Dantunku's brother (who had earlier surrendered) as Sarkin Fulanin Danbatta. Dambazawa then made Danbatta the capital of their larger fiefdom and their military base against Dan Tunku. Danbatta became Kano's northern fortress where they governed and defended Kano from all northern aggression. To date, the Dambazawa are those controlling Danbatta and its environs, though they no longer control the whole of the northern Kano emirate. They still operate as the fief owners of Danbatta and Makoda. Modibbo Muhammadu Yunusa Ummaru Ba-dambaje died in 1845 and was buried under a date palm tree at his house at Dambazau, inside the walled city of Kano. He died one to three months earlier than Emir Ibrahim Dabo (Ibrahim Dabo died in 1846) and did not live to become the Emir of Kano. After his death, his son Muhammadu Kwairanga was appointed Sarkin Bai of Kano and continued operating as the fief owner of Northern Kano.

Muhammadu Kwairanga, after becoming the Sarkin bai of Kano and leader of the Dambazawa clan, decided to choose ten people from the Dambazawa to help him administer the fiefdom. He gave them titles and offices and called them Yan goma (the ten councilors). The titles include: Waziri, Madaki, Makama, Galadima, Wanbai, Ciroma, Tafida, Muqaddas, Dawaki and Santali.

== Dambazawa in modern Kano Emirate ==
Today, the Dambazawa are those controlling the districts of Danbatta and Makoda. Their leader, who always holds the title of Sarkin Bai, is a permanent member of the Kano State Emirate Council and the secretary of the Kano King Makers Council (i.e. Kano Emirate Electoral College) which consist of Madakin Kano from the Ba'awa (Yolawa) clan as chairman of the council, Sarkin Ban Kano from the Dambazawa clan as secretary, Makaman Kano from the Jobawa clan and Sarkin Dawaki mai Tutar Kano from the Sullubawa clan (who were the descendants of Malam Jamo the leader of the Sullubawa during the Jihad and the custodian of the Kano Jihad flag) as members. This council is responsible for choosing a new Emir whenever the seat becomes vacant. They forward his name to the Kano State Executive Council for subsequent approval.

== The title of Sarkin Ban Kano ==
Sarkin Bai is a title in Kano Emirate that is reserved exclusively for the leader of the Dambazawa Fulani Clan. Whoever is chosen as Sarkin Ban Kano automatically becomes the leader of the Danbazawa clan, the Secretary of the Kano King makers Council and District head of Danbatta local Government.

== Chronology of Sarkin Ban Kano (1819 - to date) ==
1. Sarkin Bai Modibbo Muhammad Yunusa Dabo ɗan Ummaru (1819-1845).
2. Sarkin Bai Modibbo Muhammad Kwairanga ɗan Modibbo Dabo (1845-1886).
3. Sarkin Bai Muhammad Bashari (Alhaji) ɗan Kwairanga dan Dabo (1886-1894).
4. Sarkin Bai Abdussalam ɗan Zailani ɗan Dabo (1894-1907).
5. Sarkin Bai Abdulqadir ɗan Abuba ɗan Dabo (1908-1938).
6. Sarkin Bai Umar Dikko ɗan Abdurrahman (Goshi) ɗan Dabo (1938-1942).
7. Sarkin Bai Muhammad Adnan ɗan Aliyu ɗan Kwairanga (1942-1954).
8. Sarkin Bai Muktar ɗan Adnan ɗan Aliyu ɗan Kwairanga (1954- 2021).
9. Sarkin Bai Mansur ɗan Muktar ɗan Adnan (2022 to date).

== Notable members of the Dambazawa Clan ==
- Professor Bello Bako Danbatta, former Vice Chancellor Bayero University Kano (1995-1999)
- Lieutenant General Abdulrahman Bello Dambazau, former chief of army staff, Federal Republic of Nigeria (2008-2010), and former Honorable Minister of the Interior (2015-2019), Federal Republic of Nigeria.
- Dr. Mansur Mukhtar, Nigerian economist, former Nigerian Federal Minister of Finance (2008 -2010), former director World Bank, former vice chairman, Islamic Development Bank.
- Air Marshal Muhammad Dikko Umar, former chief of air staff, Nigerian Air-force (2010-2012).
- Late Alh. (Dr.) Mukhtar Adnan; former leader of the Dambazawa, former Sarkin bai of Kano, former Secretary Kano Kingmakers Council and former district head of Danbatta from 1954 to 2020, one-time member and chief whip of the Nigerian House of Assembly in the first republic, and also the first commissioner of education of old Kano State.
- Late Mal. Lawan Dambazau, Co-founders of Northern Elements Progressive Union (NEPU) during the independence period, later elected to the Kano State House of Assembly under Peoples Redemption Party.
- Late Alh.Maje Adnan, former Wanbai of Dambazawa, former secretary to the Kano Emirate Council and later Majidadin Kano District head of Madobi before his death in 1995.
- Late Alh. Umar Dikko Sarkin Fulanin Ja'idanawa, district head of Garki, Jigawa.
- Late Alh. (Dr.) Wada Waziri Ibrahim, former Waziri of the Dambazawa and former Sa'i of Kano District head of Makoda.
- Alh. Muhammad Maje Adnan, present Wanbai of the Dambazawa clan and former administrative manager of the Electric Meter Company of Nigeria (EMCON) Zaria.
- Arc. Aminu Dabo former commissioner for the Kano State Ministry of Land and Physical planning and also former managing director of the Nigerian Ports Authority
- Brigadier General Idris Bello Dambazau, former commissioner for special duties Kano State.
