= Daura Emirate =

Daura Emirate Masarautar Daura Al Amir Al Daura
- Location in Nigeria
- Coordinates: 13°2′11″N 8°19′4″E
- Country: Nigeria
- State: Katsina State

Government
  - Emir: Faruk Umar Faruk
- Elevation: 474 m (1,555 ft)

The Daura Emirate is a religious and traditional state in Northern Nigeria, the Emir of Daura still rules as a ceremonial hereditary monarch, and maintains a palace. Muhammad Bashar became the emir in 1966, reigning for 41 years until his death in 2007, On 28 February 2007, Umar Faruk Umar became Emir of Daura succeeding Muhammad Bashar. Alh Sabiu Ibrahim Dantawai become the chairman of daura 2014

== History ==
=== Origins ===
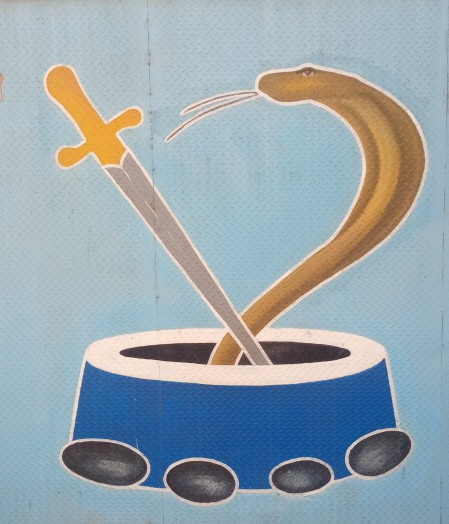
Daura Emirates

The Girgam mentions that the Daura Emirate was established in 2000 BC and it all began from Canaan with a man called Najibu who migrated with a group of people to Ancient Egypt. They settled in Ancient Egypt for a while and had very close relations with the Copts. They moved on to Tripoli and their leader who was then Abdudar sought to rule over the people but was unsuccessful, so he moved on with his people to a place called Tsohon Birni today in Northern Nigeria and it was this event that paved the way for the establishment of the Daura Emirate and city. Daura is the city that Bayajidda, a figure from Hausa mythology, arrived at after his trek across the Sahara. Once there, he killed a snake (named Sarki) who prevented the people from drawing water from the well known as Kusugu, and the local queen Daurama Shawata, married him out of gratitude; one of their seven children was named Daura. The Kusugu well in Daura where Bayajidda is said to have slain Sarki is protected by a wooden shelter and has become a tourist attraction.

The emirate is referred to as one of the "seven true Hausa states" (Hausa Bakwai) because it was, (along with Biram, Kano, Katsina, Zazzau, Gobir, and Rano), ruled by the descendants of Bayajidda's sons with Daurama and Magira (his first wife). The University of California's African American Studies Department refers to Daura, as well as Katsina, as having been "ancient seats of Islamic culture and learning."

=== Modern history ===
In 1805, during the Fulani War, Daura was taken over by Fulani warrior Malam Ishaku, who set up an emirate. The Hausa set up rival states nearby, and the ruler of one, Malam Musa, was made the new emir of Daura by the British in 1904. Once part of Kaduna State, Daura became part of the new Katsina State in 1987. Faruk Umar Faruk became the 60th Emir of Daura on 28 Feb 2007 following the death of Sarkin Muhammadu Bashar dan Umaru.

== Rulers ==
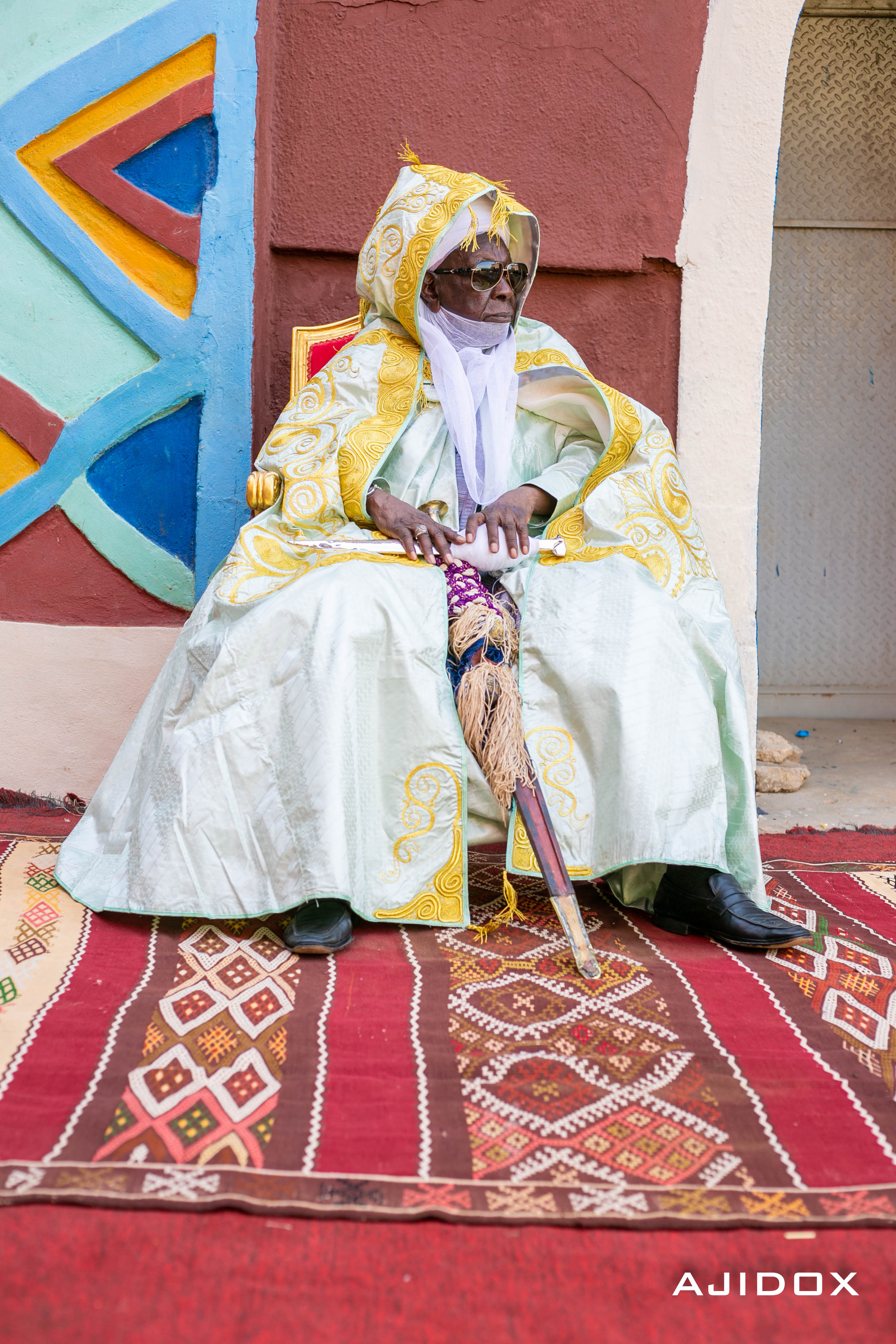
Sarki Umar Faruk Umar

=== Early time Hausa emirs ===
- Abduldari
- Kufuru.
- Gino
- Yakumo
- Yakunya
- Walzamu
- Yanbamu
- Gizirgizir
- Innagari
- Daurama
- Gamata
- Shata
- Batatuma
- Sandamata
- Jamatu
- Hamata
- Zama
- Shawa
- Bawo
- Yar kasa

=== Fulani dynasty ===
- Malam Isiyaku
- Malam Yusufu
- Malam Muhammadu Sani
- Malam Zubairu
- Malam Muhammadu Bello
- Malam Muhammadu Altine
- Malam Muhammadu Mai Gardo
- Buntarawa Sogiji
- Magajiya Murnai

=== Zango's Rival Kingdom ===
- Sarkin Gwani Abdu
- Sarki Lukudi ɗan Tsoho
- Sarki Nuhu ɗan Lukudi
- Sarki Mamman Sha ɗan Sarkin Gwani Abdu
- Sarki Haruna ɗan Sarki Lukudi
- Sarki Ɗan’aro ɗan Sarkin Gwani Abdu
- Sarki Tafida ɗan Sarki Nuhu
- Sarki Sulaiman ɗan Sarkin Gwani Abdu
- Sarki Yusufu ɗan Sarki Lukudi
- Sarki Tafida ɗan Sarki Nuhu (a Karo na biyu)

=== Baure Rival Kingdom ===
- Dan Shufini dan Khalifa (c. early period)
- Tsoho dan Dan Shufini (until 1847)
- Habu dan Tsoho (first reign, 1847–1850)
- Jibo dan Tsoho (first reign, 1850–1854)
- Habu dan Tsoho (second reign, 1854–1859)
- Jibo dan Tsoho (second reign, 1859–1865)
- Ali dan Tsoho (first reign, 1865–1874)
- Zakari dan Habu (first reign as ruler, 1874–1887)
- Muhamman Kalgaba dan Tsoho (1887–1888)
- Ali dan Tsoho (second reign, 1888–1890)
- Zakari dan Habu (second reign, 1890–1894)
- Abdu dan Habu (1894–1903)
- Khaliru dan Tsoho (1903–1906)

=== Hausa dynasty ===
- Sarki Musa ɗan Sarki Nuhu
- Sarki Abdurrahman ɗan Sarki Musa
- Sarki Muhammadu Bashar
- Sarki Umar Faruq Umar

== See also ==
- Daura
- Kwasarawa
- Kusugu
- Kabara
- Bayajidda
- Muhammadu Buhari

== Bibliography ==
- S. J. Hogben und Anthony Kirk-Greene: The Emirates of Northern Nigeria, London 1966 ("Daura", p. 145-155).
- Dierk Lange: Ancient Kingdoms of West Africa, Dettelbach 2004 ("Daura", p. 219-233).
- Michael Smith: The Affairs of Daura: History and Change in a Hausa State - 1800-1958, Berkeley 1978.
