= Matthew Seiyefa =

Nigerian security agent (born 1960)

Director General of the State Security Service
- In office 7 August 2018 – 14 September 2018
- President: Muhammadu Buhari
- Preceded by: Lawal Musa Daura
- Succeeded by: Yusuf Magaji Bichi

Personal details
- Born: 17 October 1960 (age 65) Ekeremor, Bayelsa State, Nigeria

Matthew Seiyefa MNI (born 17 October 1960) is a Nigerian security and intelligence chief who was the Director General of the State Security Service from 7 August 2018 until 14 September 2018; he was appointed by Acting President, Prof. Yemi Osinbajo.

== Background and education ==
He was born in October 1960 in Ekeremor in Bayelsa State, southern Nigeria. He received a bachelor's degree from University of Jos in 1982 and also trained at the National Institute for Policy and Strategic Studies, Kuru, Nigeria.

In 1984, Seiyefa joined the National Security Organization (NSO) which was later reorganised in 1986, and led to the creation of three agencies: the State Security Service (SSS), the National Intelligence Agency (NIA) and the Defence Intelligence Agency (DIA). He eventually became Director of the Institute of Security Studies in Abuja

== Director of the State Security Service ==
On 7 August 2018, Acting President Yemi Osinbajo appointed Seiyefa as Director General of the State Security Service following the sack of Lawal Musa Daura. On 14 September 2018, President Muhammadu Buhari removed Seiyefa replacing him with Yusuf Magaji Bichi.
