= Federal Medical Centre, Daura =

Hospital in Daura, Katsina State

Federal Medical Centre

Geography
- Location: Daura, Northern, Katsina State, Nigeria

Organisation
- Type: General

Services
- Emergency department: Available

Links
- Lists: Hospitals in Nigeria

Federal Medical Centre Daura is a federal hospital in Daura, Katsina State, Nigeria. The Chief Medical Director (CMD) is Umar Faruk Abdumajid.

== History ==
Following a bill which was signed into law, the General Hospital Daura was fully upgraded to a Federal Medical Centre in 2023.

Fifty hectares of land was donated by the Katsina state government to the Federal Ministry of Health for the construction and realization of the project.
