= Muhammad Alwali II =

- Sarkin Kano

Ruler of Kano
- Reign: 1781–1807
- Predecessor: Daud Abasama II
- Successor: Sultanate Abolished; Suleimanu (as Sarkin Kano)
- Born: Gidan Rumfa, Kano
- Died: 1807
- Burial: Burum-Burum, Kano
- House: Bagauda (Kutumbawa)
- Father: Yaji II

Muhammad Dan Yaji, known as Muhammad Alwali II (died 1807) was the last sultan of the Sultanate of Kano. His reign coincided with a period of upheavals in Sudanic History that saw a series of religious Jihads waged by the Fula People. In 1807, after a protracted struggle with Fula clans, Muhammad Alwali was ambushed and assassinated at Burum-Burum in modern Kano. His death marked the end of the Kutumbawa line of Hausa aristocrats in Kano and the fall of the 800 year old Bagauda Dynasty.

== Accession ==
Muhammad Alwali was the son of Sultan Yaji II and Baiwa. In 1781 he succeeded his brother, Dauda Abasama II, to become the third successive son of Yaji II to ascend the throne of Kano.

=== Reign ===
The Kano Sultanate was consistently at war to maintain hold of trade routes and his reign came at a time when famine was a regular occurrence. These factors coupled with increased taxation by the aristocracy saw dwindling fortunes for the Sultanate. Traders were abandoning the state for more favorable conditions in the Sahel. When Alwali became Sultan, he immediately collected grains of sorghum and millet to prepare for war and famine. However, a famine devastated the city soon after.

=== Dirki ===
Dirki was a fetish object that was held sacred in Kano. It was made of a Quran covered in multiple layers of goat skin or cow hide introduced around the 16th century in the reign of Muhammad Zaki. Alwali was asked to provide forty cows as a sacrifice to Dirki but he refused. He went as far as attacking the object with an axe and exposing its contents. The people then murmured that he will be expelled from Kano just as he expelled the Quran from Dirki.

=== Ciroma Dan Mama ===
Over time, the Kano royal family had been divided into multiple factions. Since the first civil war in 1565, internal strife had ravaged the Kano royal house. A second civil war broke out after El Kutumbi's death in 1648.

Alwali's father Yaji, endured a bitter relationship with his brother, the then Sultan Muhammad Sharefa and his sons who succeeded him. Yaji was exiled to a desolate life of penury. During this time, he heavily relied on a local farmer and tobacco seller from Katagum. When Yaji ascended the throne after the death of Alhaji Kabe, he adopted this figure as his son and gave him the prestigious title of Ciroma (Crown Prince), and entrusted the resources needed for the ascension of his sons in his hands. It is believed that this figure or his son, called Dan Mama was stripped of the title of Ciroma during Alwali's reign who instead gave the title to his son. The deposed Ciroma, though scorned, continued to play a role in the Sultan's court and would later play a pivotal role in his downfall. Tradition relates that his treachery sealed Alwali's fate.

== War with the Fula ==
=== Background ===
Alwali was already facing a struggle in securing his throne and the ascension of his son against the faction loyal to the lineage of his uncle Muhammad Sharefa and another faction that contained the remnants of the Rumfawa in Kano who had engaged in a series of rebellions since Sharefa's time. While he was able to successfully squash a revolt by the Rumfawa, unbeknownst to him, a more serious threat was looming. When Shehu Usman Dan Fodio's Jihad began in Gobir, he sent a letter to all Hausa Kings who had already sworn to support the King of Gobir. It is related that Muhammad Alwali was on the verge of accepting the Shehu's message when he was dissuaded by Ciroma Dan Mama. The Ciroma is said to have then written to the Shehu offering his support in exchange for a hundred towns.

Kano was home to a number of Fula clans who had begun settling since the 14th century including the Jobawa, Sullubawa, Danejawa, Yolawa, Yerimawa, Modibawa, Gyanawa, Zarawa, Toronkawa, Mundubawa, and Dambazawa. Many Fula chiefs had assumed various powerful titles in Kano, including the leadership of various towns and in the time of Kumbari Dan Sharefa, he had to extinguish a revolt by the Fula chief of Ringim, Ada Gauro and send him into exile but his descendants played a role in the war that ensued. The Kutumbawa Kings had alienated themselves from their masses through their heavy taxation and open syncreticisms and the Fula also found allies in hausa Muslims and aggrieved peasants in Kano, led by Alkali Mallam Usman. These Hausas according to WF Gowers may have been just as many as the Fula. Muhammad Bakatsine, the leader of the Jobawa, who were one of the most established Fula clans in Kano, had been with Dan Fodio in Gobir but returned to Kano after the Fulas defeat by Gobir at Tsuntua. The Shehu soon sent a letter to his supporters in Kano after which they withdrew from their communities and assembled in preparation for Jihad.

=== Early encounters ===
A group of the Shehu's followers made for Kwazzazabo where they frightened the villagers and seized their grains and in the ensuing scuffle slew one of the farmers who had refused them access to his stock of grains. The Sarkin Bebeji immediately alerted Sultan Alwali who was then situated at the newly reinforced Takai. The Sultan in trying to assess the situation sent a small force led by Gainaku and instructed him to burn the Fula compounds and seize whatever he pleased from them. Gainaku though succeeding in killing some of the fula was forced to retreat. Alwali then sent for Muhammad Bakatsine and accused him of treachery. The clan leader however denied any involvement and swore his innocence on a Quran but on his way back proceeded to seize the town of Gogel.

After consultation with his advisers, Alwali who still underestimated the severity of his situation then sent a military general, Barde Bakori with a force he deemed sufficient to disband the rebels but was also turned back. When the Barde returned to Alwali who had at that point left Takai and returned to Kano, the Sultan faced different opinions from his advisers with one faction calling for a declaration of war and the other faction seeking a more diplomatic approach. The Sultan had initially wanted to accept the Shehu's call and he opted for the latter view. He put together a delegation which included Arab and local scholars who were granted an audience by the rebels but publicly humiliated and turned back. One of the delegates was said to have died of fright shortly after returning to Kano.

=== Kano's first assault ===
After rejecting his offer for peace, Alwali and his advisers decided to summon a faction of his troops led by the Sarkin Dawaki Ali and ordered them to capture the fula leaders and women but to slay everyone else. Before they got to the Fula stronghold in Kwazzazabo, the rebels had already shored up their defenses while their leaders had withdrawn to Kogo in anticipation. When the Sarkin Dawaki and his troops broke initial resistance and made it into the fula settlement, he instructed the Barde to set their huts on fire but the Barde insisted that they had to collect the Shehus flag first. This hesitation proved costly; As soon as the Barde collected the flag, he was greeted by a hoard of Fula warriors and even women. The hausa horses were spooked by the pandemonium and in their retreat, the cavalry was confined to a narrow space due to trenches built by the Fula and were chased by a rain of arrows and spears. A lot of their soldiers fell off their horses and died, the Sarkin Dawaki barely escaped. The Fula gained horses, muskets, coats of mail, armors, swords, quilted armors, and many other weapons.

=== Expansion of the Jihad ===
In the wake of the Fula victory against the Sarkin Dawaki, Sarkin Fulanin Dambarta, Malam Maiyaki, also known as Dan Tunku, who later founded the Kazaure Emirate switched his allegiance from Alwali to the Shehu. Alwali did not learn of this perfidy until it was too late. The Fula now also had the confidence and firepower to move across Kano. They soon made for the town of Godiya but were repelled with many losses by Dan Tama, the ancestral ruler of Godiya. They eventually broke their defenses and burnt the city to the ground and neighboring towns submitted to avoid the same fate. During their expeditions, they also pillaged Fula herders who wouldn't join their Jihad. They then took Karaye after a small resistance but immediately saw an army led by the Dan Tama of Godiya and Barde Bakori. Neither side expected to encounter the other. The Dan Tama and Barde attacked nonetheless but the Fula had taken up strong positions around the river bed and repelled their attackers. Karaye was the first major town to fall to the Fula. While in Karaye, Mallam Musa arrived and was given the Flag for the Jihad against Zazzau after which he proceeded to his destination.

In order to use their superior mobility and field knowledge, as well as to avoid the possibility of facing the combined forces of Kano, Katsina, and Daura, the fula dispersed their armies to force Alwali to do the same. They soon converged near Tofa and were promptly attacked by a small Hausa force from Tatarawa and Damargu which they repelled and captured many horses from. The Fula captured Tofa, Bichi and then Tatarawa.

=== Enlisting of Tuaregs ===
Alwali decided to acquire the services of the Tuaregs of Adar led by Tambari Agumbil who had experience fighting against the Fula in Gobir. Agumbil received the handsome sum of four million cowries to come into Alwalii's service. Agumbil's forces were strengthened by a band of hausa warriors with whom he attacked the Fula at Tatarawa. Their attack sent the Fula to flight but they soon retaliated with a flurry of arrows aimed at the Hausa wing and Agumbil came to their aid, immediately losing his life in the process. His forces were in disarray and a massacre ensued. They followed the retreating forces to Tomas and collected prisoners and booty.

=== Successes ===
The Sultan decided to change his tactic. He reinforced his experienced soldiers and directed them to engage in minor assaults but to avoid open battles, hoping that attrition would wear the rebels out. His new strategy yielded positive results and afforded the hausa army the time to regroup. The Sultan then sent out raiders as a decoy to fool the rebels and in the resulting battle, the Fula lost many soldiers and were forced to retreat. The Fula then proceeded to take Madaci and Jalli but lost Malam Dan Zabuwa in the process.

=== Battle of Dan Yaya ===
After Madaci and Jalli fell, the Sultan himself set out of Kano with a large force which included a heavy cavalry of seven hundred horsemen. He soon took and razed Dawaki which was situated between Madaci and Jalli. His army then occupied the town but were subject to constant harassment by a concentrated force of rebels using arrows and guerrilla tactics, trying to draw his cavalry out to open field.

It was here that Alwali learned of his betrayal by Ciroma Dan Mama and Sarkin Fulanin Danbarta who both reinforced Fula forces. The Ciroma's forces would account for a significant portion of Kano's army. Alwali proceeded to Dan Yaya and while reinforcements from Bornu were impeded by a Fula blockade, he welcomed the Sultans of Katsina and Daura and their armies. The Fula were however further reinforced by their kin from Ringim, Jahun and other areas.

At Dan Yaya, three to four months of fighting took place and it is said that up to ninety three fights took place within this period. The Sultan however did not fully commit his army until the last three days. It is possible he was waiting for further reinforcements from Daura, Katsina, Bornu and other placers but this did not materialize.

Alwali then took to the battlefield himself and launched a heavy attack on the rebel stronghold in Sabon Ruwa and many houses were burnt. However, the rebels were soon reinforced by their allies in neighboring areas. Alwali was then pushed back from Sabon Ruwa with both sides recording heavy losses. The Sultans army attacked again in the evening and more reinforcements came to Alwali's aid from Daura. Kano forces launched a less intense attack in the morning. During this time, the Fula camp was running short of supplies and contemplated retreating to Gaya to instead aid Muhammad Bakatsine who had so far been unable to capture what would be perhaps the most important town in Kano. They argued against this retreat believing it would reinvigorate the Sultan and his army's morale, instead deciding to roll the dice on one last major attack. The Fula came out in the open field and the Sultans army immediately charged. The battle started from Maghrib prayers (around 7:00PM) until Subhi Prayers (around 5:00AM) when the Fula were able to stealthily set fire to the Hausa camp which contained their women and supplies. On seeing this, the Hausa retreated towards their tents and the battle soon became a slaughter in favor of the Fula.

As the fire razed through their bivouacs, Alwali fled for Kano with his sons and other officials. The Sultans of Katsina and Daura also fled home with what was left of their armies while the remaining soldiers fought a losing battle against the rampaging rebels. The Fula took most of Kano soon after.

=== Fall of Kano and exile to Zazzau ===
After his crushing defeat at Dan Yaya, Alwali reviewed his situation with his advisors and clerics. He once again sent another delegation to the rebels, agreeing to surrender to their demands while remaining in office as a tributary. His offer was rejected and was told that dialogue was not an option and that they would attack Kano on the 12th of Rabiʽ al-Awwal. He fled Kano for Zazzau forty days before the due date.

=== Last stand ===
While the Kano Chronicle suggests he was immediately turned out of Zazzau, it is widely accepted that he stayed in Zazzau for a few months. During this time, Gaya, which was ruled by the lineage of Alwali's grandmother resisted the forces of Muhammad Bakatsine and remained loyal to the Sultan. This inspired Alwali to make one last stand. He ordered Sarkin Gaya Gujabu to launch an attack on Muhammad Bakatsine who had moved and assembled a force at Wudil. Gujabu was defeated with heavy losses. Gaya was soon overrun by the forces of Muhammad Bakatsine and Gujabu was slain. Meanwhile, Alwali had already left Zazzau for Burum-Burum which was led by his relative Wambai Tagwai when he learnt of Gaya's fall. The Fula soon assembled a heavy force led by Muhammad Bakatsine and launched a relentless attack on Burum-Burum.

== Death ==
Burum-Burum withstood the Fula onslaught for several weeks but eventually succumbed to the unabated assault. While the Sultans son Umaru escaped, Alwali died in the clash that ensued. His death signaled the end of the Kutumbawa and the fall of a dynasty that according to the Kano Chronicle trace their lineage to Bayajidda.

=== Aftermath ===
After the Sultan's death, and with no leader to rally behind, the rest of Kano submitted. Alwali's son Umaru fled towards Damagaram where he met the ousted Sultans of Katsina and Daura. The Sultan of Katsina would establish a kingdom in Maradi where his descendants use the title of "Sarkin Katsina" and that of Alwali use "Sarkin Kano". A descendant of the Sultan of Daura was reinstated as the Emir of Daura by the British in 1904.

After a few months, Dan Fodio appointed Suleiman Abahama, a modest young Imam as the first Fula Emir of Kano, subject to the Sokoto Caliphate. The Fula leaders of the Jihad soon assumed various titles.

Alkali Usman who led the initial Hausa supporters of the Jihad though receiving much respect did not gain much status or power. His faction were dubbed as "Hausawa".

Ciroma Dan Mama would receive his one hundred towns of mostly hamlets. Him and his hausa followers were dubbed as "Kutumbawa". Later on when the affairs of Kano became difficult to administer for the Fula kings, Ciroma Dan Mama helped acquaint them with the Hausa administrative system and practices.

The rest of the people of Kano were characterized by the pejorative term "Habe" by the new royal house and subject to grating conditions.

Hausa resistance would continue through erratic raids by Ningi which came under Muslim Hausa scholars led by Malam Hamza who opposed the discriminatory practices of the Fula emirs against the Habe, Maradi which became the new home of the deposed hausa aristocracy, and the Sultanate of Damagaram. The latter, under Ahmadu Kuran Daga gathered a formidable arsenal of thousands of locally manufactured canons and muskets and was on the verge of taking the Kano capital after sending the Emirs forces into retreat when an illness and news of a French invasion sent him racing back home but not before collecting a great haul of booty from Kano.

=== Yaji's sermon ===
"Yau Yaji, Gobe Yaji, Jibi Yaji, Gata Yaji, Bayan wannan, Oho?"

When Alwali's father, Yaji became Sultan, he made a cryptic statement which translates to "Today Yaji, tomorrow Yaji, the day after tomorrow Yaji, the Day after that Yaji, after that, Who knows?". This statement is believed to have foreshadowed the events that transpired after his death. Yaji's vision was to at least have his three sons ascend after him and enjoined the Ciroma to that purpose. Yaji ruled, and next after him was his son, and next after was another one of his sons and next after him was Alwali who was the last ruler under the House of Kutumbi.

== Biography in the Kano Chronicle ==
Below is a full biography of Muhammad Alwali II from Palmer's 1908 English translation of the Kano Chronicle.

The 43rd Sarki was Mohamma Alwali, son of Yaji. His mother’s name was Baiwa.

As soon as he became Sarki he collected stores of “Gero”(millet) and “Dawa”(sorghum) in case of war and famine. Nevertheless famine overtook him.

His chiefs said to him, “Sarkin Kano, why do you refuse to give cattle to Dirki?”

The Sarki said, “I cannot give you 40 cattle for Dirki.”

They said, “What prevents you? If any Sarkin Kano does not allow us cattle for Dirki, we fear that he will come to some ill.”

Alwali was very angry and sent young men to beat “Dirki” with axes until that which was inside the skins came out. They found a beautiful Koran inside Dirki.

Alwali said, “Is this Dirki?”

They said, ‘‘Who does not know Dirki? Behold here is Dirki.” Dirki is nothing but the Koran.

In Alwali’s time the Fulani conquered the 7 Hausa States on the plea of reviving the Muhammadan religion [Islam]. The Fulani attacked Alwali and drove him from Kano, whence he fled to Zaria.

The men of Zaria said, “Why have you left Kano?” He said, “The same cause which drove me out of Kano will probably drive you out of Zaria.”

He said, “I saw the truth with my eyes, I left because I was afraid of my life, not to save my wives and property.”

The men of Zaria drove him out with curses. So he fled to Kano, but the Fulani followed him to Burum-Burum and killed him there.

He ruled Kano 27 years, 3 of which were spent in fighting the Fulani.

— Kano Chronicle

== See also ==
- List of rulers of Kano

Preceded by Dauda Abasama II	Sarkin Kano; 1781-1807	Succeeded by Sulimanu
