= Dabon Dambazau =

Ist Fulani Sarkin Bai of Kano

Dabon Dambazau محمد يونس
- Sarkin Ban Kano
- Reign: 1819–1845
- Tenure: 26 years
- Predecessor: Haɓe Sarkin Bai
- Successor: Muhammad Kwairanga
- Full name: Muhammad Yunusa ibn Umar
- Native name: Dabo
- Other titles: Modibbo, Malam, Sheik.
- Born: Muhammad Yunusa; 1764; Damban Ngazargamu, Bornu Empire
- Died: 1845 (aged 80–81); Sarkin Bais palace, Dambazau
- Buried: 1845; Sarkin Bai's palace, Dambazau, Kano State.
- Residence: Dambazau Quarters Kano city
- Family: Dambazawa
- Spouses: Yagana bint Ali IV ibn Haj Hamdun; Fatsumatu bint Ibrahim Dabo
- Issue: Muhammad Kwairanga, Abuba, Zailani, Abdul Rahman, Musa, Isah, Umaru.
- Father: Modibbo Umaru
- Occupation: Islamic Scholar, Business Magnate, Warlord (Jihaadist) and Fief Administrator.

Notes
- Mazan Dambarwa (The Great struggler)

Muhammadu Yunusa, (Arabic: محمد يونس, romanized: Mohammed Yunoos; 1764 – 1845) popularly known as Dabon Dambazau, was a member of the Fulani Islamic revivalists group that waged Jihad on the Kingdom of Kano between 1804 and 1807. He was the first Fulani to hold the noble title of Sarkin Bai of Kano. Prior to his ascension, he was the clan leader of the Dambazawa Dayeɓe Fulani Clan, an accomplished Islamic scholar, and a prominent businessman. He was the fifth son of Malam Umaru, a Fulani businessman in the Borno Empire during the reign of Mai Ali IV ibn Haj Hamdun (1755-1793).

== Early life ==
Dabo was said to be born in the year 1764, when his father Modibbo Umaru and his Dambazawa Fulani clan were residents within the area of the Borno Empire's capital, Ngazargamu. Being the son of a scholar and businessman, he was introduced to Islamic knowledge and business at an early age. His search for Islamic knowledge reached its peak when a section of the Dambazawa clan under his leadership left Damban and settled in Kano. With the emergence of the renowned scholar Usman Dan Fodio in the 1790s, Dabo was said to have become his student, and during his stay with Dan Fodio, he became very close to Danfodio's younger brother, Abdullahi dan Fodio.

== Marriage ==
Dabon Dambazau's first wife was Yagana, a daughter of Borno's Mai Ali IV ibn Haj Hamdun (r. 1754–1794). He married her before he led a section of the Dambazawa away from Damban. Yagana gave birth to Muhammad Kwairanga (later Sarkin Ban Kano r. 1845–1886) and Abdulƙadir, widely called Zailani (the grandfather of the fourth sarkin Bai, Abdussalam, r. 1893–1907). Dabo's second wife was believed to be the daughter of Muhammad Bello, son of Usman dan Fodio, whom the Kano chronicles referred to as "yar Sakkwatawa" (the daughter of the people of Sokoto), her name was not recorded in history, but it is known that her marriage to Dabo did not last long because of the controversy it generated between Dabon Dambazau and the first Emir of Kano Suleman dan Abu hama (r 1809–1819). Dabo's third wife was Magajiyar Kano Fatsumatu, daughter of the 2nd Emir of Kano- Ibrahim Dabo. When Ibrahim Dabo became Emir, he appointed his first daughter Fatsumatu as the Magajiyar Kano and married her to Dabo. Fatsumatu remained childless up to Dabon Dambazau's death in 1845. Dabo may have had other wives and certainly concubines that bore him children, but these three were the only ones recorded in history.

== Dabon before the Jihad ==
It was not known exactly when Dabo left Damban, but he may have settled in Kano around the middle stage of King Alwali's reign, between 1786–1790. Dabo, after settling in Kano, was occupied only with business pursuits and Islamic scholarship, and he had no known contact with Kano royalty.

== Dabon during and after the Jihad ==
Dabo was already studying under Usman dan Fodio when the Jihad struggles started, and he was with the Shehu during his flight to Gudu and also was with him during the first battle of the jihad between the Shehu's Jama'a and the King of Gobir, Yunfa. After the battle, Dabo returned to Kano, and, together with leaders of other Fulani clans in Kano that included the following: Malam Jibir and Malam Abdul-rahman (Goshi) of the Yolawa clan, Malam Muhammad Bakatsine of the Joɓawa clan, Malam Danzabuwa of the Danejawa clan, Malam Jamo of the Sulluɓawa clan, and Malam Usman Bahaushe, waged war upon King Alwali and subsequently toppled him after a series of setbacks and successes between 1804 and 1807. After the successful defeat of King Alwali, Dabo entered Kano city with most of his kith and kin and occupied the official residence of the ousted Hausa Sarkin Dawakin Kano, located at the Marmara area of Kano city. But due to Dabo's large retinue and his keen interest in business, he later relocated to the official residence of the Hausa Sarkin Bai of Kano, since the house was spacious enough to accommodate all his retinue as well as because of its proximity to the Kano central market. This singular action (of moving into Sarkin Bai's official residence) prompted people to unofficially start referring to him as Sarkin Bai.

Emir of Kano Sulaimanu was appointed Emir of Kano between 1809–1810, and in the course of his rulership, he had misunderstandings with Dabon Dambazau, and, according to the Kano chronicles, Emir Sulemanu at one point imprisoned Dabo, and the Dambazawa went at night and forcefully broke him out. Later, due to threats to execute him by Emir Sulemanu, Dabo and Dambazau had to seek refuge and redress between him and Sulemanu in front of Shehu Usman. To this, Shehu Usman intervened and made peace between them. From there on, Dabo removed himself from Kano's administration and turned his affairs towards full time Islamic scholarship, business pursuits, and philanthropy.

Emir Sulemanu died in 1817. At the time of his death, several of the Fulani Clan leaders who had initiated the Jihad in Kano were still alive, including Dabon Dambazau, Malam Jibir of the Yolawa clan, and Malam Jamo of the Sulluɓawa clan. However, both Malam Jibir and Malam Jamo were very old and frail by then. Dabo, the youngest among the original Jihad leaders, some of whom even had sons his age, such as Malam Dikko, the son of Malam Muhammad Bakatsine, naturally emerged as a leading contender for the Emirship.

Despite this, Sultan Muhammad Bello overlook Dabon Dambazau in favour of Ibrahim Dabo of the Sulluɓawa Clan. One explanation holds that the Sultan acted based on a letter written by Emir Sulemanu on his deathbed, recommending Ibrahim Dabo, his personal assistant and Galadima, as his successor. In that letter, Sulemanu praised Ibrahim Dabo’s virtues while accusing Dabon Dambazau of haughtiness and Malam Dikko of the Joɓawa clan of having oppressive tendencies should either be appointed Emir.

Although the letter may indeed have influenced the Sultan’s decision, another possible reason is that appointing Dabon Dambazau would have strengthened the position of the Gwandu section of the Sultanate, headed by Abdullahi dan Fodio, to whom Dabo was closely connected. Because Kano was the most populous and wealthiest emirate in the Caliphate, placing it under the influence of the Sultan’s uncle would have weakened Sokoto’s authority. Politically, it was more advantageous for the Sultan to pass the Emirship to a neutral or “free” client such as Ibrahim Dabo.

Emir Ibrahim Dabo’s appointment was met with widespread revolt throughout the Kano Emirate. Unlike Emir Sulemanu, Ibrahim Dabo chose not to enter into conflict with the remaining leaders of the Jihad. Instead, he sought reconciliation by offering each of them a daughter in marriage and granting them large fiefdoms. To Dabon Dambazau, he offered the administration of the vast northern region of Kano, stretching from Ungogo to Danbatta. To formalize their new relationship, he also married his first daughter, Fatsumatu, to Dabon Dambazau.

Dabon Dambazau accepted both the marriage and the appointment, formally assuming the title of Sarkin Bai and becoming the fiefholder of Northern Kano. Together, Emir Ibrahim Dabo and the surviving Jihad leaders set out to suppress the revolts and successfully restored stability across the emirate.

The prolific writer M. G. Smith noted that Dabo adopted a different approach from his predecessor. In officially appointing Dabon Dambazau as Sarkin Bai, Ibrahim Dabo placed him in charge of all territories between Ungogo, three or four miles north of the city, and Kun-ci near Kano’s northwestern boundary. He also restored Dambatta and Kunya to Dambazau, lands previously seized by Emir Sulemanu, a move that set Dambazau and Dan Tunku in opposition to each other. To further consolidate the new arrangement, Ibrahim Dabo appointed his daughter, Fatsimatu Zara, as Magajiya- traditionally the title for the eldest daughter of a reigning Emir- making her the first Fulani Magajiya in Kano. He then gave her to Dabon Dambazau as a bride, along with Kunci as her dowry, publicly signaling complete reconciliation between them.

Throughout his life, Dabon Dambazau maintained an active involvement in commerce. His engagement in religious scholarship, participation in the Jihad, and subsequent fief administration did not diminish his commitment to business, and he remained the wealthiest Fulani clan leader in Kano until his death.

Dabo was regarded as resilient and industrious, managing simultaneously his scholarly pursuits, commercial activities, and the administration of nearly one-third of the Kano Emirate. His ability to balance these responsibilities contributed to his prominence within the region.
