= Dauda Abasama II =

- Sarkin Kano
- Reign: 1776-1781
- Predecessor: Babba Zaki
- Successor: Muhammad Alwali
- House: Bagauda Dynasty
- Father: Yaji II
- Mother: Baiwa

Dauda Abasama II was a Sultan of Kano who reigned from 1776 to 1781.

== Biography in the Kano Chronicle ==
Below is a biography of Dauda Abasama II from Palmer's 1908 English translation of the Kano Chronicle.

The 42nd Sarki was Dauda Abasama, the son of Yaji. His mother’s name was Baiwa.

He was a Sarki of good character, reticent and wise, generous and popular. He was prudent and at the same time warlike, and kept his word. He had a mind above favouritism or revenge, and took the Galadima Makarna’s advice in everything. The Galadima Makama was like a Sarki, while Dauda was like his Wazir, because he was so forbearing. There was no war in his reign or rebellion.

He ruled Kano 5 years and 4 months.

— Kano Chronicle

Preceded by Babba Zaki	Sarkin Kano; 1776-1781	Succeeded by Muhammad Alwali
