= Yusuf Magaji Bichi =

Nigerian security personnel (born 1956)

Yusuf Magaji Bichi CFR fwc
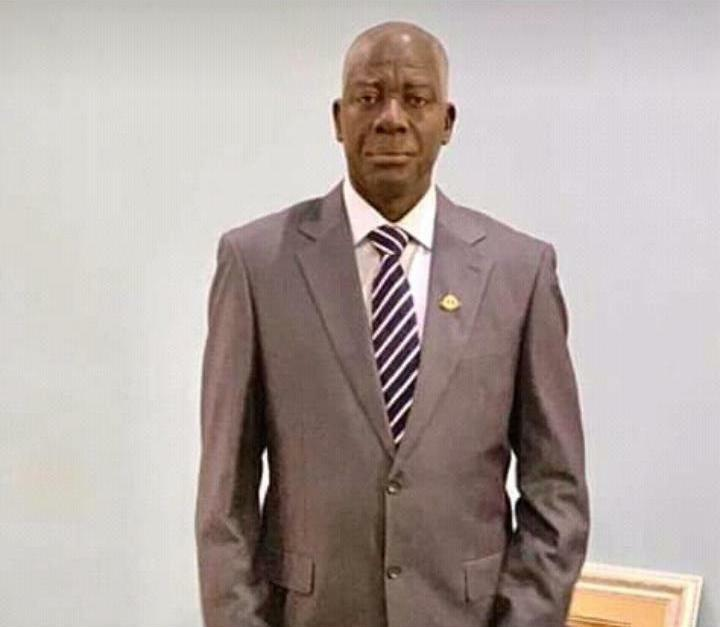

Director-General of the State Security Service
- In office 14 September 2018 – 26 August 2024
- President: Muhammadu Buhari; Bola Tinubu
- Preceded by: Matthew Seiyefa
- Succeeded by: Adeola Ajayi

Personal details
- Born: 23 February 1956 (age 70) Bichi, Northern Region, British Nigeria (now Bichi, Nigeria)
- Education: Ahmadu Bello University

Yusuf Magaji Bichi CFR fwc (born 23 February 1956) is a Nigerian security personnel who served as the director-general of the State Security Service from 2018 to 2024.

== Background and education ==
Bichi was born on 23 February 1956 in Hagagawa Qtrs of Bichi Local Government, Kano State. Bichi attended Kano State College of Advanced Studies (1975–1977) and Ahmadu Bello University, Zaria (1977–1980), where he graduated with a degree in political science. He attended strategic training at the National Defence College, Abuja where he obtained a certificate with an authorization to use the title, Fellow War College (FWC).

== Career in the Security Services ==
Bichi began his career in the Security Division of the Cabinet Office in Kano State from 1981 to 1984, in 1984 he joined the defunct Nigerian Security Organization (NSO), the precursor of the present State Security Service, now renamed Department of State Services, where he rose to the rank of director. He served as state director of security in Jigawa State (1998–1999), Niger State (2000–2003), Sokoto State (2003–2005) and Abia State (2005–2006). Subsequently, he served as director in the National Assembly Liaison (2006), Directorate of Security Enforcement (2007–2008), Directorate of Operations (2008–2009), Directorate of Intelligence (2009–2010), State Service Academy, Lagos (2010–2013), SSS Research Development Centre, Bauchi (2013–2014), Directorate of Inspection (2014–2015), Directorate of Administration and Finance (2015–2017).

== Director General of the State Security Service ==
He was appointed by President Muhammadu Buhari on 14 September 2018, replacing Matthew Seiyefa. Bichi was replaced with Adeola Ajayi by President Bola Tinubu on 26 August 2024.

== Awards ==
After the 2019 presidential election, an election monitoring group known as the International Human Rights Commission, Geneva, Switzerland, honored Bichi, with an award. According to the group, "the award was in recognition of the exemplary performance by the Service and its personnel during the just concluded 2019 general elections."

On 11 October 2022, he was conferred with the National Honour of Commander of the Order of the Federal Republic (CFR) by President Muhammadu Buhari, GCFR. The honour is in recognition of his sterling leadership qualities and particularly for his tremendous contributions to the national security management of the country.
