= Babban Zaki =

Babba Zaki
- Sarkin Kano
- Reign: 1768-1776
- Predecessor: Yaji II
- Successor: Dauda Abasama II
- House: Bagauda Dynasty
- Father: Yaji II
- Mother: Yerduna

Babban Zaki also known as Jan Rano was a Sultan of Kano who reigned from 1768 to 1776. One of the most significant rulers of the House of Kutumbi, he solved the puzzle of Kano's complex structure and provided the blueprint for its successful administration which would survive even after the fall of the Kutumbawa. Through the utilization of force and espionage, he created order out of chaos by pitting government officials against each other and disrupting communication channels between chiefs in the State to avoid organized revolts. He was also the first King to arm the Kano royal guard with muskets.

== Reign ==
He was the Eldest son of Yaji II's three infamous sons. His mother's name was yerduna. The Kano chronicle omits his birth name, his ephitet Babban Zaki, means "Great Lion". He was also praised as "Jan Rano, Gasa Giwa", which translates to "The three pronged fork who roasts elephants" in attribution to his mastery over the chiefs of Kano.

While the Kutumbawa's reign was characterized by the dispersion of power among State officials, in Babban Zaki's reign, he crippled the influence of his officials to avoid rebellions which became common in the reign of his predecessors. He emphatically crushed two of such rebellions against Birnin Auyau and against Burum Burum.

He was said to pillage his own chiefs and to coerce them into fight wars using his strategies against their will. He further cut off communication channels between them and ensured communication lines directly led to him through his slaves. In his time, no one was allowed to see him, not even his family, except through his slaves and in times of war, he rarely took to the battlefield himself. He also instituted state sponsored espionage. Amongst his most trusted men, he was able to maintain a balance in their treatment such that each one thought himself to be the Sultan's favorite.

== Biography in the Kano Chronicle ==
Below is a biography of Babba Zaki from Palmer's 1908 English translation of the Kano Chronicle.

The 41st Sarki was the son of Yaji, called Babba Zaki. His mother’s name was Yerduna. He was an able Sarki, of great strength, renowned for his memory and eloquence. He was called Babba Zaki.

He made war on Birnin Auyau in the time of Sarki Abubakr. If it had not been for Madawaki Kano Dandawa, Sarkin Gaiya Gajigi and Sarkin Jafun Furtumi, the Kanawa would have entered the city of Auyau and destroyed the town. Yaji built a house at Takai and almost lived there, but the court refused to live there. He made war on Burumburum, and took the town by assault, capturing many of the inhabitants and cutting the throats of some, whilst the others fled. He curbed the power of the Sarkis and head slaves and plundered them every day. He forced them to give presents under compulsion, and to go to war unwillingly. Hence he was called “Jan Rano, well named the disturber of elephants.” In war he forced them to fight against their judgment. He was the first Sarki who had a guard of musketeers at Kano, a practice which has obtained ever since. He imitated the Arabs of Kano in almost everything.

His war captains were 5—Sarkin Sankara Nagerki, Sarkin Bebeji Dembo, Sarkin Majia Kimfirmi Makama Bobawa, Sarkin Jarumai Achukur, Sarkin Dawaki Maina.

The great men in his time were 42: Dawaki Tokara, Bawa, Madawaki Dundurusu, Lifidi Gabjin, Galadiman Shamaki Alwali, Tunku, Yakufu, Berka Wuta, Bagarami, Berka. These were all slaves.

Among the mallams were: Alkali Abbas, Alkali Makam, Limanin Kano Aburauf and his sons, Abubukr Dan Mallam Bohari from Yandoto, and Husaini from Tarkai.

The great men among the Arabs were: Sherif Hassan, Hajariki, Sherif Hamad, Sherif Dahab, and others.

Among the Sarki’s sons were: Dan Iya, Mallam Osnman, Choka, Daka and Nafata.

Among his eunuchs were: Sarkin Dawaki Muradi, Turaki Mainya Munaga Allah, Turaki Kuka Kasan Allah, Turaki Kuka Ka-nem-Kiwo, Gwoninka Jephar, who was of the same people as Sherif Hassan and others. The chief of these were Dan Maji Babba, Hangaza and Dan Zanko Jibril. In all there were 42.

Each of them thought he was greater than the rest in the Sarki’s eyes. Thus the Sarki planned.

Babban Zaki ruled Kano 8 years.

— Kano Chronicle

Preceded by Yaji II	Sarkin Kano; 1768-1776	Succeeded by Dauda Abasama II
