= Sani Daura =

Nigerian politician

Sani Zangon Daura

Federal Minister of Agriculture and Rural Development
- In office May 29, 1999 – 2000
- Preceded by: Alhaji Alfa Wali
- Succeeded by: Hassan Adamu

Federal Minister of Environment
- In office 2000 – 30 January 2001
- Preceded by: Hassan Adamu
- Succeeded by: Mohammed Kabir Said

Personal details
- Born: Katsina State, Nigeria

Sani Zangon Daura was Nigerian Minister of Agriculture and Rural Development and later Minister of Environment, in the cabinet of President Olusegun Obasanjo. He was dropped from Obasanjo's cabinet in a reshuffle on 30 January 2001.

== Background ==
Sani Zangon Daura was born in 1938 in Zangon Daura, Katsina State, Nigeria. He graduated from the School for Arabic Studies in Kano. He was given a scholarship to attend the School for African and Oriental Studies, London, in 1961, but returned to Nigeria before completing the course and was admitted into the University of Lagos. During Nigerian Second Republic in 1979, he was a candidate of the National Party of Nigeria (NPN) primaries to run for governor of Kaduna state, but lost to Alhaji Lawal Kaita. Kaita in turn, lost the election to the People's Redemption Party (PRP) candidate, Alhaji Abdulkadir Balarabe Musa.

== Cabinet positions ==
Appointed Minister of Agriculture in June 1999, Daura laid out a policy for the sector, which accounted at that time, for 38% of the Nigerian GDP. Elements included increasing production and productivity, agro-technology improvement, poverty alleviation, agro-industry development, export promotion and environmental protection.

In November 2000, he was the Nigerian delegate to the UN Framework Convention on Climate Change, held in the Netherlands. Daura was chairman of the Group of 77 (G77), a bloc of 133 developing nations and China. In a major speech at the meeting, he warned that poorer countries would not limit their greenhouse gas emissions unless rich countries lived up to their own promises under the Kyoto Protocol. Daura said that the US had caused a "plague of climate change" as harmful as the colonization of Africa. The summit failed to achieve any results.

== Later career ==
Daura became a member of the Board of Trustees of the Arewa Consultative Forum (ACF), an influential Northern lobby group. In March 2006, he was among ACF leaders, who strongly opposed to allowing president Obasanjo to run for a third term in 2007. In December 2008, Daura received the Commander of the Order of the Niger (CON) award.
