= Kabiru Muhammad Inuwa =

Emir of Rano (born 1965)

- former Emir of Rano
- Predecessor: Alhaji Tafida Abubakar Ila Auta Bawo
- Born: 1965 (age 60–61); Rano, Kano, Nigeria
- Father: Mohammad Inuwa

Kabiru Muhammad Inuwa (born 1965) was the 2nd Emir of Rano after the death of Alhaji Tafida Abubakar Ila Auta Bawo. Before being appointed as emir of Rano, he served in the Nigerian Immigration Service (NIS) and led traditional responsibilities where he served as Kaigaman Rano and District Head of Kibiya.

Rano Emirate was one of the newly created emirates in Kano State by Governor Abdullahi Umar Ganduje which was headed by Alhaji Tafida Abubakar Ila as the 1st Emir and preceded by Kabiru Mohammad Inuwa.

Following the re-establishment of Kano Emirate in 2024, Kabiru was deposed as Emir of Rano and Rano Emirate was dissolved. In July 2024, Rano was re-established as a second-class Emirate under the auspices of Kano Emirate. Kabiru, however, was replaced as emir by Alhaji Muhammad Isa Umar.
