= Adeola Ajayi =

Nigerian intelligence officer

Oluwatosin Adeola Ajayi

Director-General of the State Security Service
- Incumbent
- Assumed office August 26, 2024
- President: Bola Tinubu
- Vice President: Kashim Shettima
- Preceded by: Yusuf Magaji Bichi

Personal details
- Born: April 30, 1968 [Idowa, Ijebu], [Ogun State][Nigeria]
- Profession: Career intelligence officer

Oluwatosin Adeola Ajayi is a Nigerian intelligence officer who has been the Director-General of the Department of Security Service since August 2024.

== Biography ==
Oluwatosin Adeola Ajayi joined the Nigerian intelligence community in the 1990s as a cadet officer, his training being unique, as Ajayi received knowledge in "areas of management, security leadership, critical thinking, and human resources".

It has been said [by Former DSS Director Mike Ejiofor] that Ajayi has vast experience and knowledge when it comes to the Niger Delta (in relation to crude oil theft and Ajayi's tenure as "State Director of Security" in Rivers, Bayelsa, Bauchi, Enugu and Kogi State), as well as being the youngest Director to date, saying, "I [Ejiofor] think he [Ajayi] will come in with vibrant ideas and new ideas, and for those of us who are the old school, we will be in the background also trying to give him that support to see that he succeeds". Ajayi has also been described as a humanitarian who assists the "less privileged" members of society, in particular Chairman of the Mbaitoli, LGA Hon Ifunanya Nwanegwo praised him for empowering at least 10 different individuals in their respective small businesses.

=== Tenure as DG of DSS/SSS ===
Ajayi's confirmation as DG of the DSS on August 28, 2024, was met with an ecstatic response by DSS personnel, for the organization had a reputation of having personnel that were a "brutish band of goons", with the alleged claim that former DG Yusuf Magaji Bichi had a tendency of "bearing down on his subordinates"; however, the origins of this specific claim would amount to hearsay.

Notable is that Ajayi saw it pertinent to instill unity amongst the higher ranks of the Nigerian government, as Ajayi presented a notable lecture in the Alumni Association of the National Institute for Security Studies titled "Mobilising Stakeholders to Curb Insecurity in Nigeria: A Practical Approach," which had brought Nigerian security experts, policymakers, and community leaders to "discuss collaborative strategies", in combating the prevailing crime that Nigeria was and is facing.

=== Media Freedom ===
In a letter to the International Press Institute Ajayi expressed willingness to "champion fair treatment of journalists and create a conducive atmosphere for them to carry out their legitimate duties, in line with the drive of President Bola Ahmed Tinubu, GCFR, to protect all Nigerians, (Note: Nigerian citizenry as defined in the Nigerian constitution.) irrespective of tribe, religion, or profession”, further expanding "I [Ajayi] have initiated further engagements with my colleagues and heads of other security agencies to prioritise the protection and fair treatment of members of the press across the country". On December 2, 2025, Ajayi was awarded the "Press Freedom award", for "demonstrating an unmistakable commitment to press freedom and respect for journalists and media organisations", President Tinubu commended Ajayi by presenting this as a good example for other officials "[President] Tinubu encourages other security agencies and officials to emulate the DSS example and engage the media as partners, not adversaries", this exemplary service was taken note of especially by the Nigerian Police Force, In April 2026, the Broadcasting Organization of Nigeria (BON) honoured Mr. Ajayi with a Friend of the Media award. The organization said Mr. Ajayi was one of the special awardees, describing him as a thoroughbred professional who, since his appointment by President Tinubu, has displayed utmost respect for the media. Similarly, in June 2026, the Nigerian Union of Journalists (NUJ), honoured Mr. Ajayi with its "Man of the Year award for his leadership in strengthening collaboration between security agencies and the media" contextually the DSS/SSS had a reputation of "serial harassment, intimidation, and arrests of journalists", which Ajayi sought to "change".

== Awards ==
=== International awards ===
- December 2, 2025 Press Freedom award by the Nigerian National Committee of the International Press Institute
