= Bayajidda =

Legendary founder of the Hausa states

Bayajidda // (Hausa with tone markings: Bàyā̀jiddà) (real name: Abu Yazid) was, according to the legends surrounding most West African states before the 19th century, the founder of the Hausa states.

Most accounts say that Bayajidda came from Baghdad. Bayajidda came first to Borno where he was given one of the Mai's daughters as a wife, and then later lived for a while in Hausa land where he married Daurama Shawata, the Queen of Daura, who also gave him a Gwari mistress as a reward for slaying "Sarki", said to be a great snake which deprived her people of access to water. By the Queen of Daura, Bayajidda had a son called Bawo, another called Biram by the Borno princess, and yet another son, Karbagari, by his Gwari paramour. Bawo is said to have succeeded his father and had six sons who became the rulers of Daura, Katsina, Zazzau, Gobir, Kano and Rano. These, together with Biram, which was ruled by the son of Bayajidda and of the Borno Princess, formed the "Hausa Bakwai" or the "Hausa 7". However, Karbagari the son of the Gwari mistress had seven sons too who ruled Kebbi, Zamfara, Gwari, Jukun, Ilorin, Nupe and Yauri which are referred to in this tradition as the "Banza Bakwai" or "Vain 7"

== His hero's legend ==
=== The hero's departure from Baghdad and his stay in Borno ===
According to the legend, Bayajidda was a prince from Baghdad (the capital of modern-day Iraq) and son of King Abdullahi, but he was exiled from his home town after Queen Zidam, also known as Zigawa, had conquered the city. Once he left Baghdad, he traveled across Africa with numerous warriors and arrived in Borno.

Once in Borno, tales differ as to what caused tension with the local king. According to one story, Bayajidda realized his forces were stronger than those of the king; because of this, he planned to overthrow him. However, the king heard of the plot and, after consulting with his advisors, gave Bayajidda his daughter, Magaram (also known as Magira), in marriage. Later, when the king attacked and took over several towns, he tricked his new son-in-law into leaving his own men to guard the towns, thereby decreasing the number of men Bayajidda had at his disposal. Bayajidda realized that he was being tricked when he had only his wife and one slave left; during the night, they fled to Garun Gabas, now situated in the Hadeja region. While there, Magaram gave birth to Bayajidda's first child, Biram, the eponymous ancestor of the petty kingdom of Gabas-ta-Biram ("east of Biram").

However, according to another version of the story, Bayajidda was welcomed into Borno, married Magaram and became popular among the people. Because of this, the king envied him and plotted against him; upon being informed of this by his wife, he fled Borno with her.

=== Arrival in Daura and slaying of the serpent ===
Bayajidda left his wife and child in Garun Gabas and continued on to the village of Gaya near Kano - which others believe to be Gaya in modern Niger -, where he had the local blacksmiths make him a knife. He then came to the town of Daura (located in modern-day Katsina State), where he entered a house and asked an old woman for water. She informed him that a serpent named Sarki (sarki is the Hausa word for king) guarded the well and that the people were only allowed to draw water once a week. Bayajidda set out for the well and killed the serpent with the sword and beheaded it with the knife the blacksmiths had made for him, after which he drank the water, put the head in a bag, and returned to the old woman's house. (The Kusugu Well where this is said to have happened is nowadays a tourist attraction.)

The next day, the people of Daura gathered at the well, wondering who had killed the snake; Magajiya Daurama, the local queen, offered sovereignty over half the town to whoever could prove that he killed the snake. Several men brought snake heads forth, but the heads did not match the body. The old woman, owner of the house Bayajidda was staying in, informed the queen that her guest had slayed it, after which Daurama summoned Bayajidda. Having presented the snake's head, proving to her that he was the one who had slain Sarki, he turned down the offer of half the town, instead requesting her hand in marriage; she married him out of gratitude for slaying the serpent.

=== Relationship with Magajiya Daurama ===
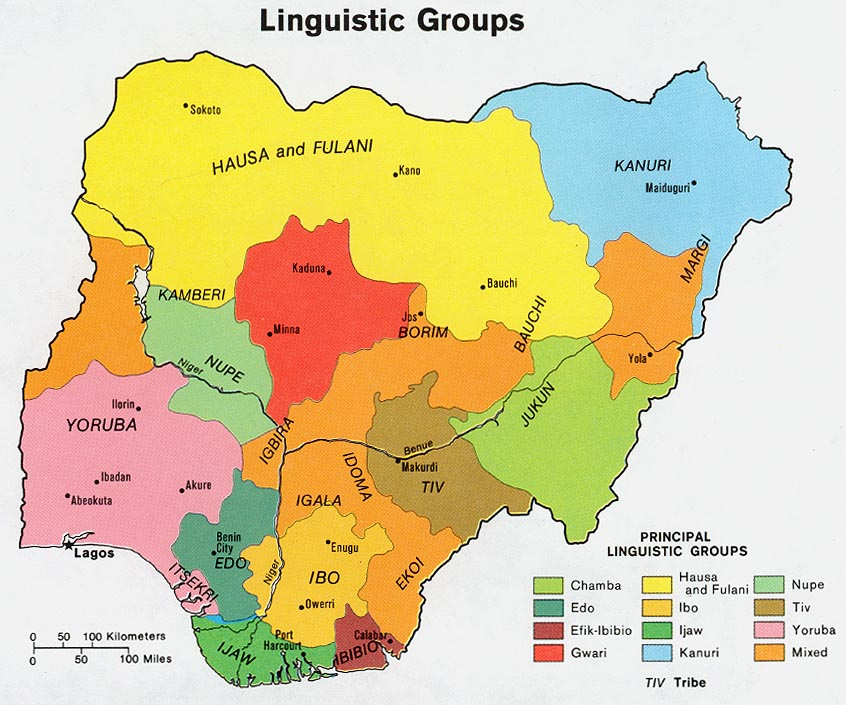
Map of Nigeria's main linguistic groups, as of 1979 (Hausa and Fulani are in yellow).
The location of Daura is indicated by a red dot.

Because it was against the custom of the people of Daura for their queens to marry, Daurama made a compromise with Bayajidda and said she would only have sexual intercourse with him later; because of this, she gave him a concubine named Bagwariya. (According to the oral palace version of the legend, Daurama gave him Bagwariya because she wanted to break her "queenly vow to remain a virgin," but had to undergo rituals to do so.)

Bagwariya had a son fathered by Bayajidda and she named him Karap da Gari, or Karbagari which means "he snatched the town" in Hausa. This worried Daurama, and when she had a son of her own (also fathered by Bayajidda), she named him Bawo which means "give it back".

=== Two groups of descendants ===
Throughout his life, Bayajidda is said to have fathered three children with three different women. Bawo fathered six of his own sons, whose names were Daura, Gobir, Kano, Katsina, Rano, and Zazzau. Together with Biram, the son of Magaram, these seven went on to rule the seven "legitimate" Hausa states, the Hausa Bakwai. (Some versions of the tale leave Bawo and Magaram out entirely, with Biram, Daura, Gobir, Kano, Katsina, Rano, and Zaria being the sons of Bayajidda and Daurama). Karbagari's descendants, meanwhile, founded the seven "illegitimate" states, the Banza Bakwai. The Hausa kingdom began as seven states founded by the Bayajidda legend and the six sons of Bawo and himself, in addition to the hero's son Ibrahim of an earlier marriage.

== Social context ==
=== Social embeddedness of the legend ===
The different figures of the Bayajidda narrative were embodied by precise officials of the former Daura kingdom: the king represented Bayajidda, the official queen mother Magajiya Daurama and the official royal sister Bagwariya.

=== Re-enactment during the Gani/Mawlūd festival ===
Formerly the celebrations of the Mawlūd or Gani festival consisted in the re-enactements of the major details of the legend: departure from Iraq, slaying of the snake in the well and marriage between the hero and the queen. The royal sword and the knife are still believed to have been those ones used for the slaying of the snake and the cutting of its head.

=== Repercussions on other regional traditions ===
The Bayajidda legend is widely known at the courts of the "Seven Hausa" kings where it is considered to correspond to the oldest known history of Hausaland. As already observed by the traveller Heinrich Barth the basic division between the Seven Hausa and the Seven Banza is used among the Songhay to distinguish between the northern hausa and the southern gurma side of the River Niger.

== Historical meaning ==
There are a variety of views on the Bayajidda story, with differing opinions on the meaning and historicity of the tale. Some scholars suppose that Bayajidda is a historical person, the founder of the Seven Hausa states, and contemporary Hausa royals - especially those in Daura and Zaria (Zazzau) - trace their lineage to and draw their authority from him (see Kano Chronicle). By contrast, others claim that Bayajidda never existed.

=== Medieval history ===
W. K. R. Hallam argues that Bayajidda represents a "folk personification" of the supporters of Abu Yazid (a tenth-century Kharijite Berber rebel), whose followers fled southwards from North Africa after Yazid's defeat by and death at the hands of Fatimids. According to this theory, the Hausa states would have been founded by Kharijite refugees in the tenth century CE. Elizabeth Isichei, in her work A History of African Societies to 1870, suggests that Bayajidda's stay in Borno prior to arriving in Hausaland is "perhaps a folk memory of origins on the Borno borderland, or a reflection of Borno political and cultural dominance."

=== Symbolical history ===
One view is that the story of the marriage of Bayajidda and Daurama symbolizes the merger of Arab and Berber tribes in North and West Africa.

Biblical Anthropologist, Alice C. Linsley, maintains that Bayajidda's closest biblical counterpart is Cain . Cain is said to have fled from his father, married a princess whom he met at a well, and was involved with metalworkers. Most of the heroes of Genesis met their wives at sacred wells or springs. Abraham married Keturah at the Well of Sheba (Beersheva). Issac (Yitzak) found a wife at a well in Aram. Moses encountered his wife at a well sacred to the Midianites and won her hand after he delivered the women and flocks from Egyptian raiders.

In his 1989 book An Imperial Twilight, Gawain Bell suggests that the marriage of Bayajidda and Daurama signals a "change from a matriarchal to a patriarchal system."

== In literature and media ==
Bayajidda's story inspired a comic book adaptation titled "Bayajidda: An African Legend" adapted/written by Claude Opara and drawn by Ibrahim Yakubu under the 'An African Legend' comic series. The comic was published in 2018 using the popular bande dessinee style. A French translation was later released the following year.

== Bibliography ==
- Barth, Heinrich (1857–1859). Travel and Discoveries in North and Central Africa. Vol. 1–3. New York: Harper and Brothers. OCLC 1298561489.
- Hallam, W. K. R. (1966). "The Bayajida Legend in Hausa Folklore". The Journal of African History. 7 (1): 47–60. doi:10.1017/S002185370000606X. JSTOR 179458. S2CID 162668066.
- Hogben, S. J. and; Kirk-Greene, Anthony (1966). The Emirates of Northern Nigeria: A Preliminary Survey of Their Historical Traditions. London: Oxford University Press. p. 145-155.
- Lange, Dierk (2012). "The Bayajidda legend and Hausa history" (PDF). In Bruder, Edith; Parfitt, Tudor (eds.). Studies in Black Judaism. Cambridge Scholars Publishing. pp. 138–174.
- Nicolas, Guy (1975). Dynamique sociale et appréhension du monde au sein d'une société hausa (in French). Paris: Institut d'ethnologie.
- Palmer, Herbert R. (1928). "Bayajidda-Legende". Sudanese Memoirs. Vol. 3. Lagos. pp. 132–146.
- Smith, Michael (1978). The Affairs of Daura. Berkeley: University of California Press. ISBN 9780520025028.
