= Yusuf Bala Usman College of Legal and General Studies =

Coordinates: 12.98156°N 7.62227°E

- Type: Public
- Established: 1928
- Location: Daura, Katsina State, Nigeria
- Website: Official website

The Yusuf Bala Usman College of Legal and General Studies is a state government higher education institution located in Daura, Katsina State, Nigeria.

== History ==
The Yusuf Bala Usman College of Legal and General Studies was established in 1928.

== Courses ==
The institution offers the following courses;

- Hausa
- English
- Computer Science Education
- Arabic
