= Daurama =

Kabaras of Daura (fl. 9th century)

Daurama II

Kabaras of Daura
- Reign: c. 9th century
- Predecessors: Kabara Hamata
- Successor: office dissolved
- Born: Tsohon Birni, Katsina, Northern Nigeria
- Died: Daura, Northern Nigeria
- Burial: Birni Ta Kusheyi
- House: Kabara Banu Habe
- Mother: Hamata
- Religion: Hausa animist

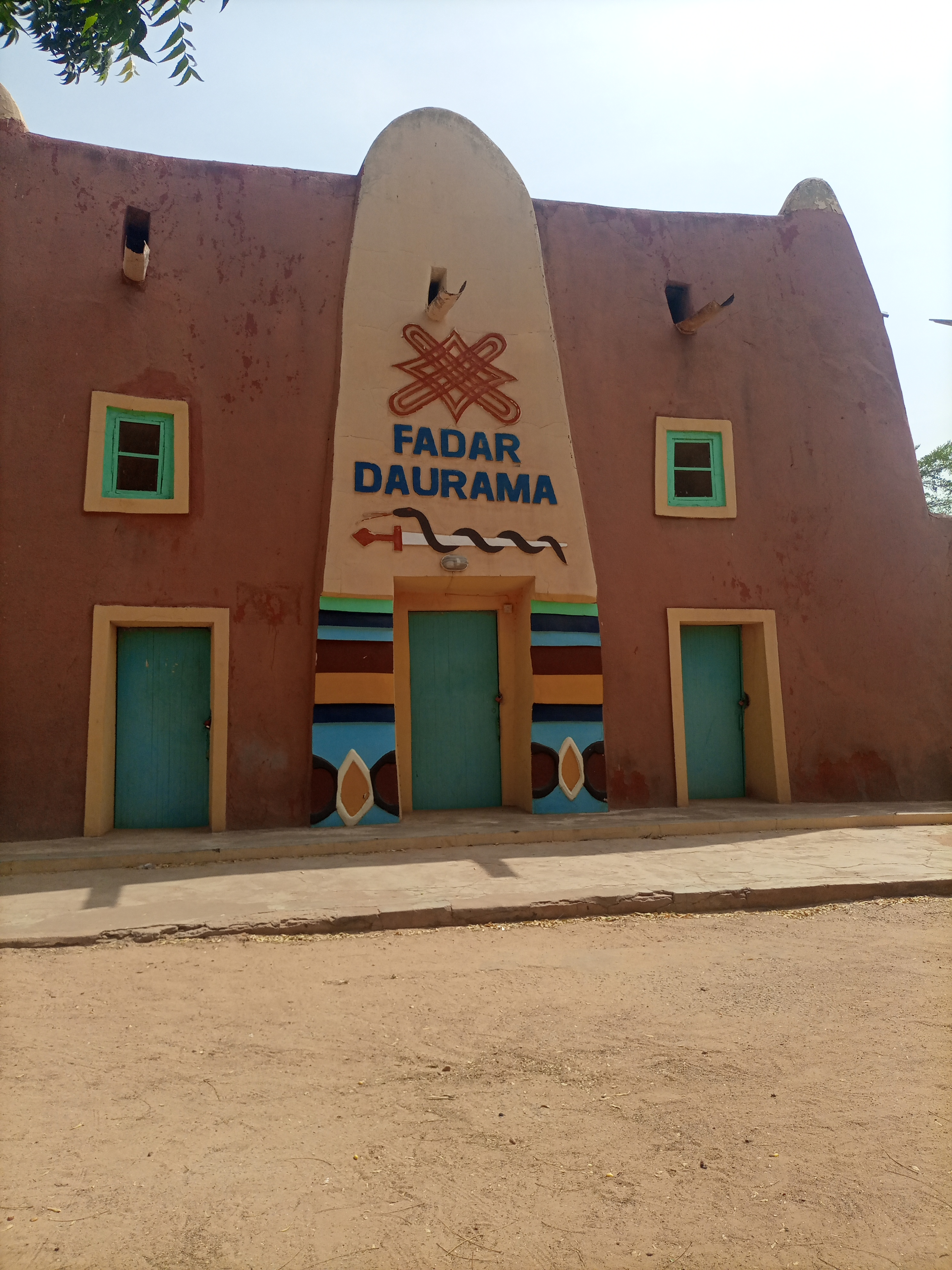
Daurama Palace.

Daurama or Magajiya Daurama (fl. 9th century) was a ruler of the Hausa people who, as the last Kabara of Daura, presided over the upheaval that saw a transference of power from the matriarchal royal system. Oral traditions remember her as the founding "queen grandmother" of the Hausa Empire started in the area known today as the monarchies of northern Niger and Nigeria. The story of Magajiya Daurama is partially told in the legend of Bayajidda.

Magajiya Daurama ruled a state known as Daura, after the town with the same name, today also an emirate in Katsina State, Nigeria. The original capital of the state was called Tsohon Birni ("Old Town"); and during her reign Daurama moved the capital to the town of Daura, which was named after her.
