= Kusugu =

Water-well and tourist attraction in Nigeria

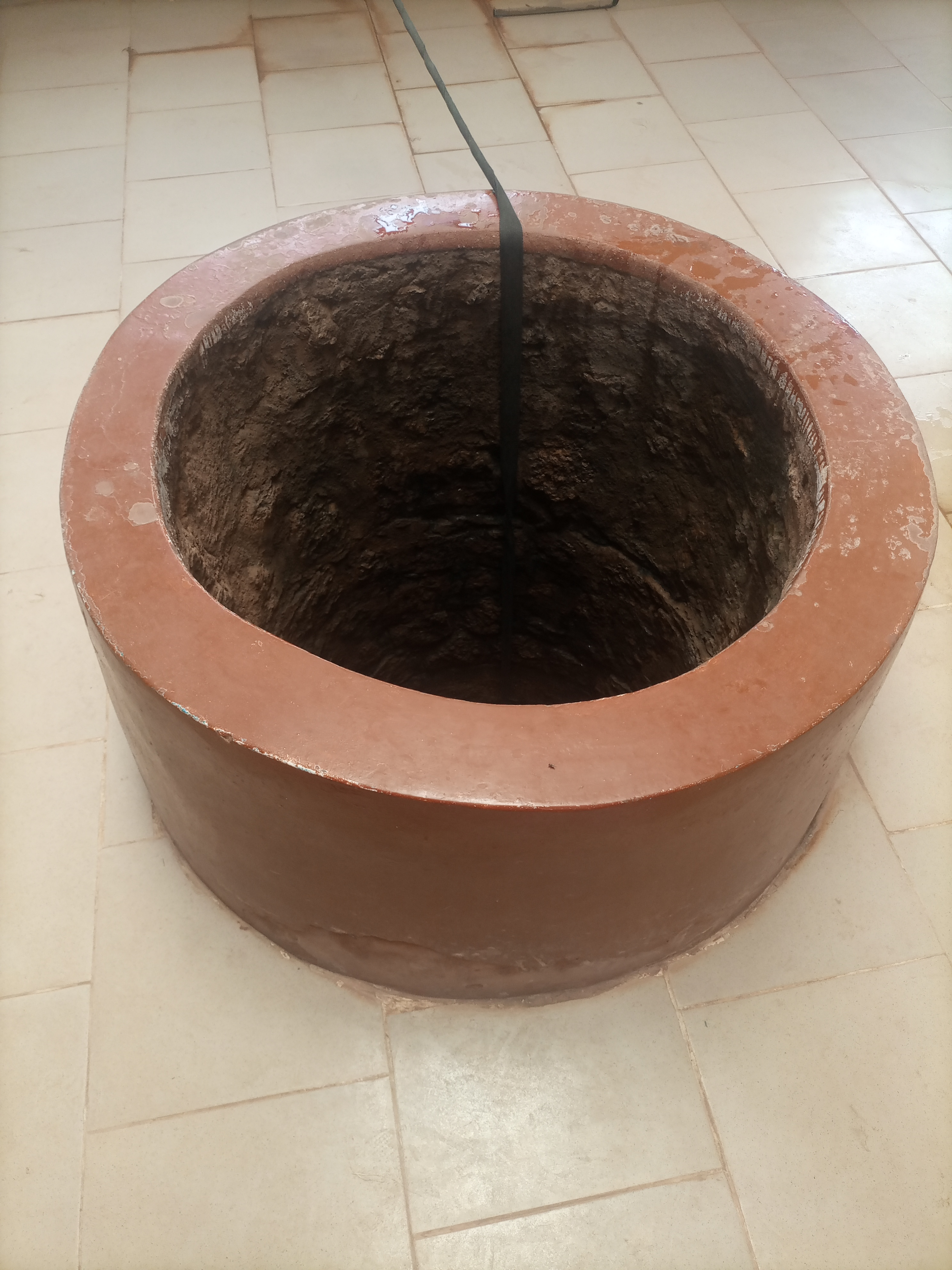
Kusugu Well

The Kusugu well is an ancient well located in Daura, Nigeria. The well is famous for its relation to the legend of the hero Bayajidda defeating the snake Sarki. The well and Bayajidda's supposed dagger are now a tourist attraction.

== The legend ==
According to Hausa myth, Hausa communities have been living in Central Sudan (much of modern-day Northern Nigeria & some part of Niger) for over 2000 years. Daura was believed to be one of the largest Hausa cities of that time. It had queens as head of government that oversee the affairs of the people. During the reign of Queen Daurama, the major source of water for Daura was the Kusugu well. But people were only allowed to fetch water on Fridays because of a strange snake that lives inside the well.

That was how people continue to starve until one day when a person who was believed to be a Baghdadi prince, Bayajidda (Abu Yazid) came to Daura because he could not get the throne after the death of his father. The brave Prince after lodging in the house of one old woman in the name of Ayyana, requested for water, but he was not given enough. He then requested to be shown the well to fetch water. He was warned about a strange snake. He went to the well and eventually killed the snake after a fight. The queen then married him and he became a King. Because he could not speak Hausa before, people started calling him Bayajidda, meaning, he didn’t understand before.

He had seven children that ruled over the seven Hausa states that are called Hausa Bakwai. The Kusugu well is where the giant snake Sarki was killed by Bayajida in the 10th century because the snake would only allow the people of Daura to fetch water from the well only once a week, mainly Fridays.

=== Arrival of Bayajidda in Daura and slaying of the serpent ===
Bayajidda left his wife and child in Garun Gabas and continued on to the village of Gaya near Kano - which others believe to be Gaya in modern Niger -, where he had the local blacksmiths make him a knife. He then came to the town of Daura (located in modern-day Katsina State), where he entered a house and asked an old woman for water. She informed him that a serpent named Sarki (sarki is the Hausa word for king) guarded the well and that the people were only allowed to draw water once a week. Bayajidda set out for the well and killed the serpent with the sword and beheaded it with the knife the blacksmiths had made for him, after which he drank the water, put the head in a bag, and returned to the old woman's house. (The well where this is said to have happened is nowadays a tourist attraction.)

The next day, the people of Daura gathered at the well, wondering who had killed the snake; Magajiya Daurama, the local queen offered sovereignty over half the town to whoever could prove that he killed the snake. Several men brought snake heads forth, but the heads did not match the body. The old woman, owner of the house Bayajidda was staying in informed the queen that her guest had slain it, after which Daurama summoned Bayajidda. Having presented the snake's head, proving to her that he was the one who had slain Sarki, he turned down the offer of half the town instead requesting her hand in marriage; she married him out of gratitude for slaying the serpent.
