= Rano =

Rano Emirate Rauno
- LGA and town
- Nickname: Autan Bawo
- Interactive map of Rano Emirate
- Location in Nigeria
- Coordinates: 11°33′26″N 8°35′00″E
- Country: Nigeria
- State: Kano State

Government
  - First Class Emir: Alhaji Kabiru Muhammad Inuwa
  - Local Government Chairman: Muhammad Ñaziru Yau

Area
  - Total: 520 km^{2} (200 sq mi)

Population (2006 census)
  - Total: 145,439
  - Density: 280/km^{2} (720/sq mi)
- Time zone: UTC+1 (WAT)
- 3-digit postal code prefix: 710
- ISO 3166 code: NG.KN.RA

Rano is a town and Local Government Area and headquarter of Rano Emirate council in Kano State, Nigeria.

It has an area of 520 km^{2} and a population of 145,439 at the 2006 census.

== History ==
Rano was one of the seven legitimate Hausa states ("Hausa Bakwai") and according to tradition was founded by Zamna Kogi, a descendant of the legendary Bayajidda. During the reign of Yaji I (1349-85), the Kingdom of Kano conquered Rano and occupied it for two years, after which Rano continued to exist however never regained its sovereignty.

== Climate ==
The rainy season in Rano is oppressive and largely cloudy, the dry season is partly gloomy, and it is hot all year. Throughout the year, the temperature normally ranges from 54°F to 100 °F, with temperatures rarely falling below 48 °F or rising above 105 °F. The hot season, which runs from March 13 to May 15, lasts for 2.0 months and with daily highs that average more than 97 °F. In Rano, April is the warmest month of the year, with typical highs of 99 °F and lows of 72 °F. The 1.9-month cool season, which runs from November 29 to January 27 on average, has daily maximum temperatures that are lower than 88 °F. January is the coldest month of the year in Rano, with an average high temperature of 87 °F and low of 55 °F.

Rano experiences a climate classified as subtropical steppe (BSh). The district experiences an annual temperature of 32.68 °C (90.82 °F), which is 3.22% higher than the average for Nigeria. Rano experiences 66.95 wet days (18.34% of the time) and 52.93 millimeters (2.08 inches) of precipitation on average each year.

Rano LGA has an average temperature of 33 degrees Celsius or 91 degrees Fahrenheit with a total area of 520 square kilometres or 200 square miles. The two main seasons in the Local Government Area are the dry and the rainy seasons, with an average wind speed of 10 km/h (6.2 mph).
