= Faruk Umar Faruk =

Emir of Daura in Nigeria (born 1931)

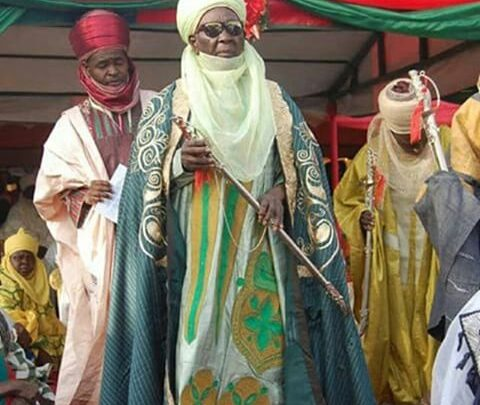

Emir of Daura
- Incumbent
- Assumed office 28 February 2007
- Preceded by: Muhammadu Bashar dan Umaru

Personal details
- Born: 1931 (age 94–95) Daura

Alhaji Faruk Umar Faruk (Hausa pronunciation, Hausa pronunciation; born 1931) or Umar Faruk Umar is the 60th Emir of the Daura Emirate. The Emirate is based in the town of Daura in Katsina State, northern Nigeria.

== Biography ==
Umar Faruq dan Umar was born in 1931. He became Emir of Daura, or Sarkin Daura, on 28 February 2007 following the death of Sarkin Muhammadu Bashar dan Umaru. A few months later he volunteered to stand security for former governor of Jigawa State, Saminu Turaki, who had been detained over allegations of corruption and money laundering after leaving office in May 2007. However, Turaki's successor as governor, Sule Lamido, persuaded him to change his mind.

In 2007 Faruk met President Umaru Yar'Adua with the Ooni of Ife Okunade Sijuade, the Emir of Kano Ado Bayero and the Emir of Zazzau Shehu Idris. Yar'Adua assured them that a constitutional role would be found for traditional leaders in Nigeria. In January 2009 Faruk represented the President's family, standing in for the bride during the marriage rites for a daughter of President Yar'Adua who was being married to the Bauchi State Governor Alhaji Isa Yuguda. In December 2007 he was awarded the honor of Commander of the Order of the Niger (CON). In July 2009 the European-American University Commonwealth of Dominica conferred an honorary doctorate award on Faruk for his role in nation building.

In April 2008 he turbaned Mr. Ndudi Elumelu, Chairman of the House of Representatives Committee on Power and Steel, as the Hasken Daura (Light of Daura). In November 2009 he turbaned the President of the Court of Appeal, Justice Umaru Abdullahi, as Walin Hausa. Normally the Muslim festive period of Id-El-Kabir includes a durbar held simultaneously in Daura and Katsina council areas. In December 2008 the Daura durbar was cancelled since the Emir was performing religious obligations in Saudi Arabia.

In February 2009 Faruk intervened to restore calm after mob violence broke out at Kongolam on the border with Niger in which seven people died. Later he asserted that the smugglers who caused the incident were outsiders, not residents of the border area. In the summer of 2009 the farmers of Katsina state suffered an invasion of quelea bird, which threatened to destroy their crops. Faruk advised them to stay calm and treat the event as an act of god, assuring them they would be given assistance. In February 2010 the Emir pledged thirty million naira of his own money to rebuild three old city gates and the "Kusugu well" monument in the emirate.

In 2010 he was a Director of First Fuel and Gas Limited.
