= Lawal Musa Daura =

Nigerian security agent

Lawal Musa Daura mni

Director - General, Department of State Services
- In office July 2, 2015 – August 7, 2018
- President: Muhammadu Buhari
- Preceded by: Ita Ekpeyong
- Succeeded by: Matthew B. Seiyefa

Personal details
- Born: 5 August 1953 (age 73) Daura, Northern Region, British Nigeria (now Daura, Nigeria)
- Education: Ahmadu Bello University; National Institute for Policy and Strategic Studies

Lawal Musa Daura mni (born August 5, 1953) is a former Nigerian security official who was the Director General of the State Security Service (SSS), from 2 July 2015 to 7 August 2018.

== Background and education ==
Lawal Musa Daura was born on 5 August 1953 in Daura. In 1980, he received a bachelor's degree from Ahmadu Bello University in Zaria and also trained at the National Institute for Policy and Strategic Studies in Kuru, Nigeria.

In 1982, Daura joined the National Security Organization (NSO) which was later replaced in 1986 with the State Security Service (SSS) by military head of state General Ibrahim Babangida. He rose through the ranks of the NSO and the subsequent SSS, eventually becoming a Director of Security in several states of the federation at various times: including Kano, Sokoto, Edo, Lagos, Osun and Imo.

== Sack and arrest ==
On August 12, 2018, Daura was sacked by Nigeria's acting President, Yemi Osinbajo, in connection with a security siege at the opposition-led National Assembly.
