= Jobawa =

Jobawa (Arabic: بانو جوبي)
Total population
- over 5 million (2013)

Regions with significant populations
- Nigeria, Niger

Languages
- Fulani Foreign Languages: English, French, Hausa, Arabic

Religion
- Islam

Related ethnic groups
- Fulani, Sullubawa, Muallimawa, Madinawa, Dambazawa, Yolawa, Modibawa, Danejawa, Jullubawa, Yeligawa, Ba'awa, Torankawa

The Jobawa (بانو جوبي) are a sub clan of the Fulani ethnic group. Primarily found in the old Eastern Kano, they were the first Fulani clan to make contact with the Hausa people.

== History ==
The Jobawa were reportedly the first Fula people to make contact with the central Sudan, thus sparking the possibility of them being a Pre-Tengualla Fulani migration from the primordial Fula body. At some point during the 14th century, the Jobawa emerged as a power in the East of the Sultanate of Kano and shortly afterward became the natural heirs to the Makama of Kano. (an office they still hold to this day).

On learning the reputation of Shehu Usman dan Fodio, Malam Umaru, a Fulani of Waijobe stock took his daughter Habiba to the Shehu's home at Degel in North Western Gobir and asked the Shehu to accept his daughter as a pupil, when the Shehu agreed Habiba immediately asked if he would also consent to teach her younger brother Ahmadu, who later acquired the lakabi or nick name Malam Bakatsine, the Shehu is said to have replied in Fulfulde ja ba do meaning your wish is granted, in order to honour this event the issues of Malam Umaru are called Jobawa, the Muallimawa dynasty is a sub-clan of the Jobawa.

During the reign of Sarkin Kano Aliyu Babba he appointed Sarkin Takai Umaru Dan Maisaje as Makaman Kano, his link with the Jobawa is traced through his father's mother Habiba, the sister of Malam Bakatsine, in making the appointment the traditional requisite of being an agnatic descendant was not considered, the action resulted in a precedence being established for Jobawa descendants with paternal or maternal links to aspire to be appointed as Makaman Kano.

== Jihad period ==
During the Fulani jihads of the 19th century the jobawa were instrumental to the pacification of the Sultanate of Kano. A switching of allegiance by Muhammadu Bakatsine, the then Makama of Kano and Magajin Jobe at the epic battle of 'Daukar Girma' turned the tide of the Kano campaigns in favour of the Fulanis. Bakatsine was later to become one of the Seven Founding fathers of the Kano Emirate ensuring for the Jobe a place in the newly founded Sokoto Caliphate.

However after the jihad, the leadership of the New Kano Emirate was given to the clan of Mundubawa under Suleman Abu Hama, but as recompense, Mandikko Ibn Bakatsine, the son of Muhammadu Bakatsine was made the first Madaki of the Kano Emirate. The Jobe also retained control of the office of Makama and much of Eastern Kano except for the Fortresses of Gaya and Birnin Kudu, making them custodians of more than two - thirds of the emirate.

== Notable Jobawa ==
- Murtala Muhammed, related to Jobawa from his maternal side (through his mother), former Head of State.
- Abdullahi Aliyu Sumaila related to Jobawa through his paternal great-grandmother Binta the daughter of Sarkin Sumaila Akilu.
