= Rano Emirate =

Emirate in Kano State, Nigeria

Rano Emirate is a second-class emirate located in Kano State, Nigeria, in established in 2024. It is also one of the oldest settlements in Northern Nigeria, dating back to the 6th century AD. Rano Emirate has a rich and diverse cultural heritage, with historical monuments such as rocks, walls, and palaces. Rano Emirate has historically been part of the Kano Emirate, which was a Muslim state that emerged from the Fulani jihad in the early 19th century. Rano Emirate has had three ruling dynasties: the Kwararrafawa, the Habe, and the Fulani.

== Dissolution and re-establishment ==
On May 23, 2024, Kano State Governor Abba Kabir Yusuf dissolved the Rano Emirate along with four other emirates established in 2019 by former governor Abdullahi Umar Ganduje. This action restored the state's traditional structure of a single emirate, reverting to its pre-2019 arrangement. The areas under the Rano Emirate were reintegrated into the Kano Emirate, aiming to enhance administrative efficiency and historical continuity. Sanusi Lamido Sanusi II was installed as the Emir of Kano the same day, unifying the leadership and governance under one emirate. This move intended to streamline traditional governance in Kano State.

In July of 2024, Rano Emirate was re-established as a second-class emirate under the authority of the Kano Emirate. Rano consists of the Rano, Kibiya and Bunkure local government areas.

== Emirs ==
- Alhaji Tafida Abubakar Ila Auta Bawo (9 May 2019 - May 2020)
- Kabiru Muhammad Inuwa (May 2020 - May 2024)
- Alhaji Muhammad Isa Umar (July 2024 - present)
