= Kabara (title) =

Historical title of matriarchal monarchs of the Hausa people

Kabara, also known as Magajiya, is a chieftaincy title used by the matriarchal monarchs that ruled the Hausa people in medieval times. The Kano Chronicle gives the following list of matriarchal monarchs that was said to have culminated and ended with the rule of Daurama II, the last Kabara of Daura.

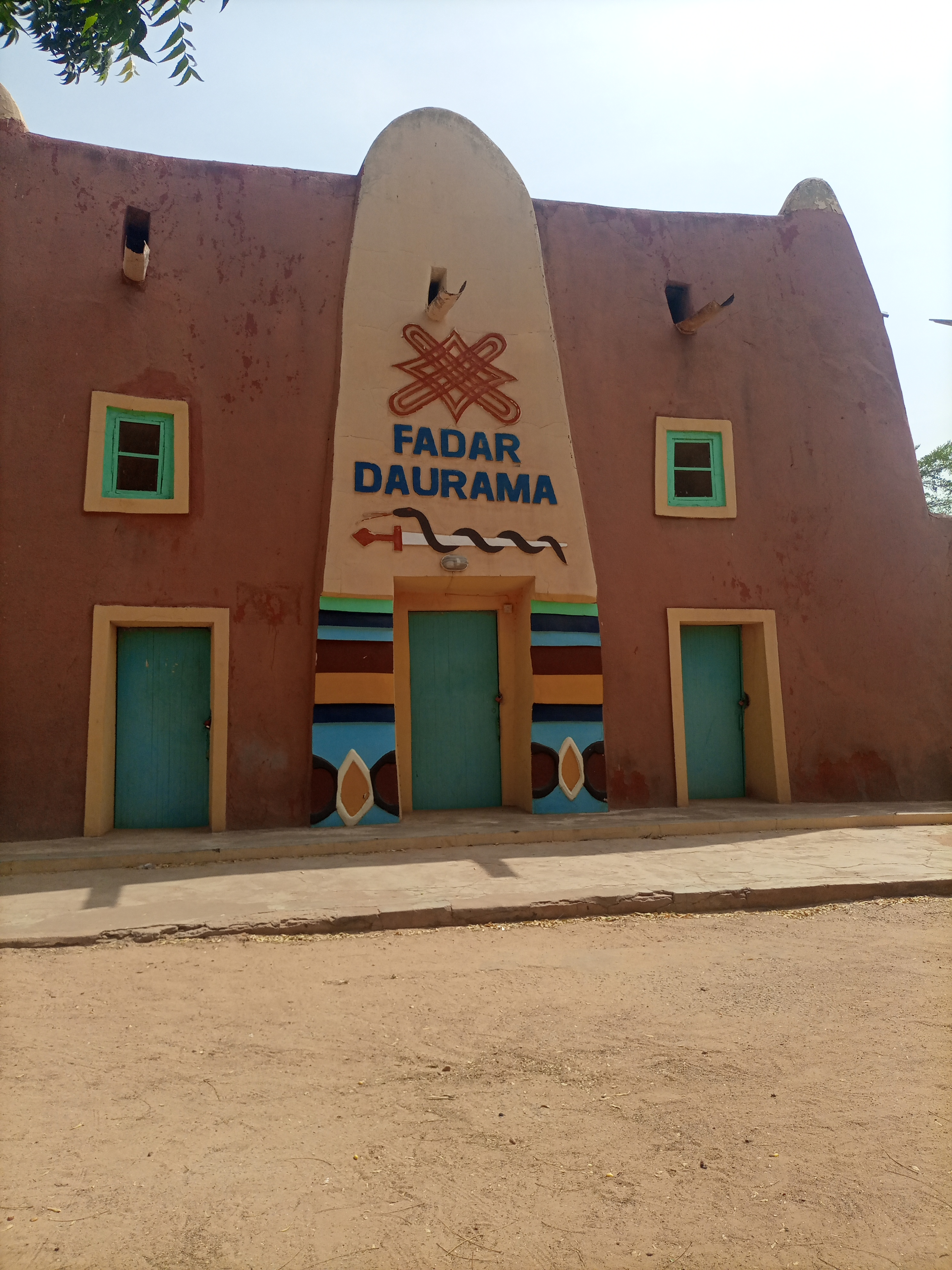
Daurama Palace, sit of Kabaras

== Kabaras ==
List of Kabaras:

1. Kufuru (also known as Kofano) (c. 700)
2. Ginu (also known as Gufano)
3. Yakumo (also known as Yakwano)
4. Yakunya (also known as Yakaniya)
5. Wanzamu (also known as Waizam)
6. Yanbamu
7. Gizir-gizir (also known as Gizirgirit or Gadar Gadar)
8. Inna-Gari (also known as Anagiri)
9. Daurama (also known as Daura)
10. Ga-Wata (also known as Gamata)
11. Shata
12. Fatatuma (also known as Batatume)
13. Sai-Da-Mata (also known as Sandamata)
14. Ja-Mata
15. Ha-Mata
16. Zama
17. Sha-Wata (c. 1000)
18. Daurama II
