= Yaji II =

- Sarkin Kano
- Reign: 1753-1768
- Predecessor: Alhaji Kabe
- Successor: Babba Zaki
- House: Bagauda Dynasty
- Father: Dadi
- Mother: Mariamma

Yaji II was a Sultan of Kano who reigned from 1753 to 1768.

== Biography in the Kano Chronicle ==
Below is a biography of Yaji II from Palmer's 1908 English translation of the Kano Chronicle.

The 40th Sarki was Mohamma Yaji, son of Dadi. His mother’s name was Mariamma. He was a just and good Sarki, and a man of mild disposition. On account of this his wives called him “Mallam Lafia.” In his time there was no trouble.

He ruled in harmony with his brothers, the sons of Bauwo. There was no difficulty either with his Sarkis or his chief slaves, or his household, or any one. Many men came and settled in Kano-land in his reign.

He reigned 15 years and 10 months.

— Kano Chronicle

Preceded by Alhaji Kabe	Sarkin Kano; 1753-1768	Succeeded by Babba Zaki
