= Hausa Kingdoms =

Collection of states started by the Hausa people

- Person: m: Bahaushe f: Bahaushiya
- People: Hausawa
- Language: Harshen Hausa / Halshen Hausa
- Country: Kasar Hausa / Masarautun Hausa

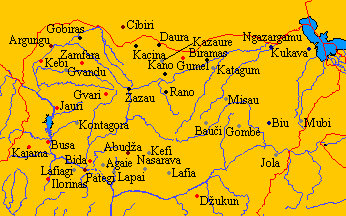
Major cities of Hausaland. Modern borders are in red.

The Hausa Kingdoms (Masarautun Hausa), also known as Hausaland (Kasar Hausa), were a collection of states ruled by the Hausa people, (Note: The first uses of "Hausa" as an ethnonym date from the 16th and 17th centuries, prior to this ethnonyms were based on the states, such as Kanawa for Kano, Katsinawa for Katsina, Gobirawa for Gobir etc.) before the Fulani jihads. They were situated between the Niger River and Lake Chad (modern day northern Nigeria). Hausaland lay between the Western Sudanic empires of Ancient Ghana, Mali and Songhai and the Eastern Sudanic empire of Kanem-Bornu.

Hausa oral traditions detail the Bayajidda legend, which describes the adventures of the Baghdadi hero, Bayajidda, culminating in the killing of the snake in a well at Daura and his marriage to the local queen Magajiya Daurama. According to the legend, Bayajidda's descendants founded the Hausa Bakwai (seven "true" states), as well as the Hausa Banza ("bastard" or "illegitimate" states).

== Mythology ==
According to the Bayajidda legend, the Hausa states were founded by the sons and grandsons of Bayajidda, a prince of Baghdad who married Daurama, the last Kabara of Daura, and heralded the end of the matriarchal monarchs that had erstwhile ruled the Hausa people. According to the legend, Bayajidda travelled through Bornu, arriving at Daura, where he went to the house of an old woman called Waira and asked her to give him water but she told him the predicament of the land, how the only well in Daura, called Kusugu, was inhabited by a snake called Sarki, who allowed citizens of Daura to fetch water only on Fridays. Since sarki is the Hausa word for "king", this may have been a metaphor for a powerful figure. Bayajidda killed Sarki and because of what he had done the queen married him for his bravery. After his marriage to Daurama the people started to call him Bayajidda which means "he didn't understand (the language) before".

=== Hausa Bakwai ===
The Hausa Bakwai were the seven "true" states (birane) that all Hausa people are said to derive from. According to tradition, Bayajidda and Daurama's son, Bawo, had six further sons with three wives (two per wife) who each founded a kingdom. Biram, the seventh kingdom, was founded by another son of Bayajidda, who he had had with a Kanuri princess (called Magira) while he was at Bornu. Daura is the "mother city" of the Hausa states.

- Daura (Gazaura ascended to the throne)
- Kano (ruled by Bagauda)
- Katsina (founded by Kumayau)
- Zazzau (founded by Gunguma)
- Gobir (founded by Duma)
- Rano (founded by Zamna Kogi)
- Biram/Garun Gobas (ruled by Biram, city now called "Hadejia")

=== Hausa Banza/Banza Bakwai ===
The Hausa Banza or Banza Bakwai were referred to as the "bastard" or "illegitimate" states. According to tradition, Bayajidda had a third son with his concubine called Mukarbigari. Mukarbigari's descendants are then said to have founded seven other states which bordered the Hausa Bakwai to the west and south. Hausa tradition often refers to these as inferior to the Hausa Bakwai. Apart from Zamfara and Kebbi, the members of the Hausa Banza were neighbours of Hausaland, although notably it omits Kanem-Bornu and Songhai. Borgu is sometimes included in the Hausa Banza. They are:

- Zamfara (inhabited by Hausa-speakers) (Note: Some traditions include Zamfara in the Hausa Bakwai.)
- Kebbi (inhabited by Hausa-speakers)
- Yauri
- Gwari
- Kwararafa (state of the Abakwariga (non-Muslim Hausa) or Jukun people)
- Nupe (state of the Nupe people)
- Yoruba (Yoruba people)

== History ==
=== Origins and rise ===
Hausa oral traditions hold that settlements were first established where iskoki (nature spirits) were found. Hausaland had great agricultural potential, and early positions of authority related to control of the land, fostered by kinship relations. Hausa chiefs were either family heads (gidaje) or religious officials tasked with rituals intended to ensure agricultural prosperity (sarkin noma; "kings of farming"). The date of the foundation of the Hausa kingdoms is unknown, however urbanisation in northern Nigeria led to the formation of states, with fortified capital cities becoming centres of power and rule. The kingdoms controlled trade in the region, and were possibly first mentioned by Ya'qubi in the 9th century. Hausa traders founded quarters (sabon gari) in various places, building an elaborate and efficient trading network. Civilians would sometimes follow their armies as traders or to provide services, and settle abroad, contributing to the diaspora.

Hausa tradition describes the division of roles between the states, where Kano and Rano were centres of the textile industry (and thus called sarakuman babba; "kings of indigo"), Katsina and Daura were trade centres (called sarakuman kasuwa; "kings of the market"), Zazzau supplied slave labour to the other states (called sarkin bayi; "king of the slaves"), and Gobir, as the northernmost city, was tasked with the defence of Hausaland from foreign invaders (called sarkin yaki; "king of war"). Throughout its history there was lots of immigration from the Sahel and Sudan into Hausaland, including herdsmen, fishermen, agriculturalists, merchants and traders, and mallam, as well as some aristocrats. Migrations from Bornu are thought to have been more long-standing, and Tuareg (who displaced the Gobirawa from Asben) and Fulani migrated to the region from the 14th and 15th centuries respectively. As nomadic pastoralists they sometimes made incursions into Hausaland looking for grazing land. Another group was the Wangara, who migrated in the 14th/15th centuries and were key to the spread of Islam through Hausaland. Though Islam likely spread to Hausaland from the north through Gobir or the east from Bornu, the first ruler to convert to Islam is thought to have been Yaji I of Kano (r. 1349–85) due to invitation from Wangara. The Wangara, like Songhai immigrants, gradually integrated and became Hausa.

During the reign of Kano's Yaji I (1349–85) he conquered and occupied Rano for two years, after which Rano continued to exist but never regained its sovereignty. In the 15th century, a deposed mai of Bornu fled to Kano, leading to Bornu expanding westwards and vassalizing the Hausa states. It is unclear whether this included all of the states, or just Kano and Biram as M. G. Smith thought; regardless, tribute was sent through Daura. While it is unknown for how long Hausa states paid this tribute, Bornu continued to hold influence in the region.

=== 16th century onwards ===
By the 15th century, the Hausa kingdoms were trading centers which competed with Kanem-Bornu and the Mali Empire. The primary exports were slaves, leather, gold, cloth, salt, kola nuts, animal hides, and henna. At various moments in their history, the Hausa managed to establish central control over their states, but such unity has always proven short. During the reign of King Yaji I (1349–85) Islam was first introduced to Kano via daʿwah from Soninke Wangara, and Islamisation often syncretised with Hausa animism. Many Muslim traders and clerics used to come from Mali, from the Volta region, and later from Songhay. King Yaji appointed a Qadi and Imam as part of the state administration. Muhammad Rumfa (1463–99) built mosques and madrassahs. He also commissioned Muhammad al-Maghili to write a treatise on Muslim governance. Many other scholars were brought in from Egypt, Tunis, and Morocco. This turned Kano and Katsina into centers of Islamic scholarship. Islamization facilitated the expansion of trade and was the basis of an enlarged marketing network. The Ulama provided legal support, guarantees, safe conducts, introductions and many other services. By the end of the 15th century, Muhammad al-Korau, a cleric, took control of Katsina declaring himself king. Ulama were later brought in from North Africa and Egypt to reside in Katsina. An Ulama class emerged under royal patronage. The Hausa rulers fasted Ramadan, built mosques, kept up the five obligatory prayers, and gave alms (zakat) to the poor. Ibrahim Maje (1549–66) was an Islamic reformer and instituted Islamic marriage law in Katsina. Generally Hausaland remained divided between the Muslim cosmopolitan urban elite and the local animistic rural communities. During this time period, Leo Africanus briefly mentions in his book Descrittione dell’Africa descriptions of the political and economic state of Hausaland during that time although it is unknown if he actually visited it; Hausaland seems to have been mostly of a tributary status by Songhai as in his description of Zamfara he comments that "their king was slaughtered by the Askiya and themselves made tributary" and the same is said for the rest of the region.

=== Fall ===
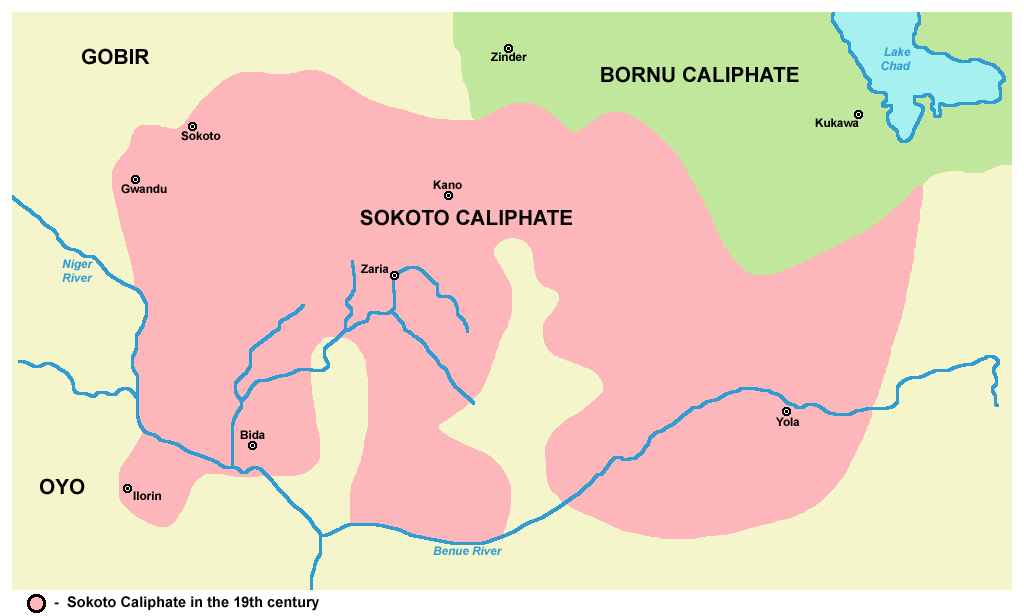
Hausa-Fulani Sokoto Caliphate in the 19th century

Despite relatively constant growth from the 15th century to the 18th century, the states were vulnerable to constant war internally and externally. By the 18th century, they were economically and politically exhausted. Famines became very common during this period and the Sultans engaged in heavy taxation to fund their wars. Though the vast majority of its inhabitants were Muslim, by the 19th century, they were conquered by a mix of Fulani warriors and Hausa peasantry, citing syncretism and social injustices. By 1808 the Hausa states were finally conquered by Usuman dan Fodio and incorporated into the Hausa-Fulani Sokoto Caliphate.

== Government ==
Fulani pastoralists and foreign Islamic clerics were permitted to control their own administration under the supervision of the sarki (king).

== Culture and society ==
Ideals on social order were based on kinship, and foreign civilians were incorporated into the system by intermarriage, social reclassification, or were granted special privileges. Commerce between the states facilitated a common Hausa language, without mutually unintelligible dialects. Despite the conversion of rulers to Islam, many commoners continued to practice their traditional religion, or syncretised it with Islam, which was considered acceptable up until the Fula jihads in the 19th century. Commoners (talakawa) comprised units of farms operated by two or more families (gandu) which were headed by a legal representative (maigida). The maigida administered the unit and was tasked with reconciling disputes and ritualistic roles in ceremonies. New gandu were set up by a father adding to their son's land, to eventually be recognised as a distinct unit for tax purposes. This ideal patrilineal system was often disrupted by divorce (due to polygynous marriage being common), strong matrilineal bonds, and occupational specialisation. Men had titles corresponding to their occupations outside of farming season. Unmarried adults were considered social outcasts.

== See also ==
- Hausa animism
- Hausa literature
