= Daura =

- City and LGA
- Interactive map of Daura
- Location in Nigeria
- Coordinates: 13°2′11″N 8°19′4″E
- Country: Nigeria
- State: Katsina

Government
  - Emir: Faruk Umar Faruk
- Elevation: 474 m (1,555 ft)
- Time zone: UTC+1 (West Africa Time)

Daura is a city and local government area in Katsina State, northwestern Nigeria. It is the spiritual home of the Hausa people. The emirate is referred to as one of the "seven true Hausa states" (Hausa Bakwai) because it was (along with Biram, Kano, Katsina, Zazzau, Gobir, and Rano), ruled by the descendants of Bayajidda's sons with Daurama and Magira (his first wife). The University of California's African American Studies Department refers to Daura, as well as Katsina, as having been "ancient seats of Islamic culture and learning."

== History ==
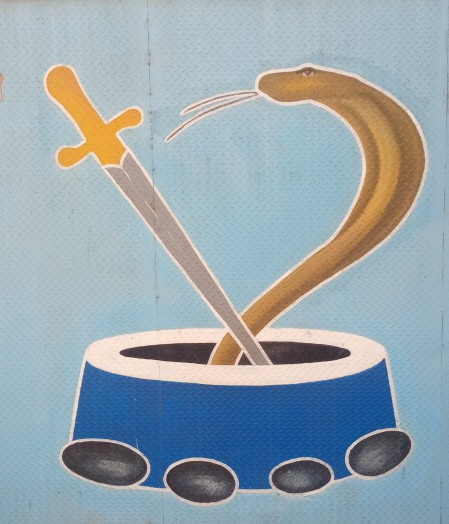
Daura

The original people who inherited Daura were called the Hausa people

Daura is the city that, according to legend (in about the 9th century), Bayajidda, a figure from Hausa mythology, arrived at after his trek across the Sahara. Once there, he killed a snake (named Sarki, meaning "King") who prevented the people from drawing water from the well, and the local queen, Magajiya Daurama, married him out of gratitude; one of their seven children was named Daura. The Kusugu Well in Daura where Bayajidda is said to have slain Sarki is protected by a wooden shelter and has become a tourist attraction.

In 1805, during the Fulani War, Daura was taken over by Fulani warrior Malam Ishaku, who set up an emirate. The Hausa set up rival states nearby, and the ruler of one, Malam Musa, was made the new emir of Daura by the British in 1904, While Fulani emirs reigned and established a rival kingdoms at Daure-Zango (Zango) and at Daure-Baure (Baure). Zango (founded in 1825) was the more prominent Hausa-Daura kingdom, and in 1903–04, after the British and French had divided the three Daura polities, the British installed Zango's king, Malam Musa, as the new emir of Daura. Part of former North-Central state after 1967, the traditional emirate was incorporated into Kaduna State in 1976. It became part of the newly created Katsina state in 1987. Faruk Umar Faruk became the 60th Emir of Daura on 28 February 2007 following the death of Sarkin Muhammadu Bashar dan Umaru.

== Emirate ==
The Daura Royal Palace 'Kangiwa' is a huge complex located at the Centre of the ancient city. It is a symbol of culture, history and traditions of 'Daurawa'. The Daura Emirate is referred to as one of the "seven true Hausa states" (Hausa Bakwai)

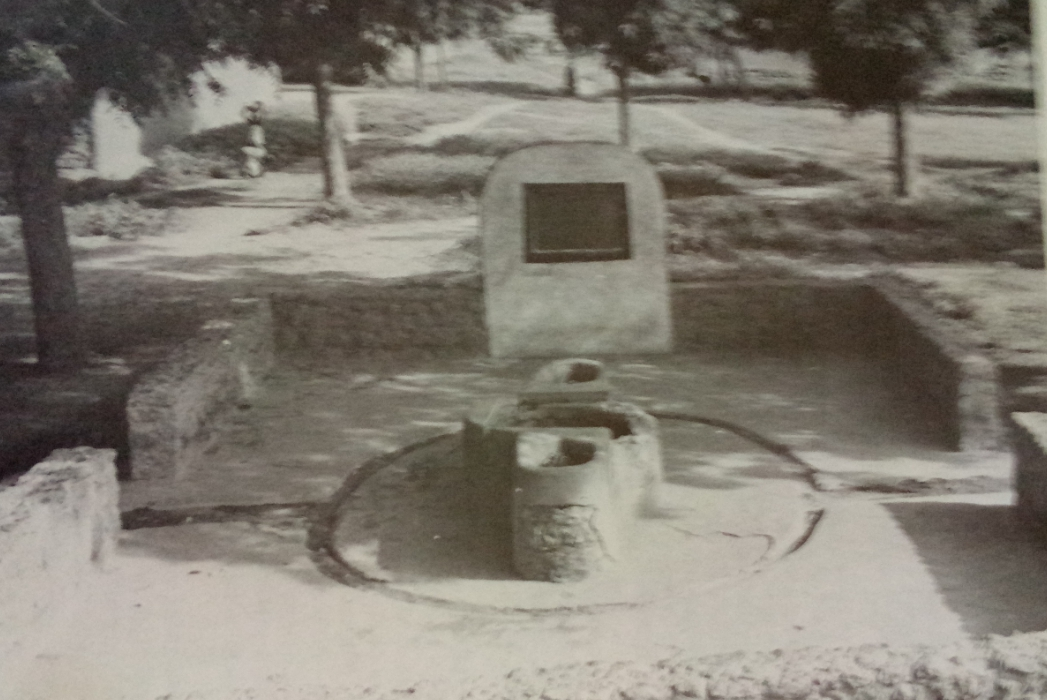
The Well of Daura serve as tourism in Hausa land

In 1805, during the Fulani War, Daura was taken over by Fulani warrior Malam Ishaku, who set up an emirate. The Hausa set up rival states nearby, and the ruler of one, Malam Musa, was made the new emir of Daura by the British in 1904. The Emir of Daura still rules as a ceremonial hereditary monarch, and maintains a palace. Umar Faruk Umar became the 60th Emir of Daura on 28 February 2007 following the death of Sarki Muhammadu Bashar Dan Umaru.

== Economy ==
Trade in Daura is primarily in sorghum, millet, onions, peanuts (groundnuts), cotton, and hides and skins; cattle, goats, sheep, horses, and donkeys are kept by its Hausa and Fulani inhabitants. Cotton weaving and peanut collecting (for export) are significant economic activities. The town is served by a government health office and a dispensary. However, Daura town became a Caravan Centre for salt and potash from the Sahara Desert and for cloth, slaves, leather, and agricultural produce from the south; but it never gained the political or military prominence of Katsina (49 miles [79 km] west) or of Kano (73 miles [117 km] south). Daura is one among the few where crops are grown all the year round. Apart from Government's encouragement and general incentives to both large and small scale, peasant farming over the years, has been quite commendable.

== Education ==
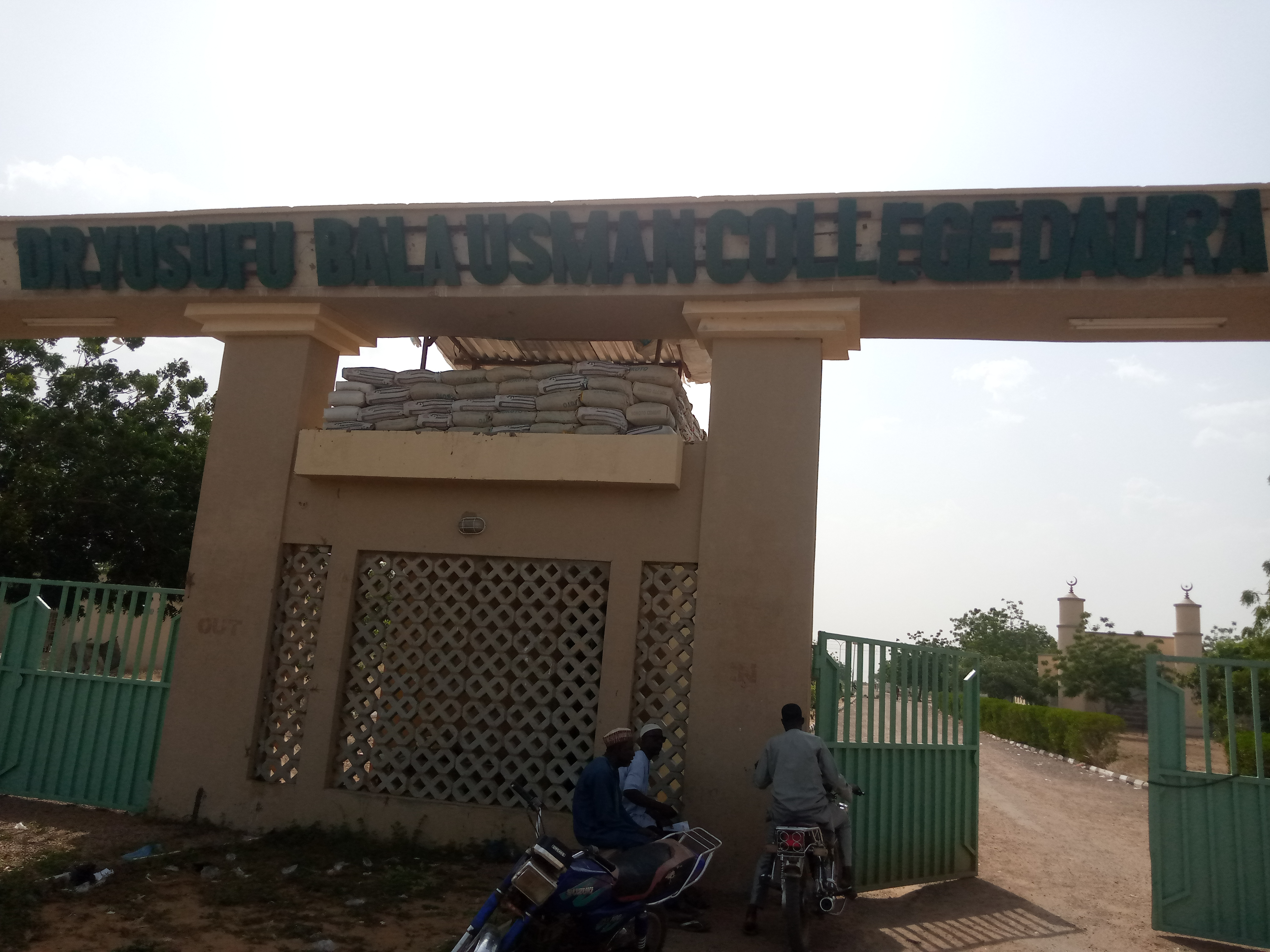
Legal Daura katsina state

Daura is a centre of both formal and informal education. The education system is the 6-3-3-4 system, which is practiced throughout the country (as well as by many other members of the Economic Community of West African States). The levels are Primary, Junior Secondary School (JSS), Senior Secondary School (SSS) and University. All children are offered basic education, with special focus now on the first nine years. Daura is home to various primary, secondary, postsecondary schools, and other vocational institutions that are either operated by the government or private entities. With higher institutions like theSome of them are University of Transportation, Yusufu Bala Usman College, Sani Zango College of Health Technology, and Federal Polytechnic, amongst others.

== Durbar Festival ==
The emir of Daura hosts a Durbar to mark and celebrate the two annual Muslim festivals: Eid al-Fitr (to mark the end of the Holy Month of Ramadan) and Eid al-Adha (to mark the Hajj Holy Pilgrimage). In addition to these, he also hosts a Durbar of Gani which is celebrated often on the 12th day of Rabi' al-awwal, the third month in the Islamic calendar.

The Durbar culminates in a procession of highly elaborately dressed horsemen who pass through the city to the emir's palace. Once assembled near the palace, groups of horsemen, each group representing a nearby village, take it in turns to charge toward the emir, pulling up just feet in front of the seated dignitaries to offer their respect and allegiance.

== Demography ==
The Hausa people (sometimes grouped with the Fulani as Hausa-Fulani) are the largest ethnic group.

== Health Care ==
Daura has many hospitals and medical facilities.The Daura healthcare system is generally divided into public and private sectors which provide medical services at the primary and secondary levels. Although the private hospitals are usually more expensive, it does not necessarily translate to better healthcare delivery.

== Population and geographic statistics ==
Daura's population was estimated as 25,151 as of 1972. According to the MARA/ARMA organization, malaria affects Daura for four to six months of the year, and is "endemic and seasonal." In 2005, after an outbreak of measles in Katsina State, Daura became one of five training centers for workers who were to carry out immunization.

On vehicle license plates, Daura is abbreviated as DRA.

== Climate ==
The dry season is oppressively hot and partially cloudy in Daura, whereas the wet season is oppressively hot and generally cloudy. The temperature rarely falls below 11 °C (52 °F) or rises over 42 °C (108 °F) throughout the year, often ranging from 14 °C (57 °F) to 39 °C (103 °F).

The hot season lasts for 2.3 months, from 10 March to 19 May, with an average daily high temperature of above 37 °C (99 °F). The hottest month of the year in Daura is April, with an average high temperature of 39 °C (103 °F) and low temperature of 24 °C (75 °F).

The 2.4-month cool season, which runs from 17 July to 29 September, has an average daily maximum temperature of less than 31 °C (88 °F). Daura experiences its coldest month of the year in January, with an average low of 14 °C (58 °F) and high of 32 °C (90 °F).

=== Cloud ===
Over the course of the year, Daura's average percentage of cloud-covered sky varies significantly by season. At Daura, the clearer portion of the year starts about November 7 and lasts for 3.9 months, finishing about March 5. With 60% of the sky being clear, mostly clear, or partially cloudy on average, January is the clearest month of the year in Daura. March 5 is when the cloudier portion of the year starts, and it lasts for 8.1 months, finishing on November 7. In Daura, May is the cloudiest month of the year with an average of 69% of the sky being gloomy or overcast.

== Notable people ==
- Sani Daura Ahmed, First Governor of Yobe State 1991–1998.
- Muhammadu Buhari, Military Head of State (1983–1985), and President of Nigeria (2015-2023).
- Salisu Buhari, former Speaker of the House of Representatives of Nigeria.
- Habu Daura, Acting Governor of Bayelsa State, from February to June 1997.
- Lawal Musa Daura, former Director General of the Nigerian State Security Service.
- Mamman Daura, Editor of the New Nigerian (1969–1975), Chairman of Nigerian Television Authority (1984–1985), former board director and chairman of the Africa International Bank.
- Sani Zangon Daura, Minister of Agriculture and Rural Development.
- Ja'afar Mahmud Adam, Salafist Islamic scholar aligned with the Izala Societyevelopment 1999 – 2000, Minister of Environment 2000 – 2001.
- Faruk Umar Faruk, Current and 60th Emir of Daura.

== See also ==
- Daura Emirate
- Kusugu
