= Buhari's anti-corruption war =

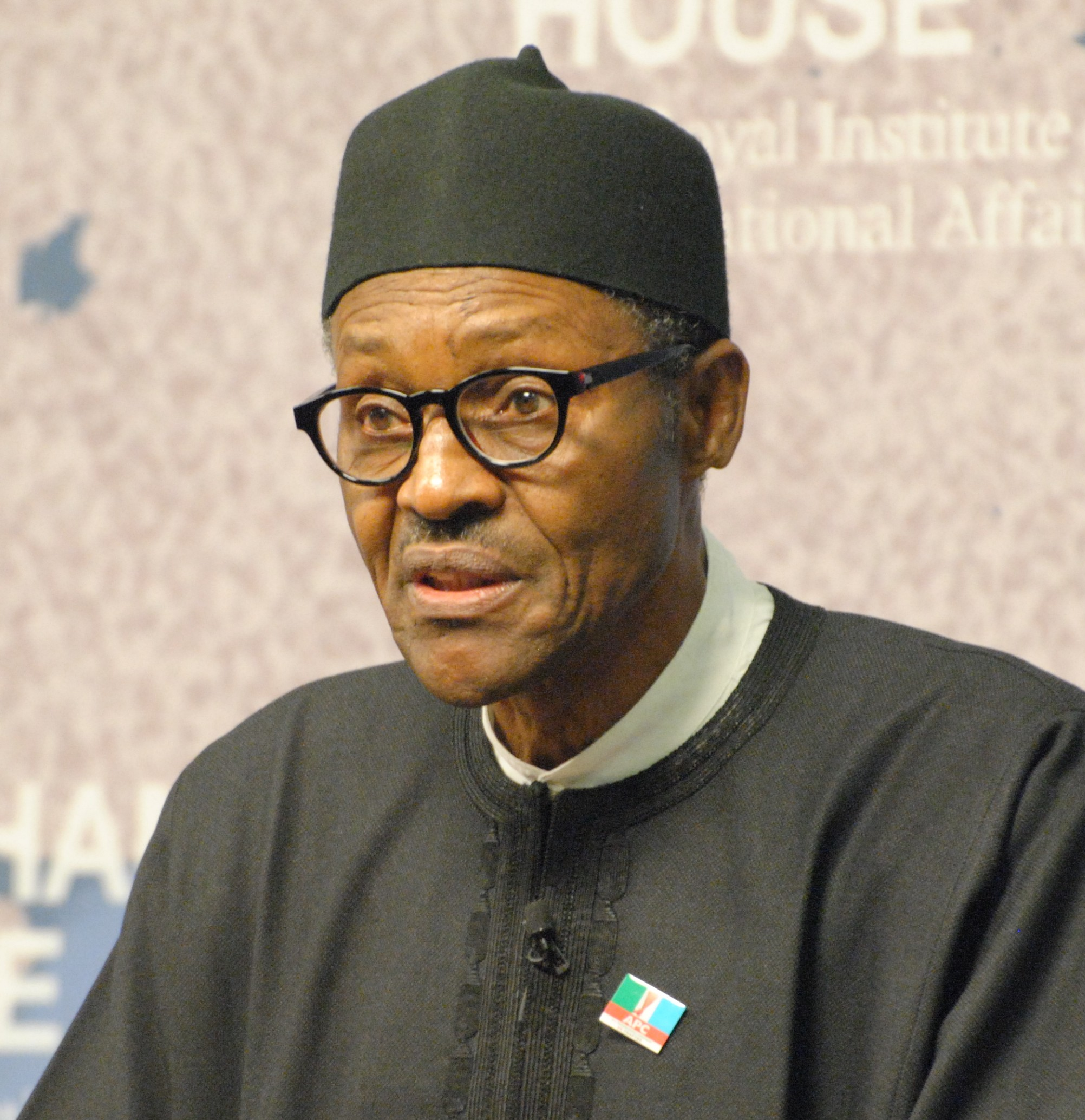
President Muhammadu Buhari

Anti-corruption war (between May 2015 and May 2023) was an anti-graft campaign launched by the government of Muhammadu Buhari, the 6th democratic President of Nigeria. During the president's election campaign in 2015, he had vowed to fight against corruption and insecurity if elected. The U.S. Secretary of State, John Kerry, at the World Economic Forum held at Davos in Switzerland extolled Buhari's anti-corruption fight. In October 2015, the United Kingdom pledged support for Buhari's anti-corruption war. According to Grant Shapps, the minister for international development, "UK is fully committed to helping Nigeria increase its security, stability and prosperity. "We would continue to provide capacity building, technical and investigative support to Nigeria to tackle corruption. Corruption in Nigeria also affects the UK directly. Where we have evidence, we will continue to take action to protect the integrity of the UK's financial system and prevent. William Kumuyi, the founder and general overseer of Deeper Christian Life Ministry described Buhari's anti-corruption war as a step in right direction. However, the president has been criticized and accused of leading a selective war against corruption. Several people claimed that his war against corruption focused on members of the opposition party, the People's Democratic Party.

In May 2018, the Nigerian Economic and Financial Crimes Commission (EFCC) announced that 603 Nigerian figures had been convicted on corruption charges since Buhari took office in 2015. The EFCC also announced that for the first time in Nigeria's history, judges and top military officers including retired service chiefs are being prosecuted for corruption. The successful prosecutions were also credited to EFCC head Ibrahim Magu Under Buhari, Chief Justice of the Nigerian Court Walter Onnoghen was convicted by the Code of Conduct Tribunal on April 18, 2019 for false assets declaration. and accused Federal High Court Judge Adeniyi Ademola resigned involuntarily in December 2017 In December 2019, the country's controversial ex-Attorney General Mohammed Adoke, who was accused of being bribed to grant oil licenses to Shell, was extradited to back Nigeria from Dubai and was immediately arrested.

In May 2020, it was announced that Chinese construction entrepreneurs Meng Wei Kun and Xu Koi were arrested in Sokoto State on corruption charges involving bribes to former government officials in Zamfara State. Magu would also be arrested in July 2020 on corruption charges as well. In December 2020, former Pension Reform Taskforce head Abdulrasheed Maina, who was arrested in the neighboring country of Niger after jumping bail, appeared in a Abuja court on a 12-count charge of fraud and money laundering. An accomplice Ali Ndume, a senator representing Borno South, was arrested after jumping bail as well.

== Criticisms ==
On 24 January 2016, Chief Olu Falae, a prominent Nigerian politician and former secretary to the Federal Government of Nigeria said "Buhari's anti-corruption war is selective and getting out of hand". Olu Falae had earlier been named one of the beneficiaries of the controversial $2 billion arms deal, an allegation he refuted in an interview with The Punch.

On 24 August 2015, Abdulkadir Balarabe Musa, a former governor of Kaduna State challenged President Muhammadu to probe his military regime between 1983 and 1985 if he was really serious about anti-corruption war. He accused the president of violation of federal character law. On 8 February 2016, Ezenwo Nyesom Wike, the governor of Rivers State and former minister of state for education in the Cabinet of President Goodluck Jonathan accused the president of bias in his anti-corruption war. He said he would rather fight corruption in his own way than to support Muhammadu Buhari's anti-corruption war. On 27 September 2015, Dr. Frederick Fasehun, the founder of Oodua Peoples Congress advised the president to shun selective justice and focus on good governance. On 21 January 2016, Fasheun urged the president to slow down in his fight against corruption saying that the government may run into problems in the way the anti-graft war is being handled by the president. He strongly condemned the handcuffing of Chief Olisa Metuh, the National Publicity Secretary of the People's Democratic Party. He described it as unhealthy for Nigeria.

In a report titled "Heavy Knocks For Buhari’s Anti-Corruption" published by Sahara Reporters on 31 October 2015, Debo Adeniran, the Executive Chairman of the Coalition Against Corrupt Leaders claimed he had on several occasions, petitioned the president and the anti-graft agencies, the Economic and Financial Crimes Commission and Independent Corrupt Practices Commission levying corruption and misappropriation of fund against Babatunde Fashola, a former governor of Lagos State and the incumbent Minister for Power, Works and Housing in the Cabinet of President Muhammadu Buhari. He also mentioned that several allegation of corruption and misappropriation of fund were slammed on Kayode Fayemi, the former governor of Ekiti State, Kemi Adeosun, the incumbent minister of finance, Rotimi Amaechi, a former governor of Rivers State and current minister of transport. He expressed concern on why these people had not been invited by the anti-graft agencies for questioning. He said "We are dissatisfied with the way the anti-corruption war is being fought and we are afraid that we may not achieve anything better than what we had before Buhari assumed office."

In January 2016, Bishop Hyacinth Oroko Egbebo of Apostolic Vicariate of Bomadi, during the consecration of a Catholic priest under his vicariate, expressed concern over what he described as "high level of impunity and abuse of human rights in the anti-corruption war of President Muhammadu Buhari". He accused Buhari of selective anti-graft war. He raised a concern over how Buhari disobeys court order in his fight against corruption. He said "In as much as we would want to commend President Buhari on his zero tolerance on corruption, it is very disheartening and a risk to our democracy that the President would have the impunity to set aside court orders under the guise of his anti-corruption war".

In January 2016, Carol Ajie, a constitutional lawyer petitioned President Barack Obama and National Judicial Council over the disobedience of court order by President Muhammadu Buhari in his fight against corruption. She called for Buhari's resignation or face impeachment proceedings. The petition was signed by over 200 lawyers in the country.

As of January 2020, Nigeria ranks low in Transparency International's corruption perception index, achieving a rank of 146 out of 180 countries surveyed.

== Cases reported ==
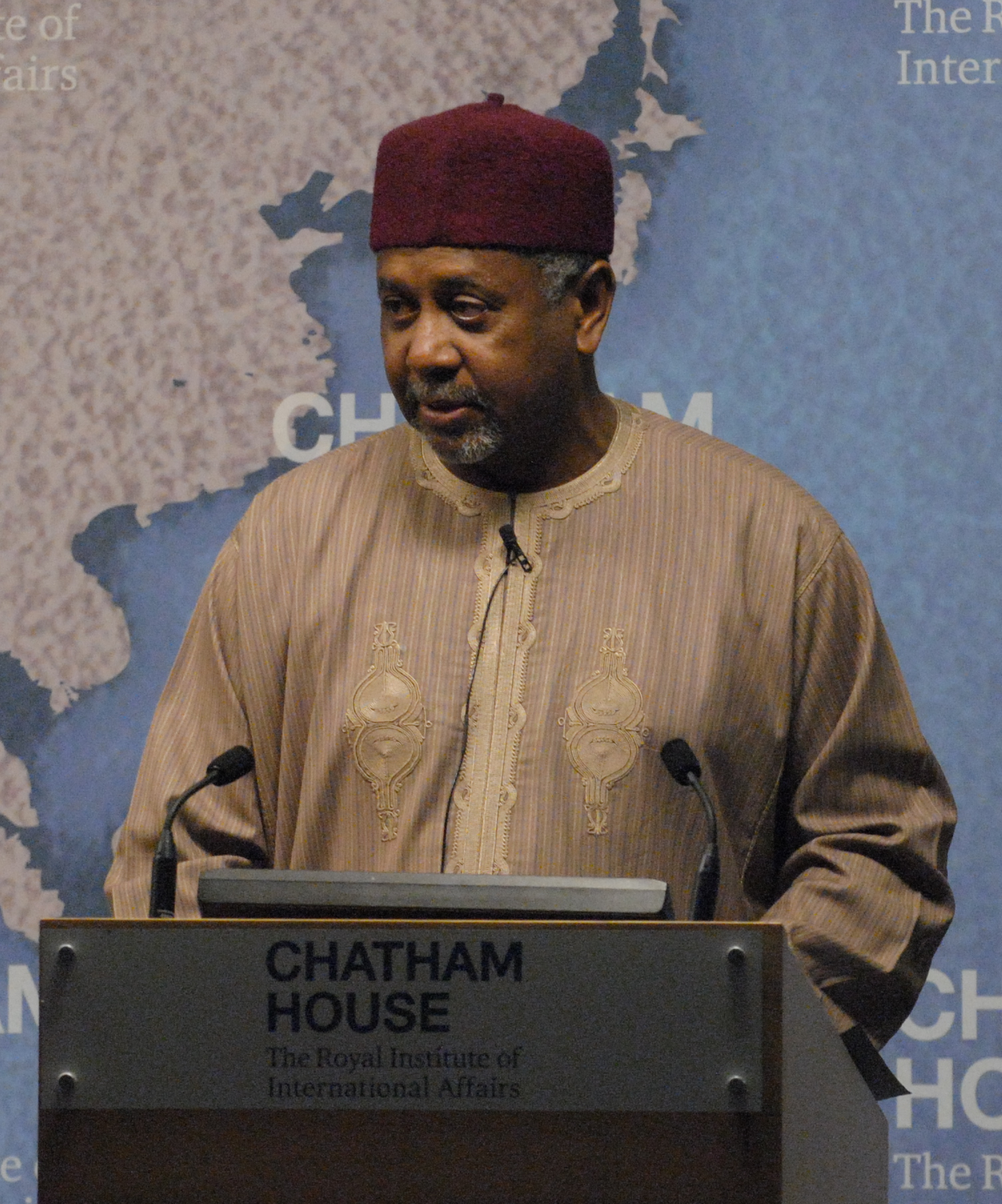
Sambo Dasuki, the National Security Adviser who allegedly masterminded the $2 billions arms deal

On 3 June 2015, Senator Ali Modu Sheriff, the former governor of Borno State was arrested by the anti-graft agency, EFCC on alleged misappropriation of 300 billion naira received from the federation account during his tenure as governor of Borno State, between 2003 and 2011. Although the investigation began in 2012 but was intensified in April 2015. Premium Times reported that Sheriff surrendered himself to the EFCC for questioning and was released on bail on 4 June 2015 according to Wilson Uwujaren, the anti-graft agency's spokesperson. Sheriff denied reports in the media that he was declared wanted, arrested and detained by the EFCC. According to Daily Post, a Nigerian newspaper, Sheriff said "I was never invited, the EFCC never said they were declaring me wanted. It was the reports in the media that attracted my attention and I paid EFCC a visit. There was nothing about N300 billion."Sanusi Lamido Sanusi, the Emir of Kano and former governor of the Central Bank of Nigeria exposed part of the illegal oil deals during the administration of President Goodluck Jonathan. He raised concern over the failure of the Nigerian National Petroleum Corporation to deposit the sum of $20 billion of oil revenues into the federation account. Diezani Alison-Madueke, the former minister of Petroleum resources named all the persons involved in the deal and others in the controversial concession of oil wells, Jide Omokore and Kola Aluko were named. Jide Omokore had volunteered to return the sum of $500 million to the federation account. In June 2015, six top officials of the Central Bank of Nigeria and 16 other employees of commercial banks were arrested by the anti-graft agency, the EFCC over 8 billion naira currency scam. They were sacked and arraigned before a Federal High Court sitting in Ibadan, Oyo State, from Tuesday, June 2, 2015, to Thursday, June 4, 2015. They were sacked and imprisoned. In June 2015, President Buhari ordered the EFCC to reopen the $182m Halliburton bribery case following a request by the Federal government of the United States. The U.S government said about $140 million recovered by the government would be repatriated to Nigeria if those involved in the scandal were arrested and prosecuted.

The $2 billion arms deal was exposed following the interim report of Buhari's investigations committee on arms procurement under the Goodluck Jonathan administration. The committee report showed extra-budgetary spending to the tune of N643.8 billion and additional spending of about $2.2 billion in the foreign currency component under the Goodluck Jonathan's watch. Preliminary investigation suggested that about $2 billion may have been disbursed for the procurement of arms to fight against Boko Haram insurgency in Nigeria. The investigative report indicated that a total sum of $2.2 billion was inexplicably disbursed into the office of the National Security Adviser in procurement of arms to fight against insurgency, but was not spent for the purpose for which the money was disbursed. Investigations on this illegal deal led to the arrest of Sambo Dasuki, the former National Security Adviser who later mentioned prominent Nigerians involved in the deal. Those who were mentioned and arrested includes Raymond Dokpesi, the Chair Emeritus of DAAR Communications Plc, Attahiru Bafarawa, the former Governor of Sokoto State, and Bashir Yuguda, the former Minister of State for Finance, Azubuike Ihejirika, the Chief of Army Staff, Adesola Nunayon Amosu, the former Chief of the Air Staff, Alex Badeh and several other politicians were mentioned.

=== Process and Industrial Developments dispute ===
Process and Industrial Developments Ltd (P&ID) entered into a 20-year contract with the Nigerian government for natural gas supply and processing. Nigeria was to provide the gas, which PI&D was to refine so that it could be used to power the Nigerian electrical grid. PI&D could keep valuable byproducts for its own use. In 2012, PI&D demanded arbitration in London, alleging that Nigeria had not supplied the agreed quantity of gas or to construct the infrastructure it had agreed to build. The arbitral tribunal awarded damages of more than £4.8 billion. The compensation was valued £8.15 billion with interest when the case was heard in London High Court in December 2022.
