= Ambrose Olutayo Somide =

Nigerian TV/Radio presenter

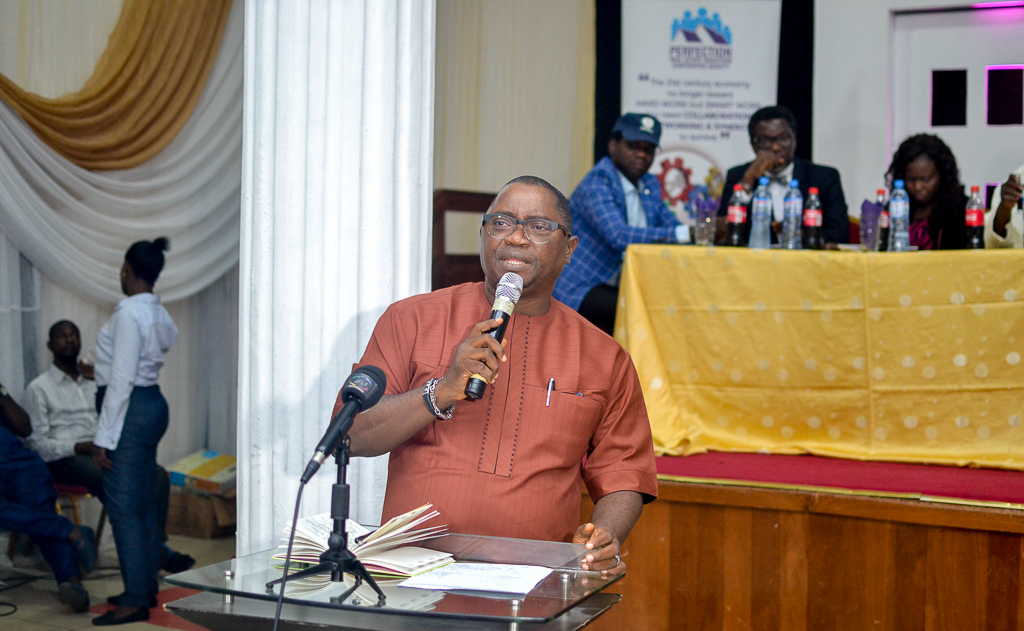
- Born: Ambrose Olutayo Somide; Abeokuta, Ogun State
- Education: University of Ife
- Presenting career
- Show: Mini jojo
- Stations: Raypower 100.5 FM; Faaji FM
- Country: Nigeria

Ambrose Olutayo Somide is a Nigerian TV/Radio presenter. He studied Urban and Regional Planning at the University of Ife (now called Obafemi Awolowo University) in Ife, Nigeria. Somide works as Managing Director Radio Services at DAAR Communications Plc (DCP) and is the originator of Faaji FM.

== Early life ==
Somide was born in Abeokuta and started primary education at Baptist Boys High School Abeokuta, Ogun state. In 1976 he secured admission into the University of Ife to study urban and regional planning. Olutayo in Modernghana.com said he loves being around women. In 1994, he joined Raypower 100.5 FM. He lost his mother in the year 2013.

== Career ==
Somide started his career in 1982, at Federal Radio Corporation of Nigeria (FRNC) Abeokuta as news accountant. After graduation from secondary school, he was made a Presenter in the same organization. In 1984, the radio station was shut down by the administration of General Muhammadu Buhari. In 1985, Olutayo moved to Ogun State Property and Investment Corporation (OPIC), Abeokuta, Ogun State, South West Nigeria, before gaining admission into the University of Ife in Ife, South West Nigeria.In 1994. Ambrose met Adisa Bashiru, his partner on Mini jojo. In 2006, he traveled to the United Kingdom to study talk show business at the BBC. Later in the year 2012, Somide started Faaji 106.5 FM, an arm of DCP.
