= Faaji FM =

Faaji 106.5 FM
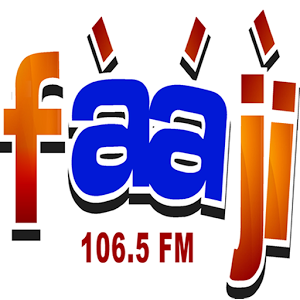
- Lagos; Nigeria
- Frequency: 106.5 MHz

Ownership
- Owner: DAAR Communications Plc
- Sister stations: Raypower 100.5 FM

History
- First air date: December 1, 2012

Faaji 106.5 FM is a Nigerian radio station. It is owned by Daar Communications, a communication firm founded by Raymond Dokpesi. Faaji FM officially started full transmission on December 1, 2012, with Managing Director radio services DAAR Communications, Kenny Ogungbe kicking off the transmission.

== See also ==
- Agidigbo Fm 88.7, Ibadan
