= $2 billion arms deal =

Arms procurement deal in Nigeria

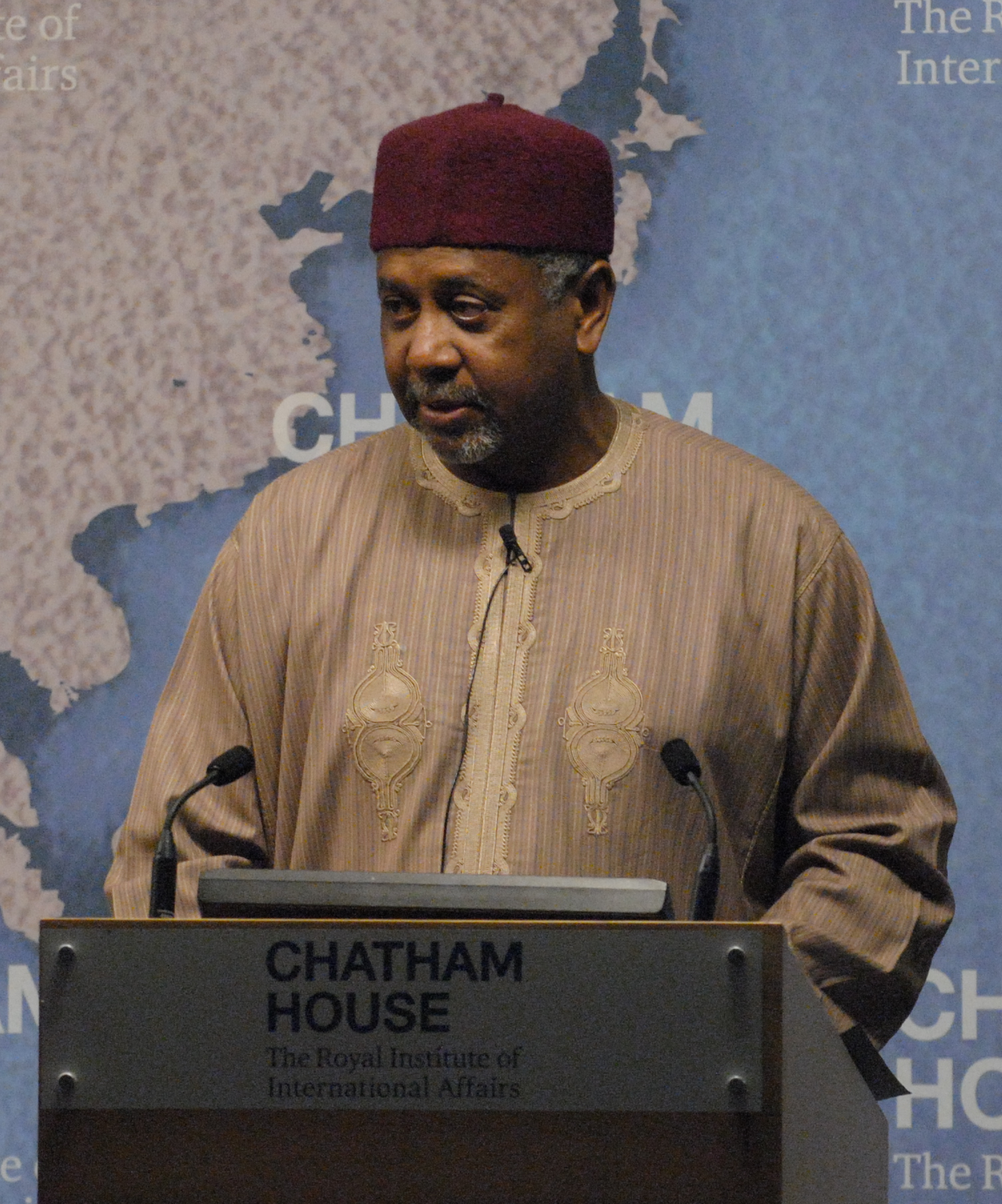
Sambo Dasuki, the National Security Adviser who allegedly masterminded the $2 billion arms deal

The $2 billion arms deal, or Dasukigate, is an arms procurement deal in Nigeria that resulted in the embezzlement of $2 billion through the office of the National Security Adviser under the leadership of Colonel Sambo Dasuki, the former National Security Adviser. The illegal deal was revealed following an interim report of the presidential investigations committee on arms procurement under the Goodluck Jonathan administration. The committee report showed an extra-budgetary spending to the tune of ₦643.8 billion and additional spending of about $2.2 billion in the foreign currency component under the Goodluck Jonathan administration.

A preliminary investigation suggested that about $2 billion may have been disbursed for the procurement of arms to fight against Islamic insurgencies in Nigeria. The investigative report indicated that a total sum of $2.2 billion was inexplicably disbursed into the office of the National Security Adviser in procurement of arms to fight against insurgency but was not spent for that purpose. Several reports suggested that part of the disbursed fund was diverted for the sponsoring of the re-election of Goodluck Jonathan, the former President of Nigeria.

Investigations into this deal led to the arrest of Shaibu Salisu, a former director of finance in the office of the National Security Adviser. He was arrested by the Department of State Security Services. After interrogations, he claimed to have acted on Colonel Dasuki's order. Colonel Dasuki was arrested on 1 December 2015 by the Department of State Security Services and transferred to the Economic and Financial Crimes Commission (EFCC) for further interrogation. In a written statement, he mentioned several notable Nigerians who were involved in the arms procurement deal. Chief Raymond Dokpesi, the chair emeritus of DAAR Communications, was mentioned in connection with the deal alongside Attahiru Bafarawa, the former Governor of Sokoto State, and Bashir Yuguda, the former Minister of State for Finance.

After 276 schoolgirls were kidnapped in Chibok by the Boko Haram in April 2014, the following month, Marion Ford, an American living in Prague, the Czech Republic, was approached about procuring arms for the Nigerian army to fight the Islamic insurgent group. At that time, Ford did not have the necessary licenses to trade in arms, so he signed an agency agreement with and negotiated for arms dealer Ara Dolarian and his company DCI, based out of Fresno, California, and Sofia, Bulgaria. Dolarian was charged and arrested on 15 May 2019 because the US Department of State had not given his company the compulsory international arms deal brokering licenses required for contracts signed with NSA vendor Societe d'Equipmente Internationaux in 2014.However, the High Court of Nigeria in August 2022 found Societe d'Equipmente Internationaux innocent of charges and returned all frozen assets held by the EFCC.

== Investigative committee ==
The arms procurement investigative committee was inaugurated on 31 August 2015 by President Muhammadu Buhari to investigate the procurement of ammunition to fight insurgencies during the administration of Goodluck Jonathan. The report revealed extra-budgetary spending to the tune of ₦643.8 billion and spending of about $2.2 billion in the foreign currency component under the Goodluck Jonathan administration. This amount excluded grants received by the state governments and funds received by the Directorate of State Services and the Nigerian Police Force.

The committee analyzed how funds were transferred to the offices of the National Security Adviser and the Nigerian Armed Forces in local and foreign currencies. It observed that about $2.2 billion was disbursed for the procurement of ammunition to tackle insurgency but regretted that little was spent for the procurement of the arms. The committee discovered that out of the 513 contracts awarded at $8,356,525,184.32, ₦2,189,265,724,404.55 and €54,000.00, about 53 were failed contracts amounting to about $2,378,939,066.27 and ₦13,729,342,329.87, respectively. The amount of foreign currency spent on failed contracts was more than twice the $1 billion loan approved by the National Assembly for borrowing from the World Bank to fight insurgencies. The investigative committee discovered a total transfer of ₦3.850 billion to a single company by Colonel Dasuki, the former National Security Adviser. These transactions were made with neither agreements nor the fulfilment of tax obligations to the Federal Government of Nigeria.

Further investigation by the committee provided evidence that fictitious contracts to the tune of ₦2,219,188,609.50 and £9,905,477.00 were awarded between March 2012 and March 2015 by Colonel Dasuki. The funds disbursed for the purchase of 12 helicopters, 4 Alpha Jets, bombs, and other ammunition were not used for those purposes. The committee also noted that Dasuki directed the Central Bank of Nigeria (CBN) to transfer a total sum of $132,050,486.97 and £9,905,473.50 to the accounts of the Societe D'equipmente Internationaux in West Africa, the UK, and the US with no documentation.

Subsequent to this interim report, President Buhari ordered the arrest of Colonel Dasuki for the alleged siphoning of billions of dollars allocated for the procurement of arms. He also ordered the arrest of all those indicted.

== Probing and prosecutions ==
Several notable Nigerians were involved in the arms procurement deals, including Chief Raymond Dopesi, the chair emeritus of DAAR Communications PLC, alongside Attahiru Bafarawa, the former Governor of Sokoto State, and Bashir Yuguda, the former Minister of State for Finance. Sambo Dasuki masterminded the arms procurement deal.

On 19 July 2015, the operator of the Department of State Security Service stormed his residence in Abuja and confiscated his international passport. He was charged with unlawful possession of firearms and foreign currencies. On 3 November 2015, Justice Adeniyi Ademola ordered the DSS to release his passport to enable him to travel for medical attention. Despite this, the DSS prevented him from traveling abroad by putting him under house arrest.

On 17 November 2015, President Buhari ordered the arrest of Colonel Dasuki for alleged siphoning of arms procurement funds. Dasuki claimed that ordering his arrest by the President is illegal. He denied that he was invited by the investigation committee on issues related to arms procurement. According to Premium Times, Dansuki said, "I have never been invited formally or informally to appear before the panel."

On 30 November 2015, Ambassador Bashir Yuguda was arrested and detained by the Economic and Financial Crimes Commission (EFCC) in connection with the arms procurement deal mentioned by Colonel Dasuki. He was arrested alongside Chief Raymond Dokpesi, Alhaji Attahiru Bafarawa, and his son. Preliminary evidence showed that Ambassador Yuguda received ₦1.5 billion from the National Security Adviser with no coherent basis for the financial transaction. The money was transferred into his account through an unknown company. The transfers were made between December 2014 and May 2015. An additional ₦1.275 billion was also transferred to his account during the campaign for the 2015 Nigerian general election. Also, ₦775 million was transferred into his account from the office of the Accountant-General of the Federation. Shaibu Salisu was arrested in connection with the arms procurement deal. Investigations reveal that Salisu operates a joint account with Sambo Dasuki. According to Thisday, EFCC operatives said, "We just discovered a huge sum of money in foreign currencies in a joint account [...]. He is also being interrogated by EFCC operatives." Salisu's statements led to Dasuki's arrest. The investigation revealed a payment of ₦650 million into the account of Nduka Obaigbena. He denied receiving any money from the Office of the National Security Adviser.

On 1 December 2015, Colonel Dasuki was arrested by the Department of State Security Services and transferred to the EFCC for further interrogation.

Prior to Dasuki's arrest, Shaibu Salisu was arrested by the Department of State Security Services, and following interrogations, he claimed to have acted on Colonel Dasuki's order, which led to Dasuki's arrest. After Dasuki was transferred to the EFCC, he initially decided not to comment on the issue or write any statement, claiming that he had been subjected to a media trial. The EFCC operatives then issued Dasuki a copy of the statement made by Shaibu Salisu. According to The Nation, Colonel Dasuki said, "You mean Salisu wrote all these! You mean he said these! Give me a pen and paper." Dasuki gave a list of people involved in the deal. He mentioned Chief Raymond Dopesi, the chair emeritus of DAAR Communications, alongside Attahiru Bafarawa and Bashir Yuguda. Chief Raymond Dopesi was arrested at his residence in Abuja by the EFCC in connection with the arms procurement deal mentioned by Colonel Dasuki. Preliminary evidence showed that Chief Dopesi received ₦2.1 billion between October 2014 and March 2015 from the office of the National Security Adviser with no coherent reasons for the financial transaction. Chief Dopesi said that the ₦2.1 billion received from the Office of the National Security Adviser was payment for media and political campaigns for the re-election of President Goodluck Jonathan.

Dokpesi pleaded not guilty to the charges and requested that the court grant him bail on liberal terms. The case was adjourned until 10 December 2015. The presiding judge, Justice Gabriel Kolawole, ordered the EFCC to detain him. He slated 17 February, 18 February, 2 March, and 3 March 2016 to commence the hearing on the six-count charges against him. Prior to the arms procurement saga, Chief Dokpesi and Africa Independent Television were accused of being partisans for airing the 2015 movie The Lion of Bourdillon, which Chief Bola Tinubu considered defamatory. This documentary led to a ₦150 billion libel suit against AIT by Chief Bola Tinubu.

On 1 December 2015, Attahiru Bafarawa, the former Governor of Sokoto State, was arrested and detained by the EFCC in connection with the arms procurement deal mentioned by Colonel Dasuki. He was arrested alongside Dokpesi. Evidence showed that Attahiru Bafarawa received ₦4.6 billion from the office of the National Security Adviser with no clear basis for the financial transaction. In response to the allegation, Bafarawa said he received the money from the Office of the National Security Adviser for spiritual purposes.

On 8 December 2015, Chief Dokpesi was arraigned by the Federal Government of Nigeria before a federal high court sitting in Abuja on six counts of money laundering and other financial crimes. The prosecutor maintained that the transfer of a total sum of ₦2.1 billion between October 2014 and March 2015 from the office of the National Security Adviser breaches Section 58(4)(b) of the Public Procurement Act 2007 and is punishable under Sections 58(6) and (7) of the same Act, as well as under Section 17(b) of the EFCC Act, 2004. The family of Bafawara, in a statement signed by Alhaji Yusuf Dingyadi, advised the EFCC to charge Bafawara and his son to court if there is evidence against them rather than keeping them in their custody. According to Thisday, the family of Bafawara said:

Today is one week since Bafarawa was detained by the EFCC. And today marks two weeks that his son Sagir Bafarawa has been in detention. Why are they being detained without charges? If the EFCC has any evidence that they have committed any crime it should charge them to court. We thought that the era of detaining people while searching for evidence was over. We call on the EFCC to release them forthwith if they have nothing against them.

On 12 December 2015, the management of Thisday denied receiving money related to arms procurement from the former National Security Adviser. The management, in its response to an invitation letter from the EFCC dated 8 November 2015, received in its Abuja office on 8 December 2015, said that all of the funds that were received from the Office of the National Security Adviser "are payments for compensation to mitigate the dastardly Boko Haram twin bombings of the ThisDay Newspapers offices in Abuja and Kaduna on Thursday April 26, 2012".

On 14 December 2015, the EFCC arraigned Colonel Dasuki, Bafarawa, Saliu Atawodi, Dokpesi, Yuguda, Salisu, Sagir Attahiru, Dahaltu Investment Limited, Aminu Baba-Kusa, former executive director of the Nigerian National Petroleum Corporation, and his companies Acacia Holding Limited and Reliance Referral Hospital Limited before Justice Hussein Baba Yusuf of Abuja High Court sitting at Maitama on allegations of unlawful diversion of public funds. Justice Gabriel Kolawole ruled that Chief Dokpesi should be granted bail in the sum of ₦400 million with two sureties in the same sum. He maintains that Dokpesi should remain in Kuje Prison until the bail conditions are met. He also ordered the EFCC not to re-arrest him after the bail for interrogation lasted for more than 8 hours and 30 minutes.

== Accusations and counter-accusations ==
Evidence recovered by authorities led to the recovery of stolen money by citizens, some of whom claim not to have known that the money given to them was the proceeds of shady and illegal dealings. A committee set up to probe contracts awarded by the Office of the National Security Adviser (ONSA) from 2011 to 2015 indicted more than 300 companies and citizens, including serving and retired officers of the armed forces. A statement issued by a presidential spokesman said over ₦7 billion had been recovered from indicted companies and individuals, and another ₦41 billion is to be refunded by several indicted companies. Several top officials were also said to have returned ₦1.4 billion a week after the statement was released.

While speaking in Washington, D.C., on "Presidential elections and democratic consolidation in Africa: Case studies on Nigeria and Tanzania", a forum co-hosted by the National Democratic Institute for International Affairs and the Center for Strategic and International Studies, Goodluck Jonathan refuted the allegations by the EFCC and its operative that he awarded a contract potentially worth $2 billion for arms procurement during his administration. He said, "Where did the money come from? I did not award any $2 billion contract for procurement of weapons." But evidence gathered by relevant Nigerian and foreign authorities led to the belief that the president was not entirely truthful in his assessments. The ex-president failed to respond to the exact amount that was appropriated to the NSA for the discharge of their duties. He admitted that "there were some issues" and that some of them were overblown. Analysts have said that the statement of former President Jonathan is evasive and ambiguous because such evasive denial is taken as admission.

Following the former President's statement, publicity Secretary of the All Progressives Congress Joe Igbokwe faulted the former president, saying he should not be taken seriously, while a former acting Secretary of the PDP, Chief Remi Akitoye, said Jonathan merely expressed his opinion but called on security agencies to investigate the matter. The second Vice President of the Nigerian Bar Association, NBA, Mr. Monday Ubani, suggested, "That is why some of us are of the opinion that if some of Jonathan's men have been mentioned in the course of investigation, the best thing for the EFCC to do is invite him to come and make useful statements. Since he is saying that Dasuki did not commit the offence, he can be invited to say all he knows to the authorities."

== Confessional statements ==
Several confessional statements help in the investigation of the arms procurement deal. Salisu, who operated a joint bank account with Dasuki, claimed to have withdrawn $47 million from the Central Bank of Nigeria; the money was delivered in 11 briefcases to Dasuki at his residence. Salisu's statement reads:

I could remember on the 20/11/2014, I was directed by the NSA, M.S. Dasuki to go to the CBN and collect the sum of $47m in cash and the balance in Euro and the directive was obeyed and the monies were delivered to the NSA in about 11 suit cases. I acknowledged the receipt of the money from the CBN which was handed over to M.S. Dasuki. I did not benefit even one cent. The request for the funds was tag(sic) Special Services signed by the NSA, M.S. Dasuki, addressed to the Governor of CBN. I did not know the source of the money into our CBN Account. The foreign currencies that I collected from the CBN were delivered to the NSA in his house, No. 13, John Kadiya Street, Asokoro.

Ambassador Yuguda claimed to have delivered a sum of ₦600 million to six chairmen of the National Working Committee, the Contact and Mobilisation Committee of the People's Democratic Party for the 2015 general election. According to him, the beneficiaries includes Yerima Abdullahi, Chief Bode George, Peter Odili, Jim Nwobodo, Attahiru Bafarawa, and Ahmadu Ali. He transferred ₦300 million to BAM Properties, whose account details were sent to him by Bello Haliru, a former National Chairman of the People's Democratic Party. He also claimed to have sent ₦200 million to Bello Sarkin Yaki, the Governorship aspirant in Kebbi State. According to him, Mahmud Shinkafi, the former Governor of Zamfara State, received ₦100 million.

Bashir's confessional statement reads:

For the cash disbursement of ₦600million, it was meant for the six zonal chairmen for Contact and Mobilisation Committees for Election of 2015. The chairmen are Bode George, Amb. Yerima Abdullahi; Peter Odili; Attahiru Bafarawa; Jim Nwobodo; Ahmadu Ali. The sum of ₦100million was given to each chairman. I gave the money in company of Prof. Alkali, who was Political Adviser to former president. The zonal chairmen are for the Peoples Democratic Party(PDP). I also instructed Jabbama Limited to transfer the sum of N100m to Dalhatu Limited on the request of Attahiru Bafarawa. I also remember that Bello Sarkin Yaki was among the people that the then NSA instructed that I send the sum of N200million to. He was the PDP gubernatorial candidate in Kebbi State. I knew the chairman of Stallion Limited whose second name I cannot remember. Between December 2014 to June 2015, on the instruction of the then NSA, I introduced Jabbama Limited to a staff of the company on the instruction of the chairman. When the account was in credit, disbursement was made from time to time on the instruction of the then NSA. Part in foreign exchange or transfers. I wish to add that sometime in February 2015, I instructed Jabbama to transfer the sum of N300m to BAM Properties. The account was given to me by Bello Haliru as one of the people the former NSA requested me to give money. I also remember that Mahmud Aliyu Shinkafi was sent the sum of N100million on the instruction of the then NSA. Further to my statement of 30th November, 2015, I have brought the sum of $829,800(equivalent to N200m) and N600m was given to me to distribute to the six PDP Zonal Committee chairmen. I don't know who are the directors of Dalhatu Investment Limited but funds were transferred to the company's account on the instruction of Dalhatu Bafarawa for the total amount of N1.5billion received from the then NSA by Jabbama Limited. I shall endeavour to recover the sum of N600million given to the six zonal PDP committee chairmen, while I appeal to the commission to use their machineries to trace the remaining balance of the money transferred to various accounts.

In a counterclaim, Chief Bode George denied the allegations of receiving a total sum of ₦100 million from Yuguda for the 2015 general election. He described the claim by Yuguda as "mischievous and deliberately fraudulent". Bode's statement reads:

My attention has been drawn to another mischievous and deliberately fraudulent claim that I collected N100 million from Bashir Yuguda, the former Minister of State for Finance. This is another blatant falsehood, stripped of any iota of truth. This is yet again a depraved continuation of lynch mob journalism orchestrated by an online newspaper. The salient fact is that very early this year, long before the election period, the party set up Contact and Mobilization Committee for each zone to reconcile various factions and ensure a firm unity of purpose within the zones before the election. I was elected as the chairman for the South-West zone. The committee which was made up of 18 senior members of the party with distinguished history of honour and exemplary leadership, met at least 10 times in my office in Lagos. These people travelled all the way from every corner of the South-West, with three members representing each state. All of them are very much alive to testify to my assertions. Sometime in the middle of these deliberations, Yuguda came to me and said the party was reimbursing the 18 elders of the committee for their transportation, accommodation and feeding allowance for the work that was done. The committee later submitted the report of its deliberations to the party and then wound up. For all these efforts Yuguda gave the committee only $30,000. That was less than N6 million at that time. Yuguda can never claim that he gave the Committee N100 million. That is the figment of the imagination of rascally scribblers purporting to be journalists. Again, facts are sacred.

Nigeria's former minister of state for defence, Musiliu Obanikoro, also explained how he paid a former governor of Ekiti State, Ayo Fayose, $5 million (about ₦1.8 billion) from the funds meant for the purchase of arms when interrogated by authorities.
