= Oriyomi (name) =

- Gender: Male
- Language: Yoruba

Origin
- Origin: Nigeria
- Meaning: The head saved me
- Region of origin: Southwestern Nigeria

Oriyomi audio is male given name of Yoruba origin from the southwestern part of Nigeria. Which means (The head saved me).

== Notable people bearing the name ==
- Oriyomi Hamzat, Nigerian journalist.
