= Okupe =

Okupe is a surname occurring in Nigeria. Notable people with the surname include:

- Doyin Okupe (1952–2025), Nigerian physician and politician
