= Olalekan Fabilola =

Yoruba language educator and show host

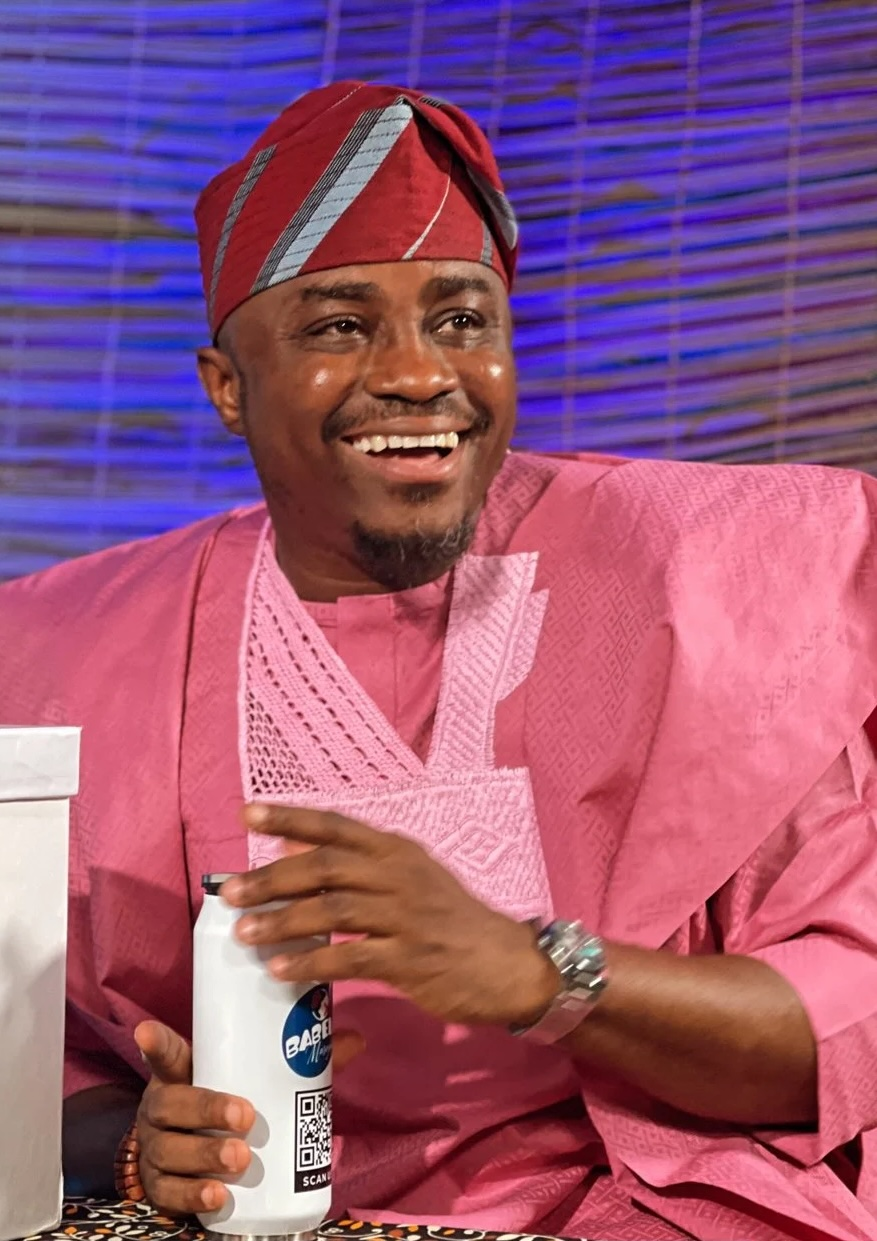
- Olalekan Fabilola on the set of Masoyinbo game show.
- Born: Ọba Ile, Akurẹ, Ondo State, Nigeria
- Education: Covenant University

Olalekan Maxwell Fabilola is a Nigerian cultural entrepreneur, Yoruba language educator, author, and internet personality best known as the creator and host of Másọ̀yìnbó, a Yoruba-language game show.

== Early life and education ==
Fabilola was born in Ọba Ile, Akurẹ, Ondo State, Nigeria, into a Yoruba-speaking family. He credits his deep appreciation of Yoruba culture to his father, who was a traditional chief in Ọba Ile, while his mother taught him to correctly write and pronounce Yoruba words with tone marks (àmì).

Fabilola attended Covenant University, where he earned a Bachelor of Science degree in computer science. For his final year project at Covenant, he created a program that provided translations of 500 Yoruba proverbs between Yoruba and English languages. This project was recognized as one of the best in his department and was showcased during the 2008 convocation. Fabilola later published the work as The Ancient Wisdom—Òwe Yorùbá, a compilation of 500 Yoruba proverbs with English translations and extensive explanations.

== Career ==
=== EAYoruba ===
In 2021, Fabilola founded EAYoruba.com, an online platform dedicated to teaching Yoruba language and culture. Through the platform, he offers live virtual classes on Yoruba language for private and group learning, as well as creates educational content distributed via Instagram and Facebook.

=== Masoyinbo ===
In 2024, Fabilola created and launched Másọ̀yìnbó (meaning "Do not Speak English"), a Yoruba-language game show that has become his most recognized work. The show, which started initially under the name Bàbẹ́là Yorùbá, features contestants who must answer ten progressively challenging questions entirely in Yoruba without using any English words. Each slip into English words and incorrect response results in a deduction from the 1 million Naira prize which came with a car reward. The show is distributed primarily through social media platforms including YouTube, Instagram, and Facebook, making it accessible to a global audience. As of December 2025, the EAYoruba YouTube channel has accumulated more than 220,000 subscribers and ran some 240 episodes.

Guests who have appeared on the show include Nigerian celebrities such as Alibaba Akpobome, Saheed Osupa, Funke Akindele, Femi Adebayo, Falz, Taaooma, Lateef Adedimeji, Jide Awobona, Oriyomi Hamzat, Omoyele Sowore, Àròjinlẹ̀ and Eniola Ajao. As of 2025, only two contestants—Yoruba chanter and actor, Ajóbíewé; and Fuji artist, Saheed Osupa—have successfully answered nearly all ten questions correctly, even though both used some English words and did not win the full prize amount. From time to time, the game show is also hosted live in different cities, from which two highest scorers have walked away with the car star prize in additional to their monetary winnings.

== Cultural impact and recognition ==
Fabilola describes his motivation by stating: "I have been doing Yoruba since I became aware of myself. I love Yoruba. I used my pocket money to promote Yoruba. I went into debt doing Yoruba. I came out of debt teaching Yoruba." Fabilola has stated that the Masoyinbo show aims to address an "identity inferiority complex" among Yoruba speakers, particularly among educated elites, and aims to make speaking Yoruba fashionable for all generations.

According to The Africa Report, Masoyinbo has reignited family television viewing traditions, with families including children and grandparents watching together and learning from the program. Writing in The Nation, a columnist noted that Fabilola's work represents more than entertainment, describing it as "a cultural gift" that encourages pride in the Yoruba language. The show has been credited with preserving Yoruba heritage, challenging assumptions about indigenous languages and demonstrating that Yoruba is capable of bearing intellectual weight in formal discourse.

In June 2025, Fabilola received an honorary award from television couple Mr. and Mrs. Kogberegbe, who serve as Creative Directors of the Dallas International Yoruba Movie Awards (DIYMA), in recognition of his efforts in preserving and promoting Yoruba language and culture. For pioneering the Màsọ̀yìnbó show, Fabilola was also the winner of the Media Visionary of the Year at the Master of Industry Awards 2025.
