= Aderemi Abasi Oseni =

Nigerian politician

Aderemi Abasi Oseni is a Nigerian politician and a member of the Nigerian House of Representatives. He represents the Ibarapa East/Ido Federal Constituency in Oyo State.
