= Ibarapa East =

- LGA
- Interactive map of Ibarapa East
- Country: Nigeria
- State: Oyo State
- Headquarter: Eruwa

Government
  - Local Government Chairman and the Head of the Local Government Council: Aderemi Abasi Oseni
  - House of Representatives member: Honorable Kazeem Arogundade (PDP)

Area
  - Total: 838 km^{2} (324 sq mi)

Population (2006)
  - Total: 118,226
  - Density: 141/km^{2} (365/sq mi)
- Time zone: UTC+1 (WAT)
- Postal code: 201

Ibarapa East is a Local Government Area in Oyo State, Nigeria, made up of the Ibarapa people. Its headquarters are in the town of Eruwa.

It has an area of 838 km^{2} and a population of 118,226 at the 2006 census.

The postal code of the area is 201.

== History ==
Ibarapa East Local Government with its headquarters at Eruwa was established 1989. It covers an area of 705.78 km^{2} (272.50 sq mi) of land with the estimated population of over 120,220 according to 2006 Census figure. The Local Government is classified as sub urban Local Government. It is bounded in the West by Ibarapa Central Local Government, in the East by Ido Local Government while it’s bounded in the North and South by Iseyin and Odeda Local Government in Ogun state.

== Demographics ==
The Local Government consists of multi-ethnic nationalities; though predominantly Yorubas, the presence of other nationalities is equally felt in the Local Government Area such as Fulanis, Igbos, TIVs, Jukuns among others.

== Economy ==
The economic life of the Local Government is dependent on Agriculture. The Local Government Area has admirable tropical climate which favours the growth of both food and cash crops. The agricultural sector provides income and employment opportunities for over seventy-five (75) percent of the populace. As a result of this, the Local Government encourages and facilitates agricultural empowerment and developmental initiatives. This explains why the area is a hub to so many Agro-Allied investments. Among the agro-allied companies located in the area are:- Nico Oil Palm Plantation, Zartech, Global-West, Obasanjo farms among others. Aside this, the Local Government is housing two institutions of higher learning namely; Adeseun Ogundoyin Polytechnic, Eruwa and Oyo State College of Education, Lanlate.

Other mercantile activities noticeable among the people of the area include trading and cloth weaving.

== Villages ==
The Local Government has towns and villages among which are: Eruwa, Lanlate, Okolo, Maya, Temidire, Idi-Ope, Adeagbo, Elere, Onirope, Akete, Obanese, Alapa, Lagaye, Abule Baale, Ijesa, Babamogba etc. Currently, Ibarapa East is having ten (10) Political wards.
