= Ohimai Amaize =

Nigerian journalist and author

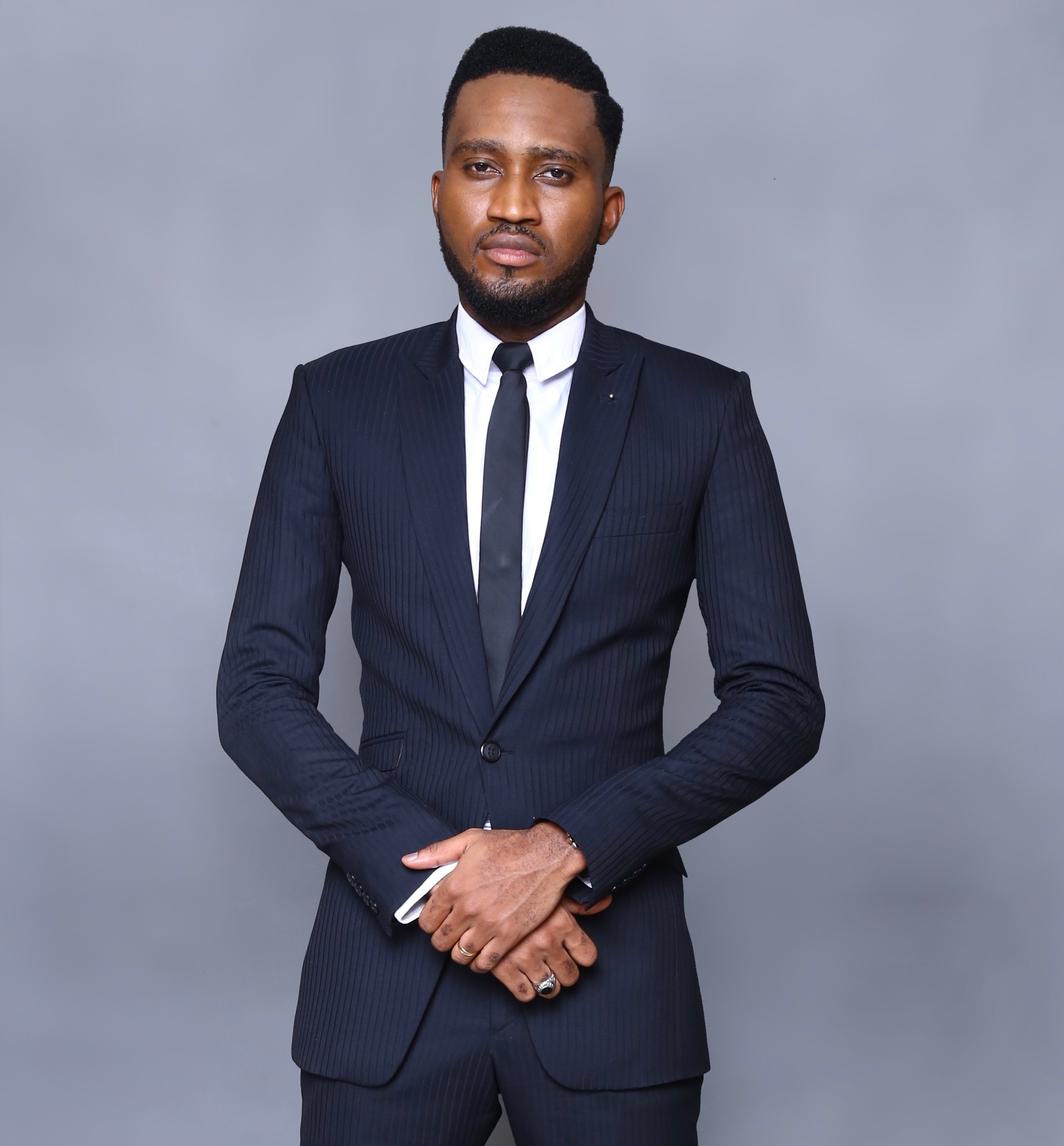
- Born: 9 September 1984 (age 41); Uromi, Edo State, Nigeria
- Education: Columbia University
- Occupation: Journalist
- Known for: Journalism
- Spouse: Tessy Oliseh-Amaize (m. 2014)

Ohimai Amaize (born 9 September 1984) is a Nigerian journalist with a multi-sectoral background that spans anti-corruption, youth advocacy, civil society, political campaigns, brand development, communications strategy and governance.

He was producer and anchor of Kakaaki Social – a popular social media news program on Africa Independent Television (AIT) – Nigeria's largest privately owned television network. In June 2019, Amaize fled Nigeria to exile in the United States following threats of arrest for treason by the Nigerian government for his journalistic work as a TV anchor. In January 2020, he was granted asylum in the United States. Amaize graduated from Columbia University with a Master of Arts in Political Reporting on 26 August 2021. His writings have appeared on local and international platforms like Premium Times, Sahara Reporters, Slate and JSTOR Daily.

== Education and early career ==
In 2007, he graduated with a Bachelor of Arts degree in English and French (Combined Honours) from the University of Ibadan, Nigeria where he was elected President of the institution's umbrella body for campus journalists - the Union of Campus Journalists (UCJ) in 2006. Later in 2009, he earned a Post-Graduate Certificate in Managing for Integrity at the Central European University, Budapest, Hungary.

His professional career began in 2007 at the Economic and Financial Crimes Commission (EFCC), before moving to Lagos-based ad agency, ADSTRAT BMC a year after.

In May 2009, he took on a new challenge as Research Assistant to pioneer Executive Chairman of EFCC, Mallam Nuhu Ribadu.

Amaize is a recipient of the Columbia University Scholarship for Displaced Students (CUSDS) – the "first-ever Columbia-wide scholarship, and the world's first scholarship of its kind.” A He is one of 18 students from around the world selected into the inaugural cohort, from over 1,200 applicants.

== Advocacy ==
Amaize is a voluntary adviser to numerous youth-led non-profit initiatives, including work in the EFCC's Popular Culture Programme under the commission's former Fix Nigeria Initiative department and later under the commission's Strategy and Re-orientation Unit (SARU).

In October 2008, he became an ambassador, Microsoft Internet Safety, Security and Privacy Initiative for Nigeria (MISSPIN). One of the major highlights of his work with the organization was B.L.I.N.G. (Brilliant. Legitimate. Inspired. Nigerian. Great), a pop-culture strategy with which he assembled some of Nigeria's top music artistes to produce the song/music video – "Maga No Need Pay" – Nigeria's first ever music collaboration against cyber-crimes.

Produced by legendary producer Cobhams Asuquo, "Maga No Need Pay" featured Banky W, Omawumi, Rooftop MCs, Bez Idakula, Modele, Wordsmith and MI Abaga.

== Politics and governance ==
Described by Nigeria's Y! Magazine as "The Fixer", in August 2010, he became the youngest presidential campaign manager (26) in modern democratic history when popular journalist Dele Momodu appointed him to head his campaign ahead of the 2011 polls.

From September 2011 to May 2012, he served as Special Advisor on Advocacy to Mallam Bolaji Abdullahi then Nigeria's Minister of Youth Development. When Abdullahi was appointed Minister of Sports, he followed his boss and became the Minister's Advisor on Youth, School and Grassroots Sports till March 2014.

From April to October 2014, he was Special Advisor on Media Strategy to Senator Musiliu Obanikoro, as Minister of State for Defence and later for Foreign Affairs until May 29, 2015.

In October 2015, Amaize took a break from politics announcing his disengagement from partisan politics with his exit from the Peoples Democratic Party (PDP).

== Television/broadcasting ==
In August 2018, Africa Independent Television (AIT) announced that Ohimai Amaize and Osasu Igbinedion will be hosts of The Weekend Show - a live TV show that focuses on politics, lifestyle and entertainment. The show aired for two hours on Saturdays and Sundays.

Also, in August 2018, Amaize joined popular daily breakfast television program Kakaaki as a presenter and helped launch the popular Kakaaki Social segment – a 20-minute social media daily news program airing between 8am and 8.20am.

In June 2019, Amaize fled Nigeria over ongoing threats of arrest for presenting the government critical Kakaaki Social on Africa Independent Television.

== Works ==
Amaize is the author of the book - Fighting Lions: The Untold Story of Dele Momodu’s Presidential Campaign which details his account as Nigeria's youngest presidential campaign manager.

== Other engagements ==
In November 2012, he was appointed secretary of the Board of the Nigeria Academicals Sports Committee (NASCOM). In this capacity, he helped create the Rhythm N’ Play campaign – a grassroots sports mobilization campaign targeted at bringing an additional 2 million Nigerian school children into sports within a period of two years. Former President Goodluck Ebele Jonathan launched the campaign in Abuja in June 2013.

Amaize was tasked by Holyhill Church, Abuja to pioneer The Underground – Nigeria's first-ever Christian Nightclub – a specialized outreach ministry for ‘unchurched’ youths.

In June 2016, Amaize was appointed Coordinator of Ghana At Work – a project that documented development in Ghana.

== The Signal ==
He is the founder and publisher of online newspaper, Signal. Most famously, Signal has reported exclusively on: the expensive lifestyle of Nigeria's first family – the Buharis; the inside story of the power tussle between Aisha Buhari and a political cabal inside the Aso Rock Presidential Villa; in 2016, broke news of the death of Diepreye Solomon Peter Alamieyeseigha, the first elected governor of Nigeria's southern Bayelsa state.

== Awards and recognitions ==
Amaize was nominated in the Excellence in Service (Public Service) category of The Future Awards for 2012. In 2013, he was honoured by The Future Project as one of the Best 100 Young Nigerians in one of the events to mark Nigeria's 100th anniversary as a nation.

== Personal life ==
On April 26, 2014, Amaize married his heartthrob, Tessy Oliseh, an award-winning fashion designer and alumnus of Middlesex University, United Kingdom and the younger sister to Nigerian football legend, Sunday Oliseh.
