= Doyin Okupe =

Nigerian physician and politician (1952–2025)

Personal details
- Born: Adedoyin Ajibike Okupe; 22 March 1952 Iperu, Colony and Protectorate of Nigeria
- Died: 7 March 2025 (aged 72) Lagos, Nigeria
- Party: Labour Party (previously: PDP, NPN, NRC, UNCP, and Accord Party)
- Spouse: Aduralere Okupe
- Children: 9
- Parent: Chief Matthew Adekoya Okupe (father)
- Education: Igbobi College, University of Ibadan
- Occupation: Physician and politician
- Known for: Co-founder of Royal Cross Medical Centre, National Publicity Secretary of NRC, Special Assistant to President Olusegun Obasanjo and Senior Special Assistant to President Goodluck Jonathan

Adedoyin Ajibike Okupe (22 March 1952 – 7 March 2025), better known as Doyin Okupe, was a Nigerian physician and politician who co-founded Royal Cross Medical Centre and was the National Publicity Secretary of National Republican Convention (NRC). He was once detained under General Sani Abacha, and subsequently disqualified from participating in United Nigeria Congress Party (UNCP) primaries; later on, he was a governorship aspirant of the People's Democratic Party (PDP) in Ogun State. Okupe was Special Assistant on Media and Publicity to President Olusegun Obasanjo and Senior Special Assistant on Public Affairs to President Goodluck Jonathan.

== Background ==
Born on 22 March 1952 in Iperu, now in Ogun State, in British-ruled Nigeria, Okupe was the son of Chief Matthew Adekoya Okupe, who was a banker with Agbonmagbe Bank. His brothers were Kunle Okupe, Owo Okupe, Wemi Okupe and Larry Okupe, and his sisters are Aina Okanlawon and Bisola Ayeni. He attended St. Jude's School in Ebute Metta, Lagos, Igbobi College in Yaba, Lagos and the University of Ibadan in Ibadan, Oyo State.

== Career ==
=== Medical career ===
Okupe worked for some years for government and private hospitals, including St. Nicholas Hospital, Lagos, before establishing the Royal Cross Medical Centre (also known as Royal Cross Hospital) in Obalende, Lagos, along with his colleagues, Seyi Roberts and Ladi Okuboyejo. He was the Managing Director (MD) of Royal Cross Medical Centre. According to Olusegun Osoba in a July 2019 interview with The Nation, on the night of 23 August 1994, Okupe and Roberts saved the life of his gatekeeper from a gunshot wound to the head. He was also once a publisher of a health newspaper called Life Mirror.

=== Political career ===
Although Okupe was a medical doctor, he was also active in party politics. During the Second Nigerian Republic, Okupe was a House of Representatives candidate of the National Party of Nigeria (NPN) in the 1983 Nigerian parliamentary election. In the Third Nigerian Republic, Okupe became the National Publicity Secretary of National Republican Convention (NRC). He was one of the representatives of the NRC that observed the collation of the 1993 Nigerian presidential election results at the headquarters of the National Electoral Commission (NEC). The General Sani Abacha military government detained Okupe on 3 October 1996. Later on, in March 1998, during the aborted transition programme of Abacha, he was among the politicians who were disqualified from participating in United Nigeria Congress Party (UNCP) primaries. At the advent of the current Fourth Nigerian Republic, Okupe was appointed Special Assistant on Media and Publicity to President Olusegun Obasanjo. Later on, in 2002, he was one of the governorship aspirants of the People's Democratic Party (PDP) primaries in Ogun State, and was a major contender along with Gbenga Daniel. In 2012, President Goodluck Jonathan appointed Okupe as his Senior Special Assistant on Public Affairs.

Okupe was publicist at various times to Nigerian presidential aspirants of the PDP, including President Olusegun Obasanjo, President Goodluck Jonathan, Bukola Saraki and Vice President Atiku Abubakar. In July 2017, he announced his decision to leave the PDP to join the Accord Party, but for accepting to be the Chairman of the Campaign Media Council of Bukola Saraki for the 2019 presidential primaries of the PDP, the Accord Party expelled him in September 2018. He subsequently returned to the PDP, and became a spokesman of the Presidential Campaign Organisation of Atiku Abubakar, the PDP candidate for president in the 2019 Nigerian presidential election.

Okupe joined the Labour Party ahead of 2023 Nigerian general election and stood in as the running mate and vice presidential candidate of the Labour Party until a substantive candidate was picked.

== Legal issues ==
It was reported in August 2012 that Okupe and his companies were probed by the Economic and Financial Crimes Commission (EFCC) and accused of failing to execute road construction contracts awarded to his companies in 2004 by Benue State and in 2005 by Imo State. Eventually, a settlement was reached with Imo State, while the case with Benue State was resolved through arbitration.

In July 2016, it was alleged that ₦702 million of the embezzled $2 billion in the $2 billion arms deal or Dasukigate at the office of the National Security Adviser under the leadership of Colonel Sambo Dasuki was traced to Okupe by the EFCC. On 14 January 2019, the EFCC arraigned Okupe before a Federal High Court in Abuja on a 59-count charge bordering on alleged money laundering and diversion of funds to the tune of ₦702 million.

== Personal life and death ==
Okupe was married to Aduralere Okupe, with whom he had two children, Ditan and Bolu. While Okupe supported the PDP candidate, Atiku Abubakar in the 2019 Nigerian General Election, his son Ditan supported Muhammadu Buhari. In January 2021, his other son, Bolu Okupe, based in Paris, came out as gay on his Instagram page. He and his son Bolu supported Peter Obi for the 2023 Nigerian presidential election.

In May 2020, it was reported that Okupe and his wife, Aduralere tested positive COVID-19 on 23 April 2020 and had recovered.

Okupe died after a long battle with cancer at a hospital in Lagos, on 7 March 2025, at the age of 72.
