= Eruwa =

Eruwa Ojoko
- Town
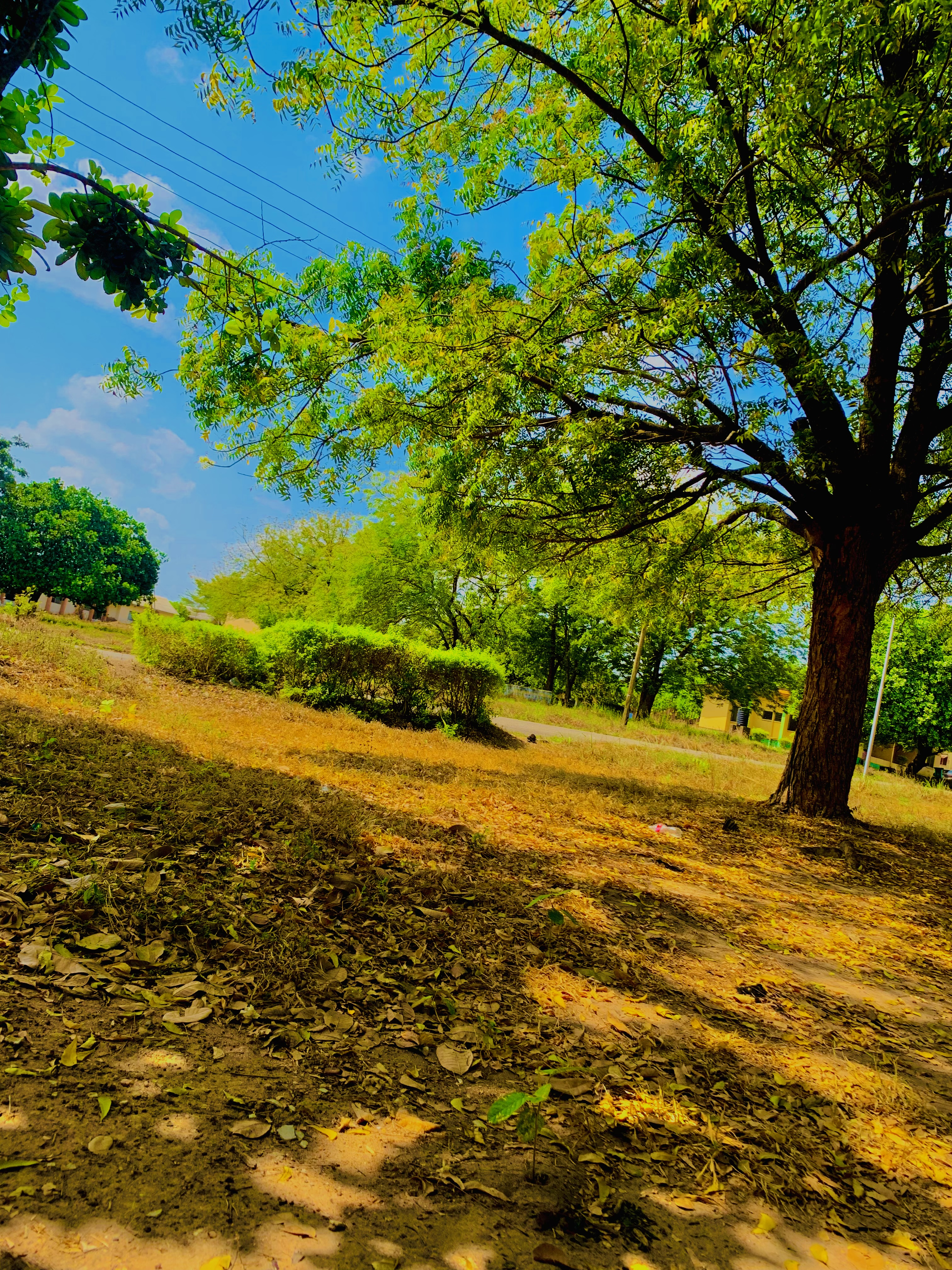
- Nickname: Omo Agbe dudu
- Motto: Ojoko A gbe wa o
- Location in Nigeria
- Coordinates: 7°32′59″N 3°27′0″E
- Country: Nigeria
- State: Oyo State
- LGA: Ibarapa East
- Established: 1830
- Founder: Obaseeku

Government
  - Eleruwa of Eruwa: HRM Oba Samuel Adebayo Adegbola, Ajobo Olurin I

Population
  - Religions: Christianity Islam Yoruba religion
- Time zone: UTC+1 (WAT)
- Climate: Aw
- Website: http://www.oyostate.gov.ng/

Eruwa (Yoruba: Èrúwà or fully (Èrú wà níbí o) meaning 'pieces of yam are available here' is a town and the headquarters of Ibarapa East Local Government Area in south-western Nigeria located in Oyo State. Eruwa is 72 km south west of Ibadan and 60 km north east of Abeokuta.

== History ==
Eruwa derived its name from the way in which hawkers advertised roasted yams to the northern caravans who constantly congregated in the town. The method of hawking employed was Èrú wà níbí o i.e. 'pieces of yam are available here'.

The four quarters in Eruwa at that time were Anko, Oke Oba, Isaba and Aborerin settled on Ilewu hill, which offered greater protection and security during the period wars in Yoruba land (from the 1830s to the 1890s). The founders of Eruwa were of Oyo origin. The leader of the group was Obaseeku who was a prince, a bare hunter as well as a powerful medicine man. Obaseeku married Oyinlola, an Oyo princess. The marriage produced two male children. The first child was named Akalakoyi (meaning 'the vultures have rejected this') and the second child was named Olaribikusi. The two children and their descendants constitute the two ruling families in Eruwa up till today.

The town is characterized by many hills. Perhaps the need for adequate security in those days of frequent wars was most likely the over-riding consideration in the minds of the early settlers. Like other Africans, Eruwa people were polytheistic in the past. They worshipped several gods and deities, prominent among which were Oro, Sango, Egungun, Orisa oko, Osanyin, Yemoja and Ifa.

The first corrugated iron sheet house in Eruwa was built in 1908. Following the massive destruction of Eruwa by fire in 1922, the majority of people started tooling up for the corrugated iron sheets

Eruwa is governed by a monarch whose recognized traditional title is Eleruwa, which means 'the owner/ruler of Eruwa'. He administers the town with the assistance of his chiefs and ward heads, who have the traditional title known as Baale. In 1979, a former military governor of Oyo state, Jemibewon, ranked Eleruwa fifth in the committee of sixty-seven traditional rulers accorded recognition by the state government. The article on Eleruwa features a list of past and present Eleruwa.

Eruwa is significant in many respects. It is the headquarters of the Ibarapa which had seven towns, namely Eruwa, Lanlate, Igboora, Idere, Ayete, Tapa and Igangan. During the pre-colonial days, Eruwa was recognized by the Alaafin of Oyo as the leading town in Ibarapa district. Similarly, during the colonial era, this leadership position was conveniently retained through political, economic and social services, culminating among others into structural development. In 1915, administrative rest houses were built in Eruwa and in the same year, a native court was opened at Eruwa.

Short oral history of Eruwa in Ibarapa language by a native speaker

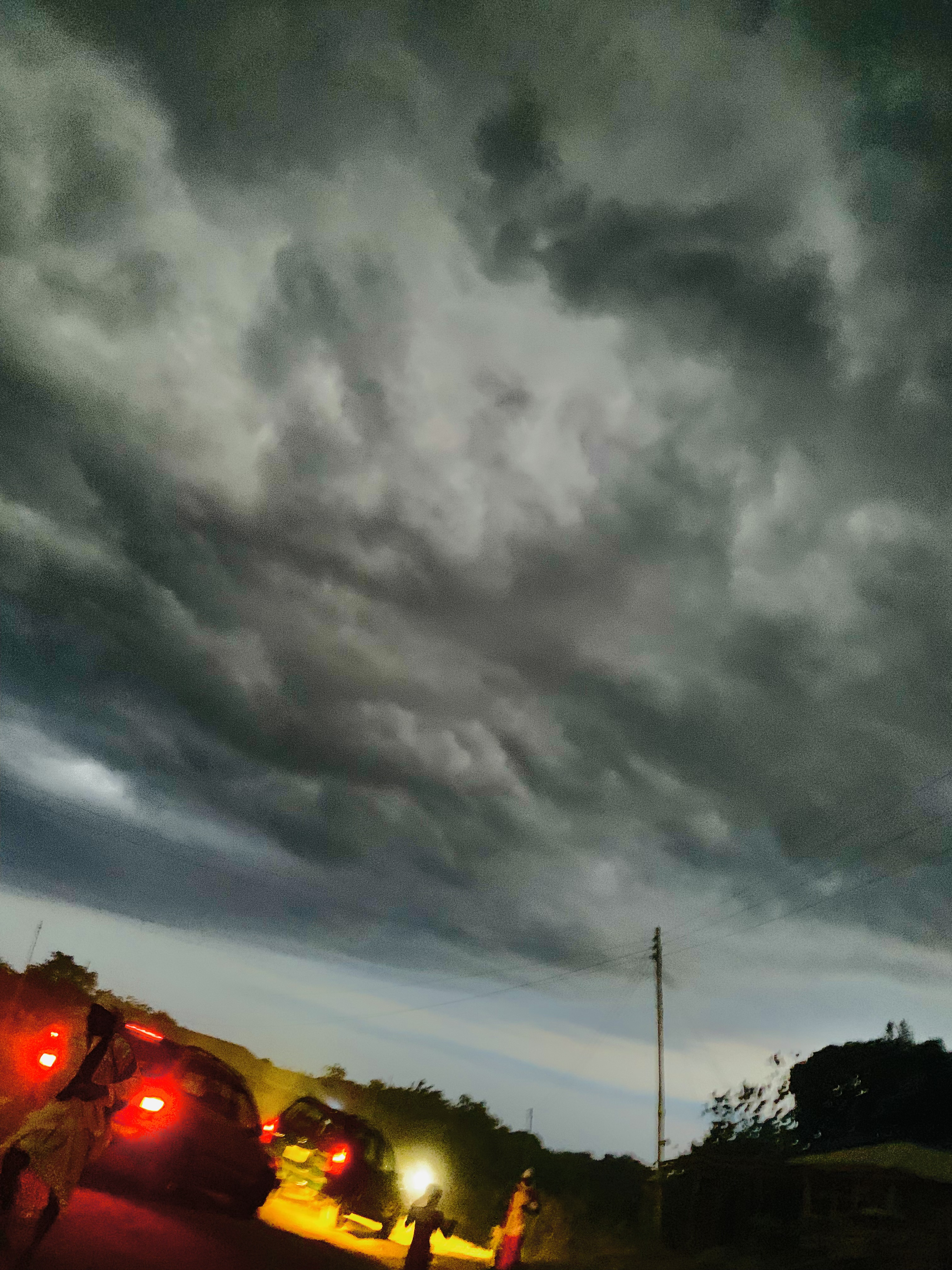
Heavy clouds over Eruwa

== Geography ==
Eruwa is located in south-western Nigeria in Oyo state. It is bounded in the north by Iseyin; in the east by Ibadan and in the south by Ogun state. The most remarkable geographical feature is the chain of hills. Prominent among these hills are Adoko, Akolu, Andoro, Apanpa, Eetaka, Ilewu, Obaseeku, Ofere, Ogodo, Ojoko, Okele, Oluweri and Wee-wee-onigba-poro. Eruwa is situated in the grass savannah with a number of streams flowing through it. These include: Baba Ode, Oluweri, Agboti, Ogboogbo, Ojuregbin Olusoji.

=== Climate ===
Eruwa has a tropical wet and dry climate, with a lengthy wet season and relatively constant temperatures throughout the course of the year. November to February forms the town's dry season, during which Eruwa experiences the typical West African harmattan. The mean total rainfall for Eruwa is 1,200 mm (47 in). There are two peaks for rainfall, June and September. The mean temperature ranges between 32.22 °C (90.00 °F) in January to March and 21.11 °C (70.00 °F) in June and August.

== Population ==
Eruwa's population was estimated to be 9,110 in 1934. In 1951 when Nigeria had its first national headcount, Eruwa's population was above 11,000. In 1963, the population has risen to 26,963. According to 2006 population census, the population of Ibarapa East Local Government is 118,288.

=== Religion ===
Christianity is the dominant religion in Eruwa with the overwhelming majority of inhabitants being Christians. Islam is the second most popular religion in the town. On the whole, Eruwa is a secular community with a high degree of freedom of worship. The Muslims and Christians co-exist successfully. Children of the Muslims and Christians go to the same school, work in the same places, and live peacefully under the same roof.

== Education ==
Eruwa is host to Adeseun Ogundoyin Polytechnic. It was established as a satellite campus of the Polytechnic Ibadan on Tuesday 19 January 1982 and later converted into an autonomous Polytechnic in 2014. The first set of students (88 in all) began their academic work in November 1981, a few months before the official launching ceremony. The school now offers courses leading to the award of the Ordinary National Diploma (OND) and Higher National Diploma (HND). There are also numerous public and private primary and secondary schools located in the town. Obaseeku High School is the first secondary school in Eruwa. It was established on 28 February 1964. Adeseun Ogundoyin Polytechnic was established in 2014.

== Economic activities ==
The indigenous economic activity of the people of Eruwa revolves around agriculture which includes farming, fishing, hunting and animal husbandry. Other economic activities include manufacturing and trading. The main crops include yam, cassava, guinea corn, maize, pepper, tobacco, cotton and melon seeds. Also grown in the area are cocoa, kola nuts, oranges and palm trees. The occupational choice of the people was largely influenced by the geographical location of the town.

== Administration ==
Eruwa is headed by a monarch who is referred to as Eleruwa of Eruwa. The present monarch, His Royal Majesty, Oba Samuel Adebayo Adegbola, Ajobo Olurin I, whose appointment was confirmed by the Executive Governor of Oyo State, Engr. Oluseyi Abiodun Makinde. Eruwa is the headquarters of Ibarapa East Local Government. Local Governments at present are institutions created by military governments but recognized by the 1999 constitution and they are the third tiers of government in Nigeria. Ibarapa East Local Government is made up of Eruwa and Lanlate. Eruwa has six wards, while Lanlate has four wards, making ten wards in total. The current chairman of the Local Government is Hon. Kazeem Arogundade of the Peoples Democratic Party, PDP.
