= Eleruwa =

Eleruwa is the title of the traditional ruler of Eruwa in Western Nigeria. The present Eleruwa of Eruwa, HRM Oba Samuel Adebayo Adegbola, Ajobo Olurin I was presented the staff and instruments of office on the 6th day of March 2025, by the Executive Governor of Oyo State, Engr. Oluseyi Abiodun Makinde.

== List of Eleruwa of Eruwa ==
1. Obaseeku – Ododo Baba Ewu
2. Olaribikusi I – Oba Agesinsawo
3. Olasubu – Akangbe Osin
4. Gbajumola I – Afasan (reigned till about 1860)
5. Sabi – Ayinla Edu
6. Olurin – Iyanda Agan
7. Omoni – Alade Efon
8. Sangotola (Fashina I)
9. Bankole-Akangbe Agan (died in 1911)
10. Ajao "Oti" reigned from 1911-1921 (deposed)
11. Bammeke "Alabi Agan" (1921–1937)
12. Fashina Akindele Ajani Sangotola II (1938–1944)
13. Adegboye (1947-1959)
14. Solomon Olanrewaju Olaribikusi II (1960–1969)
15. Bolanle Olaniyan Gbajumola II (1972-1994)
16. Samuel Adebayo Adegbola Akindele I (1998-2019). He was ousted by the Supreme Court.
17. Samuel Adebayo Adegbola Ajobo Olurin I (6 March 2025 - present)
