= 2023 Nigerian general election =

Nigerian General Election 2023

- 25 February 2023
- Presidential election
- Turnout: 26.71% (▼8.04pp)
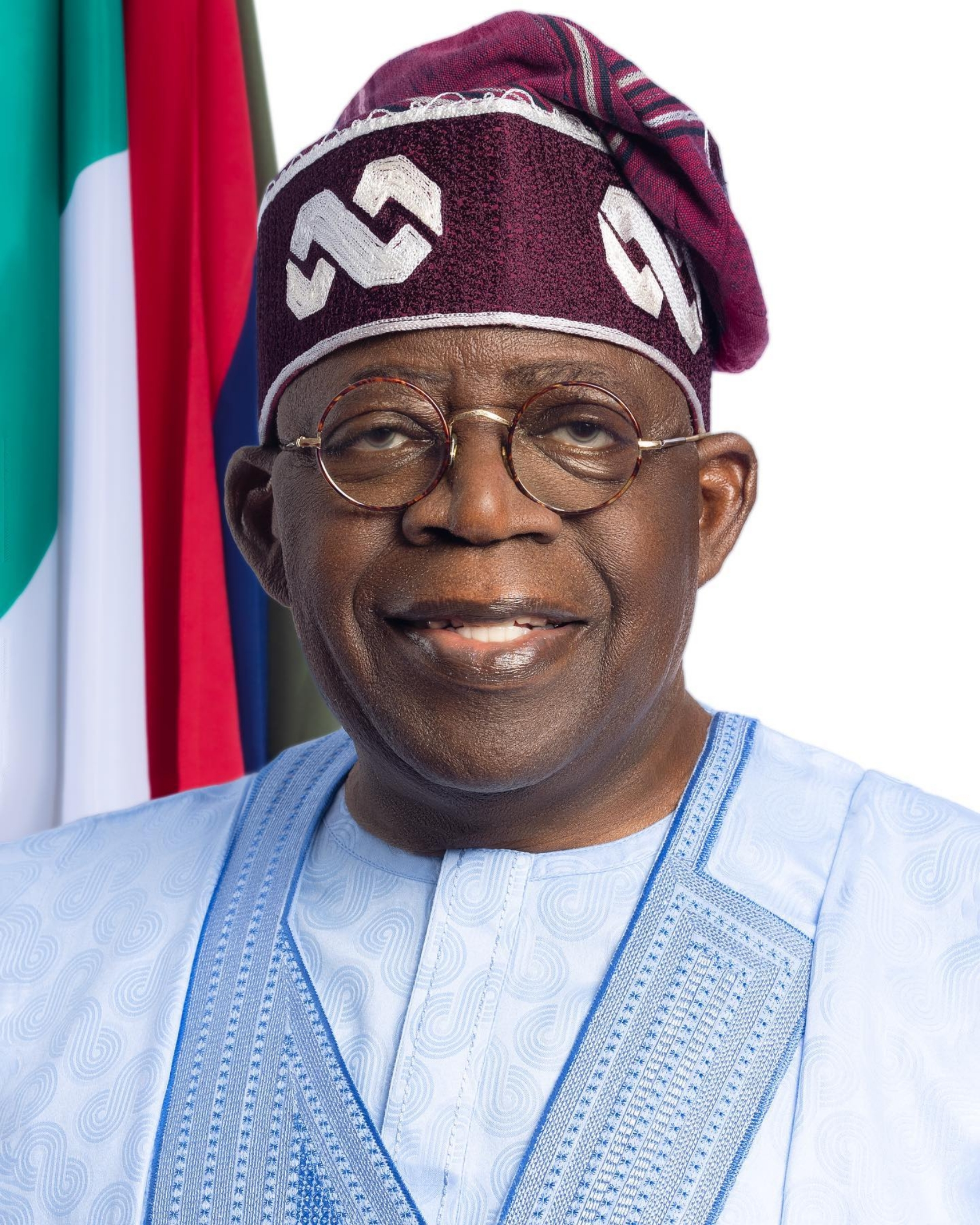

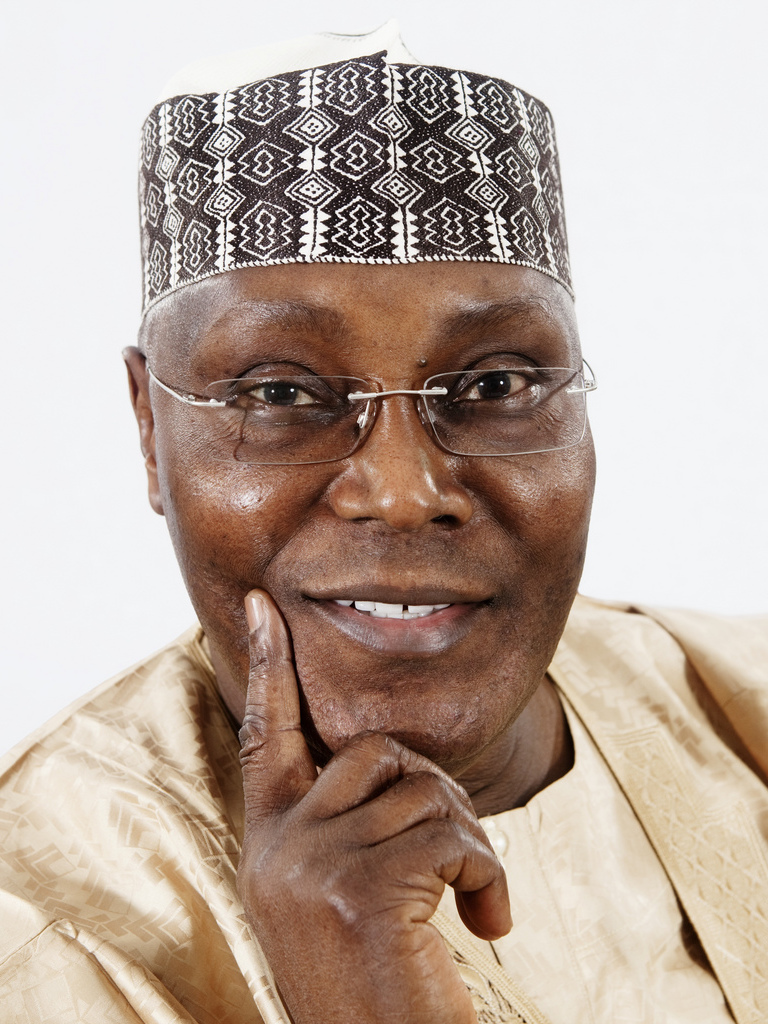

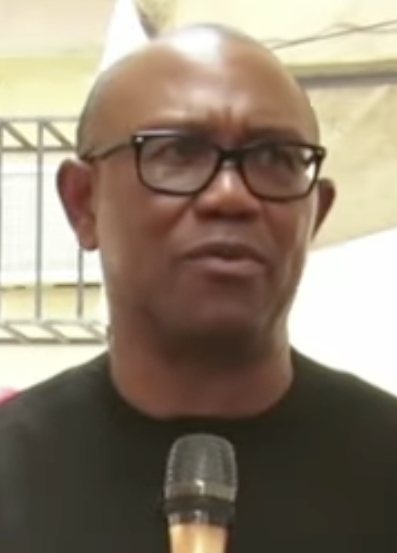

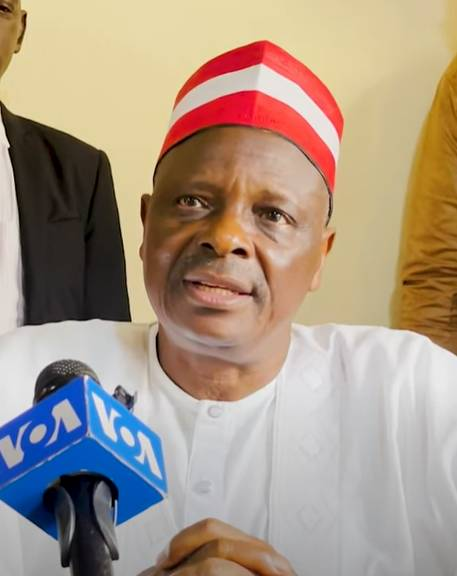
Nominee	Bola Tinubu	Atiku Abubakar
Party	APC	PDP
Home state	Lagos	Adamawa
Running mate	Kashim Shettima	Ifeanyi Okowa
States carried	12	12
Popular vote	8,794,726	6,984,520
Percentage	36.61%	29.07%
Nominee	Peter Obi	Rabiu Kwankwaso
Party	LP	NNPP
Home state	Anambra	Kano
Running mate	Yusuf Datti Baba-Ahmed	Isaac Idahosa
States carried	11 + FCT	1
Popular vote	6,101,533	1,496,687
Percentage	25.40%	6.23%
President before election
Muhammadu Buhari
APC
Elected President
Bola Tinubu
APC
- Senate election
- All 109 seats in the Senate
Party	Leader	Seats	+/–
APC	Godswill Akpabio	59	−4
PDP	Vacant	37	−8
LP	Julius Abure (Note: Party chairman; not a member of the House of Representatives)	7	+7
NNPP	Rufai Ahmed Alkali	2	New
SDP	Vacant	2	+2
APGA	Victor Ikechukwu Oye	1	+1
YPP	Bishop Amakiri	1	0
This lists parties that won seats. See the complete results below.
- House of Representatives election
- All 360 seats in the House of Representatives
Party	Leader	Seats	+/–
APC	Tajudeen Abbas	176	−26
PDP	Ndudi Elumelu	119	−9
LP	Julius Abure	35	+34
NNPP	Rufai Ahmed Alkali	19	New
APGA	Victor Ikechukwu Oye	5	−4
ADC	Leke Abejide (Note: Party's sole member in the outgoing House of Representatives)	2	−1
SDP	Vacant	2	+1
YPP	Bishop Amakiri	2	+2
This lists parties that won seats. See the complete results below.

General elections were held in Nigeria on 25 February 2023 to elect the president and vice president and members of the Senate and House of Representatives. Incumbent president Muhammadu Buhari was term-limited and could not seek re-election for a third term. This election was seen as the tightest race since the end of military rule in 1999.

== Electoral system ==
The President of Nigeria is elected using a modified two-round system with up to three rounds. To be elected in the first round, a candidate must receive a plurality of the votes and over 25% of the vote in at least 24 of the 36 states and the Federal Capital Territory. If no candidate passes this threshold, a second round will be held between the top candidate and the next candidate to have received a majority of votes in the highest number of states. In the second round, a candidate still must receive the most votes and over 25% of the vote in at least 24 of the 36 states and the Federal Capital Territory to be elected. If neither candidate passes this threshold, a third round will be held where just majority of the votes is required to be elected.

The 109 members of the Senate are elected from 109 single-seat constituencies (three in each state and one for the Federal Capital Territory) by first-past-the-post voting. The 360 members of the House of Representatives are also elected by first-past-the-post voting in single-member constituencies.

== Presidential election ==
=== All Progressives Congress primary ===
With President Muhammadu Buhari having been elected to the office of president twice, he was ineligible for renomination. There was no formal zoning agreement for the APC nomination despite calls from politicians and interest groups such as the Southern Governors' Forum to zone the nomination to the South as Buhari, a northerner, was elected twice. The party held its indirect presidential primary on 8 June 2022 in Abuja and nominated Bola Tinubu, the former Governor of Lagos State. In mid-June, the APC submitted the name of Kabir Ibrahim Masari—a politician and party operative from Katsina State—as a placeholder vice presidential nominee to be substituted at a later date. On 10 July, Ibrahim Masari formally withdrew as vice presidential nominee and later that day, Tinubu announced Kashim Shettima—Senator for Borno Central and former Governor of Borno State—as his replacement.

APC ticket
Presidential nominee	Vice Presidential nominee
Bola Tinubu	Kashim Shettima
Governor of Lagos State (1999–2007)	Senator for Borno Central (2019–present)

=== Labour Party primary ===
On 30 May 2022, shortly after former Governor of Anambra State Peter Obi joined the party from the PDP, the Labour Party held its presidential primary in Asaba where Obi was nominated unopposed. On 17 June, the party submitted the name of Doyin Okupe—a physician and former PDP candidate who became the Director-General of the Obi Campaign Organisation—as a placeholder vice presidential nominee to be substituted for someone else at a later date. On 7 July, Okupe formally withdrew as vice presidential nominee and the next day, Obi announced Yusuf Datti Baba-Ahmed—former Senator for Kaduna North—as his replacement.

LP ticket
Presidential nominee	Vice Presidential nominee
Peter Obi	Yusuf Datti Baba-Ahmed
Governor of Anambra State (2006; 2006–2007; 2007–2014)	Senator for Kaduna North (2011–2012)

=== New Nigeria Peoples Party primary ===
The New Nigeria Peoples Party (NNPP) held its convention and presidential primary election on 8 June 2022 and nominated Rabiu Kwankwaso, who was the sole candidate, as its presidential candidate for the 2023 general election. On 14 July 2022, Kwankwaso picked Isaac Idahosa as his running mate and vice presidential candidate of the NNPP.

NNPP ticket
Presidential nominee	Vice Presidential nominee
Rabiu Kwankwaso	Isaac Idahosa
Governor of Kano State (1999–2003; 2011–2015)	Bishop of God First Ministry a.k.a. Illumination Assembly (1985–present)

=== People's Democratic Party primary ===
In October 2021, newly elected PDP Chairman Iyorchia Ayu backed the indirect primary method of nominating a presidential candidate instead of the direct or consensus methods. There was no zoning agreement for the PDP nomination despite calls from politicians and interest groups such as the Southern Governors' Forum to zone the nomination to the South as the APC's Buhari, a Northerner, was elected twice. The party held its indirect presidential primary on 28 May 2022 in Abuja and nominated Atiku Abubakar—its 2019 nominee and former Vice President. On 16 June, Abubakar selected Governor of Delta State Ifeanyi Okowa as his running mate.

PDP ticket
Presidential nominee	Vice Presidential nominee
Atiku Abubakar	Ifeanyi Okowa
Vice President of Nigeria (1999–2007)	Governor of Delta State (2015–2023)

== National Assembly elections ==
=== Senate elections ===
The 2023 Nigerian Senate elections were held on 25 February 2023. All 109 seats in the Senate of Nigeria were up for election.

=== House of Representatives elections ===
The 2023 Nigerian House of Representatives elections were held on 25 February 2023. All 360 seats in the House of Representatives of Nigeria were up for election.

== Conduct ==
Allegations of problems in the election included shooting and other violent attacks on election workers and journalists, conflict of interest, lack of financial disclosures, and politicians displaying their ballots, which is not allowed.

== See also ==
- 2023 Nigerian gubernatorial elections
