= Tesslo =

Fashion company

- Type: Private limited company
- Industry: Fashion
- Founded: 2005
- Founder: Tessy Oliseh-Amaize
- Website: www.tesslo.shop

Tesslo (formerly known as Tesslo Concepts) is a fashion brand specialized in customized clothing. It was founded by Tessy Oliseh-Amaize in 2005, and now operates from Washington, D.C., United States.

== The Tesslo brand ==
Tesslo was founded by Tessy Oliseh-Amaize, a graduate of Fashion Design from Middlessex University, United Kingdom. She is the creative director of the brand. In 2006, Tesslo Concepts beat 126 other Nigerian fashion designers to emerge winner of the Best Fashion Designer Award at the Nigeria Fashion Show (NFS). In the same year, the brand was nominated for the Future Awards’ Entrepreneur of the Year (Beauty & Style) category.

In May 2016, Nigerian soccer icon, Sunday Oliseh modeled a collection of suits made by Tesslo. Tesslo is known for bold and classic designs that combine African and Western aesthetics. Some of Tesslo’s male collections have been modelled by journalist Ohimai Amaize. The brand is also famously known for The Sunday Look, a weekly Sunday fashion feature on Nigerian social media.
