= Adeseun Ogundoyin Polytechnic, Eruwa =

Polytechnic in Eruwa, Oyo State, Nigeria

- Type: Public
- Established: 2014
- Rector: Peter Adejumo
- Location: Eruwa, Oyo State, 200129, Nigeria; 7°31′39″N 3°25′24″E
- Website: aope.edu.ng

The Adeseun Ogundoyin Polytechnic, Eruwa is a state government higher education institution located in Eruwa, Oyo State, Nigeria. The current acting Rector is Peter Adejumo.

== History ==
The Adeseun Ogundoyin Polytechnic, Eruwa was established in 2014. It was formerly known as The Ibarapa Polytechnic, Eruwa.

== Head of various Departments in the University ==
Faculty of Communication and Management Studies

1.Accountancy - BOLAJI SA MRS.

2.Business Administration and Management - BABALOLA ALAO MRS.

3.Mass Communication. - MR ADEDIJI MO MR.

4.Public Administration. - ODUGEMI

5.Office Technology and Management. - MUSTAPHA M R MR

6.Marketing - CARIM

7.Purchasing and Supply - OYEKOLA O O MR.

Faculty of Engineering

1.Electrical and Electronic Engineering - Engineer OGUNDEJI

2.Computer Engineering. - Engineer ADEYEYE

3.Civil Engineering. - OLAGUNJU

4.Mechanical Engineering. - LADIPO O A MR

Faculty of Environmental Studies .

1.Estate Management and Valuation. - OLADENI

2.Fashion Design and Clothing Technology - ODESANMI A E MR

3.Architectural Technology - OLADOSU O.M MR

4.Fine and Applied Art - MR ADELEKE

Faculty of Science

1.Statistics - MR ODUSINA

2.Computer Science - OLAWALE

3.Science Laboratory Technology - BOLANLE E O MR.

4.Library and Information Science - FATOKUN A M MR

1.Accountancy - BOLAJI S A MRS.

== Governing Council Dissolution ==
Governo Seyi Makinde Oyo state governor dissolved the governing council of the school on 4 August 2022.

== Events in the school ==
=== Sensitisation program ===
OYACA's management conducted an awareness and advocacy initiative at Adeseun Ogundoyin Polytechnic, Eruwa, Oyo State, orientate students and staff about the agency's role. The chairman of agency told the students, the importance of Abstain from corrupt practices to safeguard the state well been.

==== Partnership/Development ====
Adeosun Ogundoyin Polytechnic Eruwa partnered with resource company to ease learning and academic environment to be easy and accessible across the campus. The collaboration has made Adeosun Ogundoyin one of the Cisco certified Network Academy Institutions, and as well as accredited Microsoft collaboration Institution in Nigeria.

=== Commission of building ===
Oyo state governor Seyi Makinde during his consultation visit to the Ibarapa region of the State, Governor Seyi Makinde inaugurated two 250-seater lecture rooms in the school Adeseun Ogundoyin Polytechnic in Eruwa Oyo state Nigeria.

== Courses ==
The institution offers the following courses;

- Fine Art
- Business Administration & Management
- Office Technology and Management
- Estate Management and Valuation
- Statistics
- Arts and Industrial Design
- Computer Engineering
- Purchasing And Supply
- Electrical/Electronic Engineering Technology
- Science Laboratory Technology
- Computer Science
- Mechanical Engineering Technology
- Civil Engineering Technology
- Library And Information Science
- Architectural Technology
- Fashion Design
- Fashion Design and Clothing Technology
- Mass Communication

== Admission Requirements ==
Aspirants seeking admission to Adeosun Ogundoyin Polytechnic must have chosen the polytechnic as first choice in the Unified Tertiary Matriculation Examination (UTME) and score nothing less than 120, with a relevant O'level Result in WAEC and NECO, NABTEB and have nothing less than 5 credits pass in relevant subjects.

== Matriculation ==
On 16 June 2022 Adeosun Ogundoyin Polytechnic Eruwa matriculated more than 2,000 students for 2021/2022 academic section in the school. The rector of the school urged all the newly admitted students to obey the rules and regulations of the polytechnic and be good ambassadors of the institution.

== Convocation ==
On 19 May 2023 the polytechnic convocated 8,000 students. The convocation was combined and mixed with previous graduands in the polytechnic since its autonomy in 2014.
