= 32 FM 94.9 =

Nigerian comedy radio station

32 FM 94.9 is an Ibadan based station and Nigeria's first comedy radio station. It is designed to create and broadcast provocative, entertaining, no-holds-barred humorous content and programs not available to listeners anywhere else on the radio. The station started broadcasting on 7 November 2017. It also features an internet radio service and also available on other internet streaming platforms. It is also tagged as the Fastest growing Radio Station in the South-West. On-Air Personalities of 32 FM 94.9 include Woli Agba, Alhaji Hamzat Oriyomi, MC Remote, Oluwatoyin Salau (Yellow Sisi), Adeniyi Kayode Samuel (Afouda) and a host of others.
