= Oriyomi Hamzat =

Nigerian journalist

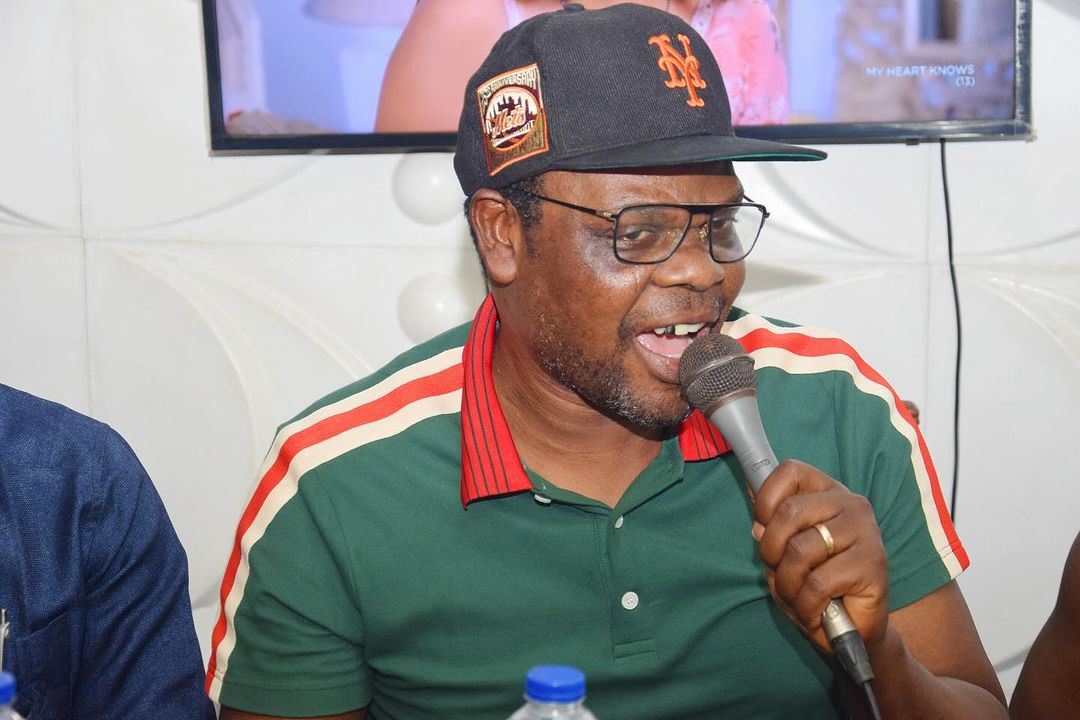
- Oriyomi Hamzat
- Born: Oriyomi Abdulrahman Hamzat; Ibadan, Oyo State, Nigeria
- Education: University of Ibadan, The Polytechnic, Ibadan, Adeseun Ogundoyin Polytechnic, Eruwa
- Occupation: Journalist human rights activist
- Father: Asimiyu Adekunle Hamzat,
- Awards: Honorary Doctorate in Art and Communications. International Humanitarian Service Award.

Oriyomi Abdulrahman Hamzat is a Nigerian broadcast journalist and human rights activist who serves as the Chairman of Agidigbo 88.7 FM.

== Background and education ==
Hamzat was born and raised in Ibadan, Oyo state, Nigeria, he’s a younger brother to late Asimiyu Adekunle Hamzat, a journalist of the Nigerian Television Authority (NTA). Hamzat completed his high school education in Iroko Community Grammar School before furthering to Oyo State School of Sciences, Pade. He earned a Diploma in Geology from The Polytechnic, Ibadan, and continued a course on Mass Communication at the institution's Eruwa Campus (now known as Adeseun Ogundoyin Polytechnic, Eruwa). In November 2023, Hamzat had his Bachelor's Degree in Linguistics and Language Arts from the University of Ibadan.

== Career ==
Hamzat started as a print journalist for the Nigerian newspaper The Guardian. He worked in many worked organizations including the Broadcasting Corporation of Oyo State (BCOS) in Ile Akede, Ibadan, the Federal Radio Corporation of Nigeria, Raypower, and 32 FM 94.9. Following his work experience in the media, he launched his own platform Agidigbo 88.7 FM.

One of his known contributions is the giving opinion for marginalized and silenced Nigerians. In the case of Timothy Adegoke, a student whose death under questionable circumstances sparked outrage was intervened by Hamzat.

In 2017, he was arrested by the Department of State Security on false charges.

== Awards and recognition ==
Award	Details	Date	Ref.
Honorary Doctorate in Art and Communications.	Conferred by the European-American University as D.Art, Honoris Causa.	April 2023.	
International Humanitarian Service Award.	Received for outstanding contributions to humanitarian service.	September 2023.	

== Oriyomi Hamzat Charity Foundation ==
Oriyomi Hamzat also has a charity foundation where he takes care of the motherless children, he carries the responsibilities of feeding and sponsoring their education.

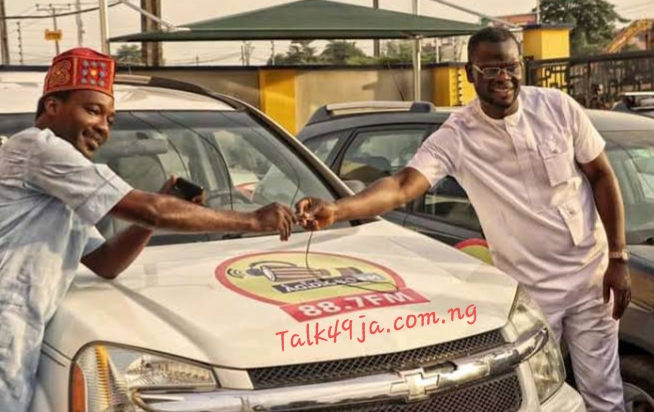
Oriyomi Hamzat gifts his staff a car

He recently gifted cars to his workers who worked with him in his radio station Agidigbo 88.7 FM
