= Bashir Yuguda =

Nigerian diplomat and politician

Bashir Yuguda is a Nigerian diplomat, politician and former Minister of State for Finance.

== Arms deal ==
On 30 November 2015, he was arrested in connection with the $2 billions arms deal. Preliminary evidence confirmed that Yuguda received ₦1.5 billions from the office of the National Security Adviser with no coherent basis for the financial transaction. The money was transferred into his account through an unknown company for inexplicable purpose. According to premium times, “The funds were directly transferred to him from the NSA office and he has been unable to explain the rationale for the transfer. The transfers were made to his account between December 2014 and May 2015,”. Additional ₦1.275 billion was also transferred to his account during the campaign for the Nigerian general election, 2015, and ₦775 million was transferred into his account from the office of the Accountant General of the Federation.
