= Ibarapa people =

Ethnic group

Ìbàràpá
Total population
- ~ 749,969 (2018)

Regions with significant populations
- Oyo State - 749,969 · Ibarapa North: 218,880 · Ibarapa Central: 322,189 · Ibarapa East: 208,900 Ogun State

Religion
- Islam · Christianity · Yoruba religion

Related ethnic groups
- Ọ̀yọ́, Ẹ̀gbá, Ònkò, Other Yoruba people

The Ibarapa are a Yoruba subgroup located in the Southwestern corner of Oyo State. The name of the group is derived from a local cultivar of the melon plant, known locally as Egusi Ibara, which was historically acknowledged by neighboring peoples such as the Egbas, Ibadans and Oyos to be extensively cultivated in the area.

== Geography ==
The Ibarapa area falls within latitudes 70.15ꞌ N and 70.55ꞌ N and longitudes 30E and 30.30ꞌ E. It is located approximately 100 km north of the coast of Lagos, and about 95 km west of the Oyo state capital and neighboring city of Ibadan. They border Yorubas of Onko extraction to the North (Iwajowa, Kajola and Iseyin LGAs) and Yorubas of Oyo extraction to the East (Ibadan). The Yewas or Egbados to the West, and the Egbas to the South.

The area is approximately 2,496 km^{2} in geographical size, which is about 8.77% of Oyo State, and consists mostly of rolling savannah with forests situated along the southern border and in isolated patches along river courses such as the Ogun. The natural vegetation was originally rainforest but that has been mostly transformed into derived type savanna as a result of several centuries of slash & burn agricultural practices. Most of the land lies at elevations ranging between 120 and 200 meters above sea level, but rocky inselbergs and outcrops can be seen rising to 340 meters (approx 1,115 ft).

== History ==
The Ibarapa people are said to have migrated into the area, either as dissidents of the Old Oyo empire, during the periods of constant internecine warfare between the different Yoruba states, as well as refugees escaping the transatlantic and trans-Saharan slave raiding business of the day. The Tapa segment of the population is said to have been formed by the Jihad ridden Nupe refugees from the northern Niger, who had lost their traditional state to Fula jihadists. The predominant occupation of the people is farming.

=== Post-1960 ===
Shortly after the dissolution of the old Western region, and the creation of the new Oyo, Ogun and Ondo states, some Ibarapa demanded that their communities be excised from Oyo and merged with Ogun. Those who favoured the merger said most Ibarapa historically hail from their Egba neighbours, and that they stood a better chance of rapid development in Ogun, which had just Four divisions, unlike Oyo which had a massive Twelve. The pro-Oyo elements amongst the Ibarapas denied any ancestral links with the Egbas, and that only one of the six quarters in the Igbo-ora township descend from the Egbas. in addition, they pointed to the fact that never in their history have they been administered jointly with, or from Abeokuta. The commission later found out that the siting of the local police divisional headquarter in the town of Eruwa was the root cause of the demands, with those on the east favouring a merger with Ogun, while those on the west were satisfied with the status quo. Eventually, it was decided that Ibarapa land remained where it was (Oyo State), and this was the final resolution accepted by the federal government in 1976.

=== Ibarapa towns and villages ===
Ibarapa land is traditionally made up of 7 principal towns known as the Ibarapa Meje (Ibarapa Seven), and their surrounding villages and farmsteads. These towns include Igangan, Eruwa, Aiyete, Tapa, Idere, Igbo-Ora, and Lanlate.

Igangan, Tapa and Aiyete are in Ibarapa North local government area, Idere and Igbo-Ora are in Ibarapa Central, while Lanlate and Eruwa are located in Ibarapa East local government. The three local governments were created by the federal government of Nigeria authorities in 1996 when Ibarapa East was carved out from the old Ibarapa Local Government while Ibarapa Central and North were carved out of the former Ifeloju Local Government area.

The seven principal towns can be subdivided further, based on the villages that are organized around each of them. In totality, about 120 different villages litter the landscape.

Igangan	Idere	Igbo-Ora	Tapa	Aiyete	Eruwa	Lanlate
Asuranran	Koso	Oke-Iserin	Tapa	Imofin	Olaribukusi	Adeta
Idiyan	Onigbio	Isale Oba	Iki	Iwafin	Akalako	Allala
Omidigbo	Oke-Oba	Oke Odo	Ago	Igbodoko		Ikona
Akoya	Apa	Idofin	Kogba	Orile-Odode		Iwena
		Iberekodo	Oba			Agasa
		Pako				Ilado
						Maya
						Oshogun
						Akeete
						Igbodudu
						Lagaye
						Ojonamo

== Twinning among the Ibarapa ==
In the 1960s, Professor PPS Nylander, obstetrician and gynaecologist conducted a series of research into the phenomenon of twinning and multiple birth in Ibarapa district. He found that the Yoruba of Ibarapa had the highest twinning rates in the world (45.1 per 1000 live births) and the twins were usually of the fraternal (dizygotic) type. This meant that the women were having multiple ovulations/egg releases in their menstrual cycles, and could be triggered by environmental factors. He further suggested these factors might be in the local yam being consumed by the people in the area.
