= Agidigbo 88.7 FM =

- Ibadan; Nigeria
- Broadcast area: Oyo State
- Frequency: 88.7 MHz

Ownership
- Owner: Oriyomi Hamzat

History
- First air date: 25 March 2021

Links
- Website: agidigbo887fm.com

Agidigbo 88.7 FM is a radio station located in Ibadan, Oyo State, Nigeria. It began broadcasting on 25 March 2021 and is owned by Oriyomi Hamzat, who also serves as an on-air presenter. Hamzat had previously been an online radio host, though his equipment had been seized after he criticized former Oyo State governor Abiola Ajimobi.

With the tagline, ‘the people’s voice’, it was founded by human rights advocate and broadcaster, Oriyomi Hamzat thus becoming the first radio station in Ibadan licensed to a broadcast journalist.

Once operating on the internet before it was razed in a fire in April 2020, the radio station began terrestrial transmission in February 2021. It started full commercial broadcast on 15 March 2021 and was later commissioned on 25 March 2021 by the governor of Oyo State, Oluseyi Abiodun Makinde.

The radio station runs programs in Yoruba, English and Pidgin.

The station hosts multiple personalities including Oriyomi Hamzat, Ajibola Akinyefa, Adedotun Amosun ‘Soul’, Yousuph Adebayo Grey, Abdulganeey Abdulrazaq ‘Mr. GRA’, Sekinat Adegoke Yusuph, Adenike Isola, Titlayo Akande, among others.

Its most popular shows include family arbitration programme, Kokoro Alate, socio-political commentaries, Awa Ara Wa and Bo Se Nlo Extra, political interview, National Discourse which has featured former Minister for Youth and Sports Solomon Dalung, former governor of Ekiti State Segun Oni, one time Presidential candidate Omoyele Sowore amongst other prominent Nigerians.

In the first few weeks of its existence, Agidigbo 88.7 FM continued to make the news for its successive atypical approach to broadcasting. This was reflected in the programming of the radio station which prioritized talk more than music, its newscast which suggests an editorial policy that hinges on human angle stories, original reporting and live correspondence, a hybrid mix of on-air personalities and its decision to run 24 broadcast hours daily.

Agidigbo 88.7 FM also surprised many by appointing a 25-year old broadcast journalist, writer and media personality, Yousuph Adebayo Grey as its Head of Station, the youngest the country has ever seen.

With its investigative show Digging Deep, Agidigbo 88.7 FM has also affirmed the possibility of investigative journalism on radio. In an interview with Premium Times, its Head of Station noted that, "the most important thing when it comes to sustaining an investigative desk is acknowledging [that] it is your calling and it is something that the people you are broadcasting to deserve. That alone will help you put a lot of effort into sustaining it. Practically, you can’t put ads on it to prevent dilution. We have about 105 programmes on the radio station, so if one is not giving direct revenue, we won’t mind. Also, we are working towards partnering with credible NGOs that support good journalism."

In just about three months of its establishment, Agidigbo 88.7 FM has been applauded for challenging the status quo within the broadcast industry in Ibadan most importantly with its wide coverage of the 2021 local government elections. The radio station maintains a strong digital presence.
