= Saliu Atawodi =

Chairman, Presidential Implementation Committee on Maritime Safety & Security (born 1952)

Air Vice Marshal Saliu Atawodi

Chairman, Presidential Implementation Committee on Maritime Safety & Security
- In office 2006–2012

Personal details
- Born: 4 July 1952 (age 73)

Military service
- Branch/service: Nigerian Air Force
- Rank: Air Vice Marshal

Saliu Atawodi,Officer of the Order of the Federal Republic (OFR), is a retired Air Vice Marshal of the Nigerian Air Force. Atawodi served as the chairman of the Presidential Implementation Committee on Maritime Security and Safety (PICOMSS) from its inception until its dissolution.The Federal Government disbanded PICOMSS following its refusal to merge with the Nigerian Maritime Administration and Safety Agency (NIMASA), leading to a jurisdictional conflict over control of the nation's waterways.

== Background ==
Atawodi was born on July 4, 1952, at Idah General Hospital in Idah Local Government Area of Kogi State, Nigeria. He completed his primary education in Ajaka/Idah and attended the Nigerian Military School, Zaria, from 1967 to 1971. In 1972, he joined the Nigerian Defence Academy as part of the Regular Cadet Course 12 and was commissioned into the Nigerian Air Force as a Pilot Officer on December 14, 1974.

Atawodi was the first Nigerian to complete an advanced fast jet flying course at the Royal Air Force, Valley, North Wales, UK, on the Hunter Aircraft. He subsequently attended the fast jet instructor's course with the Pakistan Air Force in Risalpur and graduated from the Air War College, Karachi, Pakistan, an affiliate of Karachi University. In 2005, Atawodi was awarded the National Honor of Officer of the Order of the Federal Republic (OFR).

== Early career ==
Atawodi is an experienced fighter pilot, having flown various aircraft in the Nigerian Air Force inventory and internationally, including the Bulldog, Jet Provost MK3A, Jet Provost MK4A, Hunter T7, Hunter F6, Hawk, and T-37, as well as the Mig 15, Mig 17, Mig 21, and Alpha jet. In 1983, Atawodi led the Mig 21 deployment in support of a Nigerian Army operation. In 1988, he designed and constructed the Air Force Air to Ground Firing Range in Kwenev Makurdi and became the first NAF Fighter Pilot to deploy the Air to Air Missile at the same range.

For over eight years, he led the Mig 21 aerobatic display team, garnering significant recognition within the Nigerian Air Force. Appointed as director of the Directorate of Food, Roads, and Rural Infrastructure (DFRRI) by General Fidelis Atahiru Makka in Benue State in 1988, Atawodi, then a squadron leader, improved the performance of Benue DFRRI from 19th to 4th among Nigerian states within a year.

== Human development ==
As Director of DFRRI in the then Benue State, Atawodi significantly impacted rural communities by constructing over 1700 kilometers of roads and electrifying 19 towns and villages. Notable among these were Ushongo and Achuwa in the Tiv-speaking area, Upu-London and Ogoli-Ogboju in the Idoma area, and Ojoku and Ajaka in the Igala-speaking area. He played a pivotal role in the creation of the Igalamela Local Government Area in 1995, leading the lobby group for its establishment. A strong supporter of church and mosque building projects across Igala land, Atawodi also runs a private scholarship sponsorship project benefiting several youths.

== Appointments held ==
Throughout his career, Atawodi held numerous appointments, including:

- Commanding Officer, Operation Conversion Unit, Air Defence Group, Makurdi
- Commander, Air Defence Group, Makurdi
- Commander, Air Weapons School, Kainji
- Director of Operations, NAF Headquarters, Lagos (1999–2000)
- Senior Air Staff Officer, NAF Training Command, Makurdi (2000–2001)
- Air Officer Commanding, Tactical Air Command, Makurdi (2001–2004)
- Air Officer Inspections, NAF Headquarters, Abuja (2004–2006)
- Chief of Policy and Plans, Defence Headquarters, Abuja (2006–2008)
- Chairman, Presidential Implementation Committee on Maritime Safety & Security, Office of the National Security Adviser (2006–2012)

== Medals and decorations ==
Atawodi has received several medals and decorations, including:

- Forces Services Star (FSS)
- Meritorious Services Star (MSS)
- Distinguished Service Star (DSS)
- Past Staff College (Dagger) (Psc (+))
- Fellow of the Air War College, Pakistan.

== Life after military ==
After his military career, Atawodi served as the Chairman of Vector Integrated Services Ltd, representing Eco-Gen California, USA, in 2022. A keen lawn tennis player, he established the SAA Tennis Foundation, a non-profit organization that organizes tournaments for young tennis talents, fostering their development. Atawodi holds several traditional titles, including Amana-Achofe by His Royal Majesty the Attah Igala in 1985, Dikenagha in 2007 from Bende in Abia State, Oga Etemahi Igalamela in 2008, and Ohioma Ejeh Ankpa in 2009. He was also a gubernatorial candidate in the 2011 Kogi State election and, in 2022, became Chairman of OMNI First Network Services.

== Controversy ==
In 2016, the Federal High Court in Abuja ordered the forfeiture of properties and cash belonging to Saliu Atawodi, worth over $200,000 and N120 million, based on an application by the Economic and Financial Crimes Commission (EFCC) alleging the properties were suspected proceeds of crime. However, on June 7, 2017, Justice Hassan-Yusuf overruled the previous judgment, declaring that Atawodi had no case to answer and acquitting him of all charges.
