= Africa Independent Television =

Privately owned television broadcaster in Nigeria

- Type: Private company
- Country: Nigeria
- Availability: Africa; Europe; North America
- Founded: 1996 by Raymond Dokpesi
- Area: Nigeria
- Owner: DAAR Communications plc.
- Key people: Dr. Raymond Dokpesi
- Launch date: 22 November 1996
- Official website: www.ait.live

Africa Independent Television, also known by its acronym AIT, is a privately owned television broadcaster in Nigeria. It operates Free To Air in Nigeria as the largest privately operated terrestrial television network with stations in twenty-four out of thirty-six states in Nigeria. AIT is also broadcast via satellite television from its operational headquarters in Abuja. AIT is a subsidiary of DAAR Communications plc, available throughout Africa, and via Dish Network to North America.

== History ==
The network emerged due to the deregulation of the Nigerian media landscape, which up until then, was dominated by federal and state government outlets. The station started broadcasting on 6 December 1996 on terrestrial television. Satellite broadcasts started on 3 November 1997.

In 1999, AIT launched AINET, a television syndication network established as a competitor to a similar service operated by the Nigerian Television Authority. The arrangement enabled a number of independent local television stations across Nigeria to affiliate with AIT. Participating stations broadcast core AIT programming during designated time slots while also contributing locally produced content for distribution across the wider network.

The AINET framework had initially been authorised the previous year under Tom Adaba, then Director-General of the National Broadcasting Commission. However, following a subsequent change in leadership, the NBC withdrew its support for the arrangement, maintaining that the national broadcasting code did not permit a single private broadcaster to operate an integrated network of this nature. AIT disputed this interpretation, arguing that its global broadcasting licence provided sufficient scope for the integration of affiliated stations nationwide. Nevertheless, AINET ceased broadcasting in 2000.

In the early 2000s, it was one of the many affiliates that relayed TVAfrica's output in Nigeria. From 2 July 2001, it carried the African Broadcast Network.

In the United Kingdom and Ireland, it was available on Sky channel 454 as a free-to-air channel (originally a subscription channel until 1 August 2016). An additional channel called AIT Movistar, formerly on Sky channel 330, ceased broadcasting on 28 July 2009. AIT International ceased broadcasting in the United Kingdom and Ireland on 15 October 2019.

== Shutdown ==
The founder, Raymond Dokpesi, led a peaceful protest to the National Assembly on 6 June 2019 to submit a petition requesting a review of the broadcast laws. Raymond Dokpesi had at a press conference earlier called the attention of the media to editorial interference, threats of sanctions and political bias by the Director-General, Modibbo Kawu of the National Broadcasting Commission (NBC), who had recently contested a primary election as an aspirant of the ruling All Progressives Congress for governorship in Kwara State. Dokpesi also alleged that the NBC was working on the orders of the Nigerian presidency to clamp down on the TV network over trumped up charges of violation of the broadcast code.

The broadcasting license of the television station was suspended indefinitely by the National Broadcasting Commission on 6 June 2019 on the grounds of its alleged failure to pay license fees and use of inciting contents from social media.

A Federal High Court in Abuja however ordered the reopening of the television station on 7 June 2019.

== Personalities ==
- Yemi Adenuga
- Ohimai Amaize

== See also ==
- List of television stations in Nigeria
