= Raypower =

Private radio network in Nigeria

- Nigeria

Programming
- Format: Afrobeats and urban contemporary

Ownership
- Owner: DAAR Communications Plc

History
- Founded: 1 September 1994
- First air date: 1 January 2005

Raypower is a group of independent private Nigerian radio stations broadcasting in multiple cities nationwide owned by media company, the DAAR Communications.

== History ==
In the wake of deregulation of broadcasting on 24 August 1992, DAAR Communications Plc, founded by Raymond Dokpesi, applied for and was granted approval to operate an independent radio station. The station which started test transmission on 15 December 1993 made history on 1 September 1994 when it commenced commercial broadcasting with the launch of Raypower 100.5 in Lagos, as the first 24-hour broadcast service station in Nigeria, as well as the first private independent broadcasting station in the country. The Abuja station launched on 1 January 2005.

In June 2019, the National Broadcasting Commission shut down Raypower and its sister television channel, Africa Independent Television. Dokpesi, an opposition figure, claimed his stations were being targeted and alleged licensing fees were too high. The commission said it forced their indefinite closure due to violations of broadcast codes and failure to meet other obligations to the regulator. It withdrew the suspension notice at the end of the month.

== Stations ==
Raypower stations
Frequency	City
100.5 MHz	Abuja
96.1 MHz	Akure
105.5 MHz	Benin City
95.7 MHz	Bauchi
95.1 MHz	Ibadan
106.5 MHz	Ilorin
100.5 MHz	Jos
106.5 MHz	Kaduna
100.5 MHz	Lagos
95.1 MHz	Osogbo
106.5 MHz	Port Harcourt
