= Raymond Dokpesi =

Nigerian media businessman (1951–2023)

Chief Raymond Dokpesi
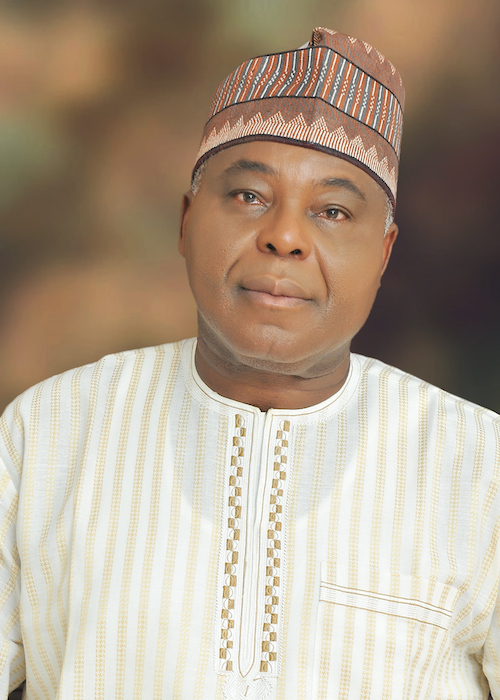

Personal details
- Born: Raymond Anthony Aleogho Dokpesi; 25 October 1951 Ibadan, Nigeria
- Died: 29 May 2023 (aged 71) Abuja, Nigeria
- Party: People's Democratic Party
- Education: University of Benin (Nigeria); University of Gdańsk
- Website: raymonddokpesi.com

Chief Raymond Anthony Aleogho Dokpesi (25 October 1951 – 29 May 2023) was a Nigerian media businessman and politician. His parents were from Agenebode, Edo state in a family including six sisters. He entered the Nigerian mass media industry with his company, the DAAR Communications and set up the Nigerian TV network Africa Independent Television (AIT). He was the organising committee chairman of the People's Democratic Party national conference in 2015. As of March 2020, he was undergoing a trial on corruption charges. In May 2020, Dokpesi survived a COVID-19 infection. He suffered a stroke shortly after the 2023 Ramadan and died from a fall on his treadmill on 29 May 2023.

== Education ==
Dokpesi started his early schooling with Loyola College, Ibadan. After this, he joined the Immaculate Conception College (ICC) in Benin City where he was the pioneer member of Ozolua Play house, a dance/drama group. He did his undergraduate studies at the University of Benin Edo State and completed his studies in University of Gdansk, Poland where he earned his Doctorate degree in Marine Engineering. His studies, from secondary school to university level, was sponsored by Alhaji Bamanga Tukur.

In the early 1990s, as a result of the historic National Broadcasting Commission decree, according to Muyiwa Oyinlola, Nigerian media was dominated by the government only. Information was only made possible by government-owned broadcasting firms. However, the Head of State, then General Ibrahim Babangida, issued another decree which allowed private broadcasting in Nigeria. After this decree came the first private television network in Nigeria, the Africa Independent Television (AIT) pioneered by Dokpesi. Dokpesi also later set up Africa's first satellite television station. Dokpesi not only pioneered the first satellite TV, but also the first privately owned radio station in Nigeria. According to the journalist Kolapo, Raymond claimed that AIT set the standard for salary structure in the media industry in which Nigerian Television Authority imitated.

== Career ==
Dokpesi started as the personal assistant to Alhaji Bamaga Tukur, one of the general managers of the Nigerian Ports Authority. Dokpesi also served as a civil servant in the Federal Ministry of Transport under Alhaji Umaru Dikko and General Garba Wushishi.

== Africa Ocean Lines ==
One of Dokpesi's first businesses, Africa Ocean Lines, was the first indigenous shipping line in Africa, and was established in the 1980s. Although the business did not last long, it contributed to the Nigerian shipping industry, as it helped formulate the Nigerian Shipping Act Decree 1986, which stated the sharing of formula 40:20:20 for cargo between developed and developing countries.

=== Daar Communications ===
In 1994, Dokpesi launched the first Nigerian private FM radio station, RayPower. Two years later, he launched Africa Independent Television.

=== Expansion in the USA and Europe ===
On 20 September 2003, Africa Independent Television launched its signals in the United States. Presently, AIT is received in the United States, Mexico, the Caribbean, and Europe-wide on the Hotbird satellite as well as countries within Africa.

== Politics ==
Dokpesi also had his hands in politics. One of his first political assignments was as a political campaign manager for the Alhaji Bamanga Tukur, which saw Tukur into the then-Gongola now-Adamawa state government house. He also assumed the same role during Alhaji Adamu Ciroma's presidential campaign and Tukur's presidential campaign in 1993, as well as during Peter Odili's presidential campaign. Dokpesi was one of the leaders of the South-South People Assembly (SSPA) an organisation that seeks to promote the South South people of Nigeria. In 2017, Dokpesi contested for the PDP National Chairmanship position, but lost to Uche Secondus.

== Criticism and controversy ==
On 4 October 2010, Dokpesi was arrested for his alleged role the Abuja car bombings. He was released after spending nine hours in detention and afterward sued the country's secret police for alleged wrongful imprisonment.

On 11 November 2015, Dokpesi, on behalf of the PDP party, made a public apology due to the mismanagement of Nigeria under the PDP government.

"Make no mistake, the PDP is aware that there were errors made along the way. We admit that at certain times in our past, mistakes have been made; we did not meet the expectations of Nigerians. We tender an apology. But the past is exactly what it is. We call on all party faithful, supporters and sympathisers to partner us going forward."

Dokpesi also criticised the PDP for fielding Goodluck Jonathan as the PDP's presidential candidate in the March 2015 elections.

== Money-laundering and corruption criminal charges ==
On 9 December 2015, Dokpesi and his company, Daar Holding and Investment Limited, were charged in the Federal High Court, Abuja in a US$2.1 billion money laundering scam. The FG claimed the money was budgeted for weapons procurement for the Nigerian military to fight against the Boko Haram militants, but was confirmed diverted by Sambo Dasuki, the then National Security Advisor, to Dokpesi's Daar Holding and Investment Limited for the Nigerian presidential election of 2015 in favour of President Goodluck Jonathan.

The court charges, marked "FHC/ABJ/CR/380/2015" and filed by the Economic and Financial Crimes Commission (EFCC) indicated that they are accused of violating the Money Laundering Act, the EFCC Act and the Public Procurement Act. The presiding judge, Justice Gabriel Kolawole, granted bail to Mr. Dokpesi and adjourned the trial until 17 February 2016.

On 22 March 2019, Dokpesi was returned to jail after being arrested at the Nnamdi Azikiwe International Airport in Abuja, where he arrived after returning from medical treatment in Dubai, but was soon released. In November 2019, he was granted the right to leave Nigeria for medical reasons despite the ongoing trial proceedings.

On Thursday, 1 April 2021, Raymond Dokpesi was acquitted of all money laundering charges by the Federal Appeal Court of Nigeria.

== Illness and death ==
In 2020, Dokpesi and members of his family were hospitalised at the University of Abuja Teaching Hospital after they were diagnosed with COVID-19. Dokpesi and two of his grandchildren were discharged on 14 May 2020 after they all tested negative for remains of COVID-19. At the time of this discharge, however, Dokpesi's son Raymond Jr. and other family members were still receiving treatment.

Dokpesi died from a stroke on 29 May 2023, at the age of 71.

== Awards and honours ==
His hometown conferred two chieftaincy titles upon him, both of which are only bestowed on worthy sons. Dokpesi was mentioned during the Dr. Kwame Nkrumah Leadership Award ceremony in Accra, and the Foundation for Excellence in Business Practice Geneva, Switzerland for his work with DAAR Communications.
