= DAAR Communications =

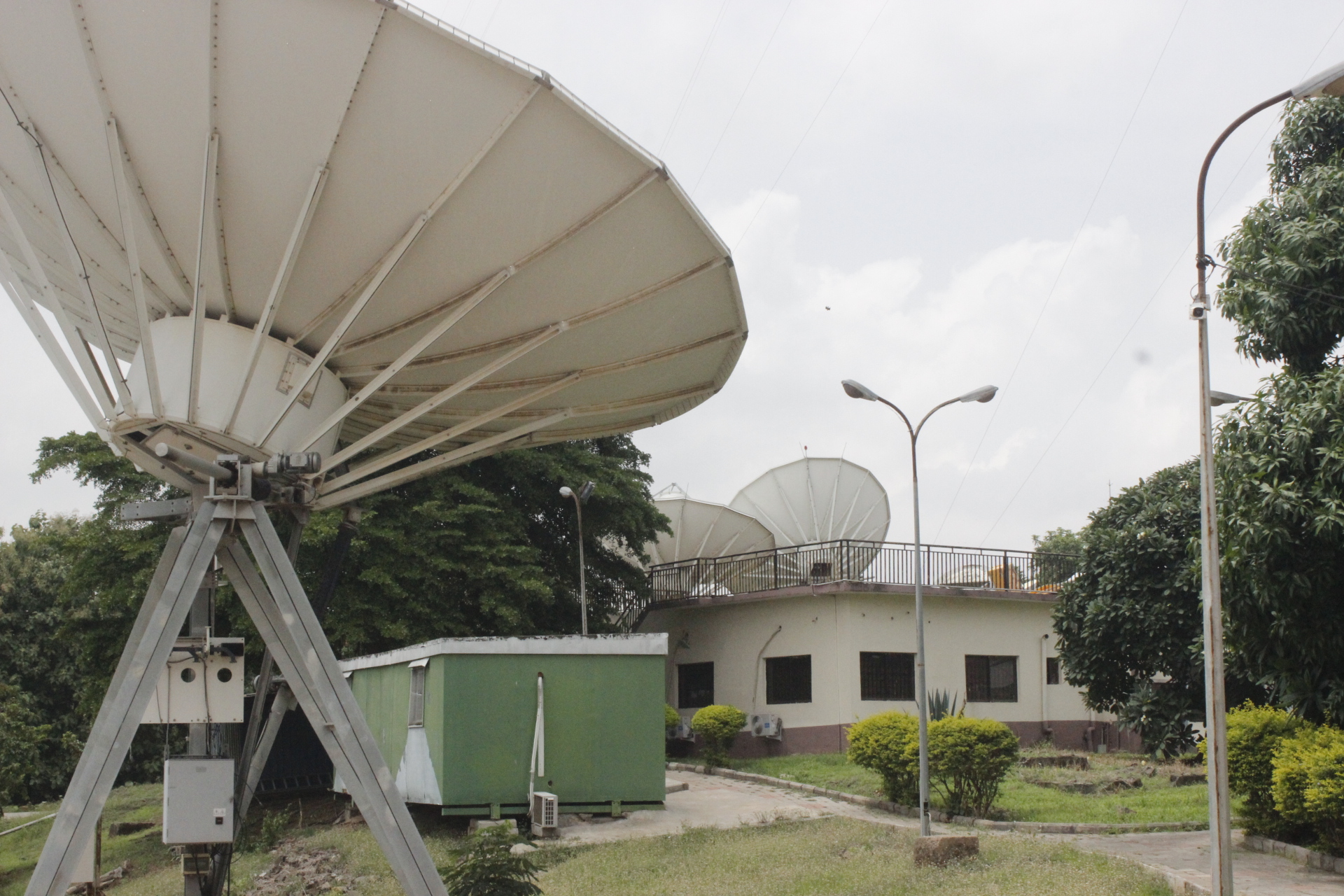
DAAR Communication Office

DAAR Communications plc is an independent privately owned broadcasting organization in Nigeria. It was established on 31 August 1998, by Raymond Dokpesi. On 23 April 2007, it was converted into a public liability company. It pioneered Africa Independent Television (AIT), Ray power 100.5 FM Abuja and Raypower 100.5 FM. The company is listed on the Nigerian Stock Exchange.

The DAAR communication Plc was penalized with a fine of ₦500,000 in July 2018 with two weeks optimum. The fine was imposed by the National Broadcasting Commission as a result of alleged infringement on the provisions of the Nigeria Broadcasting Code. The Director-General of NBC, Mallam Is’haq Modibbo Kawu, claimed that the fine was imposed "following the persistent and flagrant infringement of the provisions of the Nigeria Broadcasting Code through the use of provocative, inflammatory and divisive comments by anchors on the Raypower programme, Political platform".

== Operations ==
The corporation is involved in creating, producing, and promoting entertainment-related news and information to a worldwide audience. It possesses and manages a collection of news outlets, radio stations, and television networks dedicated to entertainment. Its RayPower 100.5 FM content consists of current events, international music programming, athletics, news, business updates, weather forecasts, specials, cultural events, health pointers, magazine/developmental features, and musicals/entertainment. Its Africa Independent Television (AIT) offers television broadcasting with a programming theme that conveys the African experience to the worldwide community. The programming on AIT includes news, current events, public awareness, business, musicals, athletics, magazines/talk shows, cultural events, tourism, AIT International, and AIT Sports. It offers a range of corporate services. The corporation also has television production operations in Nigeria.. The company also owns Faaji FM, a community radio station located in Alagbado area of Lagos State. The radio station is mostly focused on indigenous issues and local content.
