= List of villages in Borno State =

This is a list of villages and settlements in Borno State, Nigeria organised by local government area (LGA) and district/area (with postal codes also given).

== By postal code ==
LGA	District / Area	Postal code	Villages
Abadam	Abadam	602103	Abadam; Arege; Banuwa; Bisku; Bisogana; Dareche; Fuguwa; Jabulani; Karinowa; Kudokurgu; Lariski; Mallamfatori; Metele; Yau; Yawa-Kura; Yituwa
Askira/Uba	Askira	601103	Bagiau; Chul; Dum Bam; Giwa Kir Koma; Jimbulumu; Kauthlama; Njoma; Uba; Uwotaku; Yimirali; Ngulde; Gwahi; Yimurgo; Uvu; Mughal; Thulbwa; Wamdeo
Askira/Uba	Lassa	601107	Dille; Gegombi; Huyum; Kuhi; Lassa; Malka Dini
Bama	Amchaka	610110	Amchaka; Chachile; Dara; Malge; Marka; Ndire; Wnilibari
Bama	Bama	610101	Alhajiri; Bama; Burari; Dipchari; Goniri; Hausari; Iza; Jeree; Kasugula; M. Mastari; Mairi; Malum Mustari; Ndobe; Ngurosoye; Said; Shehuri; Sir Ajaa; Tandari
Bama	Dar El-Jamal	610107	Borwashe; Bulongu; Dar-el Jamal; Dipchari; Jere; Kotenbe; Mbuliya
Bama	Gulumba	610102	Bagumari; Bakara; Batra; Bulamanga; Burguma; Guluma; Gulumba; Gulumba-Gana; Jaburi; Jakkure; Kash-kash; Kashimiri; Kutila; Malam-Koriri; Ndoria; Ngureri; Walasa; Zangeri
Bama	Soye	610108	Abbaram; Jandiri; Kajeri; Mala Ajiri; Nguro Soye
Bama	Woloji	610103	Barki; Bula Umar; Darai; Dusuwa; Jinner; Jumeili; Kote; Kumshe; Maksomari; Modileyegoru; Yarwa
Bama	Ya biri	610109	Banki; Buduwa; Ghongolo; Tarmuwa Kura; Yabiri Gana; Yabiri Kura; Yawe
Bayo	Briyel	603104	Balbaya; Bera Fulani; Bulama Kabi; Chamgum; Dagon Zaga; Dawal; Fikhayel; Gadaba; Gaidam; Gama dadi; Garun Gado; Gedaba; Gubeli; Guburunde; Gumjara; Hara-Guwal; Jara Bah; Jara Guwal; Jauro Garga; Kabara; Kanawa; Karko; Kukal; Laro; Limanti; Maduya; Maina Baba; Nyawi; Sakdiya; Tale; Tashan Itashe; Tashan tsamiya; Tenteni; Tundun Wada; Wuyo; Yababa; Yarda; Zange; Zara
Biu	Biu central	603101	Biu; Diwar; Filin Jirgi; Garu Pirsina; Garwashina; Gashua; Ghuma; Jalingo; Kabura; Kenken; Manda Fumwa; Mandara Abdu II; Mbula Kivi; Mbulamel; Piku; Pompamari; Sulumithla; Tashan Danfulani; Vinkuthla; Waka; Yawi; Zara Kwara; Zara Wuyaku
Biu	Biu East	603108	B. C. G.; Birma Jugwal; Brikuthi; Dugja; Galdimari; Guma; Gwaram; Kampala; Mainahari; Mandara Abdu I; Nassarawa; Ntzukuku; Shuwari; Tabra; Tum; Yamarkumi; Yamir Pilasar; Zara Diza; Zara Minnga
Biu	Dadinkowa	603109	Bam; Berum; Buratai; Chara; Dam; Duzuma; Galabinda; Gunda; Kamuya; Kurnari; Maiduguri; Njibi; Palma; Panana; Yarda
Biu	Miringa	603102	Alagarno; Bowa; Burashika; Chukwarzir; Garubula; Gur; Gur Lawan; Helma Jibir; Kimba; Mandaragirau; Mangada; Miringa; Ngrum; Warawara; Ya Adam; Zira
Chibok	Chibok	601102	Bwalagyang; Chibok; Forfor; Garu; Gatamwarwa; Kautikare; Kautikari; Korogillum; Korogillum A; Kuburmbula; Mbalala A; Mbalala B; Mboa-Kura; Piyemi; Shikarikir B; Shikarkir A; Whuntaku
Damboa	Ajigin	601106	Ajigi Bulabulin; Ajigin Mairi; Auma; Chiralia; Gorgore; Malumti; Ndoksa; Shettima - Abogu; Talala - Buba-Modu; Talala-Buba-Ali
Damboa	Damboa	601101	Abulam; Adika; Azur; Ba' ale; Bego; Burum; Burun kauji; Damboa; Dusula; Forfor; Garjang; Gazama Bori; Gazama kura; Golgi; Gorgube; Gumsuri; Gwange; Izzge; Jamyeri; Kachallaburari; Kafa; Kalla; Kauji; Kaushirowa; Kawaram; Kaya; Kinzagiraji; Kobchi; Koljiri; Korede; Kuboa; Kuburivu; Ma tangile; Mafi; Maisaimar; Malaharam; Malemiri; Mangubum; Misa-Kurbudu; Molgoi; Mugula; Multe; Ngirnn; Ngwalimiri; Njaba; Nzuda; Sabon Gari; Shiwari-Kura; Wajirako; Wawa; Wovi; Wuyaram; Yazza; Yerwa
Dikwa	Dikwa	611101	Antiau; Azgajita; Bajangawa; Dikwa; Dudure; Durba; Gajibo; Jemuri; Kaza; Kuduge; Kulehe; Malumaja; Maula; Mudu; Muktala; Sawa; Sunabaya
Dikwa	Gumsu	611106	Afuye; Aubre; Boboshe; Durbel; Jemuri; Kaza; Kudeye; Magarta; Mallam Mafa; Mudu; Mujigete; Mukeye; Mulye
Gubio	Gubio	602102	Doili; Fulatami; Gazabure; Gubio; Gubio I; Gubio II; Jilili; Kanguri; Karaguwa; Karauwa; Kareto Kanguri; Moleram; Musari
Guzamala	Guzamala	612104	Adua; Gudumbali; Guworam; Guzamala; Kangarwa; Mairari; Moduri; Wamiri
Gwoza	Gwoza	610106	Agapalwa; Alau; Amdaga; Ashigashia; Balangele; Balazala; Barawa; Bokko; Bulabulin; Duma; Cineni; Falagwe; Gadful Bubayawa; Guduf; Gwoza; Gyomuyi; Hambagda; Izghe; Jaye; Kina; Kirawa; Kuranabansa; Kwatara; Limankara; Lokodisa; Luva; Matakam; Ngabura; Bitta; Sastawa; Timir; Tokombana; Valangai; Yinagu
Hawul	Kwajjafa	603106	Azare; Bamjikil; Bwala; Chacdamari; Dagora; Dangola; Dibarmi; Dikir; Dira; Funwa; Gala; Gauza; Ghung; Gwadzahar; Gwallam; Gwamagira; Harang; Hizhi; Hyera Central; Hyeraki; Hyerea South; Hzalama; Jibhuhuwi; Kirmi; Kumba; Kunar; Kurkurupu; Kwagu; Kwagu Shar; Kwajjafa; Mbokva; Pela Chiroma; Pela Thlabu; Puba; Saboda Allah; Sabon Gari; Shaffa; Shiduffu; Subwang; Sura; Tabomsha; Tarfa; Tashan Alade; Tawasu; Timpil; Traku; Uba; Wakdang; Walama; Yelwa; Yimana
Hawul	Kwaya Bura	603112	Agula Tulari; Billa; Buta Kayamda; Diralang; Domchaba; Durkwa; Dusu; Hurra; Kuba; Kwaya Bura; Minta; Mularam; Ndiragana; Pirtha; Shikthaku; Shiti kam; Taga-Ramta; Tashan Gauta; Tila; Vina Dam
Hawul	Sakwa	603105	Agga Bura; Azare Piti; Azare Tasha; Bantali; Barki Sakwa; Batabwa; Bayu; Bilatum; Bokokatau; Bubalkwi; Bukin; Bwala Katsina; Chata; Dagiza; Damudanaka; Dikira; Dim; Dlirim; Dulmi; Duthlalang; Dzaku; Funwa; Galdimare; Garkwi; Ghuma; Giraba; Girassa; Gum; Gumbar; Gumshim; Gwandzang; Gwanga; Gwaski; Gyeraha; Hema; Huba; Humsu; Hyentira; Jara; Kida; Kidang; Kingging; Kirkidang; Labu; Lakshari; Laraski; Lokoja; Malang; Marama; Mbirti; Mbulatawiwi; Mbuma; Mimithiu; Mindi; Ndirim; Ndirsha; Nduraku; Ngassam; Ngilangshimtu; Ngwa; Pakilama; Pama; Pela Ola; Pelakitsa; Pirkisu; Pirkutum; Pizumbin; Posira; Pusda; Sabon Gari; Sakwa; Sakwa-Bura; Samari; Shaffa Wuyaku; Tanga Rahi; Tawakari; Thlakwa; Tong; Tsahuyam; Turkuta; Wabar; Wabara; Warni; Whitambaya; Wida; Wuyaku; Yalmatata; Yaulan; Yelwa; Yimirshika; Zabu; Zali; Zange; Zham
Jere	Jere	600104	Addamari; Alau; Bale-Galtimari; Dala-Lawanti; Dusuman; Gamboru; Gongulong; Jere; Koshebe; Lawanti; Maimusari; Mashamari; Masu; Ngudda; Tuba
Kaga	Kaga	601105	Afe; Amindole; Barwa; Benisheik; Bokwori; Bulamuri; Buma'a; Bunguji; Burgumma; Dapchi; Didiri; Digimari; Dogoma; Dongo; Dongozo; Gabchani; Galangi; Gangawa; Ganidia; Girgimor; Gubturo; Guno; Jallori; Karagawan; Koyomi; Koyori; Kuruno-Kayar; Lawani; Mainok; Maintagujeri; Maintakurururi; Malam Mustani; Marguba; Mida Koyemi; Modu Koyamri; Mordori; Mulum-Kumuriri; Ngamdu; Tamsu; Tobolo; Umarari; Warsala; Wasaram; Wasaram Lawan; Wugiru; Wujure; Yelemari; Yewal
Kala/Balge	Ranna	611103	Balile; Bombo; Diama; Dogilai; Duguma; Dusum; Gilgil; Gilgo; Gulgum; Jarawa; Kabel; Kala; Kalam; Kulakula; Kulakura; Kulkaraka; Kutilar; Mada; Masana; Meleri; Mokholo; Ran; Rann; Sabba; Sigal; Tilam
Konduga	Auno	610111	Ajiri; Bulabulin Ngaburawa; Dalwa West; Ghabbol; Jajel Auno; Jakana; Jweu; Lambia; Masba Abbari; Nguro Nguro; Njimtilo; Nyaleri; Sandia; Sojbri; Yajiwa
Konduga	Konduga	610104	Bazamri; Dalori; Dalwa East; Kaigamari; Kawuiri; Kellumiri; Konduga; Mairamri; Malari; Ngalimari; Wanori; Yabal; Yale Garu; Yaleri
Kukawa	Kanembu	612102	Adua; Ajiri; Alagama; Baga; Barwati; Bongoa; Borgoa; Bundur; Cross Kauwa; Da'awao; Dabu; Degagu; Dogoshi; Garanda; Gudunbali; Kangarwa; Kauwa; Kekeho; Kukawa; Moduwari; Ngurtuwa; Toyo; Yoyo
Kwaya Kusar	Kwaya Kusar	603103	Algarno; Balba; Bargu; Bila; Bilazi; Bima; Charangi; Chikwi; Dayar; Dema; Dlashu; Duchi; Dunkur; Durum; Fesingo; Gadam; Gaidam; Gamsama; Gashina; Giba; Guba; Gubai; Guburde; Gudula; Gujba; Gusi; Guwal; Gwandi; Hema; Hutayankwar; Jagali; Jaki; Jalingo; Juga; Jugual; Kenzuwa; Keri; Kopala; Kuam Sheng; Kubuku; Kullankasan; Kurba Gayi; Kuthi Dika; Kwagu; Kwardun; Kwathaung; Kwaya Kusar; Lafiya; Lesga; Magaba; Maiba; Mbula; Midla; Minta; Moku; Paka; Pankilang; Pela Tsuigi; Peta; Pika; Pukuma Miyim; Salahu; Saura; Tawasu; Wada; Wandali; Wara; Wawa; Yangwam; Yimbu; Yimirdlalang; Zobi
Mafa	Mafa	611104	Anadua; Gawa; Kajari; Koshebe; Limanti; Loslari; Ma' afa; Mafa - Nguranna; Mafa Abbari; Masa; Mbuta; Mijigine; Siguabuya; Tamsugu Ngandua; Umarari; Zannari
Magumeri	Magumeri	602104	Abagoderi; Ambolu; Ardoram; Borno Yesu; Dandalmai; Dusugua; Furram; Gabchari; Gabtaru; Gajiganna; Ganan; Ganijia; Garmiri; Geske; Gultaru; Jakkana; Ka'ajia; Kalizoram; Kupti; Layratti; Magumeri; Magumeri A.; Magumeri B.; Mallum-Busariri; Malum Mustari; Monoram-Gonimiri; Ngamma; Ngubola; Ngura's; Risugua; Umarari; Yasku; Zumtur
Marte	Marte	611105	Ajiri; Ala; Alla; Bodairi; Burahutube; Fage; Garadia; Gumma; Kabula; Kaje; Kajekura; Kirenowa; Kulli; Majadukuri; Marte; Masaba; Mawulli; Mugum; Musune; Ngalori; Njine; Saba; Saula; Wubsa; Yedi; Zaga
Mobbar	Mobbar	602101	Abadam; Ajiri; Arege; Asagar; Asar; Bamuwa; Barmuwa; Bisigu; Bisku; Bisogana; Bisua; Buram; Camba; Dailo; Damasak; Dankalia; Dansalia; Daregelewa; Dawram; Derechewa; Duji; Duri; Faguwa; Galai; Garege; Garuwa; Gashagor; Gashigar; Gashiwar; Gir; Gonigiro; Goniri; Gugawa; Gumaram; Jabulam; Kabela; Kabewa; Kaleri; Kalinowa; Kareto; Karibia; Karimbori; Karinboa; Karinbowa; Kaririwa; Kashiniguri; Kauwa; Kaya; Korikutila; Kwari-Nonori; Ladari; Lamlam; Lariski; Lavaski; Layi; Limbur; Maiduri; Malam Fatori; Malamsuri; Mallam Kwanori; Mamti; Masakai; Masaki; Meleri; Metele; Mobbar; Monor; Nagajia; Ngaji; Ngam; Ngamakayale; Nwainowa; Tingiri; Tororam; Uran; Yarumiri; Yau; Yauma Wango; Zari
Monguno	Monguno	612101	Aburaku; Aliyu; Asadu; Bida; Damakuli; Das'a; Dasama; Dedela; Difinowa; Kabal-Balum; Kabulawa; Kaganam; Kalwa; Kaworil; Kumalia; Mandala; Mashilia; Miutar; Mongal; Monguno; Musari; Ngalram; Ngarannam; Ngollam; Ngurno; Wulo; Zulim; Zulum
Ngala	Ngala	611102	Adari; Dagala; Fim; Gamboru; Jegerawaji; Logamani; Manawaji; Meleri; Ndusu; Ngala; Nissini; Samboru; Tunukalia Shelim; Wulgo Momodu; Wulgo-Nagirari; Wurge; Wushelia
Ngala	Ranna	611107	Amsabura; Balammbe; Balila; Bombe; Daima; Dogilai; Duguma; Dusum; Galgum; Gangaya Saokara; Gilego; Gilgil; Jarawa; Jarawa Tatakura; Kabel; Kala; Kalakura; Kalam; Karche; Kulakula; Kulakura; Kulkaraka; Kumega; Kurana; Kutilar; Mada; Masana; Meleri; Mokhelo; Ran; Sabba; Sangaya; Sigal; Tilam; Tumishe; Wumbi
Nganzai	Nganzai	612103	Alarge; Badu; Bubabulin; Damakara; Daram; Felo; Gadai; Gadayi; Gajiram; Kingoe; Kuda; Kurnawa; Maiwa; Miye; Sababuwa; Sahsawa; Shattam; Sugundure; Zigalta
Shani	Kubo	603110	Bargu; Burashika; Dalhat; Dumbuku; Gwalasho; Jalingo; Kashime; Kubo
Shani	Lakundum	603111	Gasi; Gora; Kombo; Kubodemo; Kurnglung; Lakundum; Yabe
Shani	Shani	603107	Bakaima; Burgulok; Ghari; Guldugurung; Gwaskara; Kabara; Kimtin; Kurje; Lajada; Pela; Walama

== By electoral ward ==
Below is a list of polling units, including villages and schools, organised by electoral ward.

LGA	Ward	Polling Unit Name
Abadam	Arege	Arege Pri. Sch.; Dogon Chuku; Metele Pri. Sch. I; Metele Pri. Sch. II; Kannama; Tumbun Mari I; Tumbun Mari II; Tumbun Gini I; Tumbun Gini II
Abadam	Banowa	Banowa Pri. Sch.; Garere Pri. Sch.; Limbari
Abadam	Fuguwa	Alla; Bulangila; Foguwa; Gawasa I; Lariski; Minare; Musugun; Nga'Am Pri. Sch.; Tallam
Abadam	Jabullam	Daya Primary School; Jabullam East; Jabullam Pri. Sch. I; Jabullam Pri. Sch. II; Yauma Wango
Abadam	Kudokurgu	Anguwan Modu; Anguwan Sulemam; Comm. Viewing Centre; Duguri Pri. Sch.; G. S. S M/Fatori; Kudokurgu H/Centre; Kudokurgu Barracks; Limanti, Mobbarti
Abadam	Mallamfatori Kessa	Anguwan Dinkima; Budumari; Doro Pri. Sch.; Kessa'A Lawanti; Limanti I; Limanti II; Market West; Tumbun Dan Kastina; Yashinnam
Abadam	Malam Kaunari	Afunori Pri. Sch. I; Afunori Pri. Sch. II; Busuguna Lawanti; Busuguna Gana; Kaniram
Abadam	Yau	Ngamma; Ngauro; Ngariska Pri. Sch.; Yau Pri. Sch.
Abadam	Yawa Kura	Abadam Pri. Sch. I; Abadam Pri. Sch. II; Abadam Pri. Sch. III; Bosso Kyari; Bula Gana; Yawa Kura
Abadam	Yituwa	Bazzam Balleri I; G. J. D. S. S Abadam; Njara A; Shettima Ganari; Yituwa Pri. Sch.; Bazzam Balleri II
Askira / Uba	Askira East	Askira Central; Kofar Audu Babur; Sadiq Askira I; Sadiq Askira II; Kofar Ladan I; Kofar Ladan II; Bulama Kwagi I; Bulama Kwagi II; C / Bulguma; Njoma Pri. Sch.; Bello Gajere; Yimir Ali Pri. Sch; Ibrahim Nkeki I; Ibrahim Nkeki II; Wachira Kabai; Tabang; Kofar Ladan III
Askira / Uba	Chul / Rumirgo	Ribadu Pri. Sch.; Chul Pri. Sch. I; Chul Pri. Sch. II; Kidlindila Pri. Sch I; Kidlindila Pri. Sch II; Rumirgo Pri. Sch. I; Rumirgo Pri. Sch. II; Rumirgo Pri. Sch. III; Rumirgo Pri. Sch. IV; Viewing Centre I; Viewing Centre II; Adamu Gaji; Wacthirakabi; Pubagu Pri. Sch.; Bakin Kasuwa
Askira / Uba	Dille / Huyum	Dille Pri. Sch. I; Dille Pri. Sch. II; Bulama Kwang; Kelle Pri. Sch.; Pumpum Pri. Sch. I; Pumpum Pri. School II; Yamue Pri. Sch. I; Yamue Pri. Sch. II; Shishiwa Pri. Sch. I; Shishiwa Pri. Sch. II; Giwa Lita; Apagu Ngida; Wasada Pri. Sch. I; Wasada Pri. Sch. II; Karagama; Sabon Gari Pri. Sch.; Kasuwa I; Kasuwa II; Bulama I; Bulama II; Kofar Sarkin Kasuwa
Askira / Uba	Husara / Tampul	Dispensary I; Dispensary II; Tampul Pri. Sch. I; Tampul Pri. Sch. II; Sabon Gari Pri. Sch.; Wada Uwa; Nangu Pri. Sch.; Daura Pri. Sch.; Kofar Tambaya; Para Pri. Sch. I; Para Pri. Sch. II; Kofar Hamidu I; Kofar Hamidu II; Kofarf Jibril; Kasuwa; Husara Pri. Sch.; Kofar Audu I; Kofar Audu II; Mubula
Askira / Uba	Kopa / Multhafu	Kopa Pri. Sch. I; Kopa Pri. Sch. II; Buba Dogo I; Buba Dogo II; Yaffa Pri. Sch.; Bulama Wankari; Multhafu Pri. Sch.; Lawan Gambo I; Lawan Gambo II; Antikin Ya I; Antikin Ya II; Badagu Pri. Sch.; Ngurhyengwal; Giwa Higi
Askira / Uba	Lassa	Motor Park I; Motor Park II; Mala Thlawur; Kofar Katsalla I; Kofar Katsalla II; Mallam Wampana I; Mallam Wampana II; U. P. E. Pri. Sch. I; U. P. E. Pri. Sch. II; G. D. S. S Lassa; Samuwa Pri. Sch.; Kofar Lawan
Askira / Uba	Mussa	Mussa Pri. Sch. I; Mussa Pri. Sch. II; Mussa Pri. Sch. III; Mussa Pri. Sch. IV; Burda Pri. Sch. I; Burda Pri. Sch. II; Alhaji Patali; Kasuwa I; Kasuwa II; Gwagumdi; Kofar Bulama; L / Nasara Pri. Sch.; Gwandang Pri. Sch. I; Gwandang Pri. Sch. II; Dembo Pri. Sch.; Pogu Wapa; Kofar Fatiyanda
Askira / Uba	Ngohi	Yahi Chiroma; Bulama Ali; Leho Pri. Sch.; Bulama Bukar I; Bulama Bukar II; Bulama Mamman I; Bulama Mamman II; Alagarno Pri. Sch. I; Alagarno Pri. Sch. II; Alagarno, Bulama Dahiru; Kofar Bulama; Ngohi Pri. Sch.; Yaga, Thlagwar; Mussa Thlalala I; Mussa Thlalala II; B. A Bojoga; Biji, Biji; Pupa Nyunyu
Askira / Uba	Ngulde	Garambal Pri. Sch.; Kofar Bulama Ali I; Kofar Bulama Ali II; Kofar Kashatiya; Kofar Jumbulum I; Kofar Jumbulum II; Wala Pri. Sch.; Gima Pri. Sch.; Kofar Nyaviv I; Kofar Nyaviv II; Warge Central Pri. Sch.; Kofar Bulama Hiu I; Kofar Bulama Hiu II; Kofar Bulama Wuyaku I; Kofar Bulama Wuyaku II; Wawa Tagu Pri. Sch.; Kofar . B. Gorgor; Kofar B. M Fali; Kofar A. Adam
Askira / Uba	Uda / Uvu	Kofar Abdu I; Kofar Abdu II; Kofar Miji; Kasuwa; Uda Pri. Sch.; Kofar Chiroma; Uvu Pri. Sch. I; Uvu Pri. Sch. II; Zii Pri. Sch. I; Zii Pri. Sch. II; Piza Pri. Sch. I; Piza Pri. Sch. II; Kofar Joshua I; Kofar Joshua II; Kasuwa I; Kasuwa II; Kofar Ezekel I; Kofar Ezekel II; Kofar Emmanuel I; Kofar Emmanuel II; Kofar Yunana
Askira / Uba	Wamdeo / Giwi	Giwi Pri. Sch. I; Giwi Pri. Sch. II; Kofar Jauro; Walafa Pri. Sch. I; Walafa Pri. Sch. II; Kasuwa I; Kasuwa II; Tsohon Kasuwa I; Tsohon Kasuwa II; Shuibu I; Shuibu II; Mungum; Buba Tatap; Kwabila; Kofar Badaum
Askira / Uba	Zadawa / Hausari	Mai Zage I; Mai Zage II; Viewing Centre I; Viewing Centre II; Kofar Yanga I; Kofar Yanga II; Halidu Kadir; Adamu Ganga I; Adamu Ganga II; Bello Danyan Kasko I; Bello Danyan Kasko II; Leho Pri. Sch. I; Leho Pri. Sch. II; Leho Pri. Sch. III; Bulama Umoru Kallau
Bama	Andara / Ajiri /Wulba	Andara I; Andara II; Tangalanga; Kodo Daudabe; Madawaya; Tarmua Gana; Wulba Kura; Kodo Mukdo Kura; Ndabaza Kura; Bem, Bem; Kesh, Kesh; Magaribu; Barkari; Ajiri; Gala Gana
Bama	Buduwa / Bula Chirabe	Banki Malari; Banki Kura; Banki Dispensary I; Banki Dispensary II; Banki Bula Bulin I; Banki Bula Bulin II; Tara Dagal I; Tara Dagal II; Yakuwami; Banki Goniri; Tarmua Kura I; Tarmua Kura II; Alhaji Yusuf; Alhaji Bukar; Banki Pri. Sch.; Abba Ashemi I; Abba Ashemi II; Yakwami; Nariku; Buduwa . B Mallam; Gala B. Kilado; Amchide B. Nana I; Amchide B. Jongoma; Amchide B. Nana II; Amchide B. Bukar; Wajere B. Umar I; Wajare B. Umar II
Bama	Dipchari / Jere / Dar-Jamal / Kotembe	Kotembe Pri. Sch. I; Kotembe Pri. Sch. II; Ngubdori B. G; Dipchari Pri. Sch. I; Dipchari Pri. Sch. II; B. Bukar Yaye; Leno B. Hassan I; Leno B. Hassan II; Jere Pri. Sch. I; Jere Pri. Sch. II; Dar Jamal Pri. Sch. I; Dar Jamal Pri. Sch. II; Gaide B. Ali; Bula - Bulin; Chongolo B. Tijani; Kircha B. Gujja; Wudila B. Sheriff
Bama	Gulumba / Jukkuri / Batra	Bulama Kachalla I; Bulama Kachalla II Bukar; Bulama Alimami; Durbe Ngubdori; Bula Bulin; Rafa Algoni; Mungule; Gulumba Pri. Sch.; Yemut; Kachallari; Dukje B. Modu; Badimari; Walasa Kusuluwa; Nguzoa; Bonzong; Kashimri Tandari I; Kashimri Tandari II; Awaram; Mbaga Eli; Rijia
Bama	Kasugula	Lawan Maiduguri I; Lawan Maiduguri II; Saina M. Abba I; Saina M. Abba II; Saina M. Abba III; Saina M. Abba IV; Behind K. P. School I; Behind K. P. School II; Leprosy Clinic; Bulama Bashir I; Bulama Bashir II; Aji Wankema; Bulama Umar I; Bulama Umar II; Kasugula Pri. Sch. I; Kasugula Pri. Sch. II; Kasugula Pri. Sch. III; Kasugula Pri. Sch. IV; Kasugula Pri. Sch. V; Bintu Goskoma I; Bintu Goskoma II; Peace And Charity I; Peace And Charity II; Malarima; Bulama Modu I; Bulama Modu II; Wakil Goniye; Bulama Lamba Usman; Bulama Goroye I; Bulama Goroye II; Mammy Market I; Mammy Market II; Ligaliri; Bukar Tela; Bone - Garal; F. S. P. Clinic
Bama	Kumshe /Nduguno	Kumshe B. M. Dispensary; Kumshe B. Jungudum; Kumshe B. Mallam; Janneri B. Fannabe; Nduguno - Kura; Warafaya; Zantalanye; Jadawa B. Aja; Bigoro; Mordo; Bula Umarbe; Mabaraka; District Head's Office I; District Head's Office II; District Head's Office III
Bama	Lawanti / Malam / Mastari / Abbaram	Lawanti I; Lawanti II; Abbaram; Botori; Tafanawa; Gadangari; Malam Kodomiri; Malam Mastari; Mala Ajiri; Wurwaza; Jongomari; Baram Kuma'A; Jaltawa
Bama	Marka / Malge / Amchaka	Walasa Pri. Sch.; Walasa Lawanti; Bugurmari; Gudjari; Malaum Kari Pri. Sch.; Malaum Kari Lawanti; Bazaya; Chingurmi; Bula Mangabe; Amchaka Lawanti; Amchaka Pri. Sch.; Aka Dabanga; Ngurmulji; Kilimiri; Mboroya; Digira Abba Ashe; Digira B. Tokke
Bama	Mbuliya / Goniri / Siraja	Dole I; Dole II; Siraja Kura; Kurzum; Chingori Kura; Chingori Gana; Angola; Kirisuwa; Goniri Pri. Sch. I; Goniri Pri. Sch. II; Goniri; Bararam; Goni Kurmi; Alafa Yayaye; Maska Yerimari; Mbuliya . L. Aga; Mbuliya . L. Iza; Tarmua Pri. Sch.; Mbuliya . B . Mallam
Bama	Sabsabwa / Soye/ Bulongu	Burari; M. Kagilmari I; M. Kagilmari II; Bashari; Soye Dispensary I; Soye Dispensary II; Kajeri; Zaramiri; Bocest I; Bocest II; Sabasbwa Pri. Sch.; Mai Mallumri; Uiicest; Mairamri; Makintari; Bulongu; Jaudiri Bocest I; Jaudiri Bocest II; Jaudiri Bocest III; Bulama Nasawa; Borwoshe; Bula Alibe; Bula Morebe; Bulama Mainari I; Bulama Mainari II
Bama	Shehuri / Hausari / Mairi	Shehu's Palace I; Shehu's Palace II; Shehu's Palace III; Central Pri. Sch. I; Central Pri. Sch. II; Bololo Bore Hole I; Bololo Bore Hole II; Ngomari Ex. Boarding I; Ngomari Ex. Boarding II; Hausari Pri. Sch.; Ex. Boarding Pri. Sch.; Kaigamari Pri. Sch. I; Kaigamari Pri. Sch. II; Abba Habib; Buluma Modu Gadangar; Lawan Maina Bukar; Bulama Modu Wanzama I; Bulama Modu Wanzama II; Fugu B. Wanzam; Old Bama Pri. Sch.; Abuja Police Barracks; Alhaji Kodomi I; Alhaji Kodomi II; Filin Sukuwa I; Filin Sukuwa II; Government Lodge; Custom I; Custom II; Kaigamari East; Shehuri East; Bulama J. Gate I; Bulama J. Gate II; Lawan Ngare; Lawan Mamman . I; Lawan Mamman . II; District Head I; District Head II; District Head III
Bama	Wulbari/Ndine/Chachile	U. T. A. B Mamman; Wulbari; Bula Mastafabe; Yerwa B. Modu; Borjino; Kessa Kalla; Bogomari; Jabbari; Mallumari; Njimbitte
Bama	Yabiri Kura/Yabiri Gana/Chongolo	Kote Kura I; Kote Kura II; Garji; Dogoro Bulama; Abuja; Bula Bundibe; Mbaga Kura; Daudiri; Tufa; Chongolo; Nimela; Bula Marwaye; Zala Kura
Bama	Zangeri/Kash Kash	Zangeri Pri. Sch.; Lawanti; Ali Chingori I; Ali Chingori II; Saleri; Sabte; Suwa I; Suwa II; Mogo B. Udaya; Fogus Bulama; Dagili; Yere B. Abutoma; Bula Bulin; Daleye B. Mamman
Bayo	Balbaya	Balbaya Dispensary; Panya; Balbaya Pri. Sch.; Kukwal Pry. Sch.; Tondi Yakubu Pri. Sch.; Mainawa
Bayo	Briyel	Briyel Dispensary; Briyel District Office; Briyel South; Girabe Pri. Sch.; Wuro Ladde
Bayo	Fikayel	Fikahyel South; Angwan Hausawa; Sarki Ali Tera; Bayawa; Angwan Haruna; Fikahyel North
Bayo	Gamadadi	Gamadadi Pri. Sch.; Gamadadi Dispensary; Maina Baba; Jauro Garga; Sambo Daba
Bayo	Jara Gol	Jara Gol Pri. Sch.; Tuji; Gwanjara Pry. Sch.; Ndeki Pri. Sch.; Korko Pry. Sch; Lolom
Bayo	Jara Dali	Dali Pri. Sch.; Dali Dispensary; Zange Pri. Sch.; Pela Kombo Pri. Sch.; Guva Yoho Pri. Sch.; Machiya Pry. Sch
Bayo	Limanti	Limanti Pri. Sch.; Tsangayari Pry. Sch; Batsari Pry. Sch; Dawal; Chongom; Kuva
Bayo	Teli	Teli Pri. Sch.; Teli Central; Yard; Garingado Pry. Sch; Bulama Kabbi; Gedaba Pri. Sch
Bayo	Wuyo	Wuyo Pri. Sch. I; Guburnde Pri. Sch.; Laro Pri. Sch.; Chibra Pri. Sch.; Geidam Pri. Sch.; Tashan Tsamiya Pry. Sch; Fanguru; Wuyo Pri. Sch. II
Bayo	Zara	Zara; Dogon Zaga; Nyawi Pri. Sch.; Bambarka; Tenteni
Biu	Buratai	Buratai Pri. Sch. I; Buratai Dispensary; Bamburatai Gate; Wachambara; Buratai Pri. Sch. II; Kumaya, Bulama Gate; Chara, Bulama Gate; Kurnari, Bulama Gate; Warawara, Bulama Gate; Mangari, Bulama Gate; Sabon Gari, Bulama Gate; Burashika, Bulama Gate; Alagarno, Bulama Gate; Dewa, Bulama Gate
Biu	Dadin Kowa	Gunda Pri. Sch.; Gunda, Bulama Gate; Njibi Pri. Sch.; Njibi, Bulama Gate; Galabinda, Bulama Gate I; Galabinda, Bulama Gate II; Madaki, Bulama Gate; Madaki Pri. Sch.; Madaki Maiduguri, Bulama Gate; Maiduguri; Nafada; Bantine; Thlakthla; Berum; Dadinkowa; Gaidam; Duzuwa Pri. Sch.; Panana; Panana Wama; Dam; Wuyaku
Biu	Dugja	Dugja Pri. Sch. I; Dugja Pri. Sch. II; Mataga Photos; Bature Mai Unguwa; Alhaji Musa Gaidam Gate; Tabra Pri. Sch.; Tabra, Bulama Gate; Tsahuyam Bulama; Wakama Pri. Sch; Wakama Bulama; Tum Pri. Sch.; Hizhi Gwaram; Dauda Hamza Gate; Mini Haha Pri. Sch.; Dugja Market Road; Biu Magistrate; Biu High Court; Brikuthli Sanda I; Brikuthli Sanda II; Brikuthli Valley; Brikuthli Zara Miringa I; Brikuthli Zara Miringa II; Brikuthli Daurau; Brikuthli Nepa; Brikuthli Centre
Biu	Garubula	Madlan Pri. Sch.; Sabon Gari Sokotowa; Bumsa; Kore; Charangi; Mapi; Taksaku; Maradi; Garubula Sabon Pri. Sch.; Garubula Dispensary; Wula; Garubula Tsoho; Danaski; Bulakulo; Bumbulum; Zuwa
Biu	Gur	Gur Lawan Pri. Sch.; Lawan Gate; Gur Garubula; Zira Bulama Jakwa; Zira Gudugu; Kimba Central; Kimba Village; Sabon Layi; Chikwarkir; Garin Mallam I; Gur Lawan Bulama; Garin Mallam II
Biu	Kenken	Galdimare Pri. Sch. I; Galdimare Pri. Sch. II; Gamji Pri. Sch.; Ajiya Garga Gate; Sanitation Office; Mallam Gauraki Gate; Yahaya Barber Gate; Kapinta Wandali Gate; M. D Lawan Gate; Nasarawa Bulama Gate; Jugwal Bulama Gate I; Jugal Bulama Gate II; Kampala I; Kampala II; Old Gamji Pri. Sch.; Galdimare Alh. Yamta; Galdimare Bulama Gate I; Galdimare Muazu; Galdimare Bulama Gate II
Biu	Mandara Girau	Mandara Girau Pri. Sch.; Bulama Hussaini; Bulama Musa; Lawan Gate I; Nguma Pri. Sch.; Nguma Bulama; Garkida Tawul; Ngilu I; Liya Pri. Sch.; Liya Bulama; Tarfa; Diwa; Debiro Pri. Sch.; Sura; Ngilu II; Lawan Gate II
Biu	Miringa	Miringa Central Pri. Sch. I; Miringa Central Pri. Sch. II; Alhaji Mallum Gate; District Head Office I; Lawan Gate; Dashu B. Gate; District Head Office II; Dashu Pri. Sch.; Bulama Kuma; G. G. S. S. S Miringa; Yoksa Pri. Sch.; Wakil Mustapha; Wakil M. Sarki Aska; Mai Unguwa M. Waya; Miringa Dispensary; Prison Gate; Jali Fulani; Jali . B Gate; Pompomari Pri. Sch.
Biu	Sulumthla	Agency Office; Post Office; Forestry Office; Bariki Pri. Sch.; Bukar Kwaira Gate; Nadabo Gate; Madu Gaji Gate I; Madu Gaji Gate II; District Head Office; Dispensary; Ali Dugul Gate; Zaifada I; Kachalla Pada Gate I; Moh'D Naida Gate; Shettima Ali Gate; Yamta Birma; Inuwa Ali Damashu; Zaifada II; Kachalla Pada Gate II
Biu	Yawi	Filin Jirgi Pri. Sch.; Filin Jirgi Bulama Gate; Usman Dala Gate; Kigir Gate I; Kigir Gate II; Kabura Pri. Sch.; Yelwa Bariki; Wurang; Yawi Bulama Gate I; Yawi Bulama Gate II; Viukuthla; Kurnar Ngwa; Mbulachiui; Yawi Pri. Sch.
Biu	Zarawuyaku	Bulama Fori; Mbulamel B. Dauda; Maiunguwan Dankual; Bubal Wada Pri. Sch. I; Bubal Wada Pri. Sch. II; G. S. S Waka; Yamar Kumi Pri. Sch.; Yamirkumi B. Gate; Maina Hari Pri. Sch.; Maina Hari Bulama G.; Mandafuma Pri. Sch.; Mandafuma Dispensary; Bambwala Pri. Sch.; G. S. S. Biu; Central Pri. Sch; Kachalla Bukar; Remind Home; Maidugu. Islamiya; Alhaji Modu Fantami; Alhaji Dauda Makaniki; Waziri Gate
Chibok	Chibok Garu	Lawanti; Yobe; C. B. S; Kwigu; Yaga Butu; Ngwamba; Shiki
Chibok	Chibok Likama	Piying; Musa Birma; Bila Lawan Ali; Bila Nyadar
Chibok	Chibok Wuntaku	Bila Audu I; Bila Audu II; Bila Hikima; Mboa B. Hyelampa; Kople; Kwada B. Grema; Bwala Gyang; Kople B. Muta; Hirpaya B. Muta; Njilang; Bamzir
Chibok	Gatamarwa	Bila Karaga; Bila Mohammed I; Bila Mohammed II; B. Wadir; B. Dawa; B. Dzakwa; B. Pogu; B. Gajeri; B. Amdudar; B. Abana I; B. Abana II; B. Kachalla
Chibok	Kautikari	B. Ndabaram; B. Wadir; B. Mallam; B. Jatau Yahi I; B. Jatau Yahi II; B. Watsai; B. Yibram; Kwada; Nguro Dina; Birnin Ngizu I; Birnin Ngizu II; Bula
Chibok	Korongilim	Bambula; Korongilim Zarma; K. Kwibula; Kwada Yang; Yarchida; Bula Shettima; Bula Kagu III&IV; Korongilim
Chibok	Kuburmbula	Kuburmbula M. Bularam I; Kuburmbula M. Bularam II; Kaumuta Yahi; Kagilmari; Kagilmari / Kwada; Mifa I; Mifa II; Bwarakila; Kuburmbula Bwaftari I; Kuburmbula Bwaftari B. Baffa
Chibok	Mbalala	Jajel; Mbalala B. Tambiya; Ngadarma; Ngorkoli; Kauthlama I; Kauthlama II; Korochuma; Mbalala I; Mbalala II; Bila Tambiya; Danga I & II
Chibok	Mboa Kura	Mboa Kura; M. Tabang; M. Kuchani; B. Gapani; M. Munza; M. B Mai; Gangrang
Chibok	Shikarkir	Bila Yaga; B. Gaji; Tsatha; Kwihuma; Takulashi; Dabiya
Chibok	Pemi	Pemi Bila Ali I; Pemi Bila Ali II; Pemi B. Talawur; Pemi B. Kyari; Pemi B. Ngiladar; Pemi B. Lawan; Pemi B. Yukura
Damboa	Ajign (A)	Ajigin Mairi I; Ajigin Mairi II; Auma; Hong; Shettima Abogu; Ndoksa; Chirelia; Ajigin Bulamari; Galmasku; Bulbul
Damboa	Ajign (B)	Talala B. Kolomi; Malumti; Gorgore; Talala Pri. Sch.; Gorgori Pri. Sch.; Goramcha
Damboa	Azur/Multe/Forfor	Kauji Pri. Sch. A; Kauji Pri. Sch. B; Azur Lawanti; Multe Lawanti; Sabon Gari; Wajiroko; Forfor; Mulgula; Sokotoko; Koboa; Mungule
Damboa	Bego/Yerwa/Ngurna	Mufurundi; Bego; Koljiri; Njaba; Yarwa; Gazama; Ngirna Lawanti; Mude; Kangarwa
Damboa	Damboa	Damboa Lawanti; State Low Cost; Fertilizer Store I; Fertilizer Store II; Ajari / Alkaliri I; Ajari / Alkaliri II; Magistrate Court; Bulama Burarti I; Bulama Burarti II; Shuwari I; Shuwari II
Damboa	Gumsuri/Misakurbudu	Gumsuri I; Gumsuri II; Garjan; Wovi; Kurbutu/Misa; Komdi; Kaya I; Kaya II; Litawa; Balakar
Damboa	Kafa / Mafi	Kafa Lawanti; Mangusum; Jemari; Kauwaram; Golgi; Buk; Mafi Lawanti; Kafa Kugula; Bulama A. Kaulama
Damboa	Mulgwai / Kopchi	Shamagai Malari; Bulajilan; Ngwalimiri; Ndagu; Kwamgilari; Izzige; Kilakesa; Mulgwai Lawanti; Ba'Ale; Yazza; Shawa; Malamri
Damboa	Nguda / Wuyaram	Hausari Pri. Sch.; Nzuda Malaharam; Nzuda Mairi; Sabon Gari Kauji; Anakwari; Matangale; Buwori Alimiri; Malaharam B. Bukar; Muyamram Kasuwa; Kachalla Burari
Damboa	Wawa / Korede	Karede Lawanti; Adika; Kinzagiraji; Wawa Lawanti; Abuluti/Luwa; Bulajimbam; Gorgube; Dusula; Koljiri Korede; Kasuarawa; Tusuwa; Abulam Pri. Sch.
Dikwa	Boboshe	Boboshe I; Boboshe II; Tabudge; Sigabaja I; Sigabaja II; Dubula; Bulanguwa Maibe; Kobtara; Mijigite; Kodawu; Garno
Dikwa	Dikwa	Dikwa Central Pri. Sch.; Rabiri; Chingo Zarmabe; Kanumburi Jaja'A Bo; Community View Centre; Nguro Kuluwu Kacheji I; Nguro Kuluwu Kachei II; Shehu Sanda Pri. Sch. I; Shehu Sanda Pri. Sch. II; Shiwari; Bulabulin Pri. Sch.; Kasugula; Moulanda; Cross Dandal; Ajari West; Kilagaru Pri. Sch.
Dikwa	Gajibo	Gajibo View Centre; Gajibo Pri. Sch.; Gamaye; Ma'A; Ngabure I; Ngabure II; Lera; Gajbo Dispensary; Moula Dandal
Dikwa	Ufaye / Gujile	Ufaye Pri. Sch.; Chigide; Bulun Guwa Fadabe; Koibe Kura; Gole Ye; Kashimiri; Ardori; Bone Cross Dandal
Dikwa	Muliye / Jemuri	Muliye Dandal; Muliye Pri. Sch.; Masa Dandal I; Masa Dandal II; Ngubdori; Adushe; Durbe
Dikwa	Mudu / Kaza	Mudu Kaza Pri. Sch.; Mudu Lawanti; Isari Pri. Sch.; Muzuguli Pri. Sch. I; Sulala Pri. Sch.; Kaza Pri. Sch.; Mutugu Pri. Sch.; Dumure Dandal; Muzuguli Pri. Sch. II
Dikwa	Mallam Maja	Mallam Maja Pri. Sch.; Mukdala Pri. Sch. I; Mukdala Pri. Sch. II; Mukdala Pri. Sch. III; Chingowa Pri. Sch.; Mureye Pri. Sch.; Gimeye / Tamposhe; Malla Maja Dandal
Dikwa	Ngudoram	Ngudoram Pri. Sch.; Maima Pri. Sch.; Antul Pri. Sch.; Ajiri Dandal; Antul Pry. Sch.; Ajiri Pri. Sch.; Ngudoram Dandal
Dikwa	Magarta / Sheffri	Magarta Pri. Sch.; Jingori; Gimeye; Dalori Kura; Jejeme; Gosoma
Dikwa	Sogoma / Afuye	Afuye Pri. Sch.; Kudiye Pri. Sch.; Sogoma Pri. Sch. I; Sogoma Pri. Sch. II; Jiye Pri. Sch.; Isari Dandal; Fala - Fala; Cha'A Bulabulin
Gubio	Ardimini	Bam Kuruwu; Kolo Kusumiri; Lawanti I; Lawanti II
Gubio	Dabira	Fanta Mallumti; Juwula; Lawan Aliri; Lawanti I; Lawanti II; Moruri
Gubio	Felo	Gudum; Gundi I; Gundi II; Lawanti; Shattaram I; Shattaram II; Yana Zannari
Gubio	Gamowo	Bamma Gana I; Bamma Gana II; Bamma Gana III; Lawanti I; Lawanti II; Burari
Gubio	Gazabure	Abachari; Abba Sherifti I; Abba Sherifti II; Dusuwa I; Dusuwa II; Gallo; Kindaumari I; Kindaumari II; Kidaumari II; Lawanti I; Lawanti II; Tuja Gallo; Yaumari I; Yaumari II
Gubio	Gubio Town I	Ajari I; Ajari II; Alkaliri I; Alkaliri II; Budum I; Budum II; Bussamiri I; Bussamiri II; Bussamiri III; Gagawa I; Gagawa II; Gamosuno; Gadairam; Market Area I; Market Area II; Market Area III; Market Area IV; Market Area V; Kwayamti; Mallam Kachallari
Gubio	Gubio Town II	Bazam Pompomma I; Bazam Pompomma II; Dispensary I; Dispensary II; Dispensary III; Dispensary IV; Gallamu; Jattori; Kuluimari; Motor Park I; Motor Park II; Motor Park III; Ngortowa
Gubio	Kingowa	Dunga I; Dunga II; Jilwari; Kachallari; Kingowa Pri. Sch. I; Kingowa Pri. Sch. II; Kuwa Shettimari; Maiduri
Gubio	Ngetra	Aisaram I; Aisaram II; Awanari I; Awanari II; Diffan; Gandasko I; Gandasko II; Goni Kadirti I; Goni Kadirti II; Goni Kadirti III; Kayowa I; Kayowa II; Lawanti I; Lawanti II; Mallam Sulumti I; Mallam Sulumti II; Musari I; Musari II; Ngetra Lawanti
Gubio	Zowo	Bam Ngudorom I; Bam Ngudorom II; Gadurari; Goni Aliri; Karan Ganamari; Koleri; Lawanti; Masho Ganamari I; Masho Ganamari II; Zanna Durumari; Zowo Lawanti
Guzamala	Aduwa	Aduwa Lawanti I; Aduwa Lawanti II; Moworam; Hassanti
Guzamala	Gudumbali East	Central Pri. Sch.; Dispensary I; Dispensary II; Gudurmari I; Gudurmari II; Ajari I; Ajari II; Dunari; Shila'A; Aisa Ka'A; Kattana; Kadiya
Guzamala	Gudumbali West	Aliyari; Bosamma Fomfom; Garanda; Jabure; Karna Dungulti; Karna Gabchari; Kosorok
Guzamala	Guworam	Aji Dalari; Bossamma; Kiji Matari; Guworam; Lingir
Guzamala	Guzamala East	Goni Adamti; Goni Mustafari; Goni Suguri; Ibrahimti; Kafi Sungul; Ngollam; Yaganari
Guzamala	Guzamala West	Borom Bul; Bulama Moduri; Birniri; Guzamala Dispesary; Guzamala Pri. Sch.; Kingiri Kura; Mallam Gambori; Malloram; Zannari
Guzamala	Kingarwa	Ali Zurgumari; Buwa Goniri; Furtuwa; Jaurori; Kingarwa Lawanti I; Kingarwa Lawanti II; Kurnawa; Luma Surowa; Shettimari
Guzamala	Mairari	Ali Gambori; Goni Abbari; Kadigre; Goni Usmanti; Mairari I; Mairari II; Kingarwa Gana
Guzamala	Moduri	Ajari; Buwura; Dawutiri; Malari; Moduri; Tamale
Guzamala	Wamiri	Bolori; Guworam Gana; Kawou; Koshiri; Wamiri Lawanti; Nalwodo
Gwoza	Ashigashiya	Kamburwa Pri. Sch.; Shehu Naga; Ali Gwama I; Ali Gwama II; Alhaji Buladi; Mahamma Ghide; Central Pri. Sch.; Gwadale Pri. Sch.; Ndale Naji; Lawan Bukar
Gwoza	Bita / Izge	Izge I; Izge II; Izge III; Ali Bukar; Lawan Asariya; Isa Vandu; Innagu Pri. Sch.; Munagu Afami; Butuku Pri. Sch.; Kwamda; Ali Dogo; Baidu Chollomi I; Baidu Chollomi II; Lawan Goniri; Chinda Afunfuma; Adam Gado; Apagu Mallam; Ngoma Bukar; Bula Jieya; Purthang; Kavili
Gwoza	Dure / Wala / Warabe	Ali Wasa; Wala Health Clinic; Zalida Mbimba; Tada Ngamtuko; Sudiya Wisso; Warabe Pri. Sch.; Lawan Warabe; Biye Katale; Kiva Pri. Sch.; Ndufa; Kumangrechigile; Usman Gumbuko; Ali Njele; Usman Tanko; Bulama Hassan; Dure Pri. Sch.; Bulama Amdaga; Bula Kache; Adamu Tuje; Kumbo Kamba; Bulama Halut; Ngabura Pri. Sch.; Bulama Yalade; Late Lawan Gila
Gwoza	Gavva / Agapalwa	Gavva Kitakwa; Bulama Ezekiel; Gavva Pri. Sch.; Lawan Ahmed; Moh'D Kitakwa; Umaru Kitakwa; Ibrahim Wiviva; Adamu Garba; Philimon Nduka I; Philimon Nduka II; Dzahallava Zhazha; Agapalawa Pri. Sch.; Lawan Abubakar; Attagara Pri. Sch. I; Attagara Pri. Sch. II; Aganjara; Jibrilla Pri. Sch.; Bukar Dabbo I; Bukar Dabbo II
Gwoza	Guduf Nagadiyo	Messeger Audu; Ngaya Huffa; Ghada Pri. Sch.; Guduf Leze Pri. Sch.; Shabaka Yagala; Tada Hudugwe; Sabon Gari Nagadiyo Pri. Sch.; Bulama Idris I; Bulama Idris II; Yakubu Thupuwa; Bulama Digshare; Guduf B. Yagwa Pri. Sch.; Bulama Musa Gombe I; Bulama Musa Gombe II; Bulama Wura; Ghada Nghathe; Ghufare Nghathe; Vurda Hirke; Duma Bulama Mohammed; Kambe Bajah; Tappa Wura Kidiaye; Mina Bulama Mbitsa; Kimbe Kwedenga
Gwoza	Gwoza Town Gadamayo	Jatau Pri. Sch.; Library Board; Central Pri. Sch. I; Central Primary School II; Hassan Suno; Audu Likita; Viewing Centre; Alhaji Abba Tata; Hamman Adama Jaje; Alhaji Abubakar Bul; Hamman Arvare; Ahmadu Dudu; Alhaji Ibrahim Abiso; Umaru Gwaya; Alhaji Saidu Kitho; Umaru Putaya; Govt. Day Sec. Sch.; Adamu Wachine; Late Ali Biu; S/Gari Pri. Sch; Suleiman Mai Kifi; Mallam Bakari; Musa Tada
Gwoza	Gwoza Wakane / Bulabulin	Usman Nugho I; Usman Nugho II; Makera I; Makera II; Alhaji Wada; Buba Mainasara; Audu Tada Diyawe; Gwoza Wakane Pri. Sch.; Late Lawan Dalhatu; Abubakar Dawe; Ali Nijdda; Abuabakar Ndawayo; Haruna Lamar; Luhva Pri. Sch; Bukar Kumbo; Nuhu Dawe; Fadagwe L. Kyari; Fadagwe Muni; Low Cost; Bulama Buba Gwaja
Gwoza	Hambagda/ Liman Kara/ New Settlement	Jaje Pri. Sch.; Bulama Tela; Liman Kara Pri. Sch.; Wakili Sule Ardo; Ishaku Humba; Uvaha Pri. Sch.; Abubakar Garba; Lawan Yerima; Ahmadu Gweme; Galtha Chagaman; Patawe Pri. Sch.; Haruna Garandawa; Hudugum Pri. Sch.; Lawan Musa; Salihu Mbimba; Umaru Toko; Sabon Gari Zawva; Tashan Gwegwe; Lokodisa; Gava West I; Gava West II; Umaru Taskala; Valengede; Modu Hussaini; Blawaziri; Lemu; Gori; Bulama Bakeri
Gwoza	Johode/Chikide/Kughum	Garba Shigwa; Fagha Marwa; Daga Wurto; Daga Wurto II; Ali Ivwaha; Ayuba Ngiva; Pritha; Barawa Pri. Sch.; Hige Ndassa; Barawa Pige; Chikida Pri. Sch. I; Bulama Ruwa; John Jaha; Haruna Gulavgha; Garba Thaghaka; Bitrus Njiga; Bulama Ngaya; Kughum Sama'A; Kughum Pri. Sch.; Sagha; Gwa'A Pri. Sch.; Ibrahim Ndasa; Chikida Pri. Sch. II; Zuwara Kwere
Gwoza	Kirawa/Jimini	Kirawa S/Gari Pri. Sch.; Mohammed Namida; Bulama Sanda; Kirawa Pri. Sch. I; Ramadan Yadi I; Ramadan Yadi II; Ramadan Yadi III; Kirawa Nomadic Pri. Sch.; Mallam Hassan; Malah Dugje; Kirawa Pri. Sch. II; Bulama Naga Baya; Samari Kamba I; Central Pri. Sch. I; Samari Kamba II; Central Pri. Sch. II; Ndaba Pri. Sch.; Takwa Dakache; Kushe-Kushe Pri. Sch.; Dugje Naga
Gwoza	Kurana Bassa/Ngoshe - Sama'A	Bala Pegi I; Bala Pegi II; Bala Kamba; Dahaya Tada; Hudumcha Pri. Sch.; Ndawa Yiyagha; Ngaruwa Meke; Parshaka; Kitha Kwalika; Garba Vunge; Umaru Amthe; Diri Diffa; Dilha Didawa; Shehu Kurama; Mahdi Uryo; Ngoshe Sama'A Pri. Sch.; Musa Takaskala; Takwashe
Gwoza	Ngoshe	Ngoshe Lahupara Pri. Sch.; Mohammed Diya; Ngoshe Aiga Pri. Sch.; Bulama Aiga Duwara; Veterinary Clinic; Area Court; Bulama Ali Zhigaga; Ngoshe Central Pri. Sch.; Philibus Gavara; General Hospital
Gwoza	Pulka/Bokko	Pulka Central Pri Sch I; Pulka Central Pri Sch II; Abubakar Bokko I; Abubakar Bokko II; Viewing Centre; Mburza; Michael Zuka; Majuwane Pri. Sch.; Zake Dalle; Alfred Indale; Augustine Goma; Zare Yaga; Ibrahim Mugie; Suleiman Duge; Abdullahi Kamba; Bokko A. Pri. Sch.; Bokko S/Gari Pri. Sch.; Bukar Bingil; Bokko Timta; Alhaji Yakubu Ali
Hawul	Bilingwi	Huma Central I; Huma Central II; Gwanzang; Damu Danaka; Sabon Gari; Huma Dispensary; Fuma; Huma East; Wadar; Gwaski
Hawul	Dzar/ Vinadum/ Birni/ Dlandi	Dzar I; Grim/Dzar/Vinadum/Birin/Dlandi; Gwamya; Dlandi; Grim; Birni; Bakundum; Pakuthla; Malila; Muduksuku; Tashan Gauta; Vinadam I; Vinadam II
Hawul	Gwanzang Pusda	Gwangzang Pri. Sch; Bilatum I; Bilatum II; Mbulatawiwi I; Mbulatawiwi II; Chata; Tawasu; Yaulari; Pusda; Wuyaku; Kundiring; Ngilangshimtu; Warni; Tuwakari; Samari
Hawul	Hizhi	Subwang; Wtc I; Tasha Maina Gate; Hizhi/Bwala; Unguwan Abdullahi II; Bwala; Dibarmi; Teba; Dangula; Pethlabu; Azare I B. Usman; Azare II Kaku; Azare III; Hizhi; Yaragi; Wtc II
Hawul	Kida	Bulama Abdullahi; Kida I; Kida II; Garkwi; Garha Pry Sch.; Bwali Katau; Kinging I; Kinging II; Yimirshika Central Pry. Sch.; Gwagoli Bulawa Gate; Bulama Daniel
Hawul	Kwajaffa/Hang	Kwajaffa Central; Kwajaffa Bura; Kwajaffa Dispensary; Garbwala; Jibwhiwhi; Dalwa; Gan Shaffa; Koguwulatu; Harang; Tashan . Alade I; Tashan . Alade II; Tashan . Alade III; Debiro; Pelachiroma; Kirbutu I; Kirbutu II; Yimirkila
Hawul	Kwaya-Bur/Tanga Rumta	Kwaya Bura I; Kwaya Bura II; Kwaya Bura III; Kwaya Bura IV; Moram; Tsakuyam; Dusu; Mulbiya; Tanga Ramta; Durkwa; Bwala Posinkir; Billa Minta; Ndiragina; Kwamba; Pirdla
Hawul	Marama/Kidang	Kidang I Pry Sch; Kidang II Agric. Office; Kidang III Kofar Lawan; Azare Piti; Humusu; Pirkisu; Katsina I; Katsina II; Katsina III; Dikira; Pikilama
Hawul	Pama/Whitambaya	Pama I; Pama II; Giraba; Dzamtikar; Dizarpoa I; Dizarpoa II; Whitambaya I; Whitambaya II; Labu I; Labu II; Bantali; Mindi Posira
Hawul	Puba/Vidau/Lokoja	Saboda Allah; Kukurpu; Palabirni; Puba; Gwallam I/Wakdam; Gwallam II; Hyera Central Pry. Sch; Hyera South II Central Pry. Sch.; Landas I; Landas II; Kwagu; Lokoja I; Lokoja II; Gelavirwa
Hawul	Sakwa/Hema	Sakwa I; Sakwa II; Sakwa III; G. G. S. S Sakwa; Malang; Agga Bura; Ngwa I; Ngwa II; Pella Olla; Hema I; Hema II; Tanga - Rahi; Ndaraku
Hawul	Shaffa	Gula I; Gula II; Tiraku Pry. Sch.; Shinduffu Pry. Sch.; Kwagushar; Gauza/Gwagumaigera; Nyalku Pry. Sch.; Bamjikil; Nyalku Shaffa East I; Nyalku Shaffa East II; Shaffa South; Bakin Kasuwa Alh. Mamman Gate; Viewing Centre; Unguwan Buba; Shaffa Central
Jere	Alau	Lawanti I; Lawanti II; Logeji; Mainari I; Mainari II; Koreri; Talbari; Abba Isari; Modu Yari; Fanamari; Limanti; Nguwari
Jere	Bale Galtimari	Lawanti I; Lawanti II; Lawanti III; Giwa Barracks; Assembly Quarters; Fagoli; Kellumiri; Bale Kura; Ali Diwari; Bulama Umara; Bulama Jidda I; Bulama Jidda II; Jidari Bus Stop I; Jiddari Bus Stop II; Jiddari Bus Stop III; Moloi Shuwari; Moloi Kanuribe
Jere	Dala Lawanti	Dala Pri. Sch. I; Dala Pri. Sch. II; Dala Bulama . M; Dala Dispensary; Dala Umarari; Salumiri Pri. Sch.; Mainari Kanuribe; Malari Fuguri
Jere	Dusuman	C. B. D. A I; C. B. D. A II; C. B. D. A III; Farm Centre; Kolori Aliri; Wudimari; Kirbiri Basheti; Kirbiri Masheti; Dusuman H. Pri. Sch.; Dusuman Lawanti I; Dusuman Lawanti II; Bulamari; Maimeleri Kosheri; Kolari Bulamari; Muna Dalti; Bulama Duri
Jere	Gongulong	Lawanti Bulamari; Gongulong Pri. Sch.; Gongulong Lawanti; Gumsuri; Wattini; Modu Ajiri I; Modu Ajiri II; Hassanti; Kasa'A Kura
Jere	Maimusari	Modu Kumsher; Tahir Mechanic; Gomari Bus Stop I; Gomari Bus Stop II; Gomari Bus Stop III; Bulama Gumnari I; Bulama Gumnari II; Alhaji Bello I; Alhaji Bello II; Alhaji Modu Ya'Jibe; Bukar Gado I; Bukar Gado II; Alhaji Audu Wakil; Falmata Kwayam I; Falmata Kwayam II; Gomari Pri. Sch.; Falmata Kwayam III; Falmata Kwayam IV; Gomari Pri. Sch. I; Gomari G. Pri. Sch. II; Bulama Gambo; Mustafa Gambo I; Mustafa Gambo II; Layin Makaranta; Mallam Abba Aji I; Mallam Abba Aji II; Isa Ngoshe; Alh. Ali Shuramre; Alh. Modu Jakana; Kusuwan Dare; Gambo Jarawa
Jere	Mashamari	Alhajiri I; Alhajiri II; Modu Gambo I; Modu Gambo II; Goni Gingimi I; Goni Gingimi II; Mustafa Ali Gaji; Bulama Mustapha Kime; Mele Kolo; Alhaji Gagara; Maina Kyari; Goni Modu Gofari; Bulama Kachalla I; Bulama Kachalla II; Bulama Tahir; Custom Staff Qtrs; Sanda Kyarimi; Bukar Soja I; Bukar Soja II; Bukar Soja III; Bukar Bulama; Gujja; Abba Lawan; Lawan Mala Biukar; Zanna Musa; Mashamari Pri. Sch; Alhaji Adam; Bulama Bukar M.; Dandal Kukawa; Block 6; Bulama Halla; Goni Modu Bulama; Alhaji Maikifi; Alhaji Bulama Burtu I; Bulama Burtu II; Bulama Gubdo
Jere	Ngudaa/Addamari	Bulama Yaro I; Bulama Yaro II; Bulama Yaro III; Bulama Dogo Kadai I; Bulama Dogo Kadai II; Bulama Dogo Kadai III; Bulama Dogo Kadai IV; Mumbili Dispensary; Shayar Fulani; Bulama Moh'D Maishayi; Addamari; Nguranam Kolle; Massari / Gide; Bulama Shettima; Bulama Ibrahim; Bulama Bukar
Jere	Old Maiduguri	Keteler I; Keteler II; Bulama Isa Kois; Maduguri Clinic I; Maduguri Clinic II; Maiduguri Clinic III; Maiduguri Clinic IV; Toma Shuwa I; Toma Shuwa II; Toma Shuwa III; Mallam Kalli I; Mallam Kalli II; Baba Kura Driver; Hajia Hadiza Lawan I; Hajia Hadiza Lawan II; Alhaji Tahir Ahmed I; Alh. Tahir Ahmed II; Alh. Mustafa Lawan; Alh. Mohammed Jimba; Bulama . Alhaji Umara; Alhaji Babagana Shettima; Bulama Modu Isamari; Alhaji Bunu Tela I; Alhaji Bunu Tela II; Laraba Market I; Laraba Market II; Laraba Market III; Bulama Modu Bolibe; Bulama Shettima; Bulama Bura Kukawa; Alhaji Ibrahim; Biriri Alhajiri; Kaka Yachanam
Jere	Tuba	Gumtai; Bulama A. Ali's; Bulama Modu Kachari; Tuba Jiddari; Makulwe
Jere	Mairi	Bulama Isa; Maimusari Pri. Sch. I; Maimusari Pri. Sch. II; Lawan Usman; Bulama Kachallah I; Bulama Kachallah II; Mairi Palace Hotel; Bulama Baitu; Wakili Usman; Bulama Bukar I; Bulama Bukar II; Bulama Kadiri I; Bulama Kadiri II; Bulama Kawu; Unimaid Pri. Sch.; Unimaid Clinic I; Unimaid Clinic II; Unimaid Clinic III; Bulama Hala; Umth Security Hall I I; Umth Security Hall II; Umth Security Hall III; F. G. C Visitor's Room; Dalori Housing Est. Pri. Sch.
Jere	Gomari	Ndollori; Bulama Jidda I; Bulama Jidda II; Bulama Jidda III; Ajilari Bulamari; Modu Jakana; Gomari Bus Stop I; Gomari Bus Stop II; Gomari Bus Stop III; Ahmadu Ladan; Alh. Ali Kantima I; Alh. Ali Kantima II; Goni Mustapha; Moh'D Isa Bahausa; Usman Abba Amira I; Usman Abba Amira II; Bulama Baba Shuwa I; Bulama Baba Shuwa II; Bulama Baba Shuwa III; Ashinga Jara Shuwa; Usman Mohammed; Mohammed Chenchero; Baba Gajere; Bulama Modu Dapcheri I; Bulama Modu Dapcheri II; Alh. Bukar Longo; Behind Haji Camp I; Behind Haji Camp II; Behind Haji Camp III; Gomari Dispensary
Kaga	Afa/Dig/Maudori	Mauli Pri. Sc./Maudori Mauliye; Maudori Pri. Sc./Maudori Lawanti; Afa Pri. Sch./Afa Lawanti; Wazub / Wazub; Kanamma / Kanamma; Awanari / Awanari; Lawanti Palace / Digimari Lawanti; Digimari Pri. Sch. / Digimari I; Digimari Dispensary / Digimari II; Munye Pri. Sch. / Munye Kura
Kaga	Benisheikh	Mallamti / Mallamti; Benisheikh Gana / Benisheikh Gana; District Head Office / Ajari I; Low Cost Pri. Sch. / Ajari II; Magistrate Court / Ajari III; Wakilti Palace / Ajari IV; Viewing Centre / Viewing Centre; Central Pri. Sch. / Central Pri. Sch.; Adult Education Office / Lawanti I; Lawanti Palace / Lawanti II; Shopping Complex A / Market Stall I; Shopping Complex B / Market Stall II; Tamandara / Tamandara
Kaga	Borgozo	Borgozo Pri. Sch. / Borgozo Lawanti; Tamdane / Tamdane; Karna - Kasa Pri. Sch. / Karna Kasari; Mastamari / Mastamari
Kaga	Dogoma / Jalori	Jalori Pri. Sch. / Jalori Lawanti; Dogoma Pri. Sch. / Dogoma Lawanti; Bulamari / Dogoma Bulamari; Kombolori Pri. Sch. / Kombolori
Kaga	Dongo	Dongo Pri. Sch. / Dongo Lawanti; Shettimanuri / Shettimanuri; Kodowu Pri. Sch. / Kodowu
Kaga	Galangi	Market Stall / Galangi I; Galangi Mairi / Galangi II
Kaga	Guwo	Guwo Pri. Sch. / Guwo Lawanti I; Lawanti Palace / Guwo Lawanti II; Za'Kurari / Za'Kurari
Kaga	Karagawaru	Karagawaru Pri. Sch. / Karagawaru I; Lawanti Palace / Karagawaru II; Fajari / Fajari; Gangawa M. Malaye / Gangawa M. Malaye
Kaga	Mainok	Targajeri / Targajeri; Lawanti Palace / Lawanti I; Mainok Pri. Sch. / Lawanti II; Market Stall / Market Stall I; Motor Park / Market Stall II; Bulama Mustapha / Bulama Mustapha I; Bulama Mustapha / Bulama Mustapha II; Bulama Aboremi / Bulama Aboremi; Dandalmari Pri. Sch. / Dandalmari
Kaga	Marguba	Marguba Pri. Sch. / Marguba Lawanti; Ngumari / Ngumari I; Ngumari - Warsala / Ngumari II; Kwayari Pri. Sch. / Kwayari Kura; Abukarti / Abukarti
Kaga	Ngamdu	Tamsu Kawu Pri. Sch. / Tamsukawu; Yangebari / Yangebari; Ngamdu Pri. Sch. / Lawanti I; Lawanti Palace / Lawanti II; Viewing Centre / Lawanti III; Alhajiri / Alhajiri; Kombomiri / Kombomiri I; Kombomiri / Kombomiri II; Mallam Shettimari / Mallam Shettimari I; Mallam Shettimari / Mallam Shettimari II; Goni Lawanti / Goni Lawanti; Shopping Complex / Market Stall I; Shopping Complex / Market Stall II; Ma'Amari Kaya'A / Ma'Amari I; Ma'Amari / Ma'Amari II; Dabira / Dabira
Kaga	Shettimari	Shettimari Dispensary / Shettimari I; Shettimari Pri. Sch. / Shettimari II; Ngurmai / Ngurmai I; Ngurmai / Ngurmai II
Kaga	Tobolo	Tobolo Pri. Sch. / Tobolo Lawanti I; Tobolo Viewing Centre / Tobolo Lawanti II; Modu Kururi / Modu Kururi; Alinmari / Alinmari; Sheruri / Sheruri; Anumdoliya / Anumdoliya
Kaga	Wajiro / Burgumma	Wajiro Pri. Sch. / Wajiro Lawanti; Makinta Kururi Pri. Sch. / Makinta Kururi I; Makinta Kururi Lawanti Palace / Makinta Kururi II; Duwari / Duwari I; Duwari/Duwari II; Burguma Pri. Sch. / Burguma I; Burguma Lawanti Palace / Burguma II
Kaga	Wassaram	Wassaram Lawanti Palace / Wassaram I; Wassaram Pri. Sch. / Wassaram II; Yabal Pri. Sch. / Yabal
Kala Balge	Moholo	Assaba I; Assaba II; Dugum; Mariye; Dagile; Gujjari; Moholo
Kala Balge	Jilbe \A\'	Jilbe Market I; Jilbe Market II; Jilbe Pri. School; Kulkule; Dugume; Gazalful; Lafiya; Chawa
Kala Balge	Jilbe \B\"/Koma Kaudi"""	Holenge; Koma Kaudi; Koma; Koma Sabaye; Kurfu; Kumba I; Kumba II; Rumele
Kala Balge	Jarawa/Sangaya	Jarawa; Malari; Tiwa; Khulibari; Sabba; Sangaya
Kala Balge	Kala	Ambliya; Bok; Juwe; Kala Dispensary; Kala Primary; Meleri; Sideri; Utuma
Kala Balge	Kumaga	Kumaga Lawanti; Kumaga Primary; Kalfa Kumaga; Kalma Sabaye; Sero; Gulfo
Kala Balge	Rann \A\'	Rann Pri. School I; Rann Pri. School II; Wumbi Mairi I; Wumbi Mairi II; Abari; Amsuburu I; Amsuburu II; Durbani; Tilam; Wumbi Dispensary I; Wumbi Dispensary II; Isari; Rann Dispensary; Wumbi Primary; Rann Ajari
Kala Balge	Rann \B"/Daima"	Atti; Budul; Daima; Fandiski; Tunishe; Hijelishe; Tata Kura; Dugumashe; Malumri; Addari; Sabkara; Ngaiwa
Kala Balge	Mada	Gabulga; Gilgil; Mada; Misherde; Musari; Sausawa; Kilangilawa
Kala Balge	Sigal/Karche	Abonumere; Wuli Kura; Bukkari; Bula- Aminabe; Bulong; Masano; Sadigo; Shilo I; Shilo II; Sigal Dispensary; Sigal Lawanti; Sigal Pri. School; Baba Jalki; Karche Pry. Sch; Karche Bulamari; Makandiri
Konduga	Auno / Chabbol	Auno Pri. Sch. Auno; D / Head Office, Near D / Head Office; Kuwa Ngwali, Kuwa Ngwali; Ya'Na Yasku, Yana Yasku; Chabbol Pri. Sch., Chabbol; Chabbol Lawanti, Chabbol Lawanti I; Chabbol Lawanti, Chabbol Lawanti II; Chabbol Kura, Chabbol Kura; Shiwari, Shiwari; Zarmari, Zarmari; Fashar Pri. Sch., Fashar; Tungushe, Tungushe; Abba Kashimri, Abba Kashimri; Pompomari Pri. Sch., Pompomari I; Pompomari Pri. Sch., Pompomari II; Pompomari Pri. Sch., Pompomari III; Bulama Madu, Jajel B. Madu; Jajel Pri. Sch., Jajel; Njimtilo, Njimtilo; Jajel Bukarti, Jajel Bukarti; N. A. F Station, N. A. F Station; Magaramti, Magaramti
Konduga	Dalori / Wanori	Kajeri Pri. Sch., Kajeri; Amarwa Pri. Sch., Amarwa; Sheriff Tamsuwa, Sheriff Tamsuwa; Mairari Pri. Sch., Mairari; Usumanti, Usumanti; Dengelti, Dengelti I; Dengelti, Dengelti II; Dalori Pri. Sch., Dalori; Dalori R / Room, Dalori; Dalori Dispensary; Isari I; Isari II; Wanori Pri. Sch., Wanori; Kambari, Kambari; Mairi Pri. Sch., Mairi I; Mairi Pri. Sch., Mairi II
Konduga	Dawa East / Malari / Kangamari	Kaigamari Pri. Sch., Kaigamari; Sama'A, Sama'A; Wutoro, Wutoro; Yandandari, Yandandari; Malari Pri. Sch., Malari; Malari Lawanti, Malari Lawanti; Malari Dispensary, Malari Dispensary; Sheriff Ladua, Sheriff Ladua I; Sheriff Ladua, Sheriff Ladua II; Mallam Sungunti, Mallam Sungunti; Dalwa East Pri. Sch., Dalwa East; Sheriff Kyariri, Sheriff Kyariri; Abduri, Abduri; Sheriff Mallumri, Sheriff Mallumri; Gudusuri, Gudusuri; Old Kaigamari, Old Kaigamari
Konduga	Jewu / Lamboa	Jakana Pri. Sch., Jakana I; Jakana Pri. Sch., Jakana II; Kadamari, Kadamari; Jakana Malambe, Jakana Mallambe I; Jakana Malambe, Jakana Mallambe II; Jewu Pri. Sch., Jewu I; Jewu Pri. Sch., Jewu II; Bidiri, Bidiri; Abba Sunori, Abba Sunori; Goni Bukarti, Goni Bukarti; Bunya, Bunya; Lamboa Lawanti, Lamboa Lawanti; Jakana Pri. Sch. Jakana III; Frai Fulatari, Frai Fulatari
Konduga	Kawuri	Kawuri Pri. Sch., Kawuri I; Kawuri Pri. Sch., Kawuri II; Kawuri R / Room I, Kawuri; Lawan Meleri Pri. Sch., Lawan Meleri; Kashimiri I, Kofar Lawan; Kashimiri II, Pri. Sch.; Aulari Pri. Sch., Aulari Pri. Sch.; Gangare, Alhajiri Gangare; Aulari Pri. Sch. II, Aulari; Kawuri R / Room, Kawuri R / Room I; Kawuri R / Room, Kawuri R / Room II; Shettimari Pri. Sch. I; Shettimari Pri. Sch. II; Maidugurmari, Pri. Sch.; Fuguri, Fuguri; Kusham Kura, Kusham Kura; Kusham Gana, Kusham Gana; Kuramari, Kuramari
Konduga	Kelumiri / Ngalbi Amari / Yale	Kellumiri Pri. Sch. I; Kellumiri Pri. Sch. II; Ngalbi Amari Pri. Sch., Ngalbi Amari I; Ngalbi Amari Pri. Sch., Ngalbi Amari II; Yale Pri. Sch. I; Yale Pri. Sch. II; Yale Pri. Sch. III; Gamboram, Gamboram; Gabchari, Gabchari; Ka'Anari, Ka'Anari; Masta Gujari, Masta Gujari; Mallam Sulumri, Mallam Sulumri; Ngauramari, Ngauramari
Konduga	Konduga	Konduga Central Pri. Sch., Konduga; Viewing Centre, Viewing Centre I; Leprosy Clinic, Leprosy Clinic; Central Pri. Sch., Central Pri. Sch.; Viewing Centre II; Viewing Centre III; Secretariat I; Secretariat II; Secretariat III; Upper Area Court, Upper Area Court; Mandurari Pri. Sch. I; Mandurari Pri. Sch. II; Mandurari Pri. Sch. III; Towairi, Towairi; Goniri, Goniri; Bulabulin, Bulabulin; Modu Amsamuri; Zarmari; Amusuri; Sabongari; Konduga Central Pri. School
Konduga	Mairamri / Yeleri / Bazamri	Mairamri Primary School, Mairamri I; Mairamri Primary School, Mairamri II; Walimiri, Walimiri; Lawanti Pri. Sch., Lawanti I; Lawanti Pri. Sch., Lawanti II; Ngaurawa, Ngaurawa; Yaleri Pri. Sch., Yaleri; Galmari, Galtimari; Moshimari, Moshimari Kunube; Budungeri, Budungeri; Makintari, Makintari; Bazamri Pri. Sch., Bazamri; Yauri, Yauri; Arnari, Arnari I; Arnari, Arnari II; Yabal, Yabal; Mborori; Muktari; Bukar Kurari
Konduga	Masba / Dalwa West	Masba Pri. Sch., Masba I; Masba Pri. Sch., Masba II; Gumsuri, Gumsuri; Tumbalwa, Tumbalwa; Bulabulin, Ngaura I; Bulabulin, Ngaura II; Maudari, Mudari I; Maudari, Mudari II; Musunne, Musunne; Alagarno, Alagarno; Masta Fantanari, Masta Fantanari; Talbari, Talbari; Dalwa West Pri Sch. I; Dalwa West Pri Sch. II; Ngalidowa, Ngalidowa; Kofa, Kofa; Ibrahimti, Ibrahimti; Kaduwa, Kaduwa
Konduga	Nyaleri/Sandia/Yejiwa	Nyaleri Pri. Sch., Nyaleri; Bulabulin Ngau. Dis, Bulabulin Ngau. Dis.; Jirinna, Jirinna; Falawanne, Falawanne; Sandia Pri. Sch., Sandia; Sudan Ngudibe, Sudan Ngudibe; Kaya Bulabulin, Kaya Bulabulin; Ngauramari, Ngauramari; Ngarannam, Ngarannam; Yajiwa Pri. Sch. I, Yajiwa Pri. Sch. I; Ka'Almari, Ka'Almari I; Ka'Almari, Ka'Almari II; Jedede, Jedede; Shashamari, Shashamari; Abulam Pri. Sch., Abulam Pri. Sch.; Kukuruk, Kukuruk; Yajiwa Pri. Sch. II, Yajiwa Pri. Sch. II
Konduga	Sojiri/ Nguro - Nguro	Ajiri Pri. Sch. I, Ajiri Pri. Sch. I; Ajiri Pri. Sch. II, Ajiri Pri. Sch. II; Nguro Nguro, Nguro Nguro; Madu Kawuri I, Madu Kawuri I; Madu Kawuri II, Madu Kawuri II; Kayamla Pri. Sch. I, Kayamla Pri. Sch. I; Kayamla Pri. Sch. II, Kayamla Pri. Sch. I; Kayamla Pri. Sch. III, Kayamla Pri. Sch. III; Kayamla Pri. Sch. IV, Kayamla Pri. Sch. IV; Sojiri Pri. Sch. I, Sojiri Pri. Sch. I; Sojiri Pri. Sch. II, Sojiri Pri. Sch. II; Camp, Camp; Kimeri, Kimeri; Abbari, Abbari; Musa Kalari, Musa Kalari
Kukawa	Alagarno	Alagarno Pri. Sch.; Ngurtuwa; Kangarwa Pri. Sch. I; Tumbin Sanyi; Doron Naira; Alhaji Chindori; Shuwaram; Abuja; Kumburi Market West; Kangarwa Pri. Sch. II
Kukawa	Baga	Mile Four; Darba Shata; Bunduram; Baga Lawanti; Bujumari Daleye; Kumburi; Bulabulin; Bulama Adamti I; Bulama Adamti II; Baga Viewing Centre
Kukawa	Bundur	Bundur Lawanti; Nafasa
Kukawa	Dogoshi	Dogoshi Lawanti; Kwatan Dogoshi I; Kwatan Dogoshi II
Kukawa	Doro / Duguri	Doro / Duguri Dunba; Tubin Barebari; Kaiye Kura; Kolleram; Wal - Wal Kura; Kuwilileya; Massaram; Madayi; Duguri; Daban Lami; Tetewa; Kingallam; Kasugula I; Kasugula II; Doro Bakin Kwalta; Doro Fish Market
Kukawa	Kauwa	Cross Kauwa Viewing Centre; Cross Pri. Sch.; Dabar Giawa; Bulama Bature; Kauwa Lawanti; Karwaram; Tumbin Yashi
Kukawa	Kekeno	Kekeno Lawanti; Mile Ninety; Malam Baiyeri; Daban Masara; Daban Gajere; Kwatan Daban Masara I; Kwatan Daban Masara II; Tudun Naira; Daban Masara Dispensary
Kukawa	Kukawa	Kukawa Pri. Sch. I; Kukawa Pri. Sch. II; Kukawa Dispensary; Kukawa Lawanti; Kukawa Viewing Centre; Mangari; Bashari; Dunblam; Kaine; Goni Sulumti; Kesakolkolla; Kuski; Guwema
Kukawa	Moduari / Barwari	Moduari / Barwati; Barwati; Garin Baba Gana
Kukawa	Yoyo	Yoyo Lawanti; Yoyo Fatoma; Aida Kuraram
Kwaya / Kusar	Gondi	Wandali Pri. Sch. I; Wandali Pri. Sch. II; Wandali K. Lawan; Tudun Wada; Minta Wandali Pri. Sch.; Simsira K. Bulama; Katsina K. Bulama
Kwaya / Kusar	Gusi / Billa	Gusi Pali Barka Pri. Sch.; Gusi K. Lawan; Kubo Gusi K. Bulama; Gusi Dunkur Pri. Sch.; Guburde Billa; Bila Fika Pri. Sch.; Bila Kogu Pri. Sch.; Mindikutuki Pri. Sch.; Bila Kogu K. Bulama; Gaidam K. Bulama; Kwathlang K. Bulama
Kwaya / Kusar	Guwal	Guwal Pri. Sch. I; Guwal Pri. Sch. II; Guwal K. Garga; Jalingo I; Jalingo II; Savira
Kwaya / Kusar	Kubuku	Kubuku Pri. Sch. I; Kubuku Pri. Sch. II; Hema Pri. Sch.; Dayar Pri. Sch.; Dzathu Pri. Sch.; Dayar Kulthi Salihu
Kwaya / Kusar	Kurba	Kurba Pri. Sch.; Kurba Dispensary; Jugal K. Bulama; Tashan Gambo; Laro K. Bulama; Zobi K. Bulama; Yumbu Pri. Sch.
Kwaya / Kusar	Kwaya Kusar	Kwayakusar Pri. Sch. I; Kwayakusar Pri. Sch. II; E. P. I Office; Kofan Hakimi; Maina Ali Zobi; Bakin Kasuwa I; Bakin Kasuwa II; Gadam Pri. Sch.; Guba Pri. Sch.; Gashina Pri. Sch.; Jafi Pri. Sch.; Maiba Pri. Sch.
Kwaya / Kusar	Peta	Peta Pri. Sch.; Peta Dispensary; Kunathlang Pry. Sch; Moko Jakali; Moku K. Bulama; Yaulari Pri. Sch
Kwaya / Kusar	Wada	Wada Pri. Sch.; Wada K. Bulama; Milda Pesing Pri. Sch.; Milda Galadima; Milda Jakali; Pankilang; Kogu K. Bulama
Kwaya / Kusar	Wawa	Wawa Pri. Sch.; Wawa K. Bulama; Mbula K. Bulama; Magunta K. Bulama; Gundula
Kwaya / Kusar	Yimirthalang	Yimirthlalang Pri. Sch. I; Yimirthlalang Pri. Sch. II; Yimirthlalang Dispensary I; Yimirthlalang Dispensary II; Bahai Pri. Sch.; Biladzi Pri. Sch.; Lesga K. Bulama; Garin Kare Kare
Mafa	Abbari	Abbari; Moboshe; Zangabe I; Zangabe II
Mafa	Anadua	Anadua; Ajiri Pri. Sch. I; Ajiri Pri. Sch. II; Boskoro
Mafa	Gawa	Dogumba I; Dogumba II; Gawa I; Gawa II; Kajeri; Gumshe; Ma'A Kasuwa
Mafa	Koshebe	Koshebe I; Koshebe II; Koshebe III; Koshebe IV; Ngudda I; Ngudda II; Kulburam
Mafa	Laje	Laje Pri. Sch. I; Laje Pri. Sch. II; Ajiri Lawanti; Maska Lawanti; Laje Bulwa
Mafa	Loskuri	Loskuri Pry. Sch; Loskuri Lawanti; Ngowom Pri. Sch.; Ngowom Bulamari; Baleri Pri. Sch.; Baleri Bulamari; Jalta Kawu; Ali Ganari Pri. Sch.
Mafa	Ma'Afa	Ma'Afa I; Aza Baimaram; Azabaimari; Aza - Nguro
Mafa	Mafa	Mafa Central Pri. Sch. I; Mafa Central Pri. Sch. II; Bulamari I; Bulamari II; Dongo; Mafa Ajari
Mafa	Masu	Masu Pry. Sch; Chingowa; Ma A Fainde; Ma, A Sheriffti; Ma'A Burni; Mbutta Pri. Sch.
Mafa	Mujigine	Mujigine I; Mujigine II; Awada I; Awada II; Momo I; Momo II; Signabaya I; Signabaya II; Signabaya III; Signabaya IV; Kaltaram; Maskate; Ba'Ale; Giskilla; Kudo Mukdo
Mafa	Tamsu Ngamdua	Tamsu - Ngamdua I; Tamsu - Ngamdua II; Margimari I; Margimari II; Mala Kyariri I; Mala Kyariri II; Zannari I; Zannari II; Zannari III; Zannari IV
Magumeri	Ardo Ram	Ardoram Pry. Sch I; Ardoram Pry Sch II; Ngollomari; Ka'Ashiya
Magumeri	Ayi / Yasku	Ayi Lawanti; Yasku Lawanti; Mursala I; Mursala II
Magumeri	Borno Yesu	Borno Yesu Pri. Sch. I; Borno Yesu Pri. Sch. II; Busuguna; Nyam - Nyammaram; Shashiya; Ladi Isa Ngudiye I; Ladi Isa Ngudiye II
Magumeri	Furram	Furram Pri. Sch.; Bam Chira'A; Ghuskur
Magumeri	Gaji Ganna I	Gaji Ganna Lawanti; Gaji Ganna Pri. Sch.; Police Station (Near); Gaji Ganna Police Station; Sugunti; Kar Nowa
Magumeri	Gaji Ganna II	Suria Retin I; Suria Retin II; Titiwa Bulama Mastafa I; Titiwa Bulama Mastafa II; Kurmeri I; Kurmeri II; Abatcha Fandiri
Magumeri	Hoyo / Chin Gowa	Chingowa Lawanti (Jalori); Chin Gowa Pri. Sch.; Maramari; Wuryemiri I; Wuryemiri (Goni Kimeri) II; Kuwami
Magumeri	Kalizoram / Banoram	Banoram Pri. Sch.; Banoram Dispensary; Ali Gajiri; Modu Kurari; Kaliari; Kalizoram
Magumeri	Kareram	Galtaru; Kareram Dungari; Bulabulin
Magumeri	Kubti	Kubti Lawanti; Kubti Dispensary; Kubti Summari I; Kubti Summari II; Bukar Majiri I; Bukar Majiri II
Magumeri	Magumeri	Ajari; Kasugula; Ngurmai; Fantamiri; Ngaburawa; Malari I; Malari II
Magumeri	Ngamma	Ngamma Pri. Sch.; Malam Mairari I; Malam Mairari II; Malam Mairari III; Malam Umarari I; Malam Umarari II; Ngamma Dispensary
Magumeri	Ngubala	Ngubala Pry Sch; Jaddadari; Bamma Pri. Sch.; Bamma Dispensary(Kodengeri); Shettimari
Maiduguri M. C.	Bolori I	Alh. Bulama Modu I; Alh. Bulama Modu II; Alh. Tahir; Alh. Tahir Lawanti; Goni Tijani I; Goni Tijani II; Bulama Ardo I; Bulama Ardo II; Mallam Karube I; Mallam Karube II; Goni Garba Buzu; Yusufu Bulama I; Yusufu Bulama II; Tsoho Mai Kwano I; Tsoho Mai Kwano II; Fed. Low Cost Pri. Sch. I; Fed. Low Cost Pri. Sch. II; Pela Super Market I; Pela Super Market II; Baga Road Motor Park; Mai Adashe; Alh. Bunu Churo Kusko; Vendor Desk (Fed. Low Cost Junction); Post Office I (Fed. Low Cost); Post Office II (Fed. Low Cost); Chibok Close (Pompomari Qtrs); Bulama Shuwari I; Bulama Shuwari II; New Hope Nursary I (Fed. Low Cost ); New Hope Nursary II (Fed. Low Cost ); Bulama Kyari Musari; Bulama Mustapha M. Umairi; Bri. Maimalari Day Sec. Sch. I; Bri. Maimalari Day Sec. Sch. II; Opp. D / 23, Fed. Low Cost Qtrs.; Bolori Pri. Sch. I; Bolori Pri. Sch. II
Maiduguri M. C.	Bolori II	Bulama A. Mohammed I; Bulama A. Mohammed II; Mallam Baba Ohoye I; Mallam Baba Ohoye II; Bulama Bukar Tela; M. Sale Jajiri I; M. Sale Jajiri II; M. Sale Jajiri III; Zajiri Govt. Day Sec. Sch. I; Zajiri Govt. Day Sec. Sch. II; Zajiri Govt. Day Sec. Sch. III; Zajiri Pri. Sch. I; Zajiri Pri. Sch. II; Modu Tela; Zajiri Dispensary I; Zajiri Dispensary II; Bulama Bukar Telah; Bulama Kolo; Ali Kotoko I; Ali Kotoko II; Ali Kotoko III; Bulama Kashim; Zari Modu; Hajja Zara; Bulama Tahiru; Bulama Alh. Bunu Telah; Bulama Abdu Mohammed; Alh. Umara Mamman I; Alh. Umara Mamman II; Alh. Umara Mamman III; Bulama Malah; Bulama Modu Shuwa I; Bulama Modu Shuwa II; Bulama Alh. Sulum I; Bulama Alh. Sulum II; Bulama Mari; Bulama Abba Makinta I; Bulama Abba Makinta II; Bulama Kallah; Bulama Alh. Maina; Near Bore Hole; Bulama Ali Usman I; Bulama Ali Usman II; Bulama Garba Mohammed I; Bulama Garba Mohammed II; Bulama Boleya I; Bulama Boleya II; Bulama Boleya III; Alhaji Awi Mandara; Army Children Pri. Sch. I; Army Children Pri. Sch. II; Bulama Talba; Bulama Ali I; Bulama Ali II; Bulama Goni Kyari; Bulama Diya; Bulama Goni Goroma I; Alh. Modu Goni Ngarnam; Bulama Goni Goroma II; Bulama Ngarannam; Bulama Bukar Birkila; Bulama Kabajan; Bulama Mele; Modu Gana Mustpha; Bulama Ali Sulum; Bulama Aji; Goni Damgari; Alhaji Goni Kyari
Maiduguri M. C.	Bulablin	Goni Abdulsalam, Bulabulin; Alh. Tahashoma, Bulabulin; Bulabulin; Alh. Sheriff Dizalma, Bulabulin; Filling Bola, Bulabulin; Ali Fika, Bulabulin; Mallam Dungus, Bulabulin; Mamman Goroma, Bulabulin I; Ali Duwari, Bulabulin; Alh. Garba Satomi I; Alh. Garba Satomi II; Bulama Madu I; Bulama Madu II; Tuja Kuraman I; Tuja Kuraman II; Bula Bulin Dispensary I; Bula Bulin Dispensary II; Abba Aji; Alh. Sulaiman; Adamu Miyo; Mamman Goroma II; Bukar Budum; Alh. Mamman Gashua. Bulabulin; Alh. Modu Bulama Bulabulin; Alh. Mamman Goroma III; Alh Modu Gana; Abatcha Umar; Monday Market Round About; Baba Pada; Kagel Mari Police Station; Lamisawa Gate; Umar Bulama; Ali Baitalma; Alh. Modu Ngoya; Alh. Bukar Kukareta; Alh. Abatcha Kawari; Alh. Hamza Tabaco; Kullogumna Pri. Sch.; Tijani Dan Haya; Alh. Umar Dala; Karama Kuturu I; Karama Kuturu II; Goni Bukar Goche; Lawan Musa; Adamu Dan Kolluri; Bulabulin Day Sec. Sch.
Maiduguri M. C.	Fezzan	Alh. Abakos; Alh. Ibrahim Imam; Alh. Sheriff Sanda; Lawan Hassan; Mustapha Katifama; Baba Kura Yusuf I; Baba Kura Yusuf II; Furmari; Alh. Bukar Mulima; Bazambari; Aji Modu Ngaji; Alh. Dori; Ibrahim Adumi I; Ibrahim Adumi II; Bashir's Frontage; Furmari Mosque II; Mustapha Kachalla
Maiduguri M. C.	Gamboru Liberty	Alh. Mamman Dan Shuwa I; Alh. Mamman Dan Shuwa II; Waziri Gwoza I; Waziri Gwoza II; Alh. Kashim I; Alh. Kashim II; Alh. Tahir; Bulama Kangadi; Bundum Pri. Sch.; Abba Ali Kaka Gida; Bulama Ali Musa; Malam Usman Abubakar Kaduna; Malam Bukar Bololoma I; Malam Bukar Bololoma II; Boy Scout Premises; Lawan Mala Ali Liberty; Bulama Kyari Bukar I; Bulama Kyari Bukar II; Alh Modu Ngubdo; Bulama Mongunoma; Gamboru Alhajiri Pri. Sch. I; Gamboru Alhajiri Pri. Sch. II; Abba Aji Sudan I; Abba Aji Sudan II; Tandari (Remand Home) Gate I; Tandari (Re'Mand Home) Gate II; Mai Anuguwa's Gate I; Mai Anguwa' S Gate II; Bulama Mustapha; Abba Gana Benishiek; Bulama Meremi's Gate I; Bulama Meremi's Gate II; Fulatari; Bulama Modu; Alh. Wasili I; Alh. Wasili III; Mallam Usman Mai Kachallah; Alh. Zakariya Musa; Alh. Kolomi Mai Kanti I; Alh. Mamman Dilar; Alh. Konto (Bosco Road); Alh. Kolomi Mai Kanti II; Dandal Police Qtrs; Alh Usman Zango Koya; In front Of Sahara Hotel
Maiduguri M. C.	Gwange I	Bulama Jidda Moh'D; General Moh'D Shuwa; Bulama Alh. Kangadi; Alh. Magira Tom; Umar Mustapha; Goni Habu I; Goni Habu II; Bulama Abba; Alhaji Adamu Jikan Ladi I; Alhaji Adamu Jikan Ladi II; Wakil Usman; Alh. Maikanti; Alh. Modu Fugura; Sheikh Ibrahim Sale; Alh. Zawami; Alh. Yakwami; Usman Ali Shuwari; Alh. Audu Adam; Abdulkadir Isa; Bulama Alhaji Hassan I; Bulama Alhaji Hassan II; Mallam Lawan; Mallam Goni Usman; Alh Grema Tailor I; Alh Grema Tailor II; Gwange II Pri. Sch.; Alh. Hassan Karen Gusau I; Alh. Hassan Karen Gusau II; Bulama Ali Daji; Waziri Modu; Alh. Ibrahim Dutse; Lawan's Gate; Alhaji Maina Umar; Zanna Bukar Mandara I; Zanna Bukar Mandara II; Alkali Mustapha; Bulama Umoru; Sergant Hassan Wakil; Alhaji Bunu Shriff; Alhaji Makinta; Alh. Uban Kare; Alh. Murtala; Alh. Babbale; Alh. Baba Umoru; Goni Baitu Ma'Ajir; Youth Centre; Zanna Bukar Dipcharima; Alh. Sani Mai Lemo
Maiduguri M. C.	Gwange II	Alh. Ali Kuyima I; Alh. Ali Kuyima II; Bulama Karubu I; Bulama Karubu II; Goni Ibrahim; Alh. Modu Kulloma; Alh. Modu Kura Maimai; Goni Bukar Kolo; Gwange . IV. Pri. Sch.; Alh. Abba Ali Bosoma I; Alh. Abba Ali Bosoma II; Bulama Goni Bukar; Alh. Ali Kidaji; Bulama Modu Tamsuwa I; Bulama Modu Tamsuwa II; Captain Adamu Shuwa; Adamu Mai Chemist; Mallam Hussaini Darman; Bulama Abbas; Ramatu Ngaloma; Baba Mustapha Premier; Bulama Ali; Ya Hajja Kwayam; Alh. Garba Andasa; Sehttima Ali Kidaji; Mustapha Gwange I; Mustapha Gwange II; Hajja Mai Tuwon Yasin; Alh. Usman Tabacco I; Alh. Usman Tabacco II; Zanna Ibrahim; Alh. Sanusi; Alh. Ibrahim D. P. P Noma; Alh. Manu Mai Kifi; Alh. Tukur Waziri; Alh. Sule Idrissa; Alh. Modu Benishiek; Gwange Area Court I; Gwange Area Court II; Alh. Kawu; Alh. Bukar Umar; Goni Bukar; Ya - Lau - Lau; Goni Modu Shettima; Mustapha Amsatabe; Zarma Driver; M. Kollo Tailor; Hajiya Laraba; Bulama B. Ngoma; Former Naira Club Hotel
Maiduguri M. C.	Gwange III	Alh. Zanna Ibrahim Gujba I; Alh. Zanna Ibrahim Gujba II; Winner Chemist; Alh. Kyari; Bulama Usman; Baba Meremi; Alh. Isa Marghi; Alh. Umar Marte; Alhaji Musti; Mallam Usman I; Mallam Usman II; Alh Modu Njammaina I; Alh Modu Njammaina II; Mallam Usman III; Alh. Ali Ngubdo; Bulama Ali; Bulama Mustapha D. Kyari; Gwange Pri. Sch. III; Bulama Abba Umar; Alh. Konto; Ambassador Mahmud Ahmed; Hajja Mairo Mai Tuwo I; Hajja Mairo Mai Tuwo II; Bulama Wakil Kadai; Alh. Abba Kaka Yerima; Alh. Ali Tabacco; Alh. Garba Doctor; Alh. Bashir; Alh. Modu Kofa; Goni Modu Fanta Kurmi; Makinta Modu; Alh. Bukar Dantrader; Goni Shettima; Goni Tijjani; Alh. Ali Gegeya I; Alh. Ali Gegeya II; Zanna Masu; Mustapha Ali Gubio; Modu Malari; Alh. Awana Dilar; Lawanti's Gate; Press Centre Junction New G. R. A; Former Baba Goni Machina's Gate; Adamu Daya
Maiduguri M. C.	Hausari/Zango	Sir Kashim Area I; Sir Kashim Area II; Kofar Bulama - I; Kofar Bulama - II; Alh. Bukar Kunduli; Bukar Bintumi Tela; Mallam K. Mohammed I; Mallam K. Mohammed II; Mallam Modu Tambari I; Mallam Modu Tambari II; Alhaji Bamus Gate; Alhaji Ishaku Tela; Alhaji Jibrin Usman; Alhaji Usman Danladi; Opposite Kofar Lawan; Alhaji Garba Kano; Bulama Makinta; Battaiya Area; Modu Sulum; Hausari Primary School; Alhaji Modu Alhaji Hassan; Alhaji Mustapha Haruna; Alhaji Mikos Gate; Alh. Zangina I; Alh. Zangina II; Unguwar Tsakiya/Duriya Tanda; Alhaji Dan Iya Dawala I; Alhaji Dan Iya Dawala II; Balama Shettima; Ahmed Borko; Yunus Adisa Zango; Alhaji Mustapha; Bukar Gaidam I; Bukar Gaidam II; Alhaji Tsoho Maikano; A. Goni Muktar; Alhaji Mai Uda; Murtala Mai Wake; Hajja Zango; Modu Dadabe; Ishaku Haruna; Alhaji Mala Dangel; Abba Tar Kagalmari I; Abba Tar Kagalmari II; Dogo Banana; Lamisawa Pharmacy
Maiduguri M. C.	Lamisula/Jabba Mari	Shettima Ali Kidaji; S. A. Kura; Alhaji Aja Bukar; Alhaji Bulama; Idrissa Kadi I; Idrissa Kadi II; Nura Dap I; Nura Dap II; Lawan Mamud I; Lawan Mamud II; Hajja Ashe; Alhaji Mai Goro I; Alhaji Mai Goro II; Mallam Mamman; Bukar Doctor I; Bukar Doctor II; Alhaji Bukar Hajjabe; Bulama Mallam Grema; Umar Lawan Hoto; Alhaji Adam; Alhaji Modu Kellube; Alhaji Baba Gana; Alhaji Kukawa; Alhaji Ali Garshinga; Foundation Hospital; Alhaji Abba Kaka; Mallam Bukar; Shettima Hassan I; Shettima Hassan II; Goni Boskori; Bulama Yakubu; New Prison Yard; State Low Cost Primary School I; State Low Cost Primary School II; State Low Cost Primary School III; Baba Shehuri; Bulama Ibrahim; Railway Station; Umaru Wampa; Lami Sula Primary School; Alhaji Ali Kumshe I; Alhaji Ali Kumshe II; Idrissa Bultu; Alh. Mamman Bukar; Alh. Zaram Gogaram I; Alh. Zarma Gogogram II; Malam Fantami; Lamisula Pri. Sch. I; Lamisula Pri. Sch. II; Wulari Court; Behind Police Quarters; New Bulama Wulari I; New Bulama Wulari II; Ramat Car Park I; Ramat Car Park II; Malam Garba Sule; Wulari Pri. Sch.; Old Bulama Wulari I; Old Bulama Wulari II; Bulama Kyari I; Bulama Kyari II; Wulari Bus Stop; Mohammed Ali; K. I. C. O. E I; K. I. C. O. E II; G. G. S. S Yerwa; Police Pri. Sch. I; Police Pri. Sch. II; Bulama Yahaya Ahmed; Government College
Maiduguri M. C.	Mafoni	Babayo Muyi Bello; Alh. Babayo Muyi; Yerwa Central Pri. Sch. I; Yerwa Central Pri. Sch. II; Alh. Ramat; Alh. Mustapha Wanzam; Yerima Boyi I; Yerima Boyi II; Alh. Mustapha; Bukar Mafoni; Mamman Jajere; Baba Modu Amsami; Alh. Adamu Jallapma Mafoni I; Alh. Adamu Jallapma Mafoni II; Alh. Mallam; Bundi Goroma I; Bundi Goroma II; Umara Kulloma; Ahmadu Alh. Haruna; Bulama Bale; Goni Modu G/K; Goni Umar; Umara Bujima; Bukar Bagalemi; Modu Maltumi Kulloma Mafoni; Alh. Kallah; Abba Yusuf I; Abba Yusuf II; Abba Ali Bultube I; Bulami Mustaphabe; Abba Ali Bultube II; Bulama Mustapha; Mustapha Mallumbe; Hayatu Jere; Zanna Kyari Masu; Alh. Mustapha Ali Bama; Zanna M. Karube; Alh. Kyari; Baba Modu Gubio; Wali Usman
Maiduguri M. C.	Maisandari	Govt. House I; Govt. House II; Commissioner's Qtrs I; Commissioner's Qtrs II; Commissioner's Qtrs III; Lagos House; Opp. Shehu Garbai; International Pri. Sch. I; International Pri. Sch. II; International Pri. Sch. III; Bulama Hassan; Bulama Jalo I; Bulama Jalo II; Bulama B. Laduma I; G. R. A Pri. Sch. I; G. R. A Pri. Sch. II; Maidokiri I; Maidokiri II; Bulama Bukar Kunduli; G. S. S Maiduguri I; G. S. S Maiduguri II; Police College Qtrs I; Police College Qtrs II; Police Barracks; Bulama Gabchia I; Bulama Gabchia II; Bulama Mustapha Kura; Bulama Alh. Kurna I; Bulama Alh. Kurna II; Govt. Girl's. College; G. G. C Staff Qtrs; Bulama Modu Bukar I; Bulama Modu Bukar II; Bulama Bukar Kolo; Maduganari Pri. Sch. I; Maduganari Pri. Sch. II; Bulama Shuaibu I; Bulama Shuaibu II; Shettima Immigration; Bulama Gabchia III; Gaji Chemist; Bulama Bukar Mohammed; Shuwari Maternity Clinic I; Shuwari Maternity Clinic II; Bulama Mele; Bulama Usman; Bulama Jidda; Bulama Jalaba I; Bulama Jalaba II; Bulama Abdullahi Ibrahim; Bulama Bukar Shuwari; Alh. Aminu Layin Rijiya; Alh. Sambo Mohammed; Alh. Mai Shayi; Bulama Ali Fantami I; Bulama Ali Fantami II; Layin Tsamiya I; Layin Tsamiya II; Adamu Mai Kifi; Bulama Mamman Shettima; Bulumkutu Shamfami (B. M); Bulama Bukar; Kangadiri; Kulluluri (Damboa Road); Bulama Kulluluri Alhajiri; B Ulama Suleiman; Bulama Mumini I; Bulama Mumini II; Mohammed Maina; Bulama Mohammed Zarami; Bulama Jidda I; Bulama Jidda II; Bulama Aisa; Alh. Bukar Suleimanti; Sanda Kolomi; Near Borehole I Bulumkutu Tsallake; Near Borehole II Bulumkutu Tsallake; A - Goni Gashiya I; A - Goni Gashiya II; Bulama Modu Lami Sula; Alh. Mohammed Mai Motor; Lawali Bello I; Lawali Bello II; Bulama Modu Abatcha I; Bulama Modu Abatcha II; Layin Kartomi; Bulama Ngubdo; Bulama Ishaku; Bulama Mele Mohammed; Bulama Yamani; Bulam Ibrahim I; Bulam Ibrahim II; Yajiwa B. A Malabe; Bulama Shipta Bajidari; Baba Saje; Alh. Mustapha Talabe I; Alh. Mustapha Talabe II; Mallam Kyari; Bulumkutu Pri. Sch.; Modu Sullumuri
Maiduguri M. C.	Shehuri North	Goni Ahmadu; Wakil Kundili; Shehu Buramti; Abba Ibrahim I; Abba Ibrahim II; Nimeri Kawar Maila; Kawar Maila I; Kawar Maila II; Gangamari I; Gangamari II; Abbaganaram Pri. Sch.; Mele Zangoma I; Mele Zangoma II; Bulama Kaura; Opposite Liaison Office; Abba Kuttu Kuttu I; Abba Kuttu Kuttu II; Dala Company I; Dala Company II; Abbaganaram Market I; Abbaganaram Market II; Aji Modu Kura; Alh. Umar Na Alh. Lawan - Shehuri; Kangamari; Bulama Kauri; Goni Fantami; Kaigamari; Gindin Tsamiya; Mairari I; Mairari II; Muktar Bukar I; Muktar Bukar II; Zanna Kunduli; Moromti; Alh. Kellumi; Bulama Zarami; Bulama Zarabe; Chief Imam I; Chief Imam II; Goni Dare I; Goni Dare II; Bulama Zanna Kolo I; Bulama Zanna Kolo II; Masta Ngilaiya I; Masta Ngilaiya II; Zanna Bukar Bunube I; Zanna Bukar Bunube II; Lawanti I; Lawanti II; Galadima Maidunoma
Maiduguri M. C.	Shehuri South	Alh. Mallam Saina Bashir / Shehuri South; Alh. Sadiq; Lawan Ashiek; Ali Gwange; Goni Ali Habu; Talbari I; Talbari II; Shettima Musa; Engine Katako; Wakil Maulut; Waziri Ibrahim I; Waziri Ibrahim II; Kazalmari; Wakil Baba Gana; Malah Cham Cham; Malah Bukar; Baba Bukar Fari; Ganye Shida; Bulama Tijjani I; Bulama Tijjani II; Old Prison Gate; Abba Garba I; Abba Garba II; Yerima's Gate
Marte	Ala	Ala Dispensary I; Ala Dispensary II; Ala Pri. Sch. I; Kaje Pri. Sch. I; Kaje Pri. Sch. II; Al - Banya; Lumshe; Ma'Asa
Marte	Alla Lawanti	Alla Pri. Sch.; Alla Lawanti; Malalewa I; Malalewa II; Runde I; Runde II; Moforo; Ngubdori
Marte	Borsori	Borsori Pri. Sch; Mashilla Bensuwe; Yedi; Badairi Barrah; Goduram; Kusuma; Alinna A. Chibbo
Marte	Gumna	Gumna; Ilewa; Kuza'A
Marte	Kabulawa	Kabulawa; Ka'Ala Kolo; Gremari Kanoriye; Ajiri Zairowa; Kadari Matal
Marte	Kirenowa	Kirenowa Pri. Sch. I; Kirenowa Pri. Sch. II; Kirenowa Pri. Sch. III; Kirenowa Pri. Sch. IV; Kirenowa Market I; Kirenowa Market II; Guma'A Bula Bulin; Maimusari I; Maimusari II; Maimusari III; Gagarawa; Bukar Mairambe I; Bukar Mairambe II; Tumbumma
Marte	Kulli	Kulli Pri. Sch. I; Kulli Pri. Sch. II; Daula; Bulameleri I; Bulameleri II; Momo Kura; Alam Dori; Maula Chingona; Muntuna; Mama Kura; Zuwa
Marte	Marte	Marte Central I; Marte Central II; Viewing Centre; Ajari; Aja'A Kura; Gumma Kura; Bulawo I; Bulawo II; Chuku Ngubdo I; Chuku Ngubdo II; Magarta; Bula Butube; Jillam; Burniski
Marte	Mawulli	Mauwalli Pri. Sch.; Wubza Kura; Mugum; Duro; Inulwa
Marte	Musune	Musune Pri. Sch.; Garadai Pri. Sch. I; Garadai Pri. Sch. II; Garadai Market; Saula Pri. Sch.; Muksa; Nyanya Pri. Sch.; Kamzomo; Kamzomo Pri. Sch.
Marte	Ngeleiwa	Ngileiwa Pri. Sch.; Badairi Pri. Sch. I; Badairi Pri. Sch. II; Badairi Market; Kilabaliya; Mbuluwa; Doron Buhari; Jibrillaram I; Jibrillaram II; Koloram I; Koloram II
Marte	Njine	Njine Pri. Sch. I; Njine Pri. Sch. II; Maje Malumri; Maje Durturi; Aliye; C. B. D. A I; C. B. D. A II
Marte	Zaga	Ngalori Pri. Sch.; Zaga; Alinna Alhaji I; Alinna Alhaji II; Baranga I; Baranga II; Ngurmushi
Mobbar	Asaga	Asaga Pri. Sch. I; Asaga Pri Sch. II; Asaga Mahauta; Dagumaram; Guwa; Kainowa; Kanama
Mobbar	Bogum	Cattle Market; Giri Bulamari; Jumma Chere; Lawanti; Shere Bultuwa
Mobbar	Chamba	Chamba Pri. Sch.; Chamba T. Kauwa; Kennari; Kainowa; Makolori; Wololo
Mobbar	Damasak	Ajari; Damasak Lawanti; Damasak Pri. Sch.; Fulatari; Hausari; Joka Adamti; Kairi; Market Area I; Market Area II; Shettimari A; Shettimari B
Mobbar	Duji	Aminari; Custom Area; Duji Pri. Sch.; Fadana Garuwa; Kachalla Kelluri; Meleri
Mobbar	Gashagar	Gashagar Lawanti; Gashagar Market; Gashagar Pri. Sch. I; Gashagar Pri. Sch. II; Jugulu; Kurwa; Mallumti; Tamsuwa
Mobbar	Kareto	Alhajiri; Dagana Kanam; Goni Sulumti; Kareto Larti; Kareto Pri. Sch. I; Kareto Pri. Sch. II; Masho
Mobbar	Layi	Goni Abbari; Jinda; Ladanti I; Ladanti II; Layi Pri. Sch.
Mobbar	Zanna Umorti	Bulama B. Kyari; Goni Jindari; Kadauri I; Kadauri II; Kalusari; Malari; Yusufari; Zanna Umarti I; Zanna Umarti II
Mobbar	Zari	Aliri; Gabchiyari; Kachalla Kennari; Kairi; Kwailo; Zari Lawanti; Zari Pri. Sch.
Monguno	Damakuli	Damakuli I; Damakuli II; Gizza; Munye Kura
Monguno	Kaguram	Gumnari; Kaguram; Dasaia I; Dasaia II; Kursuma
Monguno	Kumalia	Magararam I; Magararam II; Chirchira; Zannari I; Zannari II
Monguno	Mofio	Mofio Lawanti; Mofio; Bida Market; Jele Kura; Zaian
Monguno	Mandala	Mandala I; Mandala II; Mallam Shishi; Ta'Ango
Monguno	Mintar	Diffinowa; Ngollom; Debele; Mintar; Magaram; Aliya; Moduari
Monguno	Monguno	Army Barracks I; Army Barracks II; Abbari I; Abbari II; Kumburi; Lawanti Shasha; Market Area; Bulama Gambo I; Bulama Gambo II; Viewing Centre; Health Clinic; Kuya Sheriff; Agric Area; Musaram; New Lawanti; Bulama Gapcha; Veterinary; Duwabafi; Mbatti; Charamari
Monguno	Ngurno	Kanumburi; Ngurno; Dam I; Dam II; Fanamari
Monguno	Sure	Sure Lawanti; Goso Goniri; Mittiri
Monguno	Wulo	Wulo; Kaza; Sheriff Musari; Kororom; Mowo; Janna Kudi; Dubula Kura
Monguno	Yele	Yele Lawanti; Yele; Sufa; Kalamnare
Monguno	Zulum	Bulonguwa; Yassala; Gusurye; Zuma
Ngala	Sagir	Lawanti I / Sagir Central Pri. School; Lawanti II / Sagir Central Pri. School; Bula-Ngafe / Bula-Ngafe Town; Waza'A Village / Waza'A Dispensary; Dan-Bore East / Dan-Bore Pri. School; Dan-Bore West / Dan-Bore Dispensary; Kirta I / Kirta Pri. Schoolkirta Wulgo; Goriya / Goriya Towngoriya Gudun; Sagir I / Agric Center; Sagir II / Sagir Market; Kirta II / Kirta Dispensary
Ngala	Fuye	Fuye; Bukda; Kinemuba; Dejiri; Gishiri; Girle; Gulwa; Musune; Kusuma; Darajimal; Bula Malumbe
Ngala	Gamboru 'B'	Badiya Bulin; Bulabulin; Kasuwan Katako; Malumburi I; Zawuya; Ghana I; Ghana II; Malumburi
Ngala	Gamboru 'C'	Badiya Din; Njemena Shuwari; Njemena Pri. Sch.; Pompom Kura; Bash; Bash Hayawango; Bash Fulatari; Shuwari; Prison; Barrack; Dispensary
Ngala	Logumane	Nguro I; Nguro II; Logomane I; Logomane II; Gumshe; Magare; Ajiwa
Ngala	Ndufu	Ndufu Pri. Sch.; Jokona; Saleri; Fairam; Dime; Meleri; Abbari; Amkula; Duksala; Muktu
Ngala	Ngala Ward	Shettimari; C. B. D. A. Quarters; Ngala Central Pri. Sch. I; Ngala Central Pri. Sch. II; Lowcost Ngala; Sunabako
Ngala	Old Gamboru 'A'	Gamboru Abuja; Fulatari; Yobe; Kanumburi; Zannari; Lawanti; Kanumburi Bulamari
Ngala	Tunokalia	Tunokalia Village; Shehuri Village; Manawaji Village; Bula Gonibe; Abbari Village; Manawaji Frekri; Ladari Village; Bula Laiye
Ngala	Warshele	Warshele Village; Antiliske Village; Koma Village; Hassanari; Ndufune I; Ndufune II; Mukdolo; Ngaiwa; Tongule; Kesawa; Tusuye
Ngala	Wulgo	Wulgo Town Viewing Centre I; Wulgo Dajiri I; Wulgo Dajiri II; Hausari; Zannari; Wulgo; Wulgo Central; Bula Kessabe; Garal Village; Jagarawaji; Yerwa Kura
Ngala	Wurge	Rogo; Tambajam; Wofio; Wurge
Nganzai	Alarge	Torowa Pri. Sch. I; Torowa Pri. Sch. II; Ganya'A; Durwari I; Durwari II
Nganzai	Badu	Badu Lawanti; Badu Pri. Sch.; Badu Market; Goni Yetchari I; Goni Yetchari II; Mallam Kyariri I; Mallam Kyariri II; Za'A Bore Hole I; Za'A Bore Hole II; Za'A Bore Hole III
Nganzai	Damaram	Damaram Pri. Sch. I; Damaram Pri. Sch. II; Sherifti I; Sherifti II; Abba Ganari I; Abba Ganari II
Nganzai	Gajiram	Gajiram Central Pri. Sch.; Gajiram Dispensary I; Gajiram Dispensary II; Gajiram Old Vet.; Women Dev. Centre; Gajiram Market I; Gajiram Market II; Gajiram Forestry; Kotte I; Kotte II; Lauwa Pri. Sch. I; Lauwa Pri. Sch. II
Nganzai	Gadai	Gadai Pri. Sch.; Gadai Bulamari; Gadai Dispensary; Manum Bore Hole; Gamayo Bulamari; Sudagu; A'Aram
Nganzai	Jigalta	Jigalta Lawanti I; Jigalta Lawanti II; Gasarwa Pri. Sch. I; Gasarwa Pri. Sch. II; Burimari
Nganzai	Kuda	Kuda Pri. Sch. I; Kuda Pri. Sch. II; Ali Buluri I; Ali Buluri II; Golumbeyari
Nganzai	Kurnawa	Kurnawa Pri. Sch.; Kurnawa Lawanti; Goyo Bulamari; Kurnawa Njemari
Nganzai	Miye	Miye Pri. Sch.; Miye Dispensary; Kessa Ngala I; Kessa Ngala II; Burari Bulamari; Malori I; Malori II; Wuska; Mairi Bulamari I; Mairi Bulamari II; Mairi Bulamari III
Nganzai	Sabsabuwa	Sabsabuwa Lawanti; Sabsabuwa Pri. Sch.; Dowo Bore Hole I; Dowo Bore Hole II
Nganzai	Sugundure	Sugundure Lawanti I; Sugundure Lawanti II; Mile Forty; Ma'Ara Water Point; Grema Matari I; Grema Matari II; Garsuno; Mulgu Bore Hole; Kaula Njimma I; Kaula Njimma II
Shani	Bargu / Burashika	Burashika Pri. Sch., Burashika I; Kofar Bulama M., Burashika II; Kofar Manga Garba, Tudun Wada; Bargu Pri. Sch., Bargu; Kofar Yaro, Bargu; Bargu Dispensary, Bargu; Bargu Sabon Fegi, Bargu I; Bargu Sabon Fegi, Bargu II; Kofar Lawan, Bargu; Mai Unguwa Dutse, Bargu; Kofar Bulama Dinga, Dinga; Kofar Mai Unguwa, Gunduri; Kofar Jauro T., Jauro Tukur
Shani	Buma	Buma Pri. Sch., Buma I; Kofar Lawan, Buma II; Kofar Bulama G., Killing; Kofar Bulama M., Guldurung; Kofar Bulama Ali, Sangwa
Shani	Gasi / Salifawa	Kofar B. Danladi, Gasi Kurngulung; Kofar B. Musa, Pahra I; Kofar B. Musa, Pahra II; Jauro Maina, Tashan Maina I; Jauro Maina, Tashan Maina II; Jauro Musa, Sarawuya; Mai Unguwa Misali, Sabon Sara I; Mai Unguwa Misali, Sabon Sara II; Jauro Siddi, Kulthi; Kubo Deno. Pri. Sch., Kubo Deno I; Kofar Lawan, Kubo Deno II; Jauro Gero, Lande Kato I; Jauro Gero, Lande Kato II; Bakin Tasha, Kurngulung I; Kofar Mai Unguwa, Kurngulung II; Jauro Geno, Funguru; Jauro Shindo, Peshingo; Kofar Bulama, Koburut; Kofar Lawan, Panshani
Shani	Gora	Gora Pri. Sch., Gora I; Gora Pri. Sch., Gora II; Gora Dispensary, Gora I; Gora Dispensary, Gora II; Kofar Lawan, Gora; Lapepel Pri. Sch., Lapepel; Jauro Usman, Lashana I; Jauro Usman, Lashana II; Mai Unguwa Wabi, Kaule; Kofar Bulama, Lawolom
Shani	Gwalasho	Kashim Pri. Sch., Kashim; Kofar Lawan, Peshingo; Wurobokki Pri. Sch., Wurobokki I; Kofar Bulama Ali, Wurobokki II; Kofar Jauro Yaro, Dalhat; Gari Pri. Sch., Gari I; Gari Pri. Sch., Gari II; Kofar Bulama, Tumbu
Shani	Gwaskara	Gwaskara Pri. Sch., Gwaskara I; Kofar Lawan, Gwaskara II; Lajada Pri. Sch., Lajada I; Lajada Pri. Sch., Lajada II; Kofar Bulama Adamu, Wajang; Kofar Bulama Yusufu, Gormodo
Shani	Kombo	Kombo Pri. Sch., Kombo I; Kombo Pri. Sch., Kombo II; Pilak Pri. Sch., Pilak; Kofar J. Shamya, Tudun Wada; Kareji Pri. Sch., Kareji I; Kareji Pri. Sch., Kareji II; Kofar Bulama, Kurkude
Shani	Kubo	Kubo Pri. Sch., Kubo Waja Malum I; Kubo Pri. Sch., Kubo Waja Malum II; Kubo Pri. Sch., Kubo; Kubo Dispensary, Kubo Dungu I; Kubo Dungu Pri. Sch., Kubo Dungu II; Kubo Dungu Pri. Sch., Kubo Dungu III; Gorawa Pri. Sch., Gorawa; Gindin Kuka, Unguwan Hausawa I; Kofar Bukar, Unguwan Hausawa II; Kofar Abubakar, Jeki I; Jauro Yahaya, Jeki II; Jauro Yahaya, Dubukku; Dandang Pri. Sch. Danbang; Kofar Ardo B Dandang II
Shani	Kwaba	Lakundum Pri. Sch., Lakundum I; Kofar Bulama Musa, Lakundum II; Jauro Magaji, Didango I; Jauro Magaji, Didango II; Kofar B. Adamu, Jigawa; Kofar B. Isa, Labilis
Shani	Shani	Viewing Centre, Viewing Centre I; Viewing Centre, Viewing Centre II; Bigari Pri. Sch., Bigaru I; Kofar Mai Unguwa, Bigaru II; Vet. Office, Veterinary I; Mai-Unguwa, Veterinary II; Kofar Maiunguwa Musa, Unguwa Hausawa I; Kofar Maiunguwa, Anguwan Hausawa II; Admin Block, Gss Shani; Ngabu Pri. Sch., Ngabu I; Ngabu Pri. Sch., Ngabu II; Lawolon Pri. Sch., Lawolom; Kofar Bulama, Pitila; Wurojam Pri. Sch., Wurojam; Kurje Pri. Sch., Kurje I; Kofar Lawan, Kurje II; Bakaina Pri. Sch., Bakaina I; Kofar B. Ibrahim, Bakaina II; Kofar Bulama, Lamor
Shani	Walama	Walama Pri. Sch., Walama I; Walama Pri. Sch., Walama II; Kofar Lawan, Walama III; Kimtir Pri. Sch., Kimtir; Kofar J. Buba, Nahuta; Kofar B. Musa, Kwahra; Kofar J. Yahaya, Mijekti; Kofar A. Dauda, Pela I; Kofar Lawan, Pela II; Pajala Pri. Sch., Pajala; Kofar B. Musa, Yelwa Dthida; Kofar Bulama, Burkulok
