= Bornu Yassa =

- Location in Nigeria
- Coordinates: 12°16′N 12°33′E
- Country: Nigeria
- State: Borno State

Population (2007)
  - Total: 5,987
- Time zone: UTC+1 (West Africa Time)

Bornu Yassa is a town in Borno State, north-east Nigeria near Titiwa, some 80 kilometres south of the border with Niger. As of 2007, it had an estimated population of 5,987.
