= Wamdeo =

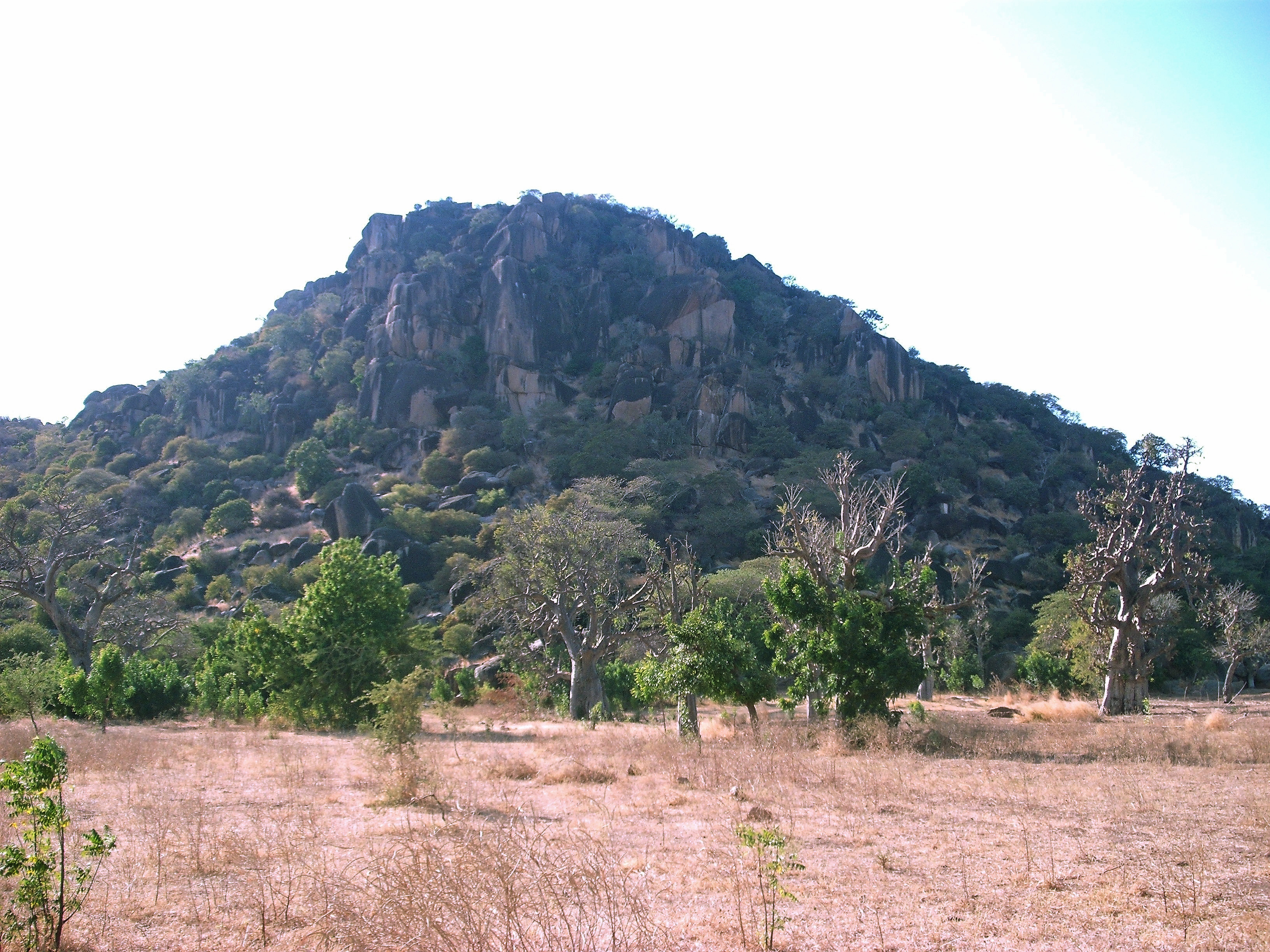
A front view of Wamdeo Hill

Wamdeo is a town in Askira/Uba local government area of Borno State, Nigeria. It shares borders with Uba to the East, Uvu to the South, Mussa to the North, Mishara to the North-East and Rumirgo to the West. The town's name was originally pronounced "Wandi" but later metamorphosed to "Wamdeo" due to the way the nomadic Fulani pronounce it. It is populated wholly by two clans: the Muva (further split into the Njila-Njila, Bilata, Dagufla and the Patha) and the Zugubi (further split into Kidimbla, Mbla Kauchacha, Gutha and the Fidigutum)

== History ==
Wamdeo was derived from the word “Wandi” and has existed for more than 500 years. Many theories exist for claims regarding the first occupants of the region but the Dagu-Flas and the Zugubis claim to be the first occupants of the area. Other major clans include Midala also known as mai wa kra tha (derived from the head of a cow given to them in ancient history), the Lere believed to have migrated from Northern Cameroon and Eastern Chad, the Holma also known as Bla-ta (derived from the Marghi word ‘mai ma ki bla ta nga’ meaning take shelter under that ganji tree) believed to be refugees in search of shelter from Kilba area, the Fidigutum believed to have migrated from Fali land (Fidi is derived from Fidi mountain in Vimtim) and lastly the Pazza originating from Biu area to mountain Pazza now Bazza. As a result of missionary work in the region headed by Stover Kulp, Christianity was introduced to Wamdeo in 1937 during the reign of Shal-Tagu from the Dag-Fla clan. In 1938, the first dispensary in Wamdeo was built by the missionaries and in 1945, the first CRI was established in Wamdeo during the reign of Lawan Mumini from the Zugubi clan.

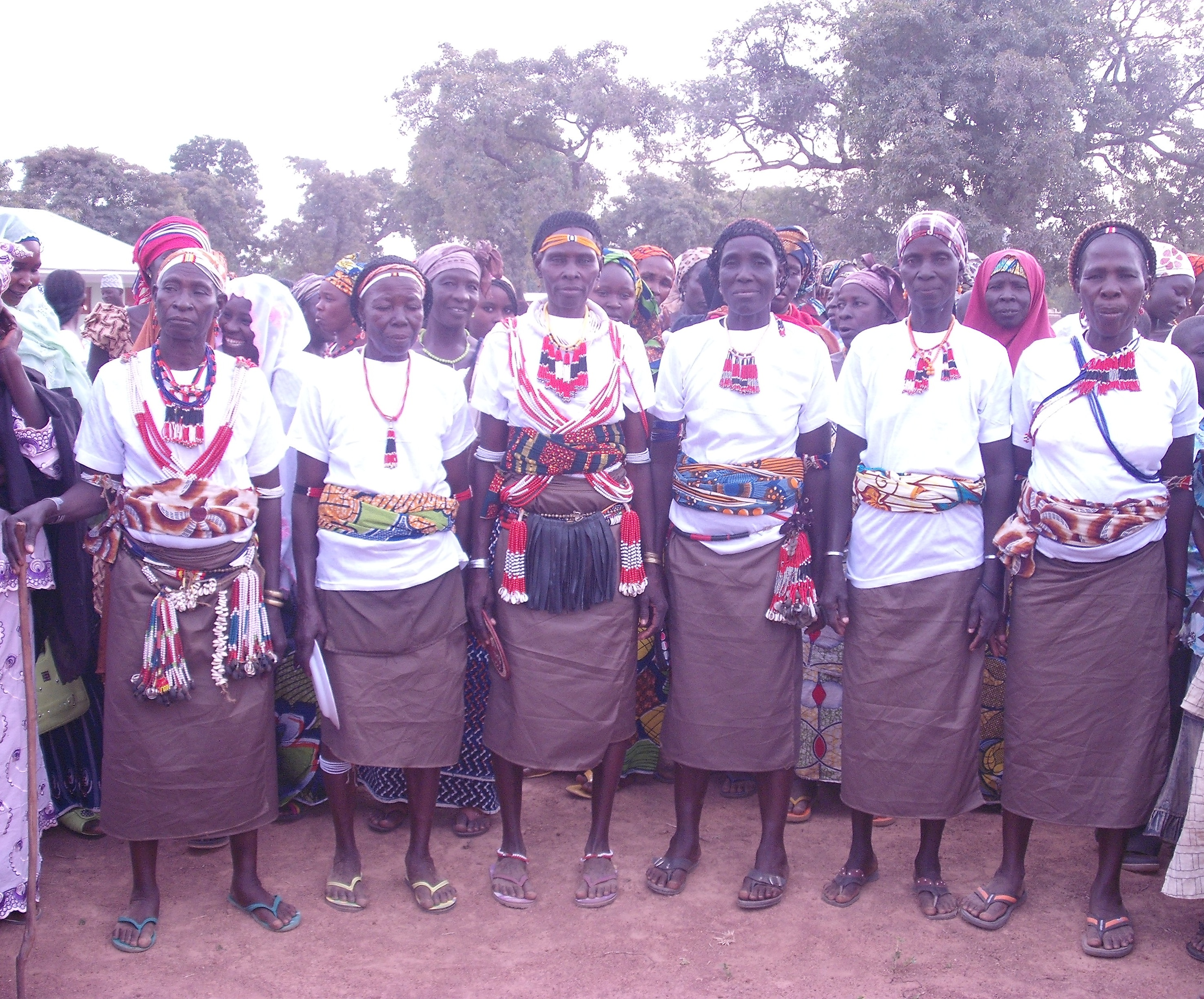
A cross-section of Wamdeo dancers

== Leadership ==
Prior to the fission of Gongola into Adamawa and Taraba State, the government and dynasty of Wamdeo was answerable to the Lamido in Yola, but after the creation of Adamawa state, Wamdeo became a district in Askira/Uba Local Government of Borno State. Wamdeo is traditionally governed by a Hakkimi in the person of Alh. Saidu Mohammed with four Lawans: Lawan Zubairu Wadzani, Lawan Buba Glaji, and two others from Kwa-bula and Wallafa.

== Geography ==
Wamdeo lies between 10^{o} 31’ 33’’N, 13^{o}07’30’’E. Wamdeo lies at an elevation of about 555 metres or 1,821 feet above mean sea level, at the foot of a large Inselberg known as Wamdeo hill which rise up to 758 metres or 2,487 feet above mean sea level. Wamdeo has the largest land mass in the whole of Askira/Uba local government area comprising several villages including Kwa-bula, Mungum, Wallafa, Gajelli, and Miya.

== Drainage ==
Wamdeo town is on the watershed between the catchments of the Yedzaram River to the North and East (Chad Basin) and of the Hawul River to the Southeast, Southwest and Northwest (Gongola Basin)

== Vegetation ==
The vegetation in Wamdeo consists of large isolated Acacia trees and shrubs savannah which tends to thicken along the drainage line and at the foot of the hills. The drainage lines of Mbulashibu and Kofiwa tends to have thicker vegetation, so also the foot of Fum Hill. Wamdeo land is intensively cropped around the town, where human activities have markedly altered the vegetation and surface soil.

== Geology ==
Wamdeo like most of the regions in Southern Borno is located on a Basement Complex and is defined tectonically by fault bounded basins containing sediments which vary in age from cretaceous to quaternary. The Chad basin lies to the North and the Benue Trough to the south. To the west is a shallow basin known as the Zambuk ridge which links the two main Basins. Wamdeo is located in the North Central part of the Borno Basement Region. Some 45 kilometres or 28 miles to the North, the basement disappear beneath the sediments of the Chad basin. The Principal basement fractures around Wamdeo trend Northwards and North-Eastward

== Stratigraphy ==
The bedrock of Wamdeo town is formed by basement granite. The Stratigraphy unit is overlain by widespread eluvium deposit and minor deposit of alluvium.

== Basement Complex ==
Most of the basement complex of the area is dominated by biotitic granite which is light gray, very coarse grained and occasionally pegmatitic and aplitic. Porphoric feldspar is occasionally present and sometimes shows a general parallel alignment. The main outcrop in the area is the Wamdeo Hill. Others include Yawa, Mizra, Para, Auta, Fum, etc. Most of the eastern part of the town is devoid of basement rock outcrops.
