= Bagauda dynasty =

The Bagauda dynasty, also known as the Bagaudawa, is a house of noblemen who founded and ruled the kingdom (eventually sultanate) of Kano throughout its existence. The dynasty spanned over 800 years spread out through ten centuries, one of the longest in recorded human history and produced 43 rulers. After the fall of the dynasty in Kano, the remnants of the royal house founded a new kingdom in the Maradi Region.

== History ==
"A man shall come to this land with an army, and gain mastery over us, you will see him in the sacred place of Tsumburbura, if he comes not in your time, assuredly he will come in the time of your children, and will conquer all in this country, and forget you and yours and exalt himself and his people for years to come"

The dynasty started with the first king of Kano, Bagauda, in 999 CE and lasted until 1807 CE, when the last ruler from the lineage, Muhammad Alwali II, was assassinated in exile during the Fulani War. Their reign started after Bagauda migrated to Kano and conquered the indigenous pagans of Dala Hill, although the rest of Kano would not fall under their control until during the reign of his early successors.

The dynasty is divided into three factions or eras, the Gaudawa, the Rumfawa and the Kutumbawa, but their lineage can all be traced to Bagauda according to the Kano Chronicle. They are said to have descended from Bawo, the son of Hausa folk hero Bayajidda and his wife, the last Kabara, Magajiya Daurama.The arrival of Bagauda is said to have fulfilled the prophecy of Barbushe.

=== Gaudawa ===
The Gaudawa's reign was characterized by the conquest and consolidation of what is now known as Kano State by Bagauda and his earliest descendants. Their era was characterized by mostly war and expansion by the rulers and also the construction of the Kano Walls. They also laid the foundation of the Kano administrative system and revolutionized its military along with imposing Islam as the state religion. The Gaudawa are also known as "Daurawa".

=== Rumfawa ===
The Rumfawa oversaw the zenith of the Kano sultanate. With the opening of trade routes a few decades earlier in the time of Abdullahi Burja, Muhammad Rumfa and his descendants were able to propel the state to the peak of its commercial and political influence. This saw a wave of immigrants from other parts the Sahel as well as the venture of Kano's citizens into other parts of the region, asserting the state as a major trading center. Their reign culminated in the complete subordination of all of Hausaland by Kano during the reign of Rumfa's grandson, Muhammad Kisoki. The Rumfawa made the most important administrative and social reforms in Kano.

=== Kutumbawa ===
The Kutumbawa era began in 1623, starting with Muhammad Alwali I, famously known as El Kutumbi. This era saw dwindling fortunes for the Sultanate. The Kutumbawa faced various waves of famine (possibly due to environmental degradation), indecisive wars by increasingly aggressive neighbors, and had to deal with internal strife within the Kano royal house. Ravaged by economic and political crises, the Kutumbawa saw the fall of Kano's founding dynasty.

== Genealogy ==
Bagauda dynasty

Kings of Kano (Sarkin Kano)
Bauwo	Kaunasu
1 Daud; Bagoda; 999–1063	Saju
2 Warisi; 1063-1095	Yānas
Munsada	3 Gijimasu; 1095-1134	Yankuma or Yankuna
4 Nawata; 1134-1136 (co-ruler 1134)	4 Gawata co-ruler 1134	5 Yusa; Tsaraki; 1136-1194	Muntáras or Yankuma
Gijimasu	Munsada	6 Naguji; 1194-1247
7 Gugua; 1247-1290	Tsaraki	Auta
Salmata	8 Shekkarau I 1290–1307	Kumyerku
Maganarku	9 Tsamia; Barandamasu; 1307-1343	10; Osumanu; Zamnagawa; 1343-1349
Sultans of Kano
11; Yaji; Ali; 1349-1385	Aunaka	12; Bugaya; Mohammad; 1349-1385
Yatara	13; Kanajeji; 1347-1390	Tekidda
Auta
14; Umaru; 1410-1421	15; Dauda; 1421-1438	16; Abdulahi; Burja; 1438-1452	Tasafi
17; Dakauta; 1452 (1 day) (deposed)	19; Yakubu; 1452-1463	Fasima; Berana
18; Atuma; 1452 (deposed)	20; Mohamma; Rimfa; 1463-1499	Auwa
21; Abdulahi; 1499-1509	Lamis	25; Abubakr; Kado; 1565-1573 (deposed)
Tunus	22; Mohamma; Kisoki; 1509-1565	Hausatu
Zuhara	23; Yakufu; 1565	Fasuma	27; Mohamma; Zaki; 1582-1618	Kursu
24; Dauda; Abasama I 1565 (exiled)	26; Mohamma; Shashere; 1573-1582 (deposed)	Dada	28; Mohamma; Nazaki; 1618-1623
Fudima	29; Kutumbi; 1623-1648
Fari	30; Al Haji; 1648-1649 (deposed)	Goro
31; Shekkarau II; 1649-1651	Fasuma	32,34; Mohamma; Kukuna; 1651-1652; 1652-1660 (deposed twice)	Lamis
33; Soyaki; 1652 (deposed)	Ka Iya Gari	35; Bawa; 1660-1670
Mariamma	36; Dadi; 1670-1703
37; Mohamma; Sharefa; 1703-1731	Duki	Yerduna	40; Mohamma; Yaji; 1753-1768	Baiwa
Zama; Zenabu	38; Mohamma; Kumbari; 1731-1743	41; Babba; Zaki; 1768-1776	42; Dauda; Abasama II; 1776-1781	43; Mohamma; Alwali; 1781-1807
39; Alhaji; Kabe; 1743-1753

== See also ==
- List of rulers of Kano
