= Alhaji Kabe =

- Sarkin Kano
- Reign: 1743 - 1753
- Predecessor: Kumbari
- Successor: Yaji II
- Born: Kabe
- House: Bagauda (Kutumbawa)
- Father: Kumbari Dan Sharefa
- Mother: Zenabu
- Religion: Syncretic Islam

Kabe Dan Kumbari, known as Alhaji Kabe , was the thirty-ninth ruler of the Sultanate of Kano, reigning for the ten-year period between 1743 and 1753. He was primarily remembered by the Kano Chronicle as a malevolent and ruthless King. It is said that no record can be kept of the number of battles and wars he fought or those fought by the subkingdoms of Kano by his orders, most notably against Gobir. The baleful nature of his reign led to the ousting of the already unpopular bloodline of Muhammad Sharefa.

== Ascension ==
He was the son of Kumbari and Zenabu, who was also known as "Zama". He is also a descendant of the Gaya Noble House, through is paternal grandmother, Maidaki Mariamma. He succeeded his father as Sultan in 1743.

== Reign ==
"He was a Sarki of many wars and terrible. From the time he obtained the kingdom he did not remain five months in his house. without going to war or sending out his Sarkis to fight."

The Chronicle noted that there was no man of Kabe's age who killed as mercilessly as he did. However, despite his bellicose nature, he was said to have been very generous towards religious scholars because he feared for his soul in the afterlife.

== War with Gobir ==
"Sarkin Gobir sent to try and make peace with him but Kabe refused. He sent to Sarkin Gobir Barbari, saying, 'I have a cap to fit anyone's head'."

An inconclusive war erupted between Gobir under Sarkin Gobir Soba and Kano under Kabe's father, Kumbari. Gobir's aggression towards Kano was believed to be under the orders of the Mai Ali of Bornu. The Sultan of Gobir during Kabe's time, Baribari (another name for Kanuri), sought to make peace with Kano but was ardently rebuffed. He soon made for Kano and their armies clashed at Dami. It is said that the men of Kano, bar the Royal Guard (Dogarai) and a faction known as the "Kwinkele" deserted Alhaji Kabe fearing the "magic", the men of Gobir possessed. Among the high ranking Kano officials, only the Sarkin Dawaki and Turakin Kuka (Chief of Eunuchs) remained. The army of Gobir charged towards him and he barely escaped with his life. This show of disunity was evidence of dissent within the Kano Nobility and the unpopularity of Alhaji Kabe. Kano and Gobir continued to engage in frequent battles until Kabe's death.

== Death and succession ==
Alhaji Kabe died in 1753 but not before causing much havoc in the Sultanate. The Kingmakers elected his grandfathers brother and bitter rival, Yaji, who had a more peaceful disposition as Sultan. Yaji was known as "Mallam Mai Lafia" because of his meek nature.

== Biography in the Kano Chronicle ==
Below is a full biography of Alhaji Kabe from Palmer's 1908 English translation of the Kano Chronicle.

The 39th Sarki was Alhaji Kabe. His mother's name was Zama. She was also called Zenabu.

He was a Sarki of many wars and terrible. From the time he obtained the kingdom he did not remain 5 months in his house without going to war or sending out his Sarkis to fight.

Sarkin Gobir sent to try and make peace with him but Kabe refused. He sent to Sarkin Gobir Barbari, saying, "I have a cap to fit anyone's head."

Barbari said, "I hear."

The next year Barbari came to Kano to war. A battle ensued between him and Kabe at Dami. The Kanawa ran away, because of the "magic" which Barbari possessed. The Kanawa left Kabe alone with the Dogarai and Kwinkele, and Sarkin Dawaki Kinku Ammi and Turaki Kuka Yadoka. The whole army of the Gobirawa came charging up to the Sarkin Kano. The Kwinkele withstood them until their chief was killed.

Then Yakidoka said, "Sarkin Kano, all the men of Kano have run away and left you alone with your slaves."

Sarkin Kano returned to the town together with his slaves (some say with the Kanawa) sick at heart. The Gobirawa went on slaughtering the Kanawa, and the Kanawa slaughtered the Gobirawa in frequent wars until Kabe’s death. No record can be kept of the fighting between them in Kabe’s time or the number of wars in which Kabe engaged or which he ordered. No one gave presents to the mallams so much as Kabe did, for he sought a reward in the next world. There was no man of his age who was so ruthless in killing men as Kabe. There was no peace in Kano, only trouble after trouble what with the war with Gobir and other wars.

Sarikin Dawaki Ali, Jarumai Tugwai Dan Bajidda, Sarkin Jarumai Salihu, Lifidi Abubakr, Berdi Bakana, Makama Bagwinki, Lifidi Sawani, Ganda Faria, Magajin Kan-Kama, Doro, Lifidi Jedi Kwoma, Makama Almajir, Galadima Guraguri, Galadima Jarmawa Ali, Berde-Kunda, Burde Bakudu, Sarkin Damargu Buzu Dan Barji, Sarkin Ringim Kwirudu, Burdi Shahu, and others, were Kumbari’s warriors, and fought for Kabe.

Kabe ruled 9 years and 7 months.

— Kano Chronicle

Preceded by Kumbari	Sarkin Kano; 1743-1753	Succeeded by Yaji II
