= Ancient Kano City Walls =

National monument of Nigeria in Kano

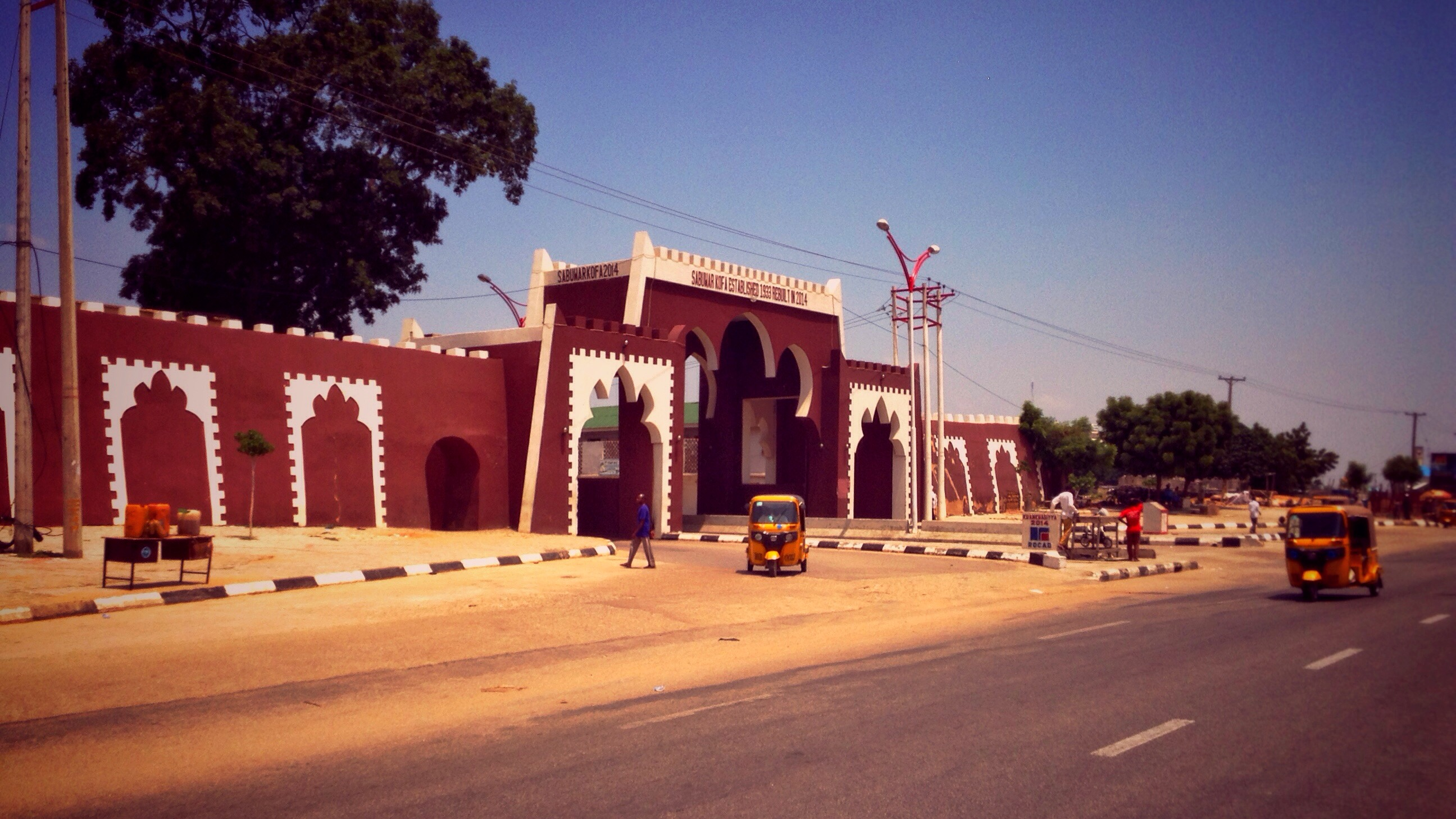
- Sabuwar Kofa, one of the city gates

- Location within Nigeria
- 11.9555°N 8.49754°E
- Type: Defensive wall
- Location: Kano Kano State; Nigeria

History
- Built: 1095–1134
- Built for: Defence

Site notes
- Height: 15 metres (50 ft)
- Governing body: Kano State Tourism

The Ancient Kano City Walls (Hausa: Ganuwa) were ancient defensive walls built to protect the inhabitants of the ancient city of Kano. The wall was initially built from 1095 through 1134 and completed in the middle of the 14th century. The Ancient Kano City Walls were described as "the most impressive monument in West Africa".

== History ==
The Ancient Kano City Walls were built as a defensive wall with the construction of the foundation laid by Sarki Gijimasu (r. 1095–1134), the third king of the Kingdom of Kano in the Kano Chronicle. In the mid 14th century during the reign of Zamnagawa, the wall was completed before it was further expanded during the 16th century. According to historians, the then General-Governor of the Colony and Protectorate of Nigeria, Fredrick Lugard, wrote in a 1903 report about the Kano Walls that he had “never seen anything like it in Africa” after capturing the ancient city of Kano along with British forces.

== Structure ==
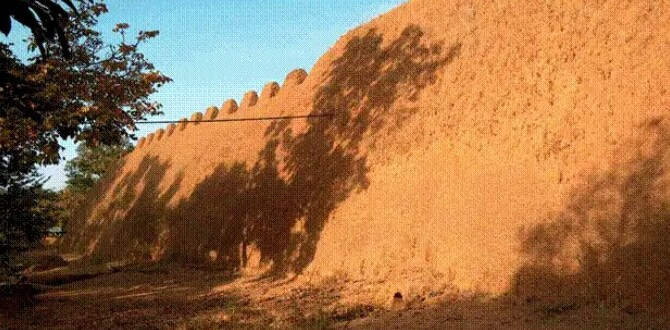
View of the wall.

The Ancient Kano City Walls are made up of Dala Hill where it was founded, Kurmi Market and the Emir's Palace.

The Ancient Kano City Walls originally had an estimated height of 9.1 to 15.2 m (30 to 50 ft) and about 12 m (40 ft) thick at the base with 15 gates around it.

== See also ==
- List of walls
- Gates of Hausa kingdoms
