= Muhammad Kukuna =

- Sarkin Kano
- Reign: 1651–1652, 1652–1660
- Predecessor: Shekkarau II
- Successor: Bawa
- House: Bagauda Dynasty
- Father: Alhaji
- Mother: Goro

Muhammad Kukuna was a Sultan of Kano who reigned from 1651 to 1652, and again from 1652 to 1660. His reign was interrupted in 1652 by Soyaki.

== Biography in the Kano Chronicle ==
Below is a biography of Muhammad Kukuna from Palmer's 1908 English translation of the Kano Chronicle.

The 32nd Sarki was Mohamma Kukuna. His mother’s name was Goro. After he became Sarki he ruled one year. The Madawaki Kuma turned him out, and gave the power to his sister Fasuma’s son Soyaki.

Mohamma Kukuna then entered the Gidan Rumfa and lived 60 days there. After this he arrested the Madawakin Kano. Then he assembled many maidens, put the Madawaki on a donkey, and handed it over to the maidens to drive round the town. They did as he commanded. The Madawaki died of chagrin.

Kukuna drove away Fasuma, the wife of Shekkarau and mother of Soyaki, because of the grudge he bore her son. She built a house at Durumin Yer Madawaki.

Next year Sarkin Kworarafa Adashu came to attack Kano. Sarki Kano went to Yan Magada, where he stayed 7 days, and then to Auyo and Abewa, where he remained 40 days. On his return to Kano he found that the Kworarafa had battered down the Kofan Kawayi. He waited 7 days, then marched round the city on a Saturday, entered his house, and stayed there 2 days. On a Monday he went to the Kofan Kawayi and built it up. From the first of these episodes he was called “Gewayer Garu,” from the second “Na chin Kassa.” On the same Monday he called all the Marguzawa to the city to salute him. They remained 21 days, and played a game in which they beat each other’s heads with iron. The Sarki gave them many gifts, and asked them who was their chief.

On their saying it was Zanku, the Sarki said to him, “Next year come again, and let all your men come with their ‘hauyias’ on their shoulders.”

“If you do so, Zanku,” said Kukana, “God willing, no Sarkin Kano will be driven out again.”

Afterwards he sent for the Liman Yandoiya, and after giving him many presents said, “I want you to give me a charm which will prevent any Sarki from being again driven out of Kano.”

The Liman said, “Very well, but you must increase your presents.”

Kukuna did so, and gave him silver and gold. The Liman gave him what he gave him. The Liman told Kukuna to bury one charm in the Turaki Mainya’s house, another in the house of Turakin Kuka, and another in the “Treasury” of Kano; and he further added that a fire must be kept burning every day above the charms, and assured the Sarki that if his instructions were carried out no Sarki would ever be again deposed.

Kukuna did so, and ruled 8 years and 7 months in addition to the year that is mentioned above. Then he was deposed.

— Kano Chronicle

Preceded by Shekkarau II	Sarkin Kano; 1651-1660	Succeeded by Bawa
