= Muhammad Nazaki =

- Sarkin Kano
- Reign: 1618-1623
- Predecessor: Muhammad Zaki
- Successor: Kutumbi
- House: Bagauda Dynasty
- Father: Muhammad Zaki
- Mother: Kursu

Muhammad Nazaki was a Sultan of Kano who reigned from 1618 to 1623.

== Biography in the Kano Chronicle ==
Below is a biography of Muhammad Nazaki from Palmer's 1908 English translation of the Kano Chronicle.

The 28th Sarki was Mohamma Nazaki. His mother’s name was Kursu.

When he became Sarki he sent messengers to make peace with Katsina. Sarkin Katsina refused his terms and invaded Kano. The Kanawa came out, and a battle took place at Karayi, in which the Kanawa defeated the Katsinawa. They then returned to Kano. Next year the Sarkin Kano went to Kalam. He left the Wombai Giwa behind at Kano because he was sick. When the Wombai recovered he said, “What can I do to please the Sarki?”

His men said, “Add to the city.”

He said, “Very well.”

So he built a wall from the Kofan Dogo to the Kofan Gadonḳaia, and from the Kofan Dakawuyia to the Kofan Kabuga, and to the Kofan Kansakali. He spent an enormous amount of money on this improvement. Every morning he brought 1,000 calabashes of food and 50 oxen for the workmen till the work was finished. Every man in Kano went to work. No man surpassed the Wombai in benevolence to Moslems and the poor.

The day when the work was to be finished the Wombai Giwa distributed among the workmen 1,000 “tobes.” He slaughtered 300 cows at the Kofan Kansakali and gave the mallams many presents. When the Sarkin Kano returned from war, the Wombai gave him 100 riding horses. Each horse had a mail coat. The Sarki was very pleased. He said, “What shall I do for this man, to make his heart glad?”

His men said, “Give him a town.” So the Sarki gave him Karayi. Hence the song:

“Elephant Lord of the town,
Abdullah foe of the bull hippopotamus,
whose chains for taking captive women
are hoes and axes.”

The Wombai left Kano and went to Karayi. Every day he fought the Katsinawa and took much spoil from them in war. He became master of a hundred mailed horsemen and a thousand horses. He was sung as “The elephant who reduces his neighbours to servitude.” He became so mighty that it was feared he would revolt. Hence he was turned out of his office in the time of Kutumbi.

Mohamma Nazaki ruled Kano 5 years and 1 month.

— Kano Chronicle

Preceded by Muhammad Zaki	Sarkin Kano; 1618-1623	Succeeded by Kutumbi
