= Alhaji (sultan) =

- Sarkin Kano
- Reign: 1648-1649
- Predecessor: Kutumbi
- Successor: Shekkarau II
- House: Bagauda Dynasty
- Father: Kutumbi
- Mother: Fadima

Alhaji (or Alhaji dan Kutumbi) was a Sultan of Kano who reigned from 1648 to 1649.

== Biography in the Kano Chronicle ==
Below is a biography of Alhaji from Palmer's 1908 English translation of the Kano Chronicle.

The 30th Sarki was Alhaji Dan Kutumbi. His mother’s name was Fadima.

He ruled Kano 8 months and 24 days, then he was deposed—the reason, I do not remember. He went into the country to live at a place called Dan Zaki.

— Kano Chronicle

Preceded by Kutumbi	Sarkin Kano; 1648-1649	Succeeded by Shekkarau II
