= Soyaki =

- Sarkin Kano
- Reign: 1652
- Predecessor: Muhammad Kukuna
- Successor: Muhammad Kukuna
- House: Bagauda Dynasty
- Father: Shekkarau II
- Mother: Fatsuma

Soyaki was a Sultan of Kano who reigned in 1652.

== Biography in the Kano Chronicle ==
Below is a biography of Soyaki from Palmer's 1908 English translation of the Kano Chronicle.

Soyaki was the 34th Sarki. His mother was Fatsuma.

Kukuna fled to Zukzuk. Soyaki had been reigning three months when the chiefs of Kano met together and held a consultation about him. The chief of them were the Galadima Wari, the grandfather of Kofakani Dan Iya Babba, Makama Mukhtari and Sarkin Dawaki Gogori. They sent messengers secretly to Mohamma Kukuna, who at once set out for Gaiya. The Sarkin Gaiya joined him in his march to Kano. The Madawakin Kano heard of this, assembled the men of Kano, and told them the news. They said, “We hear.”

He said, “What do you propose?”

They said, “Shall we not go out before they get close to the city.”

The Madawaki said, “Very well.”

A battle took place at Hotoro. The Kano men ran away and deserted the Madawaki Kuma. Kukuna attacked him with a spear. He feared to be killed, and tried to escape. Kukuna followed him. The Madawaki made for the Kofan Kawayi and shouted to the people to close the gate behind him, so that Mohamma Kukuna should not enter. Kukuna, however, got in before the gate was shut and reached the palace. He found the Sarki Soyaki at the Giddan Ma-Shikashikai, together with his eunuchs.

So he seized the sword from the hand of Soyaki and cried, “Allahu, Akbar, You, Sarki of a day! Go out! If you do not go I will cut your head off.” The Sarki went out. A house was built for him at Dukarawa, where he lived and died.

— Kano Chronicle

| Preceded by Muhammad Kukuna | Sarkin Kano; 1652 | Succeeded by Muhammad Kukuna |
