= Dauda (sultan) =

- Sarkin Kano
- Reign: 1421-1438
- Predecessor: Umaru
- Successor: Abdullahi Burja
- House: Bagauda Dynasty
- Father: Kanajeji
- Mother: Auta

Dauda was a Sultan of Kano who reigned from 1421 to 1438.

== Biography in the Kano Chronicle ==
Below is a biography of Dauda from Palmer's 1908 English translation of the Kano Chronicle.

The 15th Sarki was Dauda Bakon Damisa. His mother was Auta.

In his time Dagachi, a great prince, came from South Bornu with many men and mallams. He brought with him horse-drums and trumpets and flags and guns. When he came he sat down at Bomfai. The Sarkin Kano went to see him.

When he saw that he was indeed a great prince, he returned home and took counsel with his men and said, “Where is this man to stay?”

The Galadima Babba said, “If you let him settle elsewhere than in Kano town, he will soon be master of that part of the country.”

The Sarki said, “Where can he stay here with his army—Kano is full of men—unless we increase the size of our town?”

The Galadima was sent to see Dagachi and returned with him, and built a house for him and his men at Dorai. The Sarki said to his men, “What shall I give him to please him, and to make his heart glad?”

The Galadima Babba said, “Give him whatever you wish, you are Sarki, you own everything.”

The Sarki said nothing. At that time he was about to start for war with Zaria, so he said to Dagachi, “When I go to war I will put all the affairs of Kano into your hands, city and country alike.”

So the Sarkin Kano went to war and left Dagachi in the town. Dagachi ruled the town for 5 months and became very wealthy.

Then the Sarki returned. At this time Zaria, under Queen Amina, conquered all the towns as far as Kworarafa and Nupe. Every town paid tribute to her. The Sarkin Nupe sent 40 eunuchs and 10,000 kolas to her. She first had eunuchs and kolas in Hausaland. In her time the whole of the products of the west were brought to Hausaland. Her conquests extended over 34 years.

I will leave now the story of Amina and return to Sarkin Kano.

Dauda Bakon Damisa ruled Kano 17 years.

— Kano Chronicle

Preceded by Umaru	Sarkin Kano; 1421-1438	Succeeded by Abdullahi Burja
