= Naguji =

- Sarkin Kano
- Reign: 1194-1247
- Predecessor: Yusa
- Successor: Gugua
- House: Bagauda Dynasty
- Father: Yusa
- Mother: Yankuma or Muntaras

Naguji was the King of Kano from 1194 to 1247. He was the son of Yusa and Yankuma (or Muntaras).

== Succession ==
Gijimasu was succeeded by Gugua (Gujjua), a son of Gijimasu.

== Biography in the Kano Chronicle ==
Below is a biography of Naguji from Palmer's 1908 English translation of the Kano Chronicle.

The 6th Sarki was Naguji. His mother’s name was Yankuma or Muntáras. He was generous, but a man of violent passions. From Kura to Tsangaya he ravaged the country, and forced the people, willing or unwilling, to follow him.

He camped at Basema 2 years for the purpose of attacking Santolo, but he was worsted in the war and returned to Kano. He found the pagans there on the verge of revolt; so he cajoled them with talk, and executed their leader, Samagi, the son of Mazadau, Dorini son of Bugazau, Burtsar Gānguta son of Tsoron Maje, and Buzuzu son of Jandodo. When they were dead the rest of the people said, “We are willing to follow you, O Sarki, because we must.”

The Sarki said to them, “If you are willing to follow me show me the secrets of this god of yours.”

But they replied, “We will not show you the secrets of our god.” So the Sarki punished them.

Naguji was the first Sarki who collected a land tax of one-eighth of the crop from all husbandmen. He ruled all the land of Kano save Santolo which stood out against him.

He ruled 55 years.

— Kano Chronicle

Preceded by Yusa	Sarkin Kano; 1194-1247	Succeeded by Gugua
