= Muhammad Zaki =

- Sarkin Kano
- Reign: 1582-1618
- Predecessor: Muhammad Shashere
- Successor: Muhammad Nazaki
- House: Bagauda Dynasty
- Father: Muhammad Kisoki
- Mother: Hausatu

Muhammad Zaki was a Sultan of Kano who reigned from 1582 to 1618.

== Biography in the Kano Chronicle ==
Below is a biography of Muhammad Muhammad Zaki from Palmer's 1908 English translation of the Kano Chronicle.

The 27th Sarki was Mohamma Zaki, son of Kisoki. The name of his mother was Hausatu, the daughter of Tamma. When Mohamma became Sarki, Tamma came to live at Kano together with his men, the Kartukawa. In the time of Mohamma Zaki “Tchukana” and “Dirki” were begun.

The Sarki's men kept saying to him, “Sarkin Kano, if you leave the Katsinawa alone, they will become masters of all Kano and you will have nothing to rule but a little.”

The Sarki said, “I will conquer the Katsinawa if Allah wills.”

At this time the Sarkin Kworarafa came to attack Kano. The people of Kano left the city and went to Daura, with the result that the Kworarafawa ate up the whole country and Kano became very weak. The men of Katsina kept on harrying Kano. If it had not been for the sake of the mallams in Kano, they would have entered and destroyed the city.

There was a great famine which lasted 11 years. The Sarki called all his men and mallams together and said, “I have called you together to take counsel with me, How are we to stay this calamity?”

Shehu Abubakr the Maghrebine said: “If you wish to repel the men of Katsina, I will give you something to do it with, but if you do repel them, you will never return to Kano.”

The Sarki said, “I agree.”

He gave Shehu great wealth and the mallams many gifts. Shehu did as he promised to do. The Sarki left Kano on the 22nd day of Ramadan, and arrived beneath the walls of Katsina at daybreak on the day of the Salla. The men of Katsina came out to battle before the hour of the feast. The battle took place at Guraji. The men of Kano defeated the men of Katsina. The men of Katsina dispersed and fled, and the Kanawa took much spoil. They took 400 horses, and 60 suits of horse armour. No one knows the amount of the spoil or the number of the slain.

The Sarki returned to Karayi, where he died. His captains in war were eight in number: Madawaki Shaduka, Makama Babba, Jarumai Kaiotau, Atuman, Yanka Shaida, Burdi Hako, Dawaki Marku and Butali.

He ruled Kano 37 years and 5 months.

— Kano Chronicle

Preceded by Muhammad Shashere	Sarkin Kano; 1582-1618	Succeeded by Muhammad Nazaki
