= Kumbari =

- Sarkin Kano
- Reign: 1731-1743
- Predecessor: Muhammad Sharefa
- Successor: Alhaji Kabe
- House: Bagauda Dynasty
- Father: Muhammad Sharefa
- Mother: Duki

Kumbari was a Sultan of Kano who reigned from 1731 to 1743.

== Biography in the Kano Chronicle ==
Below is a biography of Kumbari from Palmer's 1908 English translation of the Kano Chronicle.

The 38th Sarki was Mohamma Kumbari, the son of Sharefa and Duki. He was a liberal Sarki but quick to anger. His counsellors liked him, but the common people hated him. In his time there was fierce war between Kano and Gobir.

The name of Sarkin Gobir was Sobah. If the Gobirawa defeated the Kanawa one day, the Kanawa defeated them the next. This state of affairs continued for a long time. In Kumbari’s time Sarkin Bornu May-Ali came to Kano to war. He encamped at Faggi for three nights without a battle being fought, since Shehu Tahiru and Shehu Bunduu prevented it. He returned to Bornu. Kumbari went to war with Dussi in the time of Sarkin Dussi Makuri and very nearly entered the town through the fierceness of his attack, but his advisers prevented him entering the town, saying to him, “Sarkin Kano, you have won the day, go home.” He listened to their advice and went home. In the Dussi war Sarkin Aujera Bugau was killed. Kumbari returned to Kano.

In his time shields were first brought from Nupe, which was then ruled over by Sarkin Nupe Jibrila. Guns were also brought. Mohamma Kumbari was active in collecting Jizia from the Kasua Kurmi, so that the market was nearly killed. The next year he collected Jizia in Kano and made even the mallams pay. There was so much disturbance that the Arabs left the town and went back to Katsina, and most of the poorer people in the town fled to the country.

Turaki Kuka Tunku said to Kumbari, “Sarki, if you do not let this Jizia alone, there will be no one left in the town but yourself and your servants.” The Sarki listened to him.

Kumbari made war against Kuddu Baudam. When he went out to Zanga he was advised to make haste, for it was said, “If you do not make haste you will not conquer Baudam, because there are many warriors in the town.”

He said, “I hear.”

When he came near the gate of the town, an arrow was launched at him and a battle ensued between the Kanawa and Kudawa. When Kumbari saw that the battle was growing hot, he took a spear in his hand and attacked the wall of the town. The men of Kano followed him under a shower of arrows. The Kudawa slaughtered the Kanawa, and the Kanawa slaughtered the Kudawa, until Kumbari reached the gate of the town. Had not the gate been closed he would have got in. The Kudawa ran away in a body to their houses. Kumbari camped at Zongon Dan Ingarma. Afterwards terms of peace were arranged and Kumbari returned to Kano.

His captains were 52 men who knew no fear: Sarkin Jarumai Aidajika, Berde Duguru, Dan Iya Tefiwa, Dan Iya Gajigi, Sarkin Majia Dandawa, Dan Tama Dan Arkaya, the Maji Yakufawa called Kunkuru Dageza, Dan Berde Madawaki Yabo, Galadima Dan Faramu, Sarkin Dawaki Mallam Bawa, Berde Sokana, Sarkin Jarumai Akallam, Jarmai Tugwai, Dan Hamuda, Dan Tankari Hamadi, Dan Tara-Tara Abbas, Sarkin Gano Bako, Dandama Kanwa Chilaya, Makama Chikudu, Lifidi Sayadu, Dan Maskara, Maidawaki Berde Dan Ashifu, Sarkin Damargu Baji Dan Gaba, Sarkin Bebeji Zakkari, Dan Bugai Chusa, Dan Beras, Sarkin Ringim Ada, Al-Berka, Sarkin Tsekkia Atoro, Dan Farzaki, Sarkin Burku Muni, Dan Samayila Chikewa, Jarumai Raadu, Gashin Bald Tsofo, Makarma Della, Dan Ajibiji Kakwoshi Magani, Dan Shanono, Dan Ali Duka, and others. Each one of them had no fear in fight, but Kumbari thought there was no one equal to himself.

He ruled 13 years.

— Kano Chronicle

Preceded by Muhammad Sharefa	Sarkin Kano; 1731-1743	Succeeded by Alhaji Kabe
