= Dadi (sultan) =

- Sarkin Kano
- Reign: 1670-1703
- Predecessor: Bawa
- Successor: Muhammad Sharefa
- House: Bagauda Dynasty
- Father: Bawa
- Mother: Ka Iya Gari

Dadi was a Sultan of Kano who reigned from 1670 to 1703.

== Biography in the Kano Chronicle ==
Below is a biography of Dadi from Palmer's 1908 English translation of the Kano Chronicle.

The 36th Sarki was Dadi. His mother’s name was Ka Iya Gari.

He wished to enlarge the city of Kano, but Shehu Mohamma prevented him. The next year Sarkin Kworarafa came to fight with Kano. The Sarki wished to go out and fight him outside, but the chiefs of Kano demurred and he remained in his house. The Kworarafai entered Kano by the Kofan Gadon Kaia, slaughtered the men of Kano, and reached Bakinrua. The Galadima Kofakani said to the Sarkin Kano, who was in the Pugachin Kishi with his Jarumai: “Establish ‘Tchibiri’ at Toji, and ‘Bundu’ at Rimi Bundu.”

The Galadima said to the Sarki, “Rise up! The Kworarafai have destroyed the best part of your town and have killed many men! They have penetrated to the Kurmi, and will attack the ‘palace.’”

The Sarki mounted his horse and went out, and came to the Kofan Fada with the Galadima and eunuchs and Jarumai. There he met all the Kanawa. He went to Rimin Bundu, took the “Bundu” and gave it to Dan Durma Mazza Mazza, and thence hastened to Kofa Bai. He found the Kworarafa had come near the “Tchibiri,” but everyone of them who came close died at once. The Sarkin Kworarafa told his people to take away the “Tchibiri.” The Kworarafai tried to charge, but they failed to seize it. The Sarki Kano came to the “Tchibiri,” and took it. On his right hand he had a hundred warriors, in front of him 99 chiefs, all of them mallams, and on his left hand 100 warriors. They were all slaughtered by the Kworarafai; only a few were left alive. Sarkin Kano fled to Daura. The Kworarafai followed him, to Jelli and then returned.

Of the men who were killed in this battle the chief were Dan Janbori, Dan Barra, Sarkin Buzza, Sarkin Durra, Dan Tanadi, Bundu, Sarkin Zabro, Magagi Bugaji, Sarkin Marua, Dan Garadu, Dan Raguma Giwa, Magaji Butachi, Dan Koamna, Magagi Sheggi, Dan Gamaji, Magaji Gantururu, Dan Dagazo, Magagi Tuntu, Sarkin Maguri, Dan Gauji, Magagi Garogi, Dan Tankaro, Dan Kargagi, Magaji Karfassa, Dan Kutuntu, Dan Toro, Dan Zaki Mazawa, Dan Bambawri, Kioto and others—in all 97 Sarkis.

In the time of Dadi the Sarkin Gaiya revolted. His name was Farm Dussi, the father of Mariamma. He was 3 years without paying the Sarkin Kano Jizia. Then the Sarkin Kano enticed him to an interview and killed him, some say with a razor, some at “Baura.” In consequence of this revolt Sarkin Dawaki Debba (called Kamna) went out and became Sarkin Aujera. The Sarki said to him, “I am making you Sarkin Aujera because I am afraid of Miga, Dussi and Gaiya revolting.”

Dadi ruled Kano 33 years and 8 months.

— Kano Chronicle

Preceded by Bawa	Sarkin Kano; 1670-1703	Succeeded by Muhammad Sharefa
