= Bawa (sultan) =

- Sarkin Kano
- Reign: 1660–1670
- Predecessor: Muhammad Kukuna
- Successor: Dadi
- House: Bagauda Dynasty
- Father: Muhammad Kukuna
- Mother: Lamis

Bawa was a Sultan of Kano who reigned from 1660 to 1670.

== Biography in the Kano Chronicle ==
Below is a biography of Bawa from Palmer's 1908 English translation of the Kano Chronicle.

The thirty-fifth Sarki was Bawa. His mother’s name was Lamis. He was a learned, just, and good Sarki.

In his time there was no war in Kano land, east and west, south and north.

Goron Pugachi, which Abubakr Kado, the son of Mohamma Rimfa, had built for his sons, had fallen into ruins, so Bawa repaired it.

Bawa fashioned the chair which is placed in the house of the great Turaki, that he might sit on it.

He built Pugachin Kishi as a school.

He had a friend who was called Dan Mallam Ali Diko. This Diko received such honour that a house for him was built in the palace called Soron Diko—in such honour was he held. He and the Sarki were inseparable. They rode together even at the Salla or elsewhere, since they had been the closest of friends from the time before Bawa had become Sarki. They had studied together. Diko always said his morning prayers at the Sarki’s house, and never returned home until after the evening prayer. In Bawa’s time Abdulahi, a great student of the Koran, came to Kano with his friends. He had a wonderfully captivating voice when reading. He took a house near Diko’s and preached after evening prayer. Diko asked, “Who is that man?” and was told it was Abdulahi, a stranger.

The next morning Diko sent to Abdulahi, and when he came, took him to the Sarki and told him to read to the Sarki. So he read the appointed portion of the Koran. After the Sarki had listened he would not let him go away, but built him a house near to the gate of Turaki Mainya. He was wont to amuse the Sarki at night by reading. During Ramadan Abdulahi preached to the Sarki during the vigils.

When Dan Lowan died the Sarki said to Abdulahi, “I make you Dan Lowan, and you will call to prayer.”

In Bawa’s time there were many holy men. He ruled Kano 10 years, 4 months and 20 days.

— Kano Chronicle

Preceded by Muhammad Kukuna	Sarkin Kano; 1660-1670	Succeeded by Dadi
