= Usman Zamnagawa =

- Sarkin Kano
- Reign: 1343–1349
- Predecessor: Tsamiya
- Successor: Yaji I
- Born: Usman Dan Shekarau
- House: Bagauda Dynasty
- Father: Shekarau I
- Mother: Kumyerku

Usman Zamnagawa Dan Shekarau, known as Usman Zamnagawa (also spelled Osumanu Zamnagawa) was the King of Kano from 1343 to 1349.

== Ascension and reign ==
Usman became King after he usurped his half-brother Tsamiya and murdered him, which earned him the epithet "Zamnagawa". His reign was characterized by peace throughout the land. At the behest of the Rumawa whose town had become populated and prosperous, he made his son "Sarkin Rumawa". He ruled for seven years and was succeeded by his nephew, Ali Yaji Dan Tsamiya.

== Biography in the Kano Chronicle ==
Below is a full biography of Usman Zamnagawa from Palmer's 1908 English translation of the Kano Chronicle.

The 10th Sarki was Zamnagawa, called Osumanu. The name of his mother was Kumyerku.

He was called Zamna-gawa because he killed Tsamia. He shut the doors of the palace and remained in his house for 7 days. After that day he went out. It is not known how Tsamia was made away with; whether Zamnagawa ate him or buried him, no one knows.

In the time of Zamnagawa, there was no war in the land, east and west, north and south. All was peace.

The Maguzawa left the city and went to live in the country at Fongui. The Rumawa came in a body to the Sarki. They said to him, “You are our Sarki, you have made a Sarkin Gazarzawa and a chief of the Kurmawa, make us a chief also.”

The Sarki said, “I hear.”

So they went back to their homes. The Sarki then took counsel with his men and said, “I want to give my son the chieftainship of the Rumawa.” And all his men said, “We agree.” So he gave his son the chieftainship of the Rumawa, whose town had become great and populous.

Zamnagawa ruled 7 years.

— Kano Chronicle

Preceded by Tsamiya	Sarkin Kano; 1343-1349	Succeeded by Yaji I
