= Gugua =

- Sarkin Kano
- Reign: 1247-1290
- Predecessor: Naguji
- Successor: Shekkarau I
- House: Bagauda Dynasty
- Father: Gijimasu
- Mother: Munsada

Gugua (also spelled Gujjua) was the King of Kano from 1247 to 1290. He was the son of Gijimasu and Munsada.

== Succession ==
Gugua was succeeded by Shekkarau I.

== Biography in the Kano Chronicle ==
Below is a biography of Gugua from Palmer's 1908 English translation of the Kano Chronicle.

Gugua was the 7th Sarki. His mother’s name was Munsada.

He was a man of much tact and subtlety. He had a face remarkable for its expression. He was liberal, eloquent, wise, and magnanimous.

All these qualities he turned to account in ruling the pagans and in discovering the mysteries of their god. They hated him. When he knew that they hated him he said to his men, “How shall I plan to get the better of these pagans and destroy their god.”

Ture and Galadina Bangare and Berde Kilmo said, “There can be no plan between them and us, nothing but war; we will conquer them and their god.”

When the pagans heard of this they said in secret, “When the ears hear, then is the body saved.” The chief pagans assembled at dead of night, 40 in number, at the foot of the sacred tree. Allah alone knows what took place there, They came forth when the sun rose and went to the Sarki.

They said, “O Sarki, when the night of Idi comes we will tell you the mysteries of our god.” He agreed, for he was glad at heart, and gave them gifts abundantly.

That night an apparition appeared to the Sarki in his sleep—a man with a red snake in his hand. He struck the Sarki with the snake and said to him, “Of two things choose one. Either thou mayest know the mysteries, in which case thou wilt die, or thou mayest not know the mysteries, in which case thou wilt not die.”

The Sarki said, “No! No! No!”

Now when the Sarki rose from his sleep he told his men what he had seen in the vision. They said to him,“What do you see in it?”

He said, “What do you see?”

They said, “We see war?”

The Sarki said nothing, he spoke not a word, but suddenly he was struck blind. He remained blind for many years.

He ruled Kano 44 years. 22 years he saw, and 22 he was blind. Then the power passed from him.

— Kano Chronicle

Preceded by Naguji	Sarkin Kano; 1247-1290	Succeeded by Shekkarau I
