= Shekkarau I =

- Sarkin Kano
- Reign: 1290–1307
- Predecessor: Gugua
- Successor: Tsamiya
- House: Bagauda Dynasty
- Father: Tsaraki
- Mother: Auta

Shekkarau I was a Sultan of Kano who reigned from 1290 to 1307.

== Biography in the Kano Chronicle ==
Below is a biography of Shekkarau I from Palmer's 1908 English translation of the Kano Chronicle.

The 8th Sarki was Shekkarau. His mother’s name was Auta.

When he became Sarki his men said to him, “Sarkin Kano, what do you see in the talk of the people of this city?”

He said, “I see nothing between us except things we can settle without fighting.”

They replied, “If you try to make peace with the people they will say that you are afraid. If they come to you and make smooth talk, turn away from them; then you would not be acting wrongly. If matters do not fall out thus we will fight them, and if we prevail over them we will cut the throats of all their chief men and destroy their god.”

These counsels prevailed. All the pagans came to the Sarki with many presents and said, “Sarki, and Lord over us, we come to you to say to you one word: do not take notice of what we have done, we pray you, but put away the slanderous counsel of your advisers. If the domains of a ruler are wide, he should be patient; if they are not so, he will not obtain possession of the whole country by impatience.”

The Sarki said to them, “Your talk is true,” and left them their customs and power.

They said, “Were it not for fear of what may result we would have told the Sarki the secrets of our god.”

The chief of them, Samagi, said, “If we show him the secrets of our god we shall lose all our power, and we and our generation will be forgotten.”

So the dispute continued till the Sarki died.

Shekkarau was Sarki 17 years.

— Kano Chronicle

Preceded by Gugua	Sarkin Kano; 1290-1307	Succeeded by Tsamiya
