= Warisi (king) =

- Sarkin Kano
- Reign: 1063-1095
- Predecessor: Bagauda
- Successor: Gijimasu
- House: Bagauda Dynasty
- Father: Bagauda
- Mother: Saju

Warisi was the King of Kano from 1063 to 1095. He was the son of Bagauda and Saju.

== Succession ==
Warisi was succeeded by his son Gijimasu.

== Biography in the Kano Chronicle ==
Below is a biography of Warisi from Palmer's 1908 English translation of the Kano Chronicle.

The 2nd Sarki was Warisi son of Bagoda. His mother’s name was Saju.

Those who were near him were Galadima Mele, Barwa Jimra, Buram (so called because he was the Sarki’s son), Maidawaki Abdulahi, Sarkin Gija Karmayi, Maidalla Zakar, Makuwu, Magaaiki Gawarkura, Makama Gargi, Jarumai Goshin Wuta, Jarmai Bakushi, Bardai Duna, and Dawaki Surfan. These were the most important chiefs, but there were many more.

Gawarkura said, “O Sarki of this land, if you wish to govern it, east and west and south and north, keep close to Gazarzawa, since it is the key of the country, and has not a strong god. When you come there, beguile the chiefs with gifts, and so rule them and their god.”

The Sarki replied, “No, I have not the strength; I am too old.”

Warisi ruled Kano 33 years.

— Kano Chronicle

Preceded by Bagauda	Sarkin Kano; 1063-1095	Succeeded by Gijimasu
