= Barbushe =

Barbushe was a hunter and pagan chief priest who was the most prominent leader of the indigenous animists of Dala, a place which would become the most important site in the history of the foundation of Kano, now a state in Northern Nigeria.

== Background ==
Indigenous minority of pagans still residing in an around northern Nigeria proport the oral record of Barbushe's lineage going back by the chiefs of the ancestral animist tribes recollection 40 to 50 generations before the arrival of Bagauda an Islam. Barbushe was the son of Buzame, who was the son of Garageje, who was one of the four sons of Dala. Dala was one of the first settlers around Dala Hill who came after the blacksmith, Kano, found iron ore and fertile land there. Dala is responsible for the refinement of the pagan religion, using his extensive knowledge of cultures and religions around the world to create a more sophisticated form of idol worship, which was heavily laced with middle eastern lore. The city of Dala and the Dala Hill are named after him.

=== Description ===
Barbushe was said to be a man of enormous stature. He was exceptionally strong and a skilled hunter who would kill elephants with his stick and carry them on his back for miles.

== Chief Priest of Tsumburbura ==
"Great father of Jimuna, we have come nigh to thy dwelling in supplication, Tsumburbura...Look on Tsumburbura, ye men of Kano ! Look toward Dala...I am the heir of Dala, like it or not, follow me ye must, perforce" - Barbushe

Barbushe was said to have attained his knowledge of pagan rites and of the pagan god Tsumburbura from his forefathers. Barbushe soon emerged as the most skilled sorcerer among the pagans as his power and knowledge of the secrets of tsumburbura was unrivaled. Other pagans including lesser priests came to look to him for guidance and he became their leader.

Tsumburbura was said to live in the Jakara River (known as "the black river" due to its color). The shrine of Tsumburbura was built around a baobab tree called "Shamus". Shamus was said to be perpetually still unless trouble was brewing in the land when it would shriek and smoke would emanate from the Jakara river. The pagans would then sacrifice an animal and if the smoking and shrieking stopped, trouble was averted but if it didn't, the trouble would reach them.

The Shamus was guarded by a man called "Mai Tsumburbura". Only Barbushe was allowed to enter and any other man who trespassed died. Barbushe lived on Dala Hill and never came down save for two days that coincided with Islamic Eid. When these days approached people from all over the land would gather at the feet of the hill and bring their offerings as sacrifices. These offerings included black he-goats, black fowls and black dogs. In the dark of the night, Barbushe would descend with drummers and lead the people to their god where they would sacrifice their offerings. The pagans would then dance around the shrine naked, reciting incantations until dawn and then they would eat. Barbushe would then tell the people prophecies of what's to come in the coming year.

=== The Lesser Chiefs ===
Barbushe had other chiefs including Gunzago, Gagiwa, Gubanasu, Doje, Janbere, Gamakura, Hangogo, Safatoro, Gartsangi, Bardoje, Kafantau, Nisau, Jandamisa and Jigira. The most prominent among these was Jandamisa who was the leader of the Rumawa, a clan who claim descent from the Byzantine Empire.

=== Barbushe's Great Prophecy and the Arrival of Bagauda ===
"A man shall come to this land with an army, and gain mastery over us, you will see him in the sacred place of Tsumburbura, if he comes not in your time, assuredly he will come in the time of your children, and will conquer all in this country, and forget you and yours and exalt himself and his people for years to come".

Barbushe's most famous prophecy spoke of a man who would come with an army and conquer them. Barbushe warned that this man will burn their sacred three, build a mosque and his people would gain dominion over them for years. When the pagans asked him how they could avert this, Barbushe responded "There is no cure but resignation". The prophecy came to fruition as not long after that, Bagauda and his people soon arrived in Kano, though its uncertain whether it was Bagauda himself or his grandson Gijimasu who first reached the people of Barbushe, it is commonly accepted that it was Bagauda.

It is said that when he reached Dala hill, only a few of the priest's acolyte's were still alive and Barbushe himself was dead. Barbushe's disciples quickly deduced that the prophecy had come true. Janbere remembering the words of his chief swore that if the people allowed these men into their land they would control their destinies until they lose their identity but the people ignored his warning, wondering where Bagauda would find the strength to conquer them.

Bagauda soon after waged war on the people and killed the leader of the pagans, giving birth to the kingdom of Kano in 999 CE. The Bagauda Dynasty would rule Kano for 808 years and lasted until 1807 CE.
