= Nawata and Gawata =

- Sarkin Kano
- Reign: 1134-1136
- Predecessor: Gijimasu
- Successor: Yusa
- House: Bagauda Dynasty
- Father: Gijimasu
- Mother: Munsada

Nawata and Gawata were the Kings of Kano from 1134 to 1136. They were the twin sons of Gijimasu and Munsada.

== Reign ==
The twin kings ruled jointly over Kano until one of them (the Kano Chronicle did not mention which one of the twins) died 7 months after he ascended the throne. The other twin died in 1136 after ruling alone for 17 months.

== Succession ==
The twin kings were succeeded in 1136 by their brother Yusa, also known as Tsaraki.

== Biography in the Kano Chronicle ==
Below is a biography of Nawata and Gawata from Palmer's 1908 English translation of the Kano Chronicle.

The rule of the twins Nawata and Gawata, children of Gijimasu, was the 4th reign. Their mother was Munsada. Together they ruled the city of Kano for 7 months; then one of them died; the other was left. The remaining one ruled 1 year and 5 months, and then he died.

Altogether they ruled 2 years.

— Kano Chronicle

Preceded by Gijimasu	Sarkin Kano; 1134-1136	Succeeded by Yusa
