= Abdullahi (sultan) =

- Sarkin Kano
- Reign: 1499-1509
- Predecessor: Muhammad Rimfa
- Successor: Muhammad Kisoki
- House: Bagauda Dynasty
- Father: Muhammad Rimfa
- Mother: Auwa

Abdullahi was a Sultan of Kano who reigned from 1499 to 1509.

== Biography in the Kano Chronicle ==
Below is a biography of Abdullahi from Palmer's 1908 English translation of the Kano Chronicle.

The 21st Sarki was Abdulahi. His mother’s name was Auwa. Her influence was very strong among the rulers of the day. She built the house at Doseyi, hence its name, “Giddan Madaki Auwa.”

In his time Ahmedu, who was afterwards Liman of Kano, arrived. Abdulahi conquered Katsina. He advanced as far as Katsina itself and encamped on the river near Tsagero. He remained 4 months at Tsagero and then went to Zukzuk and made war there. After conquering the men of Zaria he went on to Kadaura and to Kalam and made war on the inhabitants, after which he returned to Kano.

On his arrival home he found that Dagachi was preparing to revolt, and that the Madaki Auwa alone had prevented serious trouble, as her influence was very great in Kano. This was the reason that Sarkin Bornu came to attack Kano, and camped at Gunduawa. The Sarkin Kano went out to meet him together with his mallams and humbled himself before him. The Sarkin Bornu went back to his country. As soon as he was gone, Abdulahi beguiled Dagachi into submission and then turned him out of his office and gave his own slave the title.

He ruled Kano 10 years.

— Kano Chronicle

Preceded by Muhammad Rimfa	Sarkin Kano; 1499-1509	Succeeded by Muhammad Kisoki
