= Yusa (king) =

- Sarkin Kano
- Reign: 30 October 1136 – 8 December 1194
- Predecessor: Nawata and Gawata
- House: Bagauda Dynasty
- Father: Gijimasu
- Mother: Yankuma

Yusa , also known as Tsaraki , was the King of Kano from 1136 to 1194. He was the son of Gijimasu and Yankuma (or Yankuna).

== Reign ==
Yusa ascended the throne in 1136 after his twin brothers Nawata and Gawata died. He is known for building the walls of Kano.

== Succession ==
Yusa died in 1194 and was succeeded by his son Naguji.

== Biography in the Kano Chronicle ==
Below is a biography of Gijimasu from Palmer's 1908 English translation of the Kano Chronicle.

The 5th Sarki was Yusa, called Tsaraki. He was the son of Gijimasu.

He it was who completed the walls of Kano, as is well known. He raided Karaie, and camped at Badari 5 months till the inhabitants submitted to him. From Gurmai to Farinrua the people paid him tribute. Then he returned to his country.

His mighty men of war were Tuje, Fasau, Iyagari, and Kamfaragi. All these had no fear in war.

In Yusa’s reign shields (Garkwa) were first used.

He reigned 60 years. The name of his mother was Yankuma or Yankuna. He died.

— Kano Chronicle

Preceded by Nawata and Gawata	Sarkin Kano; 1136-1194	Succeeded by Naguji
