= Tsamiya =

- Sarkin Kano
- Reign: 1307 – 1343
- Predecessor: Shekarau I
- Successor: Usman Zamnagawa
- Born: Barandamasu
- House: Bagauda Dynasty
- Father: Shekarau I
- Mother: Salmata
- Religion: Muslim?

Barandamasu Tsamiya Dan Shekarau, known as Tsamiya (or Tsamia), was the King of Kano from 1307 until his death at the hand of his half brother Usman Zamnagawa in 1343.

== Reign ==
He ascended to the throne after the death of his father. Though his religion was unclear, during his early years as King, Tsamiya like his father experienced a tumultuous relationship with the pagans of Kano. It is said that the pagan practice of "tchibiri" was first practiced during his reign. The usage of longhorns were also introduced to Kano during his reign.

Tsamiya was noted by the Kano Chronicles to be a fearless and courageous warrior and a noble leader. He was said to have had nine warriors who were "equal to a thousand"; Madawaki, Bajeri, Burdi-Kunkuru, Dan-kududufi-Tanko, Dan Burran Bakaki, Jarumai Garaji, Makama Gumki, Danunus Baurire, Sarkin Damargu Gabdodo and Jekafada Masab. Tsamiya formed a formidable army which struck fear into the hearts of the pagans. The pagans conceded to pay him tax to avoid war after consulting with their gods through their chief. They also offered him 200 slaves which he refused. The king then sent word to the pagans that he intended to burn their sacred tree which led to them coming out in full force with shields of elephant hide and spears to protect their gods. The pagans were however defeated and forced to flee. Tsamiya was then able to arrive at a compromise with the pagans, appointing from among them "Sarkin Tchibiri", "Sarkin Gazarzawa", and "Sarkin Kurmi".

"Love trausnlits love, and hate transmits hate; there is nothing between us except bows and spears and swords and shields; there is no deceit and no deceiver except he who is afraid." - Tsamiya addressing the pagans of Kano.

=== Personal life ===
Tsamiya was the son of the 8th Sarkin Kano, Shekarau and Salmata. With Maganarku, he sired, Ali Yaji and Muhammad Bugaya who would later go on to become the 11th and 12th Rulers of Kano respectively. Yaji became the first Sultan of Kano and Bugaya the second.

=== Death ===
Tsamiya was toppled and killed in his palace by his half brother, Usman Zamnagawa. Zamnagawa then locked the doors of the palace for a week and how he disposed of his body remains a mystery. It is not known whether he buried his brother or ate him.

== Biography in the Kano Chronicle ==
Below is a full biography of Tsamiya from Palmer's 1908 English translation of the Kano Chronicle.

The ninth Sarki was Tsamia, called Barandamasu. His mother's name was Salmata.

In his time the cult of Tchibiri was first practised. When he came to the throne he assembled the pagans and said to them, "Love transmits love, and hate transmits hate; there is nothing between us except bows and spears and swords and shields; there is no deceit and no deceiver except he who is afraid."

Tsamia excelled all men in courage, dignity, impetuosity in war, vindictiveness, and strength. He had 9 men who were equal to a thousand. The greatest was Madawaki Bajeri, and after him Burdi-Kunkuru, Dan-kududufi-Tanko, Dan Burran Bakaki, Jarumai Garaji, Makama Gumki, Danunus Baurire, Sarkin Damargu Gabdodo and Jekafada Masabi. When these men came to the battlefield with their Sarki they feared nothing, but were ever victorious.

Now when the pagans of Kano heard the words of their Sarki, fear seized their hearts. They assembled at the place of their god and prayed to be shown who would gain the mastery, they or the Sarki. It was foretold them that they would be overcome. They knew that their god would not lie.

Their chief said, "I see no means of deliverance from the Sarki except we pay him money."

His men said, "We agree."

So they were made to pay jizia. They collected 200 slaves within 7 days and took them to the Sarki.

The Sarki said, "I do not want your slaves."

So they returned home.

Now on a certain Saturday the Sarki sent a messenger called Marukarshi to them saying to him: "Tell them that on Thursday I am coming to Kagwa, if Allah so wills, that I may enter, and see what is inside. I will destroy the wall and burn the tree." So the messenger went and told them. When they heard the word of the Sarki, they assembled on the Thursday at the place of their god, pagans of town and country alike—a crowd as had never been seen before, Of drums and cymbals there were 1,400 and more than 400 captains of spearmen. They marched round the place of their god from evening until the morning. When the morning broke Sarkin Kano came forth from his house, and went to the place of the god. In front of him were 70 men, each with a shield made of elephant's hide. When the Sarki came near to the place of the god he prevented the pagans entering.

As the fight waxed hot, the Sarki cried,"Where is Bajeri?" Bajeri heard the words of the Sarki, and took a spear and rushed into the battle, cutting his way until he reached the wall of the sacred place. He entered, and seeing a man with his back against the tree holding a red snake, attacked him. The man leapt up and made a great shout; fire breathed from his mouth until smoke filled the whole place round about; he rushed out; and, in his attempt to flee, made for the water-gate, followed by the Sarki, and plunged into the water. The Sarki and his followers stayed hunting for the man in the water, but he escaped and went to Dankwoi, where they left him. Hence it is that if any warrior drinks the water of Dankwoi he does not prevail in battle. The Sarki returned to the tree, and destroyed the wall together with all else connected with "Tchibiri" which was beneath the tree. All the pagans had in the meantime fled, except Makare Dan Samagi and Dunguzu Dan Dorini.

The Sarki said to them, "Why do you not run away?"

They said, "Where were we to run to?"

"Praise be to God," said the Sarki.

"Tell me the secret of your god." They told him.

When he had heard, the Sarki said to Danguzu, "I make yon Sarkin Tchibiri."

He said to Makare, "I make you Sarkin Gazarzawa."

He said to Gamazo, "I make you Sarkin Kurmi."

In the time of this Sarki long horns were first used in Kano. The tune that they played was "Stand firm, Kano is your city."

He reigned 37 years.

— Kano Chronicle

Preceded by Shekkarau I	Sarkin Kano; 1307-1343	Succeeded by Osumanu Zamnagawa
