= Umaru (sultan) =

- Sarkin Kano
- Reign: 1410-1421
- Predecessor: Kanajeji
- Successor: Dauda
- House: Bagauda Dynasty
- Father: Kanajeji
- Mother: Yatara

Umaru (or Umar) was a Sultan of Kano who reigned from 1410 to 1421.

== Biography in the Kano Chronicle ==
Below is a biography of Umaru from Palmer's 1908 English translation of the Kano Chronicle:

The 14th Sarki was Umaru. He mother’s name was Yatara. He was a mallam earnest in prayer. He was a pupil of Dan Gurdamus Ibrahimu and a friend of Abubakra.

When he became Sarkin Kano, his friend upbraided and left him and went to Bornu, where he remained 11 years. On his return to Kano, finding Umaru still Sarkin Kano, he said to him: “O Umaru, you still like the fickle dame who has played you false, with whom better reflection refuses to be troubled. In time you will be disgusted, and get over your liking for her. Then regret will be futile even if you do regret.”

He preached to him about the next world and its pains and punishments. He reviled this world and everything in it. Umaru said, “I accept your admonition.”

He called together all the Kanawa, and said to them: “This high estate is a trap for the erring: 1 wash my hands of it.”

Then he resigned, and went away with his friend. He spent the rest of his life in regret for his actions while he had been Sarki. Hence he was called “Dan Terko.”

He ruled 12 years. In his time there was no war and no robbery. The affairs of Kano were put into the hands of the Galadima. For this reason it was said of the Galadima Dana that he was the “Trusted guardian of the city, the dust-heap of disputes.”

— Kano Chronicle

| Preceded by Kanajeji | Sarkin Kano; 1410-1421 | Succeeded by Dauda |
