= Song of Bagauda =

Hausa-language homiletic poem and a Kano kinglist

The Song of Bagauda (Hausa: Waƙar Bagauda) is a Hausa oral poem from Kano and is believed to preserve an ancient core, though it was expanded over time. The poem is an old homiletic kinglist which preserves the names and deeds of rulers going back several centuries, and is widely known in Kano and is recited by streetside beggars around the city.

It is believed to be a native Hausa tradition, as evidenced by its extensive use of imagery drawn from the Hausa peasant economy, and therefore represents a Hausa commentary on history and on the confrontation between Islam and paganism. This is notable, as much of the scholarship on the region's history had previously been based largely on documents produced by Fulani scholars, with only scant commentary from the Hausa, especially from the peasantry.

The earliest known written versions of the poem date from around the 1920s but the song most likely has more ancient origins. Local tradition in Kano believes the poem to dates to the time of Bagauda, the first chief of Kano, who reigned in the 11th century. It has been handed down from generation to generation, and, on the death of each chief, a couplet or stanza is added to it. The poem is widely recognised in Kano city and is known to have always been sung by beggars. The chronology of the kingslist contained in the poem diverges from the more reliable Kano Chronicle by about two and a half centuries, though the two sources agree to within a year back as far as the reign of Alwali who was driven out of Kano in 1807.

The text of the poem was recorded in 1960 by the Hausaist Isa Kurawa, who was at that time sub-editor of the Kano Native Authority newspaper Sodangi. In 1962, Kurawa informed Mervyn Hiskett of the poem's existence and gave him his compiled version. Kurawa had obtained this version from the dictation of an old Hausa woman named Hawwa, who claimed to be 100 years old. She had learned the poem as a young girl from the grandfather of a certain Malam Mu'azu, an Islamic scholar living in Kano. Mu'azu possessed a manuscript containing his grandfather's version of the poem, which differed slightly from Hawwa's. Besides these two sources, Hiskett independently obtained another manuscript from Muhammadu Nasiru, then the scholarly headmaster of the Shahuci Judicial School in Kano. Hiskett collated the various ajami texts to produce a Latin transliteration and an English translation, published in 1964 and 1965 respectively.

The poem is divided into four major sections: an opening eulogy to the Islamic prophet Muhammad; a kinglist; a long homiletic epilogue on the vanity of the world; and a section on fatawi, or rulings on points of Muslim law, including on proper procedures for carrying out Islamic customs related to food, sickness, death, burial, and worship. The poem's composition is strongly influenced by the Arabic metre wāfir and conforms to the pattern of the Classical Arabic qasida.

== See also ==
- Kano Chronicle
