= Muhammad Sharefa =

- Sarkin Kano
- Reign: 1703-1731
- Predecessor: Dadi
- Successor: Kumbari
- House: Bagauda Dynasty
- Father: Dadi
- Mother: Mariamma

Muhammad Sharefa was a Sultan of Kano who reigned from 1703 to 1731.

== Biography in the Kano Chronicle ==
Below is a biography of Muhammad Sharefa from Palmer's 1908 English translation of the Kano Chronicle.

The 37th Sarki was Mohamma Sharefa, son of Dadi. His mother’s name was Mariamma. She was the daughter of Sarkin Gaiya Farin-Dussi.

In Sharefa’s time, the men of Gaiya became very influential in Kano. Sharefa was a powerful Sarki. He introduced 7 practices in Kano all of which were robbery, namely, Karo, Rinsua, Matafada, Yan Dawaki, Kuaru, Jizia of maidens on marriage, and Jizian Kasua Kurmi. He invented many other methods of extortion.

Sharefa sent Wombai Debba to war. The Wombai left Kano for Kirru, and making war on it captured much spoil and many men. News came to Sharefa that the Wombai had sacked Kirru and that there was nothing in the town but ashes. Sharefa said nothing, but when the Wombai Debba returned to Kano asked him what he meant by such work. The Wombai said, “I like Kano,” speaking in riddles.

In Sharefa’s time the Sarkin Jamfara, Yakubu Dan Mazura, came to make war on Kano. A battle was fought at Yergana in which the men of Jamfara defeated the men of Kano. The men of Kano fled and deserted the Sarki, who was left with Hasan Kanni, Kasheka Bugau, the Turaki Mainya Allah Hikimaiyi, Berdi Kereria Yashibka and Dogara Gateri. They all lost their beads.

Sharefa said to them, “Does not a single one of you know the way back to Kano?”

They said, “No.”

Hasan Kanni said, “I know the way to the city.”

The Sarki said to him, “Show me the road.”

So he showed the Sarki the road until they came to the Rimin Bugunsua. The Sarki entered the town and his house, and no one was allowed to see him, so great was his wrath. Hasan Kanni Bugau, Allah Nikimaiyi and Yashibka obtained great honour from the Sarki because of the fight at Yergana. After this the Sarki sent out Sarkin Gaiya Jan Hazo, and told him to put a wall round Gaiya. Walls were built, too, at Tarkai, Tsokkua, Gano, Dawaki and many other towns. When Bugau became Turaki Kuka he sent messengers to Sarkin Yawuri to ask him for “Algaitas.” The Sarkin Yawuri gave him ten Algaitas, and three “Kurra-Kurra.” The messenger came with them to Turaki Bugau. Bugau kept them 3 months, and sent them to the Maidaki Mariamma, since she was a great personage. There was no woman like her in the 7 Hausa states.

In Sharefa’s time cowries first came to Hausaland.

The Sarki was a mighty warrior. Among his captains were Sarkin Dawaki Sodi, Dan Iya Maji Kudu, Dan Iya Mallam Shadu, Sarkin Jarumai, Mallam Bawa, Sarkin Jarumai Akwuria, Dan Iya Dashina, Sarkin Jarumai Ibrahim, Limanin Beradai Dodo, Berde Ba Kuddu, Sarkin Jarumai Abdullah, Galadima Kofa-Kanni. These all fought under Dadi. There were also Maidawaki Magani, Dan Sudu Durraman, Ali Uban Dan Kurkuti, Yahaya Uban Dan Maji Babba, Sarkin Damargu Gabo, Sarkin Fulani Bebeji Abdua, Sarkin Fulani Dania, Sarkin Fulani Bugai Beriss, Sarkin Gaiya Alwali, Sarkin Fulani Sankara Dubai, Berde Alhaji, Madawakin Gawo Bajiddah and others. When they went to war they never ran away, but always were victorious, even though the Sarki were not present.

Sharefa ruled Kano 28 years and 10 months.

— Kano Chronicle

Preceded by Dadi	Sarkin Kano; 1703-1731	Succeeded by Kumbari
