= Kanajeji =

- Sarkin Kano
- Reign: 1390 - 1410
- Predecessor: Bugaya
- Successor: Umaru
- Born: Kanajeji
- House: Bagauda Dynasty
- Father: Yaji I
- Mother: Aunaka
- Religion: Islam

Kanajeji Dan Yaji , known as Kanajeji, was the 13th ruler of Kano and, for a period, the ruler of Zazzau. He reigned from 1390 - 1410. Like his father, Yaji I, Kanajeji was an intrepid king whose reign was characterized by war, conquest, and religious reformation. Kanajeji engaged in two long and pivotal wars with Umbatu and Zazzau, and eventually prevailed in both, after lengthy feuds. He took Umbatu in four attempts, and Zazzau after two battles. He also renewed the suzerainty his father had imposed over the Kwararafa. However, in a bid to conquer Zazzau, his reign also saw the return of the pagan practices his father sought to expunge. He is credited with revolutionizing Kano's army through the introduction of quilted leather armors (lifidi), steel armors, coats of mail, and iron helmets.

== Lineage and Accession ==
He was the son of the first Sultan of Kano, Ali Yaji Dan Tsamiya and Aunaka. The short reign of his father's successor, his uncle, Muhammad Bugaya, was pervaded with peace and tranquility because Yaji had finally solidified their family's grasp on Kano. His uncle sought repose and handed over official duties to the Galadima. Kanajeji succeeded Bugaya after his death in 1390.

== Reign ==
Like his father, Kanajeji he immediately set out to extend the reach of the Sultanate, engaging in multiple conquests all over the region. He requested that the Kwararafa paid tribute to him like they did his father so they sent him two hundred slaves. The Kwararafa continued to send him slaves while he continued to send them horses.

=== War with Umbatu ===
Kanajeji's first attempt at subduing Umbatu resulted in an emphatic defeat. The casualties Kano suffered forced him to modernize his army by introducing armor, iron helmets, and coats of mail. He returned to Umbatu twice more in two successive years but failed both times. However, after failing a third time, he vowed " I will not return to Kano, if Allah wills, until I conquer the enemy.". The fourth attempt, he utilized the same strategy that his father had used to conquer the Kwararafa. He started a siege which lasted for two years until the people of Umbatu were starved out and forced to concede defeat. They gave the Sultan a thousand male slaves and a thousand female slaves from among their children, and then gave him another two thousand slaves.

"No one shall again conquer Umbatu as I have conquered it, though he may gain spoil."

=== First Battle With Zazzau ===
After Umbatu, Kanajeji then set his sights on the Hausa State of Zazzau. This was Kano's first recorded war with Zazzau. He camped at Turunku, where their armies clashed. The men of Zazzau defeated the men of Kano after which they taunted "What is Kano? Kano is 'bush!'".

=== Reintroduction of pagan practices ===
Sarkin Tchibiri: "Re-establish the god that your father and grandfather destroyed...Whatever you wish for in this world, do as our forefathers did of old"

Kanajeji: "True, but tell me what I am to do with it...Show me, and I will do even as they did."

Disappointed by his defeat in Zazzau, the Sultan of Kano sought advice as to how to defeat them. He was advised by the Sarkin Tchibiri to reintroduce the gods his father and grandfather had outlawed. He was then guided through a few pagan rituals by Sarkin Tchibiri while singing the "Song of Barbushe".

=== Return to Zazzau ===
A year after the first battle, Kanajeji set out to Zazzau once again. This time he camped at Gadaz and the army of Zazzau came to meet him. The army of Kano slayed the King of Zazzau and most of their chiefs. The men of Zazzau fled for their lives. He entered Zazzau and reigned near Shika for eight months where he gained much spoil from the people of Zazzau.

"Son of Kano, hurler of the kere, Kanajeji, drinker of the water of Shika, preventer of washing in the Kubanni, Lord of the town, Lord of the land"

== Death ==
Kanajeji died in 1410. The three subsequent rulers of Kano were his sons, Umaru, Dauda, and Abdullahi Burja.

== Biography in the Kano Chronicle ==
Below is a full biography of Kanajeji from Palmer's 1908 English translation of the Kano Chronicle.

The 13th Sarki was Kanajeji. His father’s name was Yaji. His mother’s name was Aunaka.

He was a Sarki who engaged in many wars. He hardly lived in Kano at all, but scoured the country round and conquered the towns. He lived for some time near the rock of Gija. He sent to the Kworarafa and asked why they did not pay him tribute. They gave him 200 slaves. Then he returned to Kano and kept sending the Kworarafa horses while they continued to send him slaves.

Kanajeji was the first Hausa Sarki to introduce “Lifidi” and iron helmets and coats of mail for battle. They were introduced because in the war at Umbatu the losses had been so heavy. He visited Kano and returned to Umbatu the next year, but he had no success in the war. He returned a second time to Kano, and again went out the following year. He again failed, but said, “I will not return home, if Allah wills, until I conquer the enemy.” He remained at Betu 2 years. The inhabitants, unable to till their fields, were at length starved out, and had to give in to him. They gave him a thousand male, and a thousand female slaves, their own children. They also gave him another 200 slaves. Then peace was made.

The Sarkin Kano said: “No one shall again conquer Umbatu as I have conquered it, though he may gain spoil.” In the following year the Sarki made war on Zukzuk and sat down in Turunku. The men of Zukzuk came out and defeated the Kano host, saying, “What is Kano! Kano is ‘bush.’”

The Sarkin Kano went back to Kano in a rage and said: “What shall I do to conquer these men of Zukzuk?”

The Sarkin Tchibiri said: “Re-establish the god that your father and grandfather destroyed.”

The Sarki said: “True, but tell me what I am to do with it.” The Sarkin Tchibiri said: “Cut a branch from this tree.”

The Sarki cut off a branch. When it was cut, the Sarki found a red snake in the branch. He killed the snake, and made two huffi with its skin. He then made 4 dundufa and 8 kuntakuru from the branch. These objects he took to Dankwoi and threw them into the water and went home.

After waiting 40 days he came back to the water, and removed the objects to the house of Sarkin Tchibiri. Sarkin Tchibiri sewed the rest of the snake’s skin round the drums and said to Kanajeji, “Whatever you wish for in this world, do as our forefathers did of old.”

Kanajeji said: “Show me, and I will do even as they did.” The Sarkin Tchibiri took off his robe and put on the huffi of snake’s skin and walked round the tree 40 times, singing the song of Barbushe. Kanajeji did as Sarkin Tchibiri did, and walked round the tree 40 times.

The next year he set out to war with Zukzuk. He encamped at Gadaz. The Sarkin Zukzuk came out and they fought; the men of Kano killed the Sarkin Zukzuk. The Zukzuk men lied, scattered in ones and twos, and the chiefs of Zukzuk were killed. The Sarkin Kano entered Zukzuk and lived there close to the Shika 8 months. The people gave him a vast amount of tribute.

Because of this feat the song of Kanajeji was sung, which runs: “Son of Kano, hurler of the here, Kanajeji, drinker of the water of Shika, preventer of washing in the Kubanni, Lord of the town, Lord of the land.”

Kanajeji returned to Kano. Among his great men of war were Berdi Gutu, Jarumai Sabbo, Maidawaki Babaki, Makama Toro, Dan Burram Jatau, Jakafada Idiri, Jambori Sarkin Zaura Bugau, Lifidi Buzuzu and Dan Akassan Goderi.

He reigned 20 years.

— Kano Chronicle

Preceded by Bugaya	Sarkin Kano; 1390-1410	Succeeded by Umaru
