= List of rulers of Kano =

Emir of Kano
- 19th century flag of the Kano Emirate

Incumbent
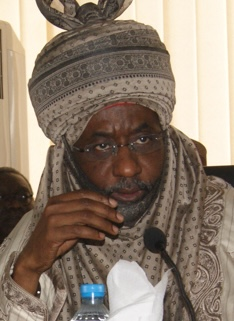
- Muhammadu Sanusi II since 23 May 2024

Details
- Style: His Highness
- First monarch: Suleiman 1805–1819
- Formed: 1807
- Residence: Gidan Rumfa (official); Gidan Makama; Filin Chiranchi
- Appointer: Taran Kano (Hereditary)

This is a list of rulers of Kano since the establishment of the Bagauda Dynasty in 999. The early rulers are known almost exclusively from a single source, the Kano Chronicle, which was composed in the late 19th century.

== Bagauda dynasty (998–1809) ==
Names and dates taken from John Stewart's African States and Rulers (2006):

=== Kings (998 – 1349) ===
#	Name	Reign Start	Reign End
1	Bagauda (or Yakano)	December 998	January 1063
2	Warisis (or Warisi)	January 1063	January 1095
3	Gajemasu (or Gijimasu)	January 1095	November 1133
4	Nawata (joint ruler with twin brother Gawata)	November 1133	October 1135
5	Gawata (joint ruler with twin brother Nawata)	November 1133	October 1135
6	Yusa (or Tsaraki)	October 1135	December 1193
7	Naguji	December 1193	May 1247
8	Gujjua (or Gugua)	May 1247	January 1290
9	Shekarau I (or Shekkarau I)	January 1290	July 1306
10	Tsamiya (or Tsamia; also Barandamasu)	July 1306	June 1342
11	Usmanu Zamnagawa	June 1342	March 1349

=== Sultans (1349 – 1807) ===
#	Name	Reign Start	Reign End
12	Yaji I	March 1349	February 1385
13	Bugaya	February 1385	December 1389
14	Kanejeji (or Kanajeji)	December 1389	May 1409
15	Umaru	May 1409	January 1421
16	Dauda	January 1421	January 1437
17	Abdullahi Burja	January 1437	January 1452
18	Dakauta	January 1452 (One night)	
19	Atuma	January 1452	February 1452
20	Yakubu	February 1452	September 1462
21	Muhammad Rumfa	September 1462	August 1498
22	Abdullahi	August 1498	May 1508
23	Muhammad Kisoki	May 1508	August 1564
24	Yakufu	August 1564	January 1565
25	Dauda Abasama I	January 1565	March 1565
26	Abu Bakr Kado	March 1565	May 1572
27	Muhammad Shashere	May 1572	January 1582
28	Muhammad Zaki	January 1582	December 1617
29	Muhammad Nazaki	December 1617	November 1622
30	Kutumbi	November 1622	January 1648
31	al-Hajj	January 1648	January 1649
32	Shekkarau II	January 1649	December 1650
33	Muhammad Kukuna	December 1650	December 1651
34	Soyaki	December 1651	
–	Muhammad Kukuna (Restored)	December 1651	September 1659
35	Bawa	September 1659	1670
36	Dadi	1670	May 1702
37	Muhammad Sharefa	May 1702	July 1730
38	Kumbari	July 1730	February 1743
39	al-Hajji Kabe	February 1743	May 1752
40	Yaji II	May 1752	May 1768
41	Babba Zaki	May 1768	February 1776
42	Dauda Abasama II	February 1776	December 1780
43	Muhammad Alwali II	December 1780	March 1807

== Suleiman's reign (1807–1819) ==
#	Name	Reign Start	Reign End	Notes
1	Suleimanu dan Aba Hama	1807	1819	Shehu Suleiman dan Aba Hama from the Fulani Mundubawa clan led the Jihad of Usman dan Fodio in Kano, and overthrew the almost eight-centuries-old Bagauda dynasty. He pledged allegiance to the Sokoto Caliphate and became the first emir of the Kano Emirate. He was a wise and just king.

== Dabo dynasty (1819–present) ==
#	Name	Reign Start	Reign End	Notes
2	Ibrahim Dabo dan Mahmudu	1819	1846	Shehu Ibrahim Dabo from the Fulani Sullubawa clan was a mystic and scholar. He is the eponymous founder of the Dabo dynasty as the khalifa of Emir Suleiman which has ruled Kano for over two hundred years.
3	Usman I Maje Ringim dan Dabo	1846	1855	Son of Dabo
4	Abdullahi Maje Karofi dan Dabo	1855	1883	Son of Dabo
5	Muhammadu Bello dan Dabo	1883	1893	Son of Dabo
6	Muhammadu Tukur dan Bello	1893	1894	
7	Aliyu Babba dan Maje Karofi	1894	1903	Aliyu was on a visit to Sokoto in 1903 when Kano fell to the British during the Battle of Kano. Aliyu gathered his forces on a long march to retake the city but his cavalry was annihilated by the Lord Lugard at the sanguinary Battle of Kwatarkwashi. His brother Wambai Abbas was proclaimed Emir by the British and Aliyu subsequently went on a Mahdist Hijra north into the Sahara but was captured by the French and handed over to the British who exiled him to Yola and then Lokoja
8	Muhammad Abbass dan Maje Karofi	1903	1919	First Emir to reign under the Kano Emirate Council.
9	Usman II dan Maje Karofi	1919	1926	
10	Abdullahi Bayero dan Abbas	1926	1953	Bayero was a scholarly-king who promoted traditional Islamic education and encouraged trade in the city-state
11	Muhammadu Sanusi I dan Bayero	1953	1963	Sanusi I was the first Emir to be dethroned by the government
12	Muhammad Inuwa dan Abbas	April 1963	October 1963	Second shortest reign after Sultan Dakauta (who reigned for one night in January 1452)
13	Ado Bayero (San Kano) dan Abdu Bayero	1963	2014	Ado Bayero had the longest reign in the royal history of the city-state spanning over five decades. His reign started three years before the fall of the first republic and saw 14 heads of state and 17 state governors. His funeral was the largest gathering in the modern history of northern Nigeria.
14	Muhammadu Sanusi II dan ciroma Aminu Sanusi Bayero dan Muhammadu Sanusi I	2014	2020	Sanusi II was the first Sullubawa prince since the 19th century founding of the Dabo dynasty to become emir not through royal primogenitureship. His six-year reign marks also the first to usher in a dynastic generational-shift away from the old regime of 1903; he is the second emir to be dethroned after his grandfather Sir Sanusi I
15	Aminu dan Takawa Ado Bayero Jikan Sarki Alhaji	2020	2024	
16	Muhammadu Sanusi II dan Nadawaki Aminu dan Muhammadu Sanusi I	2024	present	

== Lineages ==
=== Hausa rulers ===
Lineage of the Bagauda dynasty

Kings of Kano (Sarkin Kano)
Bauwo	Kaunasu
1 Daud; Bagoda; 999–1063	Saju
2 Warisi; 1063–1095	Yānas
Munsada	3 Gijimasu; 1095–1134	Yankuma or Yankuna
4 Nawata; 1134–1136 (co-ruler 1134)	4 Gawata co-ruler 1134	5 Yusa; Tsaraki; 1136–1194	Muntáras or Yankuma
Gijimasu	Munsada	6 Naguji; 1194–1247
7 Gugua; 1247–1290	Tsaraki	Auta
Salmata	8 Shekkarau I 1290–1307	Kumyerku
Maganarku	9 Tsamia; Barandamasu; 1307–1343	10; Osumanu; Zamnagawa; 1343–1349
Sultans of Kano
11; Yaji; Ali; 1349–1385	Aunaka	12; Bugaya; Mohammad; 1349–1385
Yatara	13; Kanajeji; 1347–1390	Tekidda
Auta
14; Umaru; 1410–1421	15; Dauda; 1421–1438	16; Abdulahi; Burja; 1438–1452	Tasafi
17; Dakauta; 1452 (1 day) (deposed)	19; Yakubu; 1452–1463	Fasima; Berana
18; Atuma; 1452 (deposed)	20; Mohamma; Rimfa; 1463–1499	Auwa
21; Abdulahi; 1499–1509	Lamis	25; Abubakr; Kado; 1565–1573 (deposed)
Tunus	22; Mohamma; Kisoki; 1509–1565	Hausatu
Zuhara	23; Yakufu; 1565	Fasuma	27; Mohamma; Zaki; 1582–1618	Kursu
24; Dauda; Abasama I 1565 (exiled)	26; Mohamma; Shashere; 1573–1582 (deposed)	Dada	28; Mohamma; Nazaki; 1618–1623
Fudima	29; Kutumbi; 1623–1648
Fari	30; Al Haji; 1648–1649 (deposed)	Goro
31; Shekkarau II; 1649–1651	Fasuma	32,34; Mohamma; Kukuna; 1651–1652; 1652–1660 (deposed twice)	Lamis
33; Soyaki; 1652 (deposed)	Ka Iya Gari	35; Bawa; 1660–1670
Mariamma	36; Dadi; 1670–1703
37; Mohamma; Sharefa; 1703–1731	Duki	Yerduna	40; Mohamma; Yaji; 1753–1768	Baiwa
Zama; Zenabu	38; Mohamma; Kumbari; 1731–1743	41; Babba; Zaki; 1768–1776	42; Dauda; Abasama II; 1776–1781	43; Mohamma; Alwali; 1781–1807
39; Alhaji; Kabe; 1743–1753

=== Fulani rulers ===
Tree of Emirs of Kano

Clan of Mundubawa	Clan of Sullubawa
Aba Hama	Mahmudu
1 Suleimanu; 1805–1819	2 Ibrahim; Dabo; 1819–1846
3 Usman I Maje Ringim; 1846–1855	4 Abdullahi; Maje Karofi; 1855–1883	5 Muhammadu; Bello; 1883–1893
7 Aliyu; Babba; 1894–1903	8 Muhammadu; Abbass; 1903–1919	9 Shehu; Usman II; 1919–1926	6 Muhammadu; Tukur; 1893–1894
10; Abdallahi; Bayero; 1926–1953	12; Muhammadu; Inuwa; 1963
11; Muhammadu; Sanusi I 1954–1963	13; Ado; Bayero; 1963–2014
Aminu; Sanusi	15; Aminu; Ado Bayero; 2020–2024
14; Sanusi; Muhammadu; Sanusi II; First time 2014–2020; Second time 2024-Date

== See also ==
- Hausa Kingdoms
- Kano Chronicle
- Timeline of Kano
