= Bagauda =

King of Kano (r. 999 – 1063)

Sarkin Kano
- Reign: 999 – 1063
- Predecessor: None (title established)
- Successor: Warisi
- Born: Daud
- Died: 1063; Sheme (in modern day Kano State, Nigeria)
- Dynasty: Bagauda Dynasty
- Father: Bawo
- Mother: Kaunasu

Daud Dan Bawo , also known as Bagauda or Yakano , was the first King of Kano, in what is now northern Nigeria, reigning from 999 to 1063. He established a dynasty which would go on to rule the state for over 800 years. According to the Kano Chronicle, all subsequent kings and sultans of Kano descended from him.

== Family ==
Bagauda's father was Bawo (also spelled Bauwo). Bagauda had a son, Warisi, with Saju. Warisi succeeded his father as king in 1063.

== Song of Bagauda ==
The Song of Bagauda is a traditional Hausa poem written in honour of Bagauda.

== Biography in the Kano Chronicle ==
Below is a biography of Bagauda from Palmer's 1908 English translation of the Kano Chronicle.

Then came Bagoda with his host, and was the first Sarki of this land. His name was Daud. His mother's name was Kaunasu. He began by occupying Dirani for two years. Thence he moved to Barka, and built a city called Talutawa, where he reigned two years.

The names of the pagan chiefs whom Bagoda met, were Jankare, Biju, Buduri (who had many children—about a hundred) and Ribo. Bagoda overcame them, and killed their leader Jankare. Then he came to Sheme, and found Gabusani, Bauni, Gazauri, Dubgege, Fasataro, and Bakin Bunu there. He conquered them all, and built a city, and reigned at Sheme 66 years.

— Kano Chronicle

Preceded by none	Sarkin Kano; 999-1063	Succeeded by Warisi
