= Kano Chronicle =

Arabic-language manuscript that lists the rulers of Kano

- Also known as: تاريخ أرباب هذا البلاد المصممة كان
- Date: late 1880s
- Place of origin: Kano
- Language: Arabic
- Author: Malam Barka?

The Kano Chronicle (Arabic: تاريخ أرباب هذا البلاد المصممة كان; The history of the masters of this country it was designed) is an Arabic-language manuscript that lists the rulers of Kano.

== Summary ==
The Kano Chronicle is a list of rulers of Kano stretching back to the 10th century AD. It tells of eleven clans of animists (such as salt extractors, brewers, or smiths) who were warned by their spiritual leader that a stranger would come and cut down their sacred tree and wrest their dominion from them: “If he comes not in your time, assuredly he will come in the time of your children, and will conquer all in this country” (Palmer 1928: III: 98). Indeed, a man named Bagauda arrived soon after, conquered, and became the first king of Kano according to the chronicle (Palmer 1928: III: 97–100).

== Authorship ==
The existing Kano Chronicle was probably written in the 1880s by Malam Barka, a Dan Rimi (high-ranking slave official) who got most of the pages from a son of the late emir [ibrahim dabo] who's name was Zubairu autan dabo. Malam barka was a high ranking slave who worked for Muhammad Bello, the Sarkin Kano (ruler of Kano) who reigned as emir from 1882 to 1893.

The chronicle may represent the amalgamation of earlier works. The original copy is still with the descendants of Malam Idris al-Khilawiy in Kano.

== Translations ==
The best-known translation is Sir Richmond Palmer's 1908 English translation, which was derived from a manuscript obtained at Sabon Gari near Katsina, northern Nigeria.

There is also a 1933 translation into Hausa by Rupert M. East, titled Labarun Hausawa da Makwabtansu: Littafi na biyu. Since this translation made use of a different source than Palmer's translation, East's text has some differences from Palmer's text.

== Rulers listed ==
Rulers of Kano listed in the Kano Chronicle and their years of reign:

1. Bagauda (999-1063)
2. Warisi (1063-1095)
3. Gijimasu (1095-1134)
4. Nawata and Gawata (1134-1136)
5. Yusa (Tsaraki) (1136-1194)
6. Naguji (1194-1247)
7. Gugua (1247-1290)
8. Shekkarau I (1290-1307)
9. Tsamiya (1307-1343)
10. Osumanu Zamnagawa (1343-1349)
11. Yaji I (1349-1385)
12. Bugaya (1385-1390)
13. Kanajeji (1390-1410)
14. Umaru (1410-1421)
15. Dauda (1421-1438)
16. Abdullahi Burja (1438-1452)
17. Dakauta (1452)
18. Atuma (1452)
19. Yakubu (1452-1463)
20. Muhammad Rimfa (1463-1499)
21. Abdullahi (1499-1509)
22. Muhammad Kisoki (1509-1565)
23. Yakufu (1565)
24. Dauda Abasama I (1565)
25. Abubakr Kado (1565-1573)
26. Muhammad Shashere (1573-1582)
27. Muhammad Zaki (1582-1618)
28. Muhammad Nazaki (1618-1623)
29. Kutumbi (1623-1648)
30. Alhaji (1648-1649)
31. Shekkarau II (1649-1651)
32. Muhammad Kukuna (1st reign) (1651-1652)
33. Soyaki (1652)
34. Muhammad Kukuna (2nd reign) (1652-1660)
35. Bawa (1660-1670)
36. Dadi (1670-1703)
37. Muhammad Sharefa (1703-1731)
38. Kumbari (1731-1743)
39. Alhaji Kabe (1743-1753)
40. Yaji II (1753-1768)
41. Babba Zaki (1768-1776)
42. Dauda Abasama II (1776-1781)
43. Muhammad Alwali (1781-1807)
44. Sulimanu (Suleiman) (1807-1819)
45. Ibrahim Dabo (1819-1846)
46. Osumanu (Usman I) (1846-1855)
47. Abdullahi (1855-1883)
48. Muhammad Bello (1883-1892)

== Related manuscripts ==
There are a few 19-century Arabic-language manuscript king-lists from Kano similar to the full-length Kano Chronicle, which are:

- MS Falke 0704 (Umar Falke Collection in the Melville J. Herskovits Library of Africana, Northwestern University; ends with the reign of Muhammad Alwali, 1781–1807)
- MS Jos 47 (University of Ibadan, and from the collection of Sir Richmond Palmer; ends with the reign of Ibrahim Dabo, 1819–1846)
- MS Jos 53 (University of Ibadan, and from the collection of Sir Richmond Palmer; ends with the reign of Usman, 1846–1855)
- MS Paden 399 (Paden Collection of the Melville J. Herskovits Library of Africana, Northwestern University; ends with the reign of Muhammad Tukur, 1893–1895)

== See also ==
- Amina Sukhera
- List of rulers of Kano
- Kingdom of Kano
- Sultanate of Kano
- Song of Bagauda
