= Gijimasu =

- Sarkin Kano
- Reign: 1095-1134
- Predecessor: Warisi
- Successor: Nawata and Gawata
- House: Bagauda Dynasty
- Father: Warisi
- Mother: Yanas

Gijimasu was the King of Kano from 1095 to 1134. He was the son of Warisi and Yanas.

== Succession ==
Gijimasu was succeeded by his twin sons Nawata and Gawata.

== Biography in the Kano Chronicle ==
Below is a biography of Gijimasu from Palmer's 1908 English translation of the Kano Chronicle.

Gijimasu son of Warisi was the 3rd Sarki. His mother’s name was Yanas.

When he came to power he left Sheme and went to Gazarzawa. Some, however, say that it was his son Tsaraki wrho came to this place and built a city. The latter is the better version. It was here he ruled.

Mazuda said, “This Sarki has come here in order to destroy our god and our grove of sacrifice.” The people said, “He has not power to destroy our god, in our time at least.”

So Gijimasu and his people built a house in Gazarzawa. He beguiled the elders with gifts, till by his gifts he obtained dominion over them. They said, “What a good man this is! How well he treats us!”

Mazuda said, “I want to give my daughter to his son in marriage.”

But Bugazau prevented him carrying out his plan. The Sarki consulted the people about building a city. The people agreed: “Come,” they said, “let us build, for we have the power and the strength.” So they began to build the city. They began the wall from Raria. The Sarki slaughtered 100 cattle on the first day of the work.

They continued the work to the gate of Bazugar, and from there to the water gate and on to the gate of Adama, and the gate of Gudan: then past the gates of Waika, Kansakali, and Kawungari as far as the gate of Tuji. There were 8 gates. Sarkin Rano built a city called Zamnagaba. He began building from Rímin Kira, and carried the wall through Wawan Toro, Tafasa, Kusarua, and Kadába to the gate of Bai.

He ruled all the country as far as the lands of Sarkin Gano, Sarkin Dab, Sarkin Debbi, Sarkin Ringim, and Dan Baḳonyaki. Santolo alone stood out against him, for its people were many and pagans. No one was able to rule over them. The Sarkis of Gano, Dab, and Debbi came to Hausaland 9 years before Bagoda. But Buram, Isa, Baba, Kududufi, Akassan, and others of the Kano chiefs, men of the princely clan, came with Bagoda.

Gijimasu ruled 40 years—then he died.

— Kano Chronicle

Preceded by Warisi	Sarkin Kano; 1095-1134	Succeeded by Nawata and Gawata
