= El Kutumbi =

- Sarkin Kano
- Reign: 1623–1648
- Predecessor: Muhammad Nazaki
- Successor: Al Haji
- Born: Muhammad
- House: Bagauda (Kutumbawa)
- Father: Muhammad Nazaki
- Mother: Dada
- Religion: Islam

Muhammad Dan Nazaki (1623–1648), known as El Kutumbi or Muhammad Alwali I was the twenty-ninth ruler of Kano and the patriarch of the eponymous Kutumbawa, the last faction of Hausa aristocrats in Kano. Like the Gaudawa and Rumfawa line of rulers, his house is not primarily differentiated based on lineage but rather significant political and social reforms ushered during their era. While the Rumfawa preferred a more centralized system of government, the reign of Kutumbi and his descendants saw the devolution of power through various new government offices. They also imposed new forms of taxation, most notably on the cattle of the Fula. El Kutumbi's reign was also characterized by successful conquests against Gombe, Bauchi and Kano's principal rival, Katsina. He died of battle wounds after a second expedition against the latter. The Kano Chronicle described him as one of Kano's greatest kings.

== Birth ==
He was the son of Sultan Muhammad Nazaki and his consort, Dada. He succeeded his father as Sultan in 1623.

== Reign as Sultan ==
"Kutumbi was a very mighty Sarki in Hausaland."

El Kutumbi was said to have exuded great power and wealth. His procession was accompanied by a hundred eunuchs dressed in expensive robes and covered in ornaments of gold and silver. He was also followed by fifty kettle-drums, forty drums and twenty-five trumpets. During conquests or festivals, he always had a hundred spare horses. He built two residences in Gandu and Tokarawa. His residence at Tokarawa was used as a transit where he waited for his army to assemble. His army was renowned for their bravery.

=== An unstable administration ===
After his ascension, the most immediate threat to his throne was his father's loyal henchman, Wambai Giwa. The Wambai's wealth, generosity and reputation as the scourge of Katsina had aroused fears that he would revolt against the Sultan. He was promptly stripped of his title by Alwali.

Alwali was said to have had a friend called Kalina Atuman whom he made a vizier and entrusted a liberal amount of power. This Vizier gained power that rivaled even that of the Sultan, so much so that people came to believe that their roles were reversed. Atuman, however, died twelve years into Alwali's reign. After his death, Dawaki Kwoshi assumed similar levels of authority and tried to revolt. The Sultan then seized the stewardship of Kofan Kabugga from the Dawaki's wealthy father, Turaki Kuka Allandayi. Dawaki Kwoshi withdrew from the city and garnered the support of powerful government officials but was cajoled by the Sultan into submission.

Kutumbi's son, Bako, whose exploits in Katsina earned him the title "Jarumi" (Warrior) also assumed much power. With six hundred horses and a heavy cavalry of ninety mailed horsemen, he had a formidable force under is command. The Kano Chronicle states that no prince compared to him "in doing good, or doing ill, in courage, anger, and generosity, he was like a Sarki even while he was only a prince". His ascension to the throne in the case of his father's death was feared by his rivals who prayed for the Jarumi's death. Other accounts state that, foreseeing a civil war after his father's death, Bako himself prayed to die to avoid it. Nevertheless, he died before his father.

=== Other Cabinet members ===
Alwali introduced the titles of "Barde Kerreriya", and that of "Sarkin Shanu"; who was in charge of the state's cattle. He first gave the latter title to his slave, Ibo, later known as Ibo na Kutumbi. He also created the title of "Sarkin Samari", the leader of the Sultan's younger slaves, a title he gave to a man called Mandawali. Subsequently, he created the titles of "Sarkin Dogarai" (Leader of the Royal Guard), and Sarkin Shamaki, and appointed a new "Sarkin Sirdi" (in charge of horse saddles).

=== Taxation ===
Alwali was the first Sultan to impose taxation of Fula herders. He invented a new government tax known as "Jangali", which entitled the State to hundreds of cows.

== Wars and conquests ==
=== Bauchi ===
Alwali's Sarkin Dawaki, Magara, went to war against Bauchi and was victorious. On his way back from Bauchi, he created a new settlement at Ganjua, and sent the Sultan two thousand slaves. The Sultan took offense to Magara's new colony and went to attack the Sarkin Dawaki a year later where he forced him to pay a tax and left five hundred of his slaves there.

=== Gombe ===
Alwali was said to have defeated and sacked the city of Gombe two years after his first expedition in Bauchi.

=== Katsina ===
"Alwali shutter of the great gate, Kimbirmi, shutter of the great gate"

Kano's sister state, Katsina, had been its principal foe in the region. Kano gained the upper hand when it took the strategically located Karaye under Alwali's father's reign and the Wambai Giwa was able to enjoy great successes against them. Alwali's first war with Katsina was in the form of a siege. He camped at Dugazawa where he prevented entry and exit from the State and collected much booty from them. The prince of Kano, Jarumi Bako, also defeated Turmin Dan Ranko, a city in Katsina, earning much spoil.

Alwali's second battle with Katsina was, however, much less fruitful. He camped towards the western part of the gate but the army of Katsina launched a surprise attack that sent the men of Kano into flight. In this retreat, a Katsina warrior, Kumaza, attacked Alwali with a spear but was killed by Dan Maji Zartaki before he could finish the job. Kano's army took flight with Katsina in hot pursuit until they reached Yashi.

== Death and succession ==
El Kutumbi died of the battle wounds sustained in Katsina three days later. While some accounts say he died in Katsina, the better version is that he died in Kano. Muhammad Alwali I was the last Kano Sultan to die in battle until Muhammad Alwali II during the Fula Jihad.

El Kutumbi was succeeded by his son Al Haji who was quickly deposed. His grandson and Al Haji's son, Shekarau, was then elected Sultan, under whose reign Kano and Katsina would sign a lasting peace treaty brokered by Islamic scholars.
