= Dalla Hill =

Ancient hill in Kano Nigeria

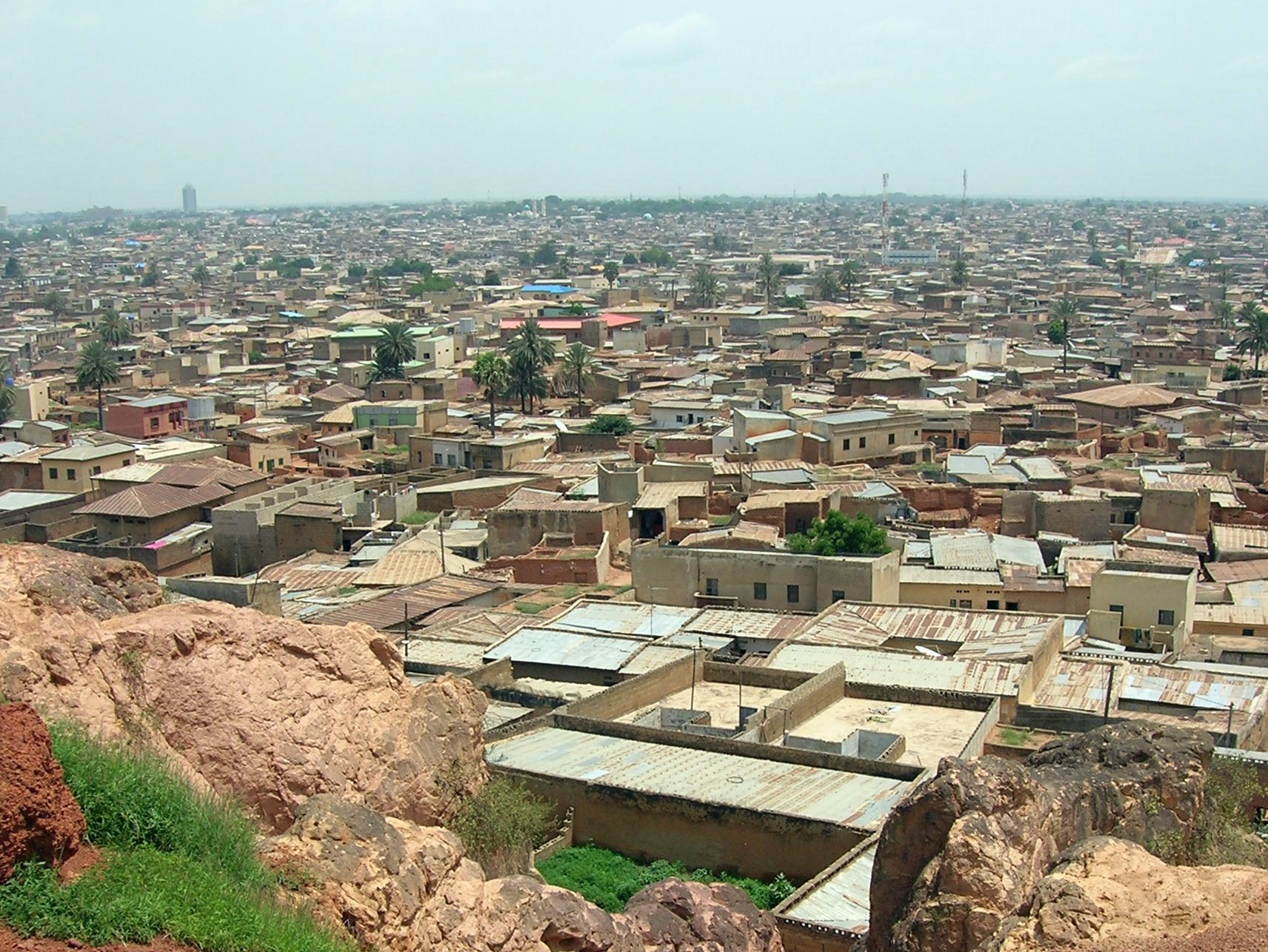
Kano, as seen from Dala Hill, in 2005

Dalla Hill (also spelled Dala) is a hill in Kano, Kano State, Nigeria. It is 534 metres (1,753 ft) high and contains a stairway with 101 steps to the bottom to top.

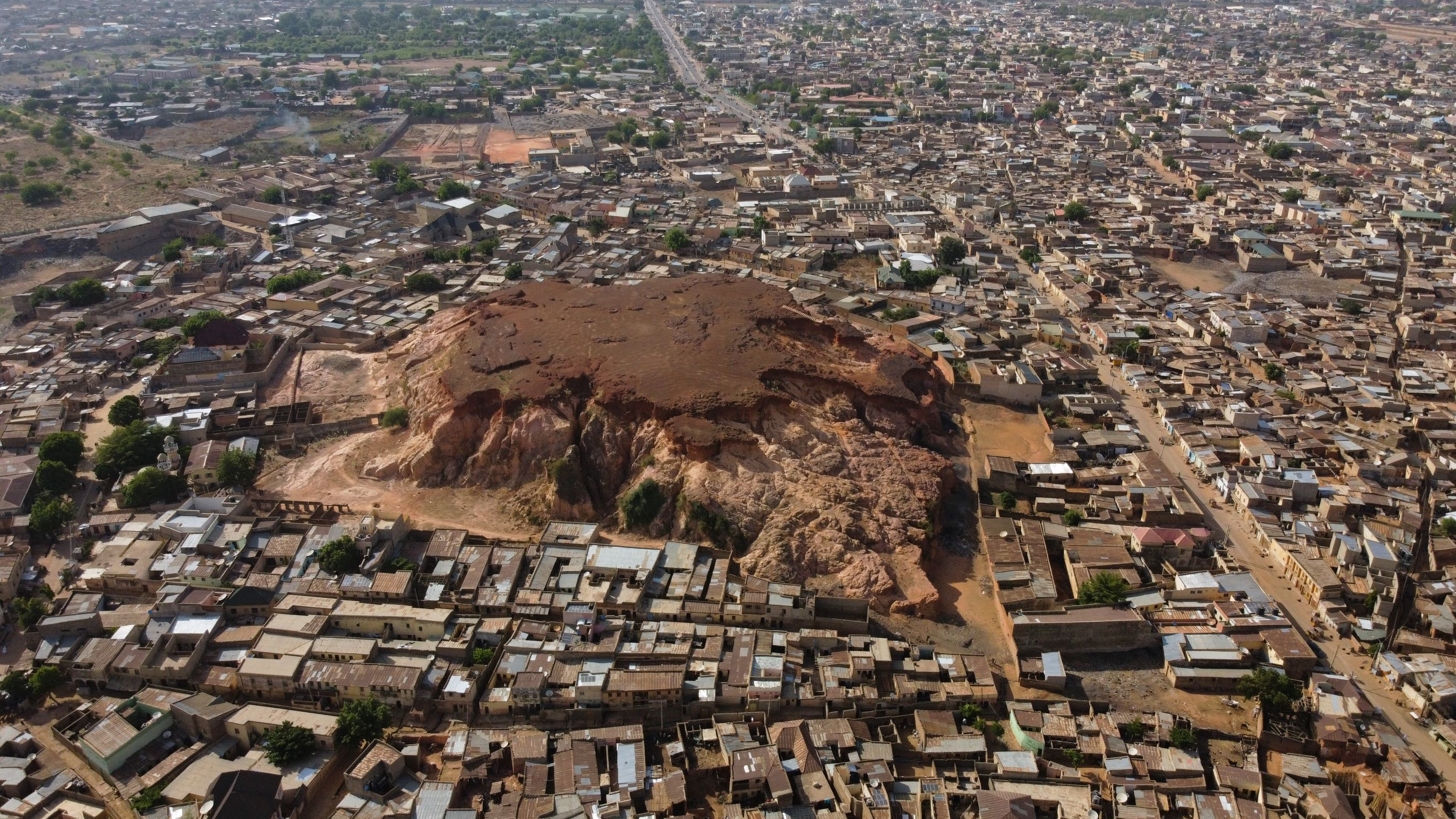
Dala Hill the Cradle of Kano State Nigeria

In the seventh century, the hill was the site of a community that engaged in iron-working. It was called the Tsumburbura shrine from 700 CE up until the credo's collapse as a result of Islamic dominance later in the 13th century. Kano was originally known as Dala, after the hill.

== History ==
The hill is a crucial part of the history of the city of Kano. It is believed that Barbushe, a man of great stature and might who hunted elephants with his stick and carried them on his back to the hill, resided there hundreds of years ago. It said that there, Barbushe built a shrine to worship a deity called Tsumburbura who is believed to have been worshipped by the Hausa people at the time before the arrival of Islam. The only person that was allowed access to the shrine was Barbushe; anyone that entered it without his permission is said to have died tragically. Barbushe never descended from Dalla except on the two days of Idi. When the days drew near, the people that lived in the vicinity of the hill came from all over with animals to sacrifice with the hopes of gaining favor with Tsumburbura.

This also has ties to the Bayajidda legend in Hausa folklore which is an account of a stranger believed to have been from Baghdad, who arrived in the future Hausaland, married into an existing ruling family, and fathered the rulers of the seven city-states which were to make up that elastic, but successful confederation known as the Hausa Bakwai. Despite the hill being a symbol of paganism and idol worship, it still kept its significance after the arrival of Islam. The power of the sacred hill was so fixed in early Hausa tradition that as late as 1819, the second Fulani Muslim ruler used to the hill as a spiritual summit where he would combine his prayers of forty days and perform them at the top of the hill, thus gathering assurance of victory in war. The old "pagan" center energized prayers sent up to Allah. Dalla hill was the center of power around which all rituals revolved. There, the ancestor figure, leader of the race, first lived. There, he had his wives and seven children. It was there that the first event took place, and it was to Dalla that the descendants must return again and again.
