= Kingdom of Kano =

Hausa kingdom

Kingdom of Kano Masarautar Kano (Hausa)
- c. 999–1807
- Capital: Kano
- Common languages: Major: Hausa; Minor: Fulfulde, Kanuri, Tamasheq, Arabic
- Religion: Hausa animism; Sunni Islam
- Demonym: Bakane (pl. Kanawa)
- Government: Sarauta
- Sarki
  - c. 999: Bagauda (first)
  - 1463–1499: Muhammadu Rumfa
  - 1623–1648: Muhammadu el-Kutumbi
  - 1781–1807: Muhammadu Alwali II (last)
- Legislature: Taran Kano
- History
  - Arrival of Daura immigrants: c. 999
  - Construction of city walls begun: c. 1095
  - Arrival of Wangarawa and introduction of Islam: c. 1349
  - Battle of Santolo: c. 1380
  - Bornu suzerainty and opening of trade routes: c. 1438
  - Jihad of Usman dan Fodio: 1807
- Currency: Cowries, gold
Succeeded by
Kano Emirate
- Today part of: Nigeria; Kano State; Jigawa State

The Kingdom of Kano was a Hausa kingdom centred on the city of Kano in modern-day northern Nigeria that was established around 1000 CE, and endured until its conquest during the jihad of Usman dan Fodio in 1805. Following this, its dynasty was replaced with a Fulani one subordinate to the Sokoto Caliphate, and the polity continues to exist today as the Kano Emirate Council, a non-sovereign monarchy in Nigeria.

== Physical geography ==
Kano lies to the north of the Jos Plateau, located in the Sudanian Savanna region that stretches across the south of the Sahel. The city lies near where the Kano and Challawa rivers flowing from the southwest converge to form the Hadejia River, which eventually flows into Lake Chad to the east. Traditionally, agriculture was based on lifting water to irrigate small parcels of land along river channels in the dry season, known as the Shadouf system. At the time when the kingdom was flourishing, tree cover would have been more extensive and the soil less degraded than it is today.

== History ==
=== Background ===
Our knowledge of the early history of Kano comes largely from the Kano Chronicle, a compilation of oral traditions and some other documents composed as early as the late 19th century, as well as more recently conducted archaeology. Another valuable ancient source is the long folk poem Song of Bagauda, which is commonly sung by beggars in Kano city and is believed to date from the reign of Bagauda in the 11th century. Other important written works recording local traditions include two 20th century works: Ta'rikh Kano by Ghadames Arab scholar Adamu na Ma'aji, and Kano ta Dabo Cigari by Alhaji Abubakar, Dokaji of Kano.

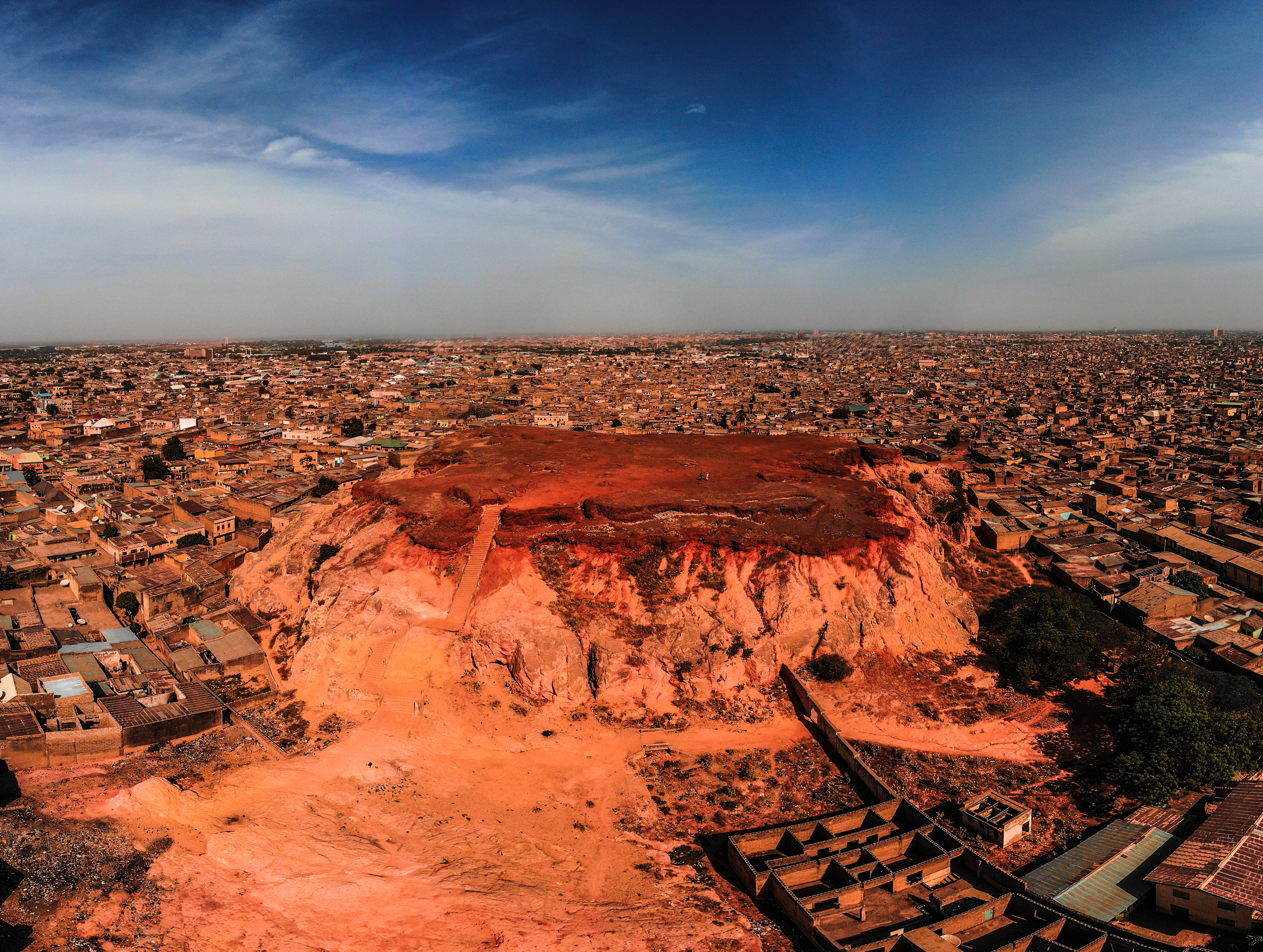
Aerial view of Dalla hill

In the 7th century, Dala Hill was the site of a community that engaged in iron-working. It is unknown whether these were Hausa people or speakers of Niger–Congo languages. Some sources say they were Hausa-speaking hunter-gatherers known as Abagayawa who migrated from Gaya. There are still blacksmiths in Kano today who call themselves Abagayawa and claim descent from the early inhabitants of Kano. The Abagayawa also practiced the arts of medicine, beer-brewing, archery, drumming, minstresly and dancing. The 20th century Kano scholar Adamu na Ma'aji identifies them as Warjawa.

The Arab geographer al-Yaqubi, writing in 872/873 CE (AH 259), describes a kingdom called "HBShH" with a city named "ThBYR" ruled by a king called "MRH" (none of these words are vocalized, so their actual pronunciation can vary), located between the Niger Bend and the Kingdom of Kanem. If the kingdom's name is vocalised as "Habasha" it would correspond with other Arabic language texts that also appear to refer to the Hausa, and would be the earliest reference to the Hausa region.

Kano was originally known as Dala, after the hill, and was referred to as such as late as the end of the 15th century and the beginning of the 16th century by Bornoan sources. The hill was named after a man who built a house on it. He lived there with his wives and children. His oldest son, Garageje, was the great-grandfather of Barbushe, the most well-known pagan high priest of Dala. Barbushe was a great hunter who "slew elephants with his stick and carried them on his head about nine miles." He was the chief priest of Tsumburbura, the then deity of Kano. Elizabeth Isichei notes that the description of Barbushe is similar to those of Sao people. Dala was said to have had six generations of rulers before the 11th century. Other notable chiefdoms in the area at the time included Sheme and Santolo.

=== Gaudawa (c. 999–1452) ===
==== Arrival of Daura immigrants and the founding of the Kingdom of Kano ====
Around the late 10th-century, several immigrant groups arrived in the Dala area; one of them, from Daura, was led by a man named Bagauda. He was said to be a descendant of Bayajidda of Daura, the legendary hero-founder of the Hausa people. At the time, the animist Hausa-speaking peoples that populated the area were organised in sizeable clans, each settled in a particular locality under a clan-head or 'priest-chief'. Their common cult was presided over by members of a patrilineage settled within the present city walls around the Dala hill and Jakara pond, which at the time was a sacred kurmi (or thickly wooded grove). Barbushe, as chief priest of Tsumburbura, wielded ritual authority over this group. Beyond this community were several others, presumably of similar character and organisation.

Before Bagauda's arrival, a number of other groups from Daura had settled at Gano and Debi in southeastern area in modern Kano. Later came "men of princely clans", according to the Chronicle, accompanying Bagauda. Those named were Buram, Isa, Baba, Kududdufi, and Akasa. Their names were preserved as princely titles, namely: Dan Buram, Dan Isa, Dan Baba, Dan Akasa, Dan Kududdufi, and others like Dan Darman, and Dan Goriba. By the reign of the last Hausa ruler of Kano Alwali II in the late 18th century, most of these titles had lost their princely rank and/or function. It is not known for certain what religion Bagauda arrived with, though indications in the Chronicle suggest some relationship to Islam. It is possible that this could simply reflect its anonymous author's bias.

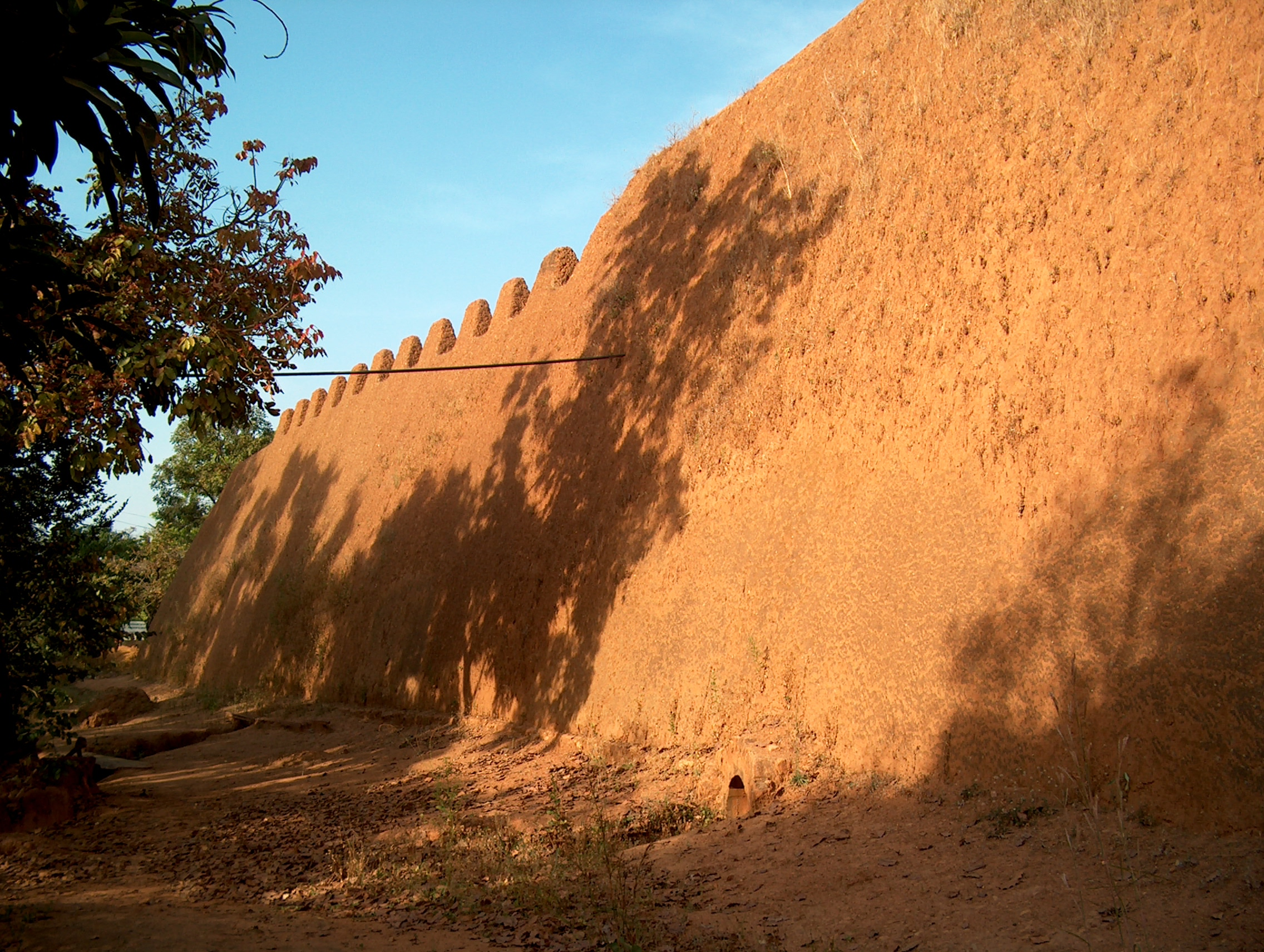
A section of the ancient city walls of Kano

According to another tradition recorded by the Song of Bagauda, Bagauda's community rapidly expanded due to "a killing famine" driving strangers to join. The nearby Jakara marsh may have likely provided the community with reliable harvests during times of irregular rainfall. This prosperity drew envy from their neighbours which led to the establishment of a local chiefship to organise effective defence. The Song of Bagauda reads:

The people were living widely dispersed over the open country, not subject to any authority.
There was no chief, no protecting town wall.
Tunbi together with Washam saw an easy prey.
And they joined forces conquering the people of Kano.
The elders said: Let a chieftaincy be established.
They appointed Bagauda, the protector.

— Song of Bagauda

Bagauda thus became the first Sarkin Kano (chief/ruler of Kano). According to the Chronicle, he died at Sheme, about 65 km northwest of Kano city (near Kunchi), and was succeeded by his son Warisi (1063–1095), who also died there. The historian and social anthropologist M G Smith notes that the two traditions "may be mutually consistent" rather than competing versions, and adds that neither Bagauda nor Barbushe may represent actual historical individuals.

Warisi's successor Gijimasu (1095–1134), the third sarki, founded a settlement at the foot of Dala Hill which would become Kano city. He is credited with starting the construction of the city's defensive walls, later completed by his successors. The pagan peoples already living in the area refused intermarriage with the newcomers and excluded them from their rituals, effectively segregating the town into two communities. Despite this, Gijimasu further extended his influence or domain by political and military pressure. He seemed to have imposed his rule on other communities of Daura immigrants covering an area of about 24 to 40 km south and east of Kano city. The sarki also laid claim to nearby Ringim, whose chief does not seem to be a Daura immigrant. However, Gijimasu's expansionist campaign suffered a major setback with his failed attack on the large indigenous pagan stronghold of Santolo, located 16 km southeast of Kano, near present-day Tsakuwa.

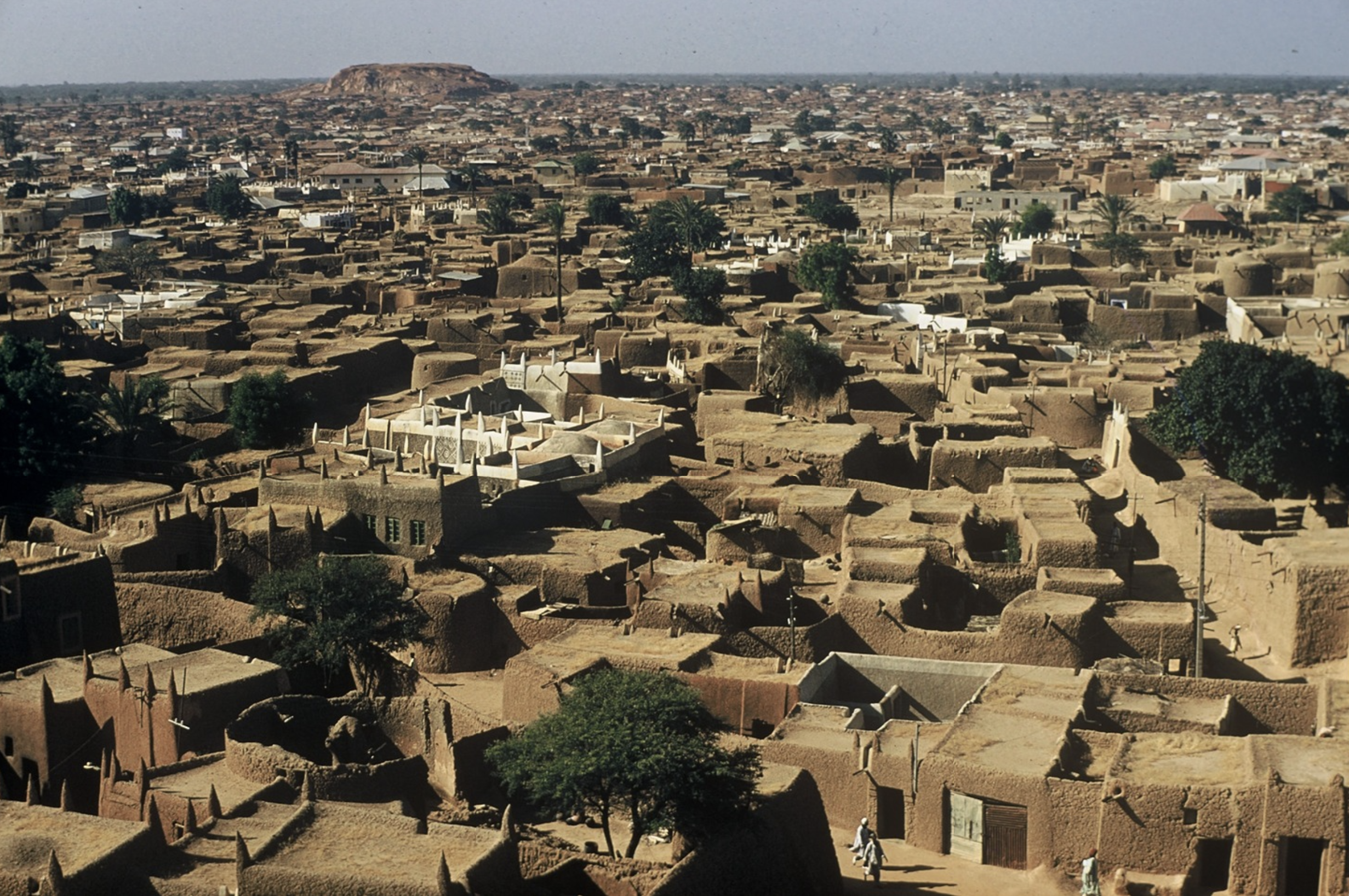
Aerial view of Kano city with the Dala Hill visible in the distance, 1959

Gijimasu died in 1134 and, according to the Chronicle, was succeeded by his twin sons Nawata and Gawata who jointly ruled. Yusa (1136–1194), their successor and also Gijimasu's son, also pursued aggressive expansion, this time westward. He attacked the chief of Karaye, and subjugated the area from Gwarmai (40km south of Kano) past Badari to Farin Ruwa in the northwest, near the Katsina Kingdom. Yusa's successor Naguji (1194–1247), having already subjugated the area from Kura (16 km south of Kano) to Tsangaya (64 km southeast), beyond the boundaries of the Dutse and Gaya chiefdoms, turned his attention to Santolo, which again defeated the Kano chief, remaining the only native stronghold in this area that still withstood him. According to the Chronicle:

[Sarkin Kano Naguji] camped at Basaima two years for the purpose of attacking Santolo, but he was worsted in the war and returned to Kano. He found the pagans there on the verge of revolt; so he cajoled them with talk and executed their leader... When he was dead the rest of the people said, "we are willing to follow you, O Sarki, because we must." The Sarki said... "If you are willing to follow me, show me the secrets of this god of yours." They replied, "We will not show you the secrets of our god." So the Sarki punished them. Naguji was the first Sarki who collected a land tax of one-eighth of the crop from all husbandmen.

Naguji was succeeded by Guguwa (1247–1290) who also sought to destroy the centres of native opposition to Kano rule. Acting on the advice of his senior councillors, Guguwa attacked the pagan cult centre but failed. According to the Chronicle, the sarki was soon struck blind on the night of the Idi festival by an apparition, a manifestation of their god, "a man with a red snake in his hand." Whether or not Guguwa was indeed blinded is not clear, but he was deposed as sarki and replaced with Shekarau (1290–1307). Like his predecessor, the new sarki was similarly pressed by his courtiers to subdue the natives with force. The pagan natives, however, diverted this threat through diplomatic means, appealing to Shekarau "If the domains of a ruler are wide, he should be patient; if they are not so, he will not obtain possession of the whole country by impatience." To which he replied "your talk is true," and left them their customs and power.

Yet their struggle for religious and political autonomy against the growing power of the immigrants continued. The pagan leader, Samagi, which may have been a title rather than a name, emphasised the utmost importance of maintaining secrecy of their cult ritual and the secular consequences of revelation, declaring "If we show [the sarki] the secrets of our god, we shall lose all our power, and we and our generation will be forgotten." Their ancient cult was thus driven underground, its mystery and secrecy was seen by the Kano chiefs as a constant threat to their rule.

The tenth Sarkin Kano was Tsamiya (1307–1343), who succeeded Shekarau. When the pagan natives sent him tribute of 200 slaves to permit the maintenance of their cult, Tsamiya rejected it, and instead attacked their centre. By this time the pagan deity and cult had changed its identity from Tsumburbura to Cibiri (or Tchibiri). The sarki successfully destroyed the sanctuary dedicated to Cibiri and all within it. Following his triumph, three of the pagans explained to him the cult ritual and, in return, he gave them new titles as Sarkin Cibiri, Sarkin Gazarzawa, and Sarkin Kurmi and placed them to lead over their respective communities. Each of these names recalled centres of strongest resistance to Hausa authority: Tchibiri, the cultic deity; Gazarzawa, the centre of strongest pagan resistance; and Kurmi, the ancient sacred grove Jakara. In this way, argued M G Smith, Tsamiya replaced the newly broken ritual unity of the city pagans, and divided them under three leaders of equal status who all owed their positions to him, thereby consolidating his control.

Tsamiya met a violent death at the hands of one Usumanu Zamnagawa, whose origins remain unclear. His nickname, Zamnagawa, derives from his seclusion at the palace with the corpse (gawa) of the murdered sarki. His real name Usumanu suggests he was a Muslim, the first Muslim name in the kingslist. This obscure ancestry and the violent character of his accession may indicate a conquest by Muslims, possibly Malinke. Zamnagawa reigned from 1343 to 1349, around the time when Muhammadu Korau, another Muslim, usurped the throne in Katsina. Korau was also probably of Mandinka descent and subject to Mali, since his immediate successor, Ibrahim Sura, had a Muslim name and a Mandinka title. On this basis, M G Smith suggests that Zamnagawa's reign may represent a brief subjugation of Kano by Mandinka forces of the Mali empire.

Following Tsamiya's victory over the pagan natives, their subsequent responses to the immigrant chiefship fell into three patterns: some, like the Maguzawa, withdrew to the rocky areas in the outskirts at Fankui; a larger group known as the Rumuwa asked the sarki for someone to administer their affairs, which Zamnagawa gave to his son as their chief; the third response was defiance, represented by the last native stronghold of Santolo. By Zamnagawa's reign, the natives of Kano appear to have been more or less divided and subdued. The Kano Kingdom (masarautar Kano) already extended east and south to the boundaries of Gaya, Dutse, and Rano, and westwards from Gwarmai to Farin Ruwa and Sheme.

==== Introduction of Islam and Wangara influence ====
Ali Yaji was Zamnagawa's successor and Tsamiya's son. Early in his reign, Yaji drove out the king of Rano (also a Daura immigrant) out of his walled capital at Zamnagaba, and pushed the pagan Ajawa, Warjawa and Arawa further southwards. The Chronicle relates that it was during his reign that Wangarawa scholars and traders came to Kano from the Mali Empire, introducing Islam to Hausaland. Yaji became Muslim and appointed several of these Mandinka to offices of state as imam, ladan, and alkali (judge). He then called on his subjects to also accept Islam and to observe the obligatory prayers. When the Sarkin Gazarzawa (one of the three pagan chiefships created following Tsamiya's triumph over the Cibiri cult) objected, tradition relates that he and his people "were struck blind by Allah". To mock the Sarkin Gazarzawa, Yaji reappointed him as Sarkin Makafi, or chief of the blind, a title believed to still be held by his descendants.

The ancient struggle between the pagan natives and the Daura immigrants again flared up. Encouraged by the miraculous blinding of the Kano pagans and reinforced by Mandinka support, Yaji attacked the last pagan stronghold of Santolo and destroyed its cult centre. The removed cult objects included a battleaxe, "leg irons", a bell and two horns. Yaji then ordered all its inhabitants killed except women and little children. In large part, Yaji's success at Santolo owed much to the superior military techniques of his Muslim Mandinka warriors. In appreciation, the sarki rewarded with offices those among them whose efforts were most impactful: Goji received the important office of Madawaki, Kosa was appointed Dawaki, and Gurgu received Dan Maje. This effectively marked the end to the resistance of the Kano natives to Daura immigrant rule. The Chronicle characterises these conflicts as between the Muslim ruling class and commoners following the Hausa traditional religions, however, historian Mahdi Amadu considers this a later re-interpretation. He argues that the struggles were instead a result of commoners rebelling against "increasingly despotic rule" as the Kano sarauta (ruling class) furthered the process of centralisation.

Following his victory at Santolo, Yaji, again relying on Mandinka support, attacked the Warjawa (Warji) and conquered the smaller settlements from Bere to Panda, after which he campaigned for months along the River Benue, raiding the Jukun of Kwararafa for the first time. Seeking refuge, the Jukun fled to a hilltop at Attagara but were forced down by the threat of starvation. They made peace with Sarkin Kano Yaji by giving him a hundred slaves; however, the Chronicle suggests they may have killed him. Yaji was succeeded by Bugaya whose most notable act was dispersing the Maguzawa natives at Fankui, thereby preventing growth of a centre for tribal resistance. By this time, Kano's state apparatus had taken shape with the successive creations of ethnic and local chiefships supervised by an increasingly segregated officialdom of which the Galadima, Madawaki, Dan Buram, Dawaki, and Dan Maje were the senior administrators and councillors, along with the new Mandinka Alkali and Limam.

Depiction of a Kano cavalryman in lifidi armour, 1924

Yaji's son Kanajeji (1390–1410) succeeded Bugaya as Sarkin Kano. Under him, the kingdom expanded aggressively at the expense of its neigbours seeking tribute and slaves rather than territory. Like his father, Kanajeji first demanded a tribute of 200 slaves from the Jukun as traditional due, then sent horses to them in return for slaves. M G Smith describes the nature of this exchange as "political in base, diplomatic in form, and perhaps commercial in aim." He then turned his attention to the ‘Mbutuwa pagans, who had settled in southern Kano, where rocky terrain provided effective defence against the Kano cavalry. Kanajeji is credited with several martial innovations including the use of lifidi (cotteon-padded armour), iron helmets, and coats of chain mail (sulke). The heavy losses sustained on the Umbatu (’Mbutu) campaign inspired the adoption of this new military gear, probably on the advice of the Mandinka Wangarawa at court. Previously unknown in Kano, such equipment was long familiar to Bornu and Mali.

After suffering further defeats, Kanajeji's army eventually occupied ‘Mbutu farms for two years until they capitulated to avoid starvation, at which point the sarki levied four thousand adults and children as slaves. Encouraged by this victory, he then attacked the Zazzau Kingdom and besieged its capital but was defeated. Frustrated, Kanajeji abandoned his Muslim Mandinka advisers and instead sought counsel from the pagan natives. Their ritual head the Sarkin Cibiri advised him to "re-establish the god that your father and grandfather destroyed." They attributed his defeats at 'Mbutu and Zazzau to his grandfather Tsamiya's desecration of Cibiri and to his acceptance of the foreign religion of the Mandinka. Kanajeji accepted this advise and consequently abandoned Islam, severed his dependence on Mandinka support, and re-established the Cibiri cult, including the revival of Barbushe's ritual.

The following year he invaded Zazzau, killed their sarki, and routed his army. The triumphant Kanajeji then led his army southward raiding and pillaging for eight months and seizing whatever he wished. M G Smith concludes that Kanajeji, rather than territorial expansion, was primarily interested in acquiring slaves "to be traded, sold, given away, put into production or converted into political capital as the chief's slave staff and soldiery."

==== Rise of Bornu influence and establishment of trade networks ====
Sarkin Kano Kanajeji was succeeded by Umaru (1410–1421), "a malam earnest in prayer". Remembered as a deeply devout Muslim, Umaru appears to have had some unease about his role and status as sarki. Tradition relates how on his accession his friend Abubakar, another devout malam, protested that Umaru was deserting religion for the world and its lusts. When Umaru resisted this appeal, Abubakar left Kano for Bornu, returning over a decade later to repeat his warning.This time Umaru accepted it, and resigned as sarki declaring to his council: "This high estate is a trap for the erring; I wash my hands of it." He spent the rest of his life in Bornu with his friend, remorseful for his actions as sarki. His reign was marked by peace and without personal extortion.

Between 1425 and 1432, Uthman Kalnama, a deposed mai (ruler) of Bornu, travelled westwards to Kano "with many men and malams." He came with horses, drums, trumpets, flags and guns. These newly arrived Kanuri scholars initiated the spread of literacy among the Hausa, teaching some of Kano's people (or Kanawa) how to read and write. Evidently the Mandinka scholars had reserved such knowledge for themselves, likely to protect their position. During this period, the Kanem-Bornu Empire experienced decades of intense civil strife between the mais and the rebel Bulala. Even decades after Kalnama's migration, the mais moved their courts restlessly westwards across the northern Bornu plains, finally establishing a permanent capital at Birni Gazargamo under Mai Ali Gaji in the late 15th century. In short, the 15th century saw the Bornu ruling class relocate, reorient their state, and develop new interests in the west. At Kano, Uthman Kalnama is most often remembered by the Hausa term dagaci (or dagachi), denoting the resident head of a rural community which may vary widely in its size or political status. Sarkin Kano Dauda (1421–1438) welcomed him into Kano city and when he went on a five month campaign against Zazzau, he left the government of Kano under the dagaci to administer, who in the sarki's absence "became very wealthy."

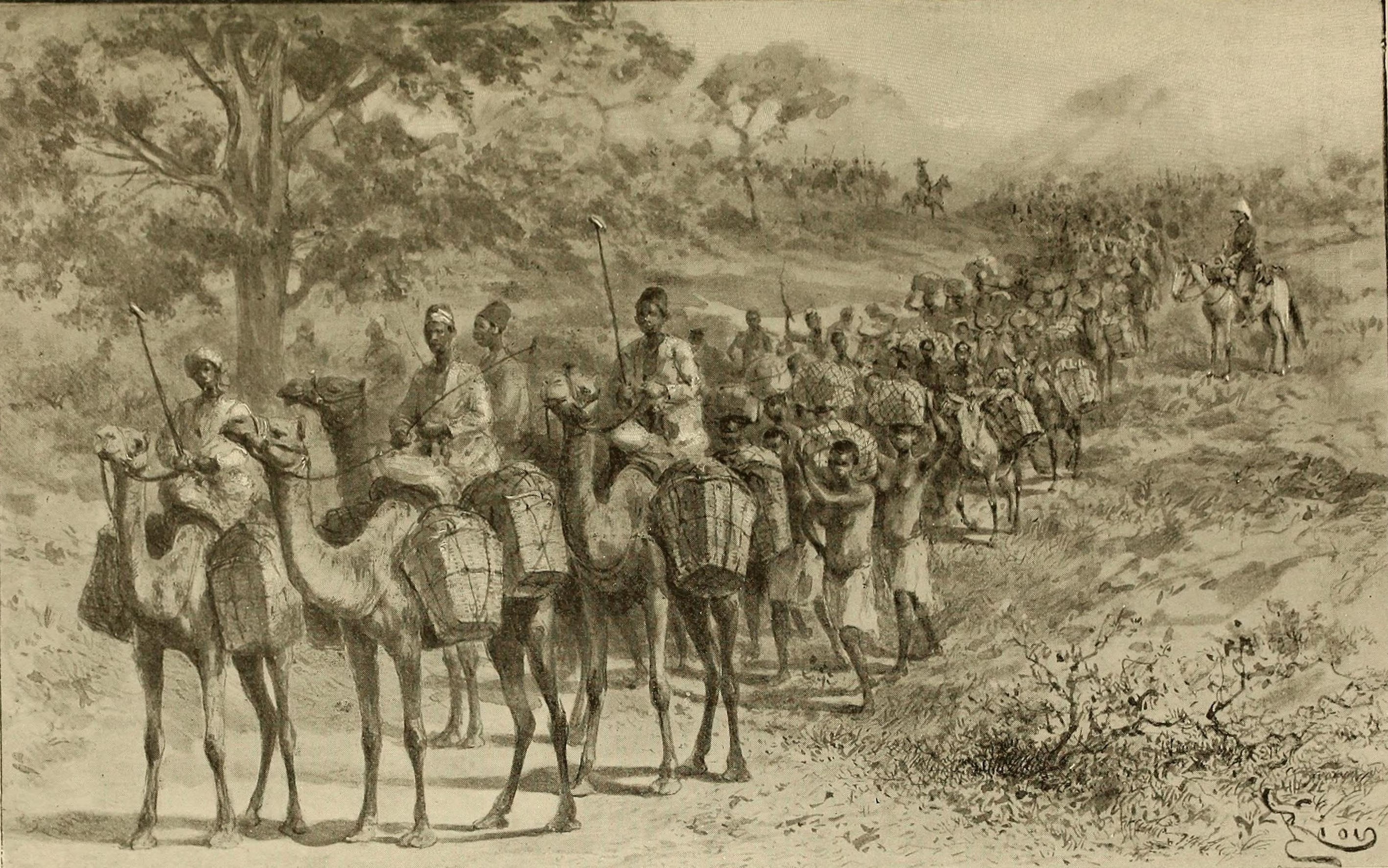
Hausa caravan travelling with loads of kola nuts on camel-back

Under Abdullahi Burja (1438–1452), Dauda's successor, Bornu suzerainty over Kano was formalised. The Chronicle relates how he "was the first in Hausaland to give Bornu tsare (tribute)." His reign also saw the opening of the roads from Bornu to Gwanja (in northern Ghana), which for centuries thereafter became the main source of kola nuts imported to the Hausa states. Through his Kanuri contacts, Burja introduced camels to Kano. Following his submission, Sarkin Kano Burja embarked on a campaign of conquest, raiding southward and marching eastward to extend his control over the nearby chiefdoms of Miga (near Hadejia) and Dutse. Due west lay the powerful independent chiefdom of Gaya, now almost wholly enclosed within Kano's territory. From Dutse, Burja's galadima, Dauda, led the Kano army south to raid the Warjawa and other pagan peoples near modern Bauchi state. Galadima Dauda's seven year raiding campaign was unprecidented "in scale, length, and in its systematic decimation or devastation and wholesale enslavement of primitive tribesmen incapable of defense or escape. Kanejeji's massive toll at ‘Mbutu shrinks in comparison." The Chronicle records that "every month he sent a thousand slaves to Sarkin Kano. All the people of Kano flocked to him. No one was left in Kano except the Sarki and very old men." It continued:

Slaves because very numerous in Kano. The Sarki sent a message for him to come back, so he returned. On his way back he halted every three miles and built a town. At each he left a thousand slaves, 500 males and 500 females. He thus founded 21 towns, before he came to Kano. On his arrival he gave the Sarki three thousand slaves and said to him, "I have founded 21 towns, and in each I have left a thousand slaves, all yours." The Sarki asked him, "What are the names of the towns you have built?" Galadima said, "Their names are Ibdabu (throne slave-estates)." The Sarki said, "I make you ruler of all these towns and of their domains."

This was the last major slave-raiding campaign in Kano history, as caravan trade and local industry proved even more lucrative than slaving. Many of Dauda's captives remained in Kano as throne slaves, settled in separate communities (rumada) along the road southwest from the city. While Burja was away campaigning at Dutse, dagaci, Uthman Kalnama (or his successor), "had assumed great power in the country, and collected wealth without end, and had built houses from his house as far as Salamta." He also established a new market at Karabka, the first recorded market in Hausaland. Coming from Bornu, where markets "were ancient and indispensable", the Bornu prince likely introduced this institution to manage Kano's increasing long-distance trade.

=== Apogee ===
The 15th century saw the expansion of trade in the region, as a road from Bornu to Gonja in modern-day Ghana was constructed, and Kano exported kola nuts and eunuchs while importing camels and salt. Fulani arrived bringing new scholarly works, and Kano's prosperity attracted many descendants of Muhammad and the influential Muslim cleric al-Maghili as the ruling class Islamised. Despite this prosperity, Abdullahi Burja's reign (1438-52) saw Kano begin paying tribute to Bornu.

The reign of Muhammad Rumfa (1463-99) oversaw various innovations, including further construction on the city walls, the appointment of eunuchs to state offices, the establishment of the Kurmi market in Kano, and that of a council of nine senior office-holders ("the Nine of Kano"). He also constructed a new palace (Gidan Rumfa), established a harem of 1000 wives, and began the official celebration of Eid al-Fitr (the end of Ramadan). Rumfa also oversaw Kano's first war with Katsina which lasted 11 years and ended inconclusively. His successors Abdullahi (1499-1509) and Muhammad Kisoki (1509-65) waged a second war against Katsina, however despite the conquest of Zazzau it too ended inconclusively.

=== Decline and Fall ===
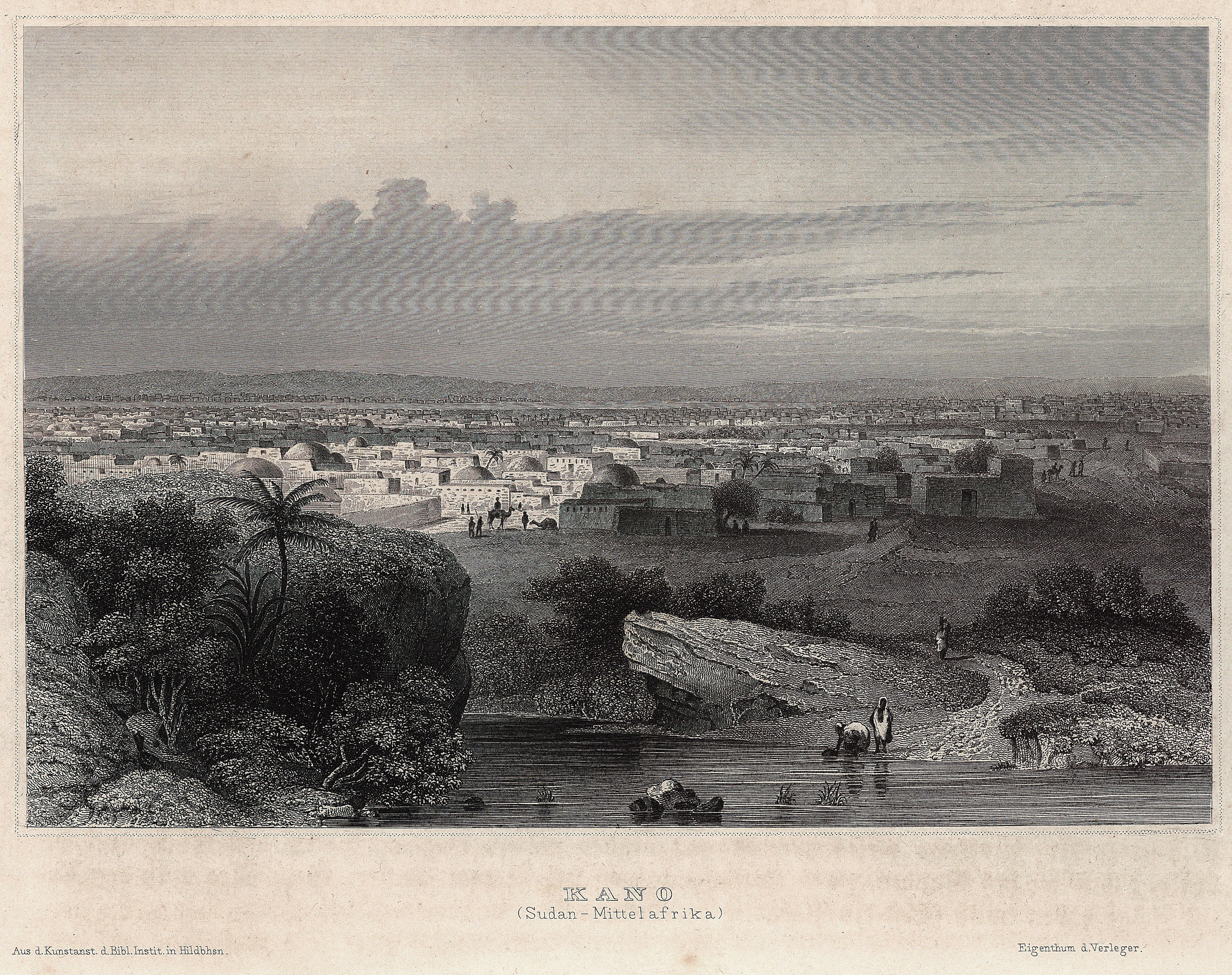
Kano city in the 19th-century

By the 1700s, Fula clans, invigorated by their success in Takrur and the Futa area, were beginning to assert control over much of Sudanic West Africa. In Kano, the most powerful clan, the Jobawa, were relatively pacified by a seat in the council of state, the Taran Kano. Other clans were competing with the sultanate for control. Economic decline had forced the successive sultans to raise taxes to the point that Tuareg clans were abandoning Kano.

Muhammad Sharefa (1703–1731) and his successor, Kumbari dan Sharefa (1731–1743), both engaged the Fula in major battles. During this period Kano was a thriving city with advanced medical knowledge and a diverse economy, although Katsina had overtaken it in preeminence among the Hausa states. Muskets and gunpowder were manufactured locally, and the city of Timbuktu depended on the Sultanate for protection. Babban Zaki (1747–1771) grew the sultanate's cavalry force and his personal bodyguard.

The Fulani under the Sokoto Caliphate finally established control when Muhammadu Bakatsine, leader of the Jobawa Fulani, rebelled against Muhammadu Alwali Ibn Yaji, the last sultan of Kano. He was deposed in 1805 and killed in 1807. Kano then became an emirate subject to Sokoto.

== See also ==
- List of rulers of Kano
- Bagauda Dynasty
- Kano Chronicle
