= Muhammad V of Bornu =

Muhammad V

Mai of the Kanem–Bornu Empire
- Reign: 15th century (3–5 years) c. 1467–1470 (Note: Different king lists (girgams) and chronicles translated in the 19th–20th centuries variously give Muhammad a reign of zero years (Urvoy), three years (Nachtigal, Landeroin), or five years (Barth, Palmer). As a result of this, and due to different calculations for other mais, various dates have been given for his reign, including 1467–1471 (Barth), 1467–1472 (Palmer), 1369–1372 (Landeroin), and 1399–1402 (Nachtigal). The placement of Muhammad V in the sequence of rulers differs considerably from the others in Landeroin and Nachtigal's lists. Cohen (1966) considered a reign of five years to be most likely. Lange (1984) dated Muhammad's reign to 1460–1465, Stewart (1989) dated it to 1467–1472, and Bosworth (2012) dated it to 1467–1472.)
- Predecessor: Umar II
- Successor: Ali I Gaji
- Died: c. 1470; Sahara
- Dynasty: Sayfawa dynasty (Idrisid (Note: The 14th and 15th centuries saw protracted civil wars between the rival Idrisid (descendants of Idris I Nikalemi) and Dawudid (descendants of Dawud Nikalemi) branches of the Sayfawa dynasty.))
- Father: Muhammad

Muhammad V (Note: Some chronologies of Kanem–Bornu rulers omit the 14th-century Muhammad II Manza, lowering the regnal numbers of later rulers of this name. This ruler is then considered Muhammad IV.) (Muḥammad bin Muḥammad) was mai (ruler) of the Kanem–Bornu Empire in the mid-to-late 15th century, ruling approximately 1467–1470. Muhammad ruled during the "Era of Instability", a chaotic period of internal and external conflict in the empire.

== Life ==
Muhammad's father was also named Muhammad but it is not clear which Muhammad is meant in the sources. Cohen (1966) identified Muhammad's father as mai Muhammad IV. Muhammad IV was a Dawudid (descendant of mai Dawud Nikalemi) but the Dawudid branch of the imperial family had been defeated and driven from the empire by the Idrisid (descendant of mai Idris I Nikalemi) prince Ali Gaji some years prior. Lange (1984) instead believed Muhammad V to have been a son of mai Muhammad III, who Lange interpreted as an Idrisid.

Muhammad became mai in the mid-15th century, during a time when Ali Gaji acted as a kingmaker in the empire. Before becoming mai, Muhammad had been engaged in civil conflict against his predecessor, Umar II, and gradually gained the upper hand over the course of about a year. Muhammad probably killed Umar. Muhammad was remembered as a powerful and courageous ruler, and a "warlike monarch", though few details of his reign are recorded.

Muhammad ruled for three or five years and was succeeded as mai by Ali Gaji. The site of Muhammad's death is variously recorded as "Breda", "Bérbéra", or the "country of the Berbers", terms that refer to the Sahara.
