= Uthman IV of Bornu =

Uthman IV

Mai of the Kanem–Bornu Empire
- Reign: 15th century (5–11 years) c. 1461–1466 (Note: Different king lists (girgams) and chronicles translated in the 19th–20th centuries give Uthman different regnal lengths: 5 years (Barth, Palmer), 10 years (Urvoy), or 11 years (Nachtigal, Landeroin). As a result of this, and due to different calculations for other mais, various dates have been given for his reign, including 1461–1466 (Barth, Palmer), 1463–1473 (Urvoy), 1353–1364 (Landeroin), and 1383–1394 (Nachtigal). The placement of Uthman IV in the sequence of rulers differs considerably from the others in Landeroin and Nachtigal's lists. Cohen (1966) considered a reign of 5 years most likely. Lange (1984) dated Uthman's reign to 1454–1459 whereas both Stewart (1989) and Bosworth (2012) used Barth and Palmer's dates, 1461–1466.)
- Predecessor: Gaji
- Successor: Umar II
- Died: c. 1466 "Mikidhá"
- Dynasty: Sayfawa dynasty (Dawudid (Note: The 14th and 15th centuries saw protracted civil wars between the rival Idrisid (descendants of Idris I Nikalemi) and Dawudid (descendants of Dawud Nikalemi) branches of the Sayfawa dynasty.))
- Father: Kade III

Uthman IV (ʿUthmān bin Kade) was mai (ruler) of the Kanem–Bornu Empire in the mid-15th century, ruling approximately 1461–1466. Uthman ruled during the "Era of Instability", a chaotic period of internal and external conflict in the empire. Uthman was the last mai of the Dawudid line of the imperial Sayfawa dynasty, which had been in conflict with the Idrisid line for about a century.

== Life ==
Uthman was a son of mai Kade III. Uthman became mai in the mid-15th century. He succeeded mai Gaji, who had been killed in battle by Muhammad bin Abd al-Jalil, ruler of the Bilala of Kanem. Gaji had in turn succeeded Uthman's brother Muhammad IV a few years prior and his relation to the other Sayfawa rulers is unclear; later chronicles and lists only record the name of Gaji's mother.

Later chronicles record that Uthman had "excellent qualities as prince". Uthman belonged to the Dawudid branch of the imperial family, the descendants of mai Dawud Nikalemi. By Uthman's time, the Dawudids had been in conflict with the rival Idrisids (descendants of mai Idris I Nikalemi) for about a century. Uthman ruled for a few years and eventually became embroiled in civil war against an Idrisid prince, Ali Gaji. Although Uthman had the upper hand for most of the civil war, he was eventually defeated and dethroned by Ali, who replaced him as mai with the Idrisid Umar II.

Uthman was the last mai of the Dawudid line. After his defeat, Ali Gaji had the remaining Dawudids and their supporters driven away from imperial territory. The site of Uthman's death is recorded as Mikidhá.
