= Gaji of Bornu =

Gaji

Mai of the Kanem–Bornu Empire
- Reign: 15th century (5–6 years) c. 1456–1461 (Note: King lists (girgams) and chronicles translated in the 19th–20th centuries agree that Gaji ruled for five (Barth, Urvoy) or six (Palmer) years. Gaji is omitted in the lists of Nachtigal, and Landeroin. Due to differing dates and calculations for other mais, various dates have been given for his reign, including 1456–1461 (Barth), 1455–1461 (Palmer), 1458–1463 (Urvoy). Lange (1984) dated Gaji's reign to 1449–1454 whereas both Stewart (1989) and Bosworth (2012) used Barth's dates, 1456–1461.)
- Predecessor: Muhammad IV
- Successor: Uthman IV
- Died: c. 1461 "Matakla Ghamer"
- Dynasty: Sayfawa dynasty (?)
- Mother: Imala (Note: The name of Gaji's mother is rendered differently depending on the transcription. Cohen (1966) used Imala. Barth (1857) used "Amála or Imáta" and Palmer (1936) used Imalaha.)

Gaji (Note: The name is also rendered as Ghaji, Ghadji, Ghazi, and Rhadji, depending on the source.) (Ghājī), also recorded as Ali (‘Alī), (Note: Perhaps out of confusion with the later Ali I Gaji.) was mai (ruler) of the Kanem–Bornu Empire in the mid-15th century, ruling approximately 1456–1461. Possibly a usurper, Gaji ruled during the "Era of Instability", a chaotic period of internal and external conflict in the empire.

== Life ==
Later sources record Gaji as the son of Imala, a female name. Most known versions of the girgam (king list) of the Kanem–Bornu Empire do not give the name of Gaji's father. One girgam, translated by Richmond Palmer in 1926, designates Gaji as a son of mai Amarma. Modern scholars have proposed various connections to the empire's ruling Sayfawa dynasty. Yves Urvoy (1941) believed that Gaji was Amarma's son. In 1984, Dierk Lange suggested that Gaji was a son of mai Kade III and thus a brother of his immediate predecessor (Muhammad IV) and successor (Uthman IV). Ronald Cohen suggested in 1966 that the lack of a name for Gaji's father meant that he was a usurper, with no familial connection to the Sayfawa dynasty.

Gaji became mai in the mid-15th century, succeeding Muhammad IV. Gaji ruled for five or six years. His reign was noted for continued conflict against the Bilala of Kanem. During these wars, Gaji earned the nickname "the fever of the Bilala". Gaji was ultimately killed in battle by the Bilala ruler Muhammad bin Abdullah. He was succeeded as mai by Uthman IV. The site of Gaji's death is recorded as Matakla Ghamer (or variations thereof, such as Mangul Gainaram), possibly a corruption of "Bilala Gawala".
