= Amarma =

Mai of the Kanem–Bornu Empire
- Reign: 15th century (1–2 years) c. 1450–1451 (Note: King lists (girgams) and chronicles translated in the 19th–20th centuries agree that Amarma ruled for either one year (Barth, Nachtigal), one year and five months (Landeroin), or two years (Palmer, Urvoy). Due to differing dates and calculations for other mais, various dates have been given for his reign, including 1456 (Barth), 1450–1452 (Palmer), 1451–1453 (Urvoy), 1423–1424 (Landeroin), and 1451–1452 (Nachtigal). Cohen (1966) considered a reign of one year to be most likely. Lange (1984) dated Amarma's reign to 1444–1445, Stewart (1989) dated it to 1456, and Bosworth (2012) dated it to 1450–1451.)
- Predecessor: Muhammad III
- Successor: Muhammad IV
- Died: c. 1451 "Tármata" or "Yaramiya"
- Dynasty: Sayfawa dynasty
- Mother: Aisa

Amarma, (Note: There are many variations of Amarma's name across sources, including Amarma, Amer, Amr, Aman, and Mer.) also recorded as Hummay II, (Note: Landeroin (1911) recorded Amarma as Oumé, the same name he used for the earlier mai Hummay. This name is also rendered as Ume, Umme, and Oume, depending on the source.) was briefly mai (ruler) of the Kanem–Bornu Empire in the mid-15th century, ruling approximately 1450–1451. Possibly a usurper, Amarma ruled during the "Era of Instability", a chaotic period of internal and external conflict in the empire.

== Life ==
Amarma was the son of Aisa, daughter of mai Uthman. It is not clear which Uthman is meant in the sources, as several mais bore this name (Uthman I, Uthman II, Uthman III Kalinumuwa and Biri III Uthman). Lange (1984) suggested Biri III Uthman as the most likely candidate. Some sources state that it was Amarma's father (and not grandfather) who was named Uthman, presumably a mistake. (Note: Barth (1857) and Palmer (1936) did not name Amarma's father and named his mother as Aisa, daughter of Uthman. Nachtigal (1881), Landeroin (1911), and Urvoy (1941) named Amarma's father as Uthman. Urvoy also named his mother as Aisa, whereas Nachtigal and Landeroin did not include the names of the mothers of the mais in their lists.)

As the grandson of a monarch, Amarma bore the title of maidu. A maidu could advance to become a maina if their father became king, and therefore also become a possible successor to the throne. In the case of Amarma, this should have been impossible since he was maidu only through a female line. Amarma nevertheless succeeded Muhammad III as mai in the mid-15th century. Cohen (1966) proposed that Amarma usurped the throne whereas Lange (1984) opposed designating him as a usurper due to the limited evidence. Amarma ruled briefly, only one or two years, before dying at a site recorded as Tármata or Yarimiya (Yamia). He was succeeded as mai by Muhammad IV.
