= Biri IV =

Mai of the Kanem–Bornu Empire
- Reign: 15th century (1–6 years) c. 1444–1445 (Note: Biri is omitted in the 19th–20th century king lists (girgams) published by Barth, Palmer, and Urvoy. Nachtigal and Landeroin both assign Biri a 6-year reign. Nachtigal dated his reign to 1455–1461 and Landeroin dated it to 1427–1433. Among later scholars, Biri is also omitted by Lange (1984) and Stewart (1989). Cohen (1966) assigned Biri a reign of a single year without comment, contradicting Nachtigal and Landeroin's lists. Bosworth (2012) followed Cohen's assessment of a single year, dating Biri's reign to 1444–1445.)
- Predecessor: Kade III
- Successor: Dunama V Ahmad
- Died: c. 1445
- Dynasty: Sayfawa dynasty (Idrisid (Note: The 14th and 15th centuries saw protracted civil wars between the rival Idrisid (descendants of Idris I Nikalemi) and Dawudid (descendants of Dawud Nikalemi) branches of the Sayfawa dynasty.))
- Father: Dunama IV (?)

Biri IV (Biri bin Dunama) was briefly mai (ruler) of the Kanem–Bornu Empire in the mid-15th century, ruling approximately 1444–1445. Biri ruled during the "Era of Instability", a chaotic period of internal and external conflict in the empire.

== Life ==
Biri was the son of a mai named Dunama, probably Dunama IV. Biri became mai in the mid-15th century, after his predecessor Kade III had been defeated by the rival claimant Dunama V Ahmad. Biri ruled only briefly before he was succeeded by Dunama V Ahmad.
