= Muhammad IV of Bornu =

Muhammad IV

Mai of the Kanem–Bornu Empire
- Reign: 15th century (0–5 years) c. 1451–1456 (Note: Different king lists (girgams) and chronicles translated in the 19th–20th centuries give Muhammad different regnal lengths: a few days (Barth), 3 years (Palmer), or 5 years (Urvoy, Nachtigal, Landeroin). As a result of this, and due to different calculations for other mais, various dates have been given for his reign, including 1456 (Barth), 1452/1453–1455 (Palmer), 1453–1458 (Urvoy), 1364–1369 (Landeroin), and 1394–1399 (Nachtigal). The placement of Muhammad IV in the sequence of rulers differs considerably from the others in Landeroin and Nachtigal's lists. Cohen (1966) considered a reign of 5 years most likely. Lange (1984) dated Muhammad's reign to 1445–1449, Stewart (1989) dated it to 1456, and Bosworth (2012) dated it to 1451–1456.)
- Predecessor: Amarma
- Successor: Gaji
- Died: c. 1456 "Meghjibád-Nerí-Kerbúri"
- Dynasty: Sayfawa dynasty (Dawudid (Note: The 14th and 15th centuries saw protracted civil wars between the rival Idrisid (descendants of Idris I Nikalemi) and Dawudid (descendants of Dawud Nikalemi) branches of the Sayfawa dynasty.))
- Father: Kade III

Muhammad IV (Note: Some chronologies of Kanem–Bornu rulers omit the 14th-century Muhammad II Manza, lowering the regnal numbers of later rulers of this name. This ruler is then considered Muhammad III.) (Muḥammad bin Kade) was mai (ruler) of the Kanem–Bornu Empire in the mid-15th century, ruling approximately 1451–1456. Muhammad ruled during the "Era of Instability", a chaotic period of internal and external conflict in the empire.

== Life ==
Muhammad was a son of mai Kade III. Muhammad did not directly succeed his father, who had been killed by the rival claimant Dunama V Ahmad. Most reconstructions of this period place Muhammad as the successor of mai Amarma.

Later chronicles of the Kanem–Bornu Empire remembered Muhammad as a "cruel and sanguinary prince" and a tyrant. He had a brief reign; different sources give dates between as low as a few days and at most five years. The site of Muhammad's death is recorded as Meghjibád-Nerí-Kerbúri, or variations thereof (such as Magi Jibidam, Maki Zabatam). Muhammad was succeeded as mai by Gaji, whose relation to previous rulers is unclear.
