= Umar II of Bornu =

Umar II

Mai of the Kanem–Bornu Empire
- Reign: 15th century (1–3 years) c. 1466–1467 (Note: Different king lists (girgams) and chronicles translated in the 19th–20th centuries variously give Muhammad a reign of zero years (Urvoy), three years (Nachtigal, Landeroin), or one year (Barth, Palmer). As a result of this, and due to different calculations for other mais, various dates have been given for his reign, including 1466 (Barth), 1466–1467 (Palmer), 1424–1427 (Landeroin), and 1452–1455 (Nachtigal). Cohen (1966) considered a reign of one year to be most likely. Lange (1984) dated Muhammad's reign to 1459–1460, and both Stewart (1989) and Bosworth (2012) dated it to 1466–1467.)
- Predecessor: Uthman IV
- Successor: Muhammad V
- Died: c. 1467 "Ghomtalú"
- Dynasty: Sayfawa dynasty (Idrisid (Note: The 14th and 15th centuries saw protracted civil wars between the rival Idrisid (descendants of Idris I Nikalemi) and Dawudid (descendants of Dawud Nikalemi) branches of the Sayfawa dynasty.))
- Father: Abdullah III Dakumuni

Umar II (ʿUmar bin ʿAbdallāh) was briefly mai (ruler) of the Kanem–Bornu Empire in the mid-to-late 15th century, ruling approximately 1466–1467. Umar ruled during the "Era of Instability", a chaotic period of internal and external conflict in the empire.

== Life ==
Umar was a son of mai Abdullah III Dakumuni. Umar came to power as mai in the mid-to-late 15th century in the aftermath of the defeat and deposition of Uthman IV. For about a century, the empire had been plagued by civil wars between the Idrisid (descendants of mai Idris I Nikalemi) and Dawudid (descendants of mai Dawud Nikalemi) branches of the imperial family. These wars ended when the Idrisid prince Ali Gaji defeated Uthman, the last Dawudid ruler, and drove the remaining Dawudids and their supporters from the empire. Ali Gaji then acted as a kingmaker, to the benefit of Umar.

Umar was a despotic ruler who ruled without consultation with the nobility, according to the girgam (royal chronicle), "his chiefs did not assemble in council." Umar spent his entire reign, either a single year or three years, in competition with Muhammad V, a more powerful and successful rival claimant. Over the course of a year, Muhammad gained the upper hand in the conflict and eventually deposed (and probably killed) Umar. The site of Umar's death is recorded as Ghomtalú (or variations thereof, such as Gamtilo Jilarge).
