= Kade II Afunu =

Mai of the Kanem–Bornu Empire
- Reign: 14th century (1 year) c. 1389–1390 (Note: King lists (girgams) and chronicles translated in the 19th–20th centuries (Barth, Palmer, Urvoy, Nachtigal, Landeroin) all agree that Kade ruled for a single year. Due to differing dates and calculations for other mais, various dates have been given for his reign, including 1399–1400 (Barth), 1391–1392 (Palmer), 1388–1389 (Urvoy), 1398–1399 (Landeroin), and 1427–1428 (Nachtigal). Lange (1984) dated his reign to 1388–1389, Stewart (1989) dated it to 1399–1400, and Bosworth (2012) dated it to 1389–1390.)
- Predecessor: Muhammad II Manza
- Successor: Biri III Uthman
- Died: c. 1390 "Ghadhurú"
- Dynasty: Sayfawa dynasty (Idrisid (Note: The 14th and 15th centuries saw protracted civil wars between the rival Idrisid (descendants of Idris I Nikalemi) and Dawudid (descendants of Dawud Nikalemi) branches of the Sayfawa dynasty.))
- Father: Idris I Nikalemi

Kade II (Kade bin Idrīs), called Kade Afunu (Note: The name is also spelled A'fno and A'funu.) and Kade Auja, was briefly mai (ruler) of the Kanem–Bornu Empire in the late 14th century, ruling approximately 1389–1390. Kade ruled during the "Era of Instability", a chaotic period of internal and external conflict in the empire.

== Life ==
Kade was a son of mai Idris I Nikalemi. The name Afunu may mean that Kade's mother was of Hausa (A'fno) origin. Kade became mai in the late 14th century, succeeding his brother Muhammad II Manza.

The late 14th century was a time of acute political instability in Bornu, marked by internal conflict between members of the imperial family as well as external conflict, mainly with the Bilala in the east. Kanem, the empire's original heartland, had been lost to the Bilala a few years before Kade's reign, when the empire was ruled by Kade's brother Umar I Idrismi. Kade resumed the offensive against the Bilala but was defeated and killed in battle at a site recorded as Ghadhurú (or variations thereof, such as Guluru or Gaduru), after only a year on the throne. Kade was succeeded as mai by his brother Biri III Uthman.
