= Ali I Gaji =

Mai of the Kanem–Bornu Empire
- Reign: 15th/16th century (27–34 years) c. 1470–1503 (Note: Different king lists (girgams) and chronicles translated in the 19th–20th centuries give Ali different regnal lengths: 27 years (Nachtigal, Palmer), 28 years (Landeroin), 33 years (Barth), or 34 years (Urvoy). As a result of this, and due to different calculations for other mais, various dates have been given for his reign, including 1472–1504 (Barth), 1476–1503 (Palmer), 1473–1507 (Urvoy), 1437–1465 (Landeroin), and 1465–1492 (Nachtigal). Both Palmer and Urvoy provide precise but different dates for Ali's death: 3 April 1503 (Palmer) and 29 March 1507 (Urvoy). Cohen (1966) considered a reign of 33 years most likely. Stewart (1989) dated Ali's reign to 1472–1504 and Bosworth (2012) dated Ali's reign to 1470–1503. Lipschutz & Rasmussen (1986) also dated Ali's reign to 1470–1503.)
- Predecessor: Muhammad V
- Successor: Idris III Katagarmabe
- Died: c. 1503; Ngazargamu, Bornu
- Spouse: Aisa
- Issue: Idris III Katagarmabe
- Dynasty: Sayfawa dynasty (Idrisid (Note: The 14th and 15th centuries saw protracted civil wars between the rival Idrisid (descendants of Idris I Nikalemi) and Dawudid (descendants of Dawud Nikalemi) branches of the Sayfawa dynasty.))
- Father: Dunama V Ahmad
- Mother: Zainab

Ali I (‘Alī bin Dunama), called Ali Gaji, was mai (ruler) of the Kanem–Bornu Empire in the late 15th and early 16th century, ruling approximately 1470–1503. Considered one of the greatest rulers of the empire, Ali is most widely known for founding the new imperial capital of Ngazargamu.

Ali ended the century-long civil wars between the Idrisid and Dawudid branches of the imperial family and his reign saw military expansion and important administrative reforms, and an overall increase in imperial prestige. These numerous achievements are seen by several historians as marking the beginning of a second era of the Kanem–Bornu Empire.

== Names ==
Ali is known under various names and nicknames. The most common nickname, Ghājī, is variously rendered as Gaji or Ghaji, and sometimes as Gajideni or as Gazi or Ghazi. This epithet has variously been attributed a Kanuri or Arabic linguistic origin, with different meanings. If Kanuri, Ghājī means "the little" or "the younger" and is in Kanuri families often given to the last child born in the family. If Arabic, Ghājī may be derived from al-ghazi and mean "the conqueror".

Ali is also known as Ali Zenamami, in accordance with the Bornu tradition of tracing descent through the mother (in this case, Zainab). He is also called Ali Dunamami after his father, mai Dunama V Ahmad.

== Life ==
Ali was a son of mai Dunama V Ahmad. His mother was named Zainab. Ali grew up in a chaotic era of the Kanem–Bornu Empire. Approximately a century before Ali's reign, the empire's former heartland, Kanem, had been lost to the Bilala following conflicts in the 14th century, which had forced mai Umar I Idrismi to re-center the empire in the region of Bornu, west of Lake Chad. The 14th and 15th centuries had also been plagued by protracted civil wars within the empire, fought between descendants of mai Idris I Nikalemi ("Idrisids") and mai Dawud Nikalemi ("Dawudids") for the throne. These destructive civil wars nearly tore the empire apart.

Ali was a descendant of Idris I. In the mid-15th century, Ali put an end to the Dawudid–Idrisid wars through his defeat and deposition of the last Dawudid mai, Uthman IV. All remaining Dawudids and their supporters were banished from imperial territory. Ali then acted as a kingmaker in the reigns of mais Umar II and Muhammad V, before Ali himself became mai.

As mai, Ali is widely considered to have been one of the empire's greatest rulers and as marking the start of the second era of the Kanem–Bornu Empire. In the aftermath of the long civil wars, Ali instigated vital governmental reforms. Previously overly powerful titleholders such as the kaigama (chief general) had their power reduced. A new policy was enacted that the empire's major fief holders were to be stationed in the capital and rule their fiefs through representatives, placing the most prominent nobles in the empire under the strict supervision of the imperial court. To centralise the administration, Ali founded the large capital of Ngazargamu, situated on the southern bank of the Komadugu Yobe River, near the border of modern-day Nigeria and Niger. This capital remained the focal point of power for the empire's rulers for three and a half centuries, until it was destroyed during the Fula jihads in the 19th century.

Ali was a powerful warrior-king and engaged in several military campaigns, including confrontations with Kwararafa in the south, and the extraction of tribute from a number of Hausa states in the west, including Kano, the commercial centre of the region. Furthermore, he expanded the empire northward into Borku and Tibesti and regained control over the northern desert trade routes. There was also heavy fighting with the Bilala of Kanem in Ali's reign. Although some accounts attribute victory in these conflicts to Ali, neither side appears to have achieved any significant territorial gains.

Bornu gained notable prestige under Ali's rule. The Arab traveller Leo Africanus underscored the significance of Bornu in trans-Saharan trade during Ali's reign. This period marked Bornu's first appearances on European maps of Africa, produced by Portuguese cartographers in the late 15th-century.

Ali ruled for over twenty years, perhaps for over thirty. He died at Ngazargamu and was succeeded as mai by his son Idris III Katagarmabe.
