= Abdullah III Dakumuni =

Mai of the Kanem–Bornu Empire
- Reign: 15th century (7–9 years) c. 1425–1433 (Note: Different king lists (girgams) and chronicles translated in the 19th–20th centuries assign Abdullah a reign of 7 years (Landeroin, Nachtigal), 8 years (Barth, Urvoy), or 9 years (Palmer). As a result of this, and due to different calculations for other mais, various dates have been given for his reign, including 1435–1442 (Barth), 1427–1436 (Palmer), 1424–1432 (Urvoy), 1411–1418 (Landeroin), and 1439–1446 (Nachtigal). Cohen (1966) considered a reign of 8 years most likely. Later authors have also proposed different dates. Lange (1984) and Stewart (1989) both assigned Abdullah a 7-year reign, dated to 1424–1431 and 1435–1442, respectively. Bosworth (2012) assigned Abdullah an eight-year reign, dated to 1425–1433.)
- Predecessor: Dunama IV
- Successor: Ibrahim II
- Died: c. 1433 "Famelfa"
- Issue: Umar II
- Dynasty: Sayfawa dynasty (Idrisid (Note: The 14th and 15th centuries saw protracted civil wars between the rival Idrisid (descendants of Idris I Nikalemi) and Dawudid (descendants of Dawud Nikalemi) branches of the Sayfawa dynasty.))
- Father: Umar I Idrismi

Abdullah III (Note: Also recorded as Dala.) (ʿAbdallāh bin ʿUmar), called Abdullah Dakumuni and Abdallah Auja, was mai (ruler) of the Kanem–Bornu Empire in the early 15th century, ruling approximately 1425–1433. Abdullah ruled during the "Era of Instability", a chaotic period of internal and external conflict in the empire.

== Life ==
Abdullah was a son of mai Umar I Idrismi. Abdullah became mai in the early 15th century, succeeding his brother Dunama IV.

Later sources attribute Abdullah a reign of seven to nine years. For some part of his reign, Abdullah was engaged in a civil war against his kaigama (chief general), Abdullah Dighelma. Dighelma was victorious in the war and dethroned Abdullah, replacing him as mai with Ibrahim II. The sources are confused on Abdullah's subsequent career. A royal chronicle translated by the German explorer Heinrich Barth in the mid-19th century records that Ibrahim reigned for several years and that Abdullah was made mai again by Dighelma after Ibrahim's death. Barth's chronicle contradictorily also states that Ibrahim was murdered by Kade III, who then seized the throne.

The site of Abdullah's death is recorded as Famelfa, or variations thereof, such as Malfe.
