= Ibrahim II of Bornu =

Ibrahim II

Mai of the Kanem–Bornu Empire
- Reign: 15th century (7–8 years) c. 1433–1440 (Note: Different king lists (girgams) and chronicles translated in the 19th–20th centuries assign Ibrahim a reign of 7 years (Palmer) or 8 years (Barth, Urvoy). He is omitted in the lists of Landeroin and Nachtigal. As a result of this, and due to different calculations for other mais, various dates have been given for his reign, including 1442–1450 (Barth), 1436–1443 (Palmer), and 1432–1440 (Urvoy). Cohen (1966) considered a reign of 8 years most likely. Later authors have also proposed different dates. Lange (1984) and Stewart (1989) both assigned Ibrahim an eight-year reign, dated to 1431–1439 and 1442–1450, respectively. Bosworth (2012) assigned Ibrahim a 7-year reign, dated to 1433–1440.)
- Predecessor: Abdullah III Dakumuni
- Successor: Kade III
- Died: c. 1440; Zamtam, Bornu
- Dynasty: Sayfawa dynasty (Dawudid (Note: The 14th and 15th centuries saw protracted civil wars between the rival Idrisid (descendants of Idris I Nikalemi) and Dawudid (descendants of Dawud Nikalemi) branches of the Sayfawa dynasty.))
- Father: Uthman III Kalinumuwa (?)

Ibrahim II (Ibrāhīm bin ʿUthmān) was mai (ruler) of the Kanem–Bornu Empire in the early-to-mid 15th century, ruling approximately 1440–1444. Ibrahim ruled during the "Era of Instability", a chaotic period of internal and external conflict in the empire.

== Life ==
Ibrahim was the son of a mai named Uthman, probably Uthman III Kalinumuwa. The chronology of Ibrahim's reign is confused in the sources. The girgam and diwan (later Kanem–Bornu sources) attribute Ibrahim a reign of seven or eight years and designates him as the successor of mai Abdullah III Dakumuni and the predecessor of Kade III. Kade's father was also named Uthman and he may thus have been Ibrahim's brother.

An account of the reigns of different mais translated by the German explorer Heinrich Barth in the mid-19th century records that Ibrahim was placed on the throne by the kaigama (chief general) Abdullah Dighelma, who had been engaged in a civil war against Abdullah III Dakumuni. Upon Ibrahim's death, Dighelma is said to have made Abdullah III Dakumuni mai again. Barth also contradictorily records that Ibrahim was murdered by Kade III, who then seized the throne. Regardless of the chronology, Ibrahim is said to have been an unpopular ruler, who did not keep a regular court and rarely, if at all, showed himself to the public, inspiring discontent among the people. He is said to not have "covered the land in his majesty" and to have "listened to hearsay".

Ibrahim ruled for seven or eight years. Ibrahim died at Zamtam in Bornu, north of modern-day Gamboru.
