= Dunama IV =

Mai of the Kanem–Bornu Empire
- Reign: 15th century (2–4 years) c. 1423–1425 (Note: Different king lists (girgams) and chronicles translated in the 19th–20th centuries assign Dunama a reign of 2 years (Barth, Palmer, Urvoy) or 4 years (Landeroin, Nachtigal). As a result of this, and due to different calculations for other mais, various dates have been given for his reign, including 1433–1434 (Barth), 1425–1427 (Palmer), 1422–1424 (Urvoy), 1407–1411 (Landeroin), and 1435–1439 (Nachtigal). Cohen (1966) considered a reign of 2 years most likely. Lange (1984) dated Dunama's reign to 1422–1424, Stewart (1989) dated it to 1433–1435, and Bosworth (2012) dated it to 1423–1425.)
- Predecessor: Uthman III Kalinumuwa
- Successor: Abdullah III Dakumuni
- Died: c. 1425 "Nánigham"
- Issue: Biri IV (?)
- Dynasty: Sayfawa dynasty (Idrisid (Note: The 14th and 15th centuries saw protracted civil wars between the rival Idrisid (descendants of Idris I Nikalemi) and Dawudid (descendants of Dawud Nikalemi) branches of the Sayfawa dynasty.))
- Father: Umar I Idrismi

Dunama IV (Note: Some chronologies of Kanem–Bornu rulers omit the 14th-century Dunama III, lowering the regnal numbers of later rulers of this name. This ruler is then considered Dunama III.) (Dunama bin ʿUmar) was mai (ruler) of the Kanem–Bornu Empire in the early 15th century, ruling approximately 1423–1425. Dunama ruled during the "Era of Instability", a chaotic period of internal and external conflict in the empire.

== Life ==
Dunama was a son of mai Umar I Idrismi. Duname became mai in the early 15th century after the deposition of his predecessor, Uthman III Kalinumuwa. Uthman was overthrown by the kaigama (chief general) Nikale bin Ibrahim and the yerima (another prominent official) Kade. According to the girgam (royal chronicle of the empire), Dunama's horses "were to him as mothers".

Dunama ruled for two or four years. He was murdered at a site recorded as Nánigham and succeeded as mai by his brother Abdullah III Dakumuni.
