= Dunama V Ahmad =

Mai of the Kanem–Bornu Empire
- Reign: 15th century (4 years) c. 1445–1449 (Note: All king lists (girgams) and chronicles translated in the 19th–20th centuries (Barth, Palmer, Urvoy, Nachtigal, Landeroin) agree that Dunama ruled for four years. Due to differing dates and calculations for other mais, various dates have been given for his reign, including 1451–1455 (Barth), 1444–1448 (Palmer), 1446–1450 (Urvoy), 1433–1437 (Nachtigal), and 1461–1465 (Landeroin). Lange (1984) dated Dunama's reign to 1440–1444, Stewart (1989) dated it to 1451–1455, and Bosworth (2012) dated it to 1445–1449.)
- Predecessor: Biri IV
- Successor: Muhammad III
- Died: c. 1449 "Aghakúwah"
- Spouse: Zainab
- Issue: Ali I Gaji
- Dynasty: Sayfawa dynasty (Idrisid (Note: The 14th and 15th centuries saw protracted civil wars between the rival Idrisid (descendants of Idris I Nikalemi) and Dawudid (descendants of Dawud Nikalemi) branches of the Sayfawa dynasty.))
- Father: Biri III Uthman

Ahmad Dunama (Aḥmad Dunama bin Biri), enumerated as Dunama V, (Note: Some chronologies of Kanem–Bornu rulers omit the 14th-century Dunama III, lowering the regnal numbers of later rulers of this name. This ruler is then considered Dunama IV.) was mai (ruler) of the Kanem–Bornu Empire in the mid-15th century, ruling approximately 1445–1449. Dunama ruled during the "Era of Instability", a chaotic period of internal and external conflict in the empire.

== Life ==
Dunama was a son of mai Biri III Uthman. Before he became mai, Dunama was a rival claimant in dynastic conflicts against his predecessors. Dunama defeated and killed mai Kade III and became mai himself after the brief reign of mai Biri IV.

Dunama ruled for four years. The site of Dunama's death is recorded as Aghakúwah (or variations there of, such as Kowwa). Dunama was succeeded as mai by Muhammad III.
