= Kade III =

Mai of the Kanem–Bornu Empire
- Reign: 15th century (1–7 years) c. 1440–1444 (Note: Different king lists (girgams) and chronicles translated in the 19th–20th centuries give Kade different regnal lengths: 1 year (Barth, Palmer), 6 years (Urvoy, Nachtigal), or 7 years (Landeroin). As a result of this, and due to different calculations for other mais, various dates have been given for his reign, including 1450–1451 (Barth), 1443–1444 (Palmer), 1440–1446 (Urvoy), 1346–1353 (Landeroin), and 1377–1383 (Nachtigal). Kade's position in Landeroin's and Nachtigal's lists is considerably different from the others. Cohen (1966) contradicted the figures from the list and instead considered a reign of 4 years most likely. Later authors have also proposed different dates. Lange (1984) and Stewart (1989) both assigned Kade a one-year reign, dated to 1439–1440 and 1450–1451, respectively. Bosworth (2012) followed Cohen's 4-year figure and dated Kade's reign to 1440–1444.)
- Predecessor: Ibrahim II
- Successor: Biri IV
- Died: c. 1444 "Amará"/"Amazá" or Damasak, Bornu
- Issue: Muhammad IV; Uthman IV
- Dynasty: Sayfawa dynasty (Dawudid (Note: The 14th and 15th centuries saw protracted civil wars between the rival Idrisid (descendants of Idris I Nikalemi) and Dawudid (descendants of Dawud Nikalemi) branches of the Sayfawa dynasty.))
- Father: Uthman III Kalinumuwa (?)

Kade III (Note: The name is also spelled Kadai.) (Kade bin ʿUthmān) was mai (ruler) of the Kanem–Bornu Empire in the mid-15th century, ruling approximately 1440–1444. Kade ruled during the "Era of Instability", a chaotic period of internal and external conflict in the empire.

== Life ==
Kade was the son of a mai named Uthman, probably Uthman III Kalinumuwa. The account of Kade's rise to the throne is confused in the sources. A royal chronicle translated by the German explorer Heinrich Barth in the mid-19th century describes Kade as taking the throne after murdering his predecessor, the unpopular mai Ibrahim II. Ibrahim was also a son of "Uthman" and thus possibly Kade's brother. In a preceding section, Barth's chronicle also contradictorily describes Ibrahim II to have been placed upon the throne during the reign of mai Abdullah III Dakumuni, who ruled again for a brief period after Ibrahim's death.

Kade had a short reign. He was killed during dynastic succession conflicts by a rival, Dunama V Ahmad, and was succeeded as mai by Biri IV. The site of Kade's death is variously recorded as Amará/Amazá, or Damaza (Damasak).
