= Uthman I of Kanem =

Uthman I

Mai of the Kanem–Bornu Empire
- Reign: 14th century (0–4 years) c. 1363–1366 (Note: King lists (girgams) and chronicles translated in the 19th–20th centuries assign Uthman a reign 8 months (Palmer, Landeroin), 1 year (Nachtigal), 3 years (Urvoy), or 4 years (Barth). Due to differing dates and calculations for other mais, various dates have been given for his reign, including 1387–1390 (Barth), 1386 (Palmer), 1366–1369 (Urvoy), 1338 (Landeroin), and 1368–1369 (Nachtigal). Cohen (1966) considered a reign of 3 years most likely. Lange (1984) dated Uthman's reign to 1376–1379, Stewart (1989) dated it to 1386–1391, and Bosworth (2012) dated it to 1363–1366.)
- Predecessor: Dawud Nikalemi
- Successor: Uthman II
- Died: c. 1366; Njimi, Kanem
- Dynasty: Sayfawa dynasty (Dawudid (Note: The 14th and 15th centuries saw protracted civil wars between the rival Idrisid (descendants of Idris I Nikalemi) and Dawudid (descendants of Dawud Nikalemi) branches of the Sayfawa dynasty.))
- Father: Dawud Nikalemi

Uthman I (ʿUthmān bin Dāwūd) was mai (ruler) of the Kanem–Bornu Empire in the mid-14th century, ruling approximately 1363–1366.

== Life ==
Uthman I was a son of mai Dawud Nikalemi, who he succeeded as mai in the mid-14th century. In Dawud's reign, the empire had been invaded from the east by the Bilala. The invasion saw the death of Dawud in battle and the loss of the imperial capital, Njimi, to the Bilala. Uthman I continued the war against the Bilala and had some initial success, even recapturing Njimi. Uthman was not able to completely turn the tide of the conflict and was after a short reign defeated and killed at Njimi by the resurgent Bilala. He was succeeded as mai by his namesake cousin Uthman II.
