= Abubakar Liyatu =

Mai of the Kanem–Bornu Empire
- Reign: 14th century (0–1 years) c. 1368–1369 (Note: King lists (girgams) and chronicles translated in the 19th–20th centuries assign Abubakar a reign of 0 years (Palmer), 9 months (Barth), or 1 year (Urvoy, Nachtigal, Landeroin). Due to differing dates and calculations for other mais, various dates have been given for his reign, including 1392 (Barth), 1386 (Palmer), 1371–1372 (Urvoy), 1338–1339 (Landeroin), and 1369–1370 (Nachtigal). Cohen (1966) considered a reign of one year most likely. Lange (1984) dated Abubakar's reign to 1381–1382, Stewart (1989) dated it to 1392–1394, and Bosworth (2012) dated it to 1368–1369.)
- Predecessor: Uthman II
- Successor: Idris II Saradima and Dunama III
- Died: c. 1369 "Shefiyári", Kanem
- Dynasty: Sayfawa dynasty (Dawudid (Note: The 14th and 15th centuries saw protracted civil wars between the rival Idrisid (descendants of Idris I Nikalemi) and Dawudid (descendants of Dawud Nikalemi) branches of the Sayfawa dynasty.))
- Father: Dawud Nikalemi

Abubakar (Abū Bakr bin Dāwūd), called Abubakar Liyatu (meaning "Abubakar the Illustrious"), was briefly mai (ruler) of the Kanem–Bornu Empire in the mid-14th century, ruling approximately 1368–1369.

== Life ==
Abubakar was a son of mai Dawud Nikalemi. Abubakar became mai in the mid-14th century, succeeding his cousin Uthman II. Uthman had died in battle against the Bilala, who were invading the empire from the east. Abubakar likewise fought against the Bilala and was killed in battle by the invaders after mere months on the throne. The site of Abubakar's death is recorded as Shefiyári (or variations thereof, such as Sefiari N'gazriwan) in Kanem. Abubakar was succeeded as mai by Idris II Saradima and Dunama III, who may have ruled together.
