= Muhammad III of Bornu =

Mai of Kanem–Bornu Empire

Muhammad III

Mai of the Kanem–Bornu Empire
- Reign: 15th century (0–5 years) c. 1449–1450 (Note: Different king lists (girgams) and chronicles translated in the 19th–20th centuries give Muhammad different regnal lengths: 5 months (Barth), 1 year (Urvoy), 2 years (Palmer), or 5 years (Landeroin, Nachtigal). As a result of this, and due to different calculations for other mais, various dates have been given for his reign, including 1455 (Barth), 1448–1450 (Palmer), 1450–1451 (Urvoy), 1418–1423 (Landeroin), and 1446–1451 (Nachtigal). Cohen (1966) considered a reign of one year most likely. Later authors have also proposed different dates: 1444 (Lange, 1983), 1455–1456 (Stewart, 1989), and 1449–1450 (Bosworth, 2012).)
- Predecessor: Dunama V Ahmad
- Successor: Amarma
- Died: c. 1450; Damasak, Bornu
- Dynasty: Sayfawa dynasty (?)
- Father: Abdullah (?)
- Mother: Matala

Muhammad III (Note: Some chronologies of Kanem–Bornu rulers omit the 14th-century Muhammad II Manza, lowering the regnal numbers of later rulers of this name. This ruler is then considered Muhammad II.) (Muḥammad) was briefly mai (ruler) of the Kanem–Bornu Empire in the mid-15th century, ruling approximately 1449–1450. Possibly a usurper, Muhammad ruled during the "Era of Instability", a chaotic period of internal and external conflict in the empire.

== Life ==
Muhammad's connection to the Kanem–Bornu Empire's ruling Sayfawa dynasty is unclear. In a royal list (girgam) translated by Heinrich Barth in the mid-19th century, Muhammad is designated as the son of Matala. Muhammad was also designated as a son of Matala by the later scholars Richmond Palmer (1936) and Yves Urvoy (1941). Matala is a female name. There is no mention of Matala having any royal status or what her connection was to the Sayfawa dynasty. As a title, matala was connected to the sister of the ruling mai; Muhammad may thus have been the nephew of one of his predecessors.

Girgams translated by Gustav Nachtigal (1881) and Moïse Landeroin (1911) do not include the mothers of the mais but state that Muhammad's father was named Abdullah. In 1984, Dierk Lange proposed that Muhammad was the brother of his predecessor (Dunama V Ahmad) and thus a son of Biri III Uthman, and that his royal lineage had been omitted in Barth's girgam because he directly followed his brother and this was "presumed to be known". Lange opposed the suggestion that Muhammad was a usurper.

Muhammad ruled briefly, though the sources vary on the length of his reign. Muhammad died at Damasak. He was succeeded by Amarma.
