= Uthman II of Kanem =

Uthman II

Mai of the Kanem–Bornu Empire
- Reign: 14th century (2 years) c. 1366–1368 (Note: Among the king lists (girgams) and chronicles translated in the 19th–20th centuries, Uthman II appears only in those of Barth and Urvoy, being omitted by Palmer, Nachtigal, and Landeroin. Dates used for mais vary among sources due to slight discrepancies and differing calculations. Both Barth and Urvoy assigned Uthman a reign of two years, Barth dating it to 1391–1392 and Urvoy dating it to 1369–1371. Lange (1984) dated Uthman's reign to 1379–1381, Stewart (1989) dated it to 1391–1392, and Bosworth (2012) dated it to 1366–1368.)
- Predecessor: Uthman I
- Successor: Abubakar Liyatu
- Died: c. 1368; Njimi, Kanem
- Dynasty: Sayfawa dynasty (Idrisid (Note: The 14th and 15th centuries saw protracted civil wars between the rival Idrisid (descendants of Idris I Nikalemi) and Dawudid (descendants of Dawud Nikalemi) branches of the Sayfawa dynasty.))
- Father: Idris I Nikalemi
- Mother: Famafa

Uthman II (ʿUthmān bin Idrīs) was mai (ruler) of the Kanem–Bornu Empire in the mid-14th century, ruling approximately 1366–1368.

== Life ==
Uthman II was a son of mai Idris I Nikalemi. His mother was named Famafa. Uthman II became mai in the mid-14th century, succeeding his namesake cousin Uthman I. Uthman I had died in battle against the Bilala, who were invading the empire from the east. Uthman II continued the war for two years, until he met the same fate. Like his predecessor, Uthman II was defeated and killed at Njimi (the imperial capital). He was succeeded as mai by his cousin (Uthman I's brother) Abubakar Liyatu.
