= Fitri =

Fitri may refer to:

- Fitri Department, Chad
- Lake Fitri, Chad
