= Uthman III Kalinumuwa =

Mai of the Kanem–Bornu Empire
- Reign: 15th century (0–1 years) c. 1422–1423 (Note: Different king lists (girgams) and chronicles translated in the 19th–20th centuries assign Uthman a reign of 0 years (Palmer), 9 months (Barth), and 1 year (Urvoy). He is omitted in the regnal lists of Landeroin and Nachtigal. As a result of this, and due to different calculations for other mais, various dates have been given for his reign, including 1432 (Barth), 1425 (Palmer), and 1421–1422 (Urvoy). Lange (1984) dated his reign to 1421–1422, Stewart (1989) dated it to 1432–1433, and Bosworth (2012) dated it to 1422–1423.)
- Predecessor: Biri III Uthman
- Successor: Dunama IV
- Died: Kano (?)
- Issue: Ibrahim II (?); Kade III (?)
- Dynasty: Sayfawa dynasty (Dawudid (Note: The 14th and 15th centuries saw protracted civil wars between the rival Idrisid (descendants of Idris I Nikalemi) and Dawudid (descendants of Dawud Nikalemi) branches of the Sayfawa dynasty.))
- Father: Dawud Nikalemi

Uthman III (ʿUthmān bin Dāwūd), called Uthman Kalinumuwa (Note: The name is also spelled Kalinumawa, Kalnama, and Kalinwama.) and Uthman Daudumi, was briefly mai (ruler) of the Kanem–Bornu Empire in the early 15th century, ruling approximately 1422–1423. Uthman ruled during the "Era of Instability", a chaotic period of internal and external conflict in the empire. After his deposition, he spent the latter part of his life in Kano where he is remembered by the Hausa title of dagaci.

== Life ==
Uthman was a son of mai Dawud Nikalemi. Uthman became mai in the early 15th century, succeeding his cousin Biri III Uthman.

Uthman's reign was very brief, perhaps shorter than a year. He was overthrown by a party led by the kaigama (chief general) Nikale bin Ibrahim and the yerima (another high official) Kade. Uthman fled from the country and sought refuge among the Hausa states, probably in the Kingdom of Kano. Uthman was succeeded as mai with Dunama IV, a nephew of Biri III.

Uthman probably died in his place of exile, presumably Kano. The site of his death has also alternatively been recorded as "Bursulum".
