= Ibn Furtu =

16th century Imam in Kanem-Bornu Empire

Ibn Furtu Arabic: أحمد بن فرتو
- Died: c. 1600
- Occupations: Scribe, scholar, Grand Imam

Ahmad bin Furtu or Ibn Furtu (sometimes also called Ibn Fartuwa) was the sixteenth century grand Imam of the Bornu Empire and the chronicler of Mai Idris Alooma (1564–1596).

== Writing ==
He wrote two chronicles in Arabic, K. ghazawat Barnu ("The Book of the Bornu Wars") in 1576 and K. ghazawat Kanei ("The Book of the Kanem Wars") in 1578. The first book describes in geographical order the military expeditions of Mai Idris Alooma: 1. against the Sao-Gafata in the region of the Komadugu Yobe; 2. against the town of Amsaka south of Lake Chad; 3. against the town of Kano west of Bornu; 4. against the Tuareg of Aïr; 5. against the Margi people and against Mandara south of Lake Chad; 6. against the Ngizim west of Bornu and 7. against the Sao-Tatala at the edge of Lake Chad and against some towns of the Kotoko. Except a few details on the military achievements of the five predecessors of Idris Alooma he focusses his attention on the expeditions of his Sultan during the first twelve years of his reign.

The book on the Kanem wars deals with seven consecutive expeditions against the Bulala from ca. 1573 to 1578. Information on earlier events at the beginning and the end of the book concern the destruction of the national relic called Mune by Dunama Dabbalemi (1203–1242), the expulsion of the Sayfawa from Kanem by the Bulala and the temporary reoccupation of the ancient capital of Kanem, Njimi, by Idris Katakarmabe (1487–1509). Some classical poems and quotations from lexicographical books bear witness of the solid education of the author. His somewhat contrived style is characterized by its archaism.

== Bibliography ==
- Dewière, Rémi. L'esclave, le savant et le sultan. Représentations du monde et diplomatie au sultanat du Borno (XVIe-XVIIe siècles), thèse de doctorat dirigée par le professeur Bertrand Hirsch, Université Paris 1 Panthéon Sorbonne, 2015, 713 f.
- Lange, Dierk (1987). A Sudanic Chronicle: The Borno Expeditions of Idris Alauma (1564–1576). Stuttgart: Steiner. ISBN 3-515-04926-6.
- Palmer, H.R.: "The Kanem wars", in: Sudanese Memoirs', vol. I, p. 15-81.
- Palmer, H.R. History of the First Twelve Years of the Reign of Mai Idris Alooma of Bornu (1571 - 1583). Routledge Revivals.
