= Biri III Uthman =

Mai of the Kanem–Bornu Empire
- Reign: 14th/15th century (32–33 years) c. 1390–1422 (Note: Different king lists (girgams) and chronicles translated in the 19th–20th centuries assign Biri a reign of 32 years (Urvoy) or 33 years (Barth, Palmer). He is omitted in the regnal lists of Landeroin and Nachtigal. As a result of this, and due to different calculations for other mais, various dates have been given for his reign, including 1400–1432 (Barth), 1392–1424/1425 (Palmer), and 1389–1421 (Urvoy). Lange (1984) dated his reign to 1389–1421, Stewart (1989) dated it to 1400–1432, and Bosworth (2012) dated it to 1390–1422.)
- Predecessor: Kade II Afunu
- Successor: Uthman III Kalinumuwa
- Died: c. 1422 "Kanántú"
- Issue: Dunama V Ahmad
- Dynasty: Sayfawa dynasty (Idrisid (Note: The 14th and 15th centuries saw protracted civil wars between the rival Idrisid (descendants of Idris I Nikalemi) and Dawudid (descendants of Dawud Nikalemi) branches of the Sayfawa dynasty.))
- Father: Idris I Nikalemi

Biri Uthman or Uthman Biri (Biri, Biri ʿUthmān, ʿUthmān Biri, or ʿUthmān bin Idrīs), enumerated as Biri III, was mai (ruler) of the Kanem–Bornu Empire in the late 14th and early 15th century, ruling approximately 1390–1422. Biri ruled during the "Era of Instability", a chaotic period of internal and external conflict in the empire, and had an exceptionally long reign for the period. Contemporary correspondence survives between Biri and Barquq, the Mamluk sultan of Egypt.

== Life ==
Biri was a son of mai Idris I Nikalemi. Biri became mai in the late 14th century, succeeding his brother Kade II Afunu.

Biri ruled for 32 or 33 years, an exceptionally long reign for the chaotic period experienced by the empire in his time. Although he successfully maintained his hold on the throne, Biri's reign was not peaceful. At some point in his reign, Biri fought a civil war against his kaigama (chief general) Muhammad bin Diltu.

A letter from Biri to the Mamluk sultan Barquq of Egypt, dated 1391–1392, contains the earliest known reference to the Shuwa Arabs in the Chad Basin. In the letter, Biri refers to them as Judham Arabs and accuses them of causing much devastation in Bornu through constant slave raiding. The Banu Judham were Yemeni Arabs who were influential in Fatimid Egypt but lost much of their status with the rise of the Ayyubid dynasty in the 12th century, leading them to revolt. Subsequent Mamluk sultans were more aggressive in crushing the rebellion. The Banu Judham were forced out of Egypt and migrated south. By Biri's reign in the late 14th century, they had established themselves in the Chad Basin.

The site of Biri's death is recorded as Kanántú, which may have been located in the territory later occupied by the Sultanate of Bagirmi.
