= Yao, Chad =

Yao ياؤ
- Location in Chad
- Coordinates: 12°51′03″N 017°33′39″E
- Country: Chad
- Region: Batha
- Department: Fitri
- Sub-Prefecture: Yao
- Time zone: +1

Yao (Arabic: ياؤ) is a town in Chad and the capital of the Fitri department.

Yao is also the name of a pre-colonial Sultanate in the same area, the Yao Sultanate.
