= Batha River =

River in Chad

Location
- Country: Chad

Physical characteristics
- Mouth
  - coordinates: 12.8452°N 17.601°E

The Batha River is an ephemeral river in Chad. As with any rivers or lakes in this region, its existence depends on the amount of rainfall. The river's delta is at Lake Fitri in Chad. Batha River carries water west from Ouaddaï highlands during rainy seasons, usually during flash flooding.
