= Bilala people =

Bilala
Total population
- c. 205,000 (2018)

Regions with significant populations
- Lake Fitri (Chad)

Languages
- Naba

Religion
- Islam

The Bilala, also called Bulala or Boulala, are an ethnic group that mainly lives around Lake Fitri in the Batha region, central Chad. Most of the Bilala population are agricultural farmers and Muslims. The Bilala numbered around 205,000 in 2018.

The traditional capital of the Bilala is the town of Yao, which served as the seat of a small and independent Bilala-ruled sultanate in the 17th–20th centuries. The sultan of Yao remains the traditional leader of the Bilala people. Prior to the 17th century, the Bilala were closely associated with the history of the Kanem–Bornu Empire; in the 14th century, the Bilala captured Kanem (modern-day southwestern Chad) from that empire and ruled a kingdom there until they were driven away to their modern homeland.

== Name ==
The Bilala call themselves Balala. The common renditions Bilala, Bulala, and Boulala originate as foreign versions of this name. Boulala, a French rendition, is common in modern-day Francophone Chad. Other exonyms have sometimes been applied to the Bilala. The Bagirmi people call the Bilala Lis or Lisi and their rulers the Biyo Bulala. In Bornu (modern-day northeastern Nigeria), the Bilala are called the Kayi Bulala.

== Early history ==
=== Origin ===
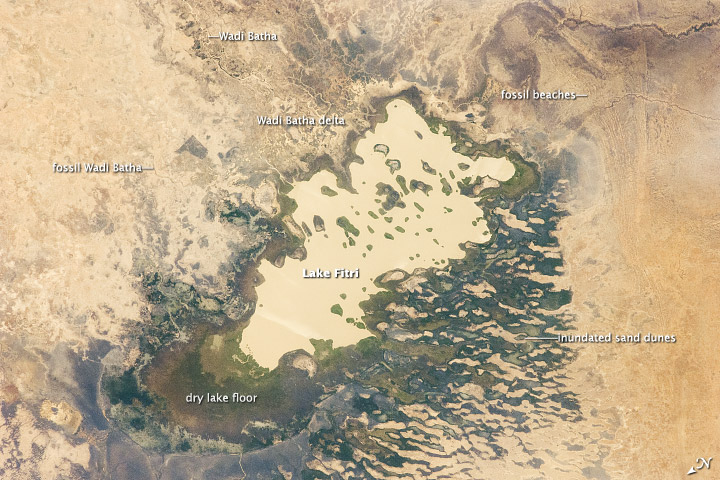
Satellite map of Lake Fitri, the lands around which are the present-day homeland of the Bilala. It is unclear if Lake Fitri is the original homeland of the Bilala.

Much of the history of the Bilala is largely conjectural. The Bilala are first recorded in the 14th century as rivals of the Sayfawa dynasty, the rulers of the Kanem–Bornu Empire. The available source material leaves the origin of the Bilala and the reasons for the conflict unclear.

The modern-day Bilala people are a composite population, with a vaguely remembered oral tradition claiming Yemenite origin, similar to origin stories of the Sayfawa dynasty. Their name is sometimes connected to an eponymous ancestor figure named Bilal or Balal. Arabising legends cast Bilal as an early African convert to Islam and perhaps an early companion of the prophet. Bilal's descendants are said to have "mixed with the Arabs". Bilal has alternatively been interpreted as a local Kanembu figure, who organised a force to oppose the rule of the Sayfawa. A contradictory tradition names the Yemenite ancestor as Muhammad al-Kabir al-Yamani, who was invested as a king by the prophet and who lived for two hundred years. Al-Yamani is said to have attempted to convert populations around the Red Sea and various other locations to Islam before he settled in modern-day Chad.

Oral histories collected in northeastern Nigeria and southwestern Chad in the 19th and early 20th centuries, published by Heinrich Barth and Palmer, claim that the Bilala were related to the Sayfawa. Barth claimed that the Bilala rulers were descendants of the 13th-century Sayfawa mai Dunama II Dibalemi. Palmer considered this improbable and instead made the case that they were descended from mai Bulu, Kanem's legendary eighth mai. Later scholars have variously disputed and supported the idea of kinship between the Bilala and Sayfawa. According to some traditional accounts, the first ruler of the Bilala was Jil Sukumami (or Djil Sjikomeni), who Barth claimed was a son of Dunama II. Palmer placed Jil later than Barth, as a mid- to late 14th-century contemporary of the Sayfawa mais Idris I Nikalemi and Dawud Nikalemi. The Bilala ruler contemporary Dawud is in various accounts alternatively referred to as Bilala (i.e. another eponymous ancestor), Lefia, or Muhammad Bilalama.

It is unclear if the lands around Lake Fitri are the original homeland of the Bilala, or even whether the Bilala lived there before their association with Kanem. Several authors have considered this probable, including Gustav Nachtigal and Dierk Lange. Lange suggested that the Bilala were originally a pastoral people who lived around the lake. Richmond Palmer believed that the Bilala were entrusted with the lands around Lake Fitri by the Sayfawa rulers, perhaps in the 14th century.

=== Conflict with the Sayfawa ===
Conflict between the Bilala and the Sayfawa erupted in the 14th century; according to the girgam (the royal chronicle of the Kanem–Bornu Empire), the Bilala defeated and killed the Sayfawa mai Dawud at this time. The Bilala were allied with the Toubou people during their conflicts with the Sayfawa.

Writing around 1400, the Egyptian historian al-Maqrizi connects the conflict between the Bilala and the Sayfawa to the Bilala resisting Islam: "the people of Kanem revolted against them [i.e. the Sayfawa rulers] and renounced the faith. Bornu remained in their empire. Its inhabitants are Muslims and wage holy wars against the people of Kanem." No native sources corroborate the claim that the Bilala were pagans, a claim that does not appear in either the girgam (the Kanem–Bornu Empire's royal chronicle) or the 16th-century writings of Ibn Furtu. The idea that the Bilala were traditionalists alienated by increasing Islamisation in Kanem has nevertheless been supported by scholars such as Eduoard Conte (1991) and Timothy Insoll (2003).

According to the girgam, the Bilala defeated and killed Dawud's immediate successors Uthman I, Uthman II, and Abubakar Liyatu. The incursion of the Bilala into Kanem and their ability to inflict frequent defeats on the Sayfawa may have been possible due to civil wars between the descendants of Idris I and Dawud. In the late 14th century, the Bilala captured the Sayfawa capital of Njimi and ousted the Sayfawa from power in Kanem. The Sayfawa relocated their base of power to Bornu (modern-day northeastern Nigeria), west of Lake Chad, hence their state often being referred to as Kanem–Bornu.

== Bilala kingdoms ==
=== Kanem/Gaoga (14th–17th century) ===
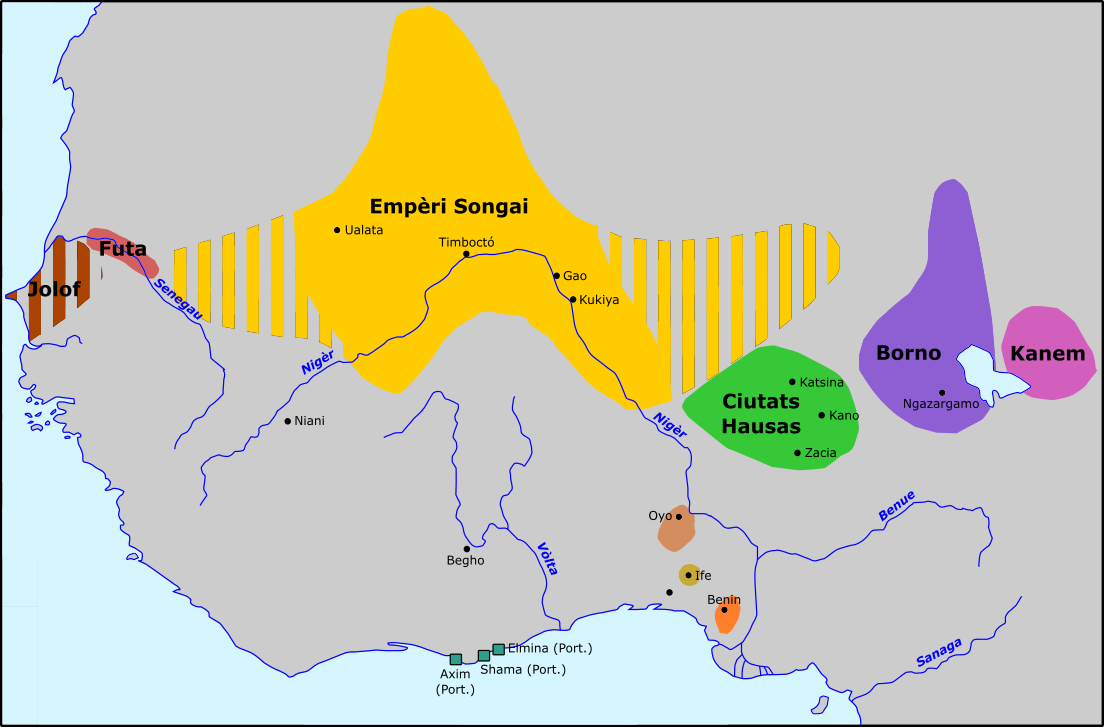
West Africa in the 15th century, with Kanem (under the Bilala) and Borno (the Kanem–Bornu Empire) shown as separate states

After their conquest of Kanem, the leaders of the Bilala declared themselves sultans. The situation in Kanem under the Bilala is largely unknown, but it is clear that they established a powerful and effective kingdom, with an aristocracy. The new Bilala kingdom posed a serious political alternative to the Safawa in the region around Lake Chad. By the late 15th century, the Bilala kingdom might have been larger and more powerful than the kingdom ruled by the Sayfawa in Bornu. Mamluk (Egyptian) chancery manuals from this time accord the Bilala the same diplomatic status as the Sayfawa and the Bilala rulers are said to have enjoyed good relations with the Abbasid caliph in Egypt.

Leo Africanus, writing in the 16th century, referred to the Bilala kingdom as "Gaoga". According to Leo Africanus, all the kingdoms of the Sudan region were subject to only three rulers: the king of "Tombuto" (=Timbuktu, i.e. the Songhai Empire), who ruled the largest domain, the king of Bornu (i.e. the Sayfawa rulers), and the king of "Gaoga", who ruled "the rest".

The Sayfawa attempted to retake Kanem throughout the 15th and 16th centuries. They were unsuccessful until mai Idris III Katagarmabe captured Kanem in the early 16th century, more than a century after the Sayfawa lost the region. Idris Katagarmabe chose to let the Bilala continue to govern Kanem as a province. After Idris Katagarmabe's time, the Bilala rose in rebellion against the empire several times. They were not decisively suppressed by the Sayfawa until the reign of mai Idris IV Alooma in the second half of the 16th century. Tradition claims that Idris Alooma's mother was a daughter of the ruler of the Bilala.

In around 1630, the Wadai Sultanate drove the Bilala out of Kanem. The Sayfawa were then forced to fight against Wadai to secure the eastern side of Lake Chad.

=== Sultanate of Yao (17th century–1909) ===
After the loss of Kanem, the Bilala migrated east and re-established themselves in the lands around Lake Fitri. They established a new small sultanate, centered on the town of Yao. The name of the first Bilala ruler in Yao and the reason for settling there varies depending on the source. One origin story claims that a Bilala ruler named Abd al-Jalil al-Kabir invaded Yao when he learned that a local ruler there, Ali Dinar, oppressed his own people. Another account omits this origin story and gives the name of the first Bilala ruler of Yao as Muhammad Jalil Essa Tubo.

In the late 19th century, the Bilala territories became engulfed in civil war between the brothers Hassan Bekuma and Muhammad Gadai, rival claimants to the sultanate. Muhammad Gadai lost the war and spent seven years in exile in the Wadai Sultanate. Hassan Bekuma was followed on the throne by his son Jiri, who after just three years on the throne faced a Wadai invasion in Muhammad Gadai's name. Jiri was taken prisoner by the Wadai sultan Yusuf and Muhammad Gadai was installed as the new Bilala ruler. Muhammad Gadai ruled for twelve or thirteen years, and faced internal opposition from the sons of Musa, a previous sultan.

In May 1909, the region around Lake Fitri, including Yao, was occupied and colonised by France. Muhammad Gadai died in battle against the French at a site called Mulabis. He was succeeded as sultan by Hassan Absakin, a descendant of an earlier sultan. The French deprived Hassan Absakin of nearly all political power.

== Society ==
Bilala society and its organisation has changed very little under colonial occupation and has continued within the modern Republic of Chad. Yao is still considered the capital of the Bilala, and is still the seat of the sultan of Yao, their traditional leader.

In the mid-1950s, the Bilala were estimated to number only around 35,000. Through assimilation with other clans, they numbered around 205,000 in 2018. The Bilala are centered around Lake Fitri, where they live in an area roughly 5,000 km^{2} in size. Some Bilala are also found in Massakory, in the east in Oum Hadjer, and as nomads living among the Daza people. The Bilala are largely Muslim, and educated in Quranic schools, but also retain some pre-Islamic rites and traditions.

The Bilala are mostly agricultural farmers, who raise cotton, millet, and maize. Some also engage in fishing and stockbreeding. Bilala economic activity mostly centers around raising herds and trading with Muslim and Arab neighbors.

== See also ==
- Bilala dynasty – the lineage of traditional rulers (sultans) of the Bilala
