= Fitri Department =

Department of Batha, Chad

Coordinates: 12°51′03″N 17°33′39″E

Fitri (Arabic: فيتري) is one of the three departments which make up the region of Batha in Chad. The capital is Yao.

== See also ==
- Departments of Chad
