= Ouaddaï highlands =

Highland area in Chad along the border with Sudan

The Ouaddaï Highlands are an area in eastern Chad along the border with Sudan. The Ennedi Plateau and the Ouaddaï Highlands complete the image of a gradually sloping basin which descends towards Lake Chad. There are also central highlands in the Guéra region rising to 1,500 m (4,921 ft). The Ouaddaï Highlands mark Chad's eastern border and also divide the Chad and Nile watersheds. These highland areas are part of the East Saharan montane xeric woodlands ecoregion.

== Water systems ==
The Batha River is an important ephemeral river that carries water west from these highlands during rainy seasons, usually during flash flooding.

== Yellow Nile ==
The Yellow Nile is a former tributary that connected the Ouaddaï Highlands to the Nile River Valley c. 8000 to c. 1000 BCE. Its remains are known as the Wadi Howar. The wadi passes through West Darfur near the northern border with Chad and meets up with the Nile near the southern point of the Great Bend.

== Ouaddai Empire ==
The Ouaddai Empire (1635–1912) (also Wadai Empire) was originally a non-Muslim kingdom, located to the east of Lake Chad in present-day Chad. It emerged in the sixteenth century as an offshoot of the Sultanate of Darfur (in present-day Sudan) to the northeast of the Kingdom of Baguirmi.

== See also ==
- Geography of Chad
- Ouaddaï (region)
