= East Saharan montane xeric woodlands =

Desert ecoregion in Africa

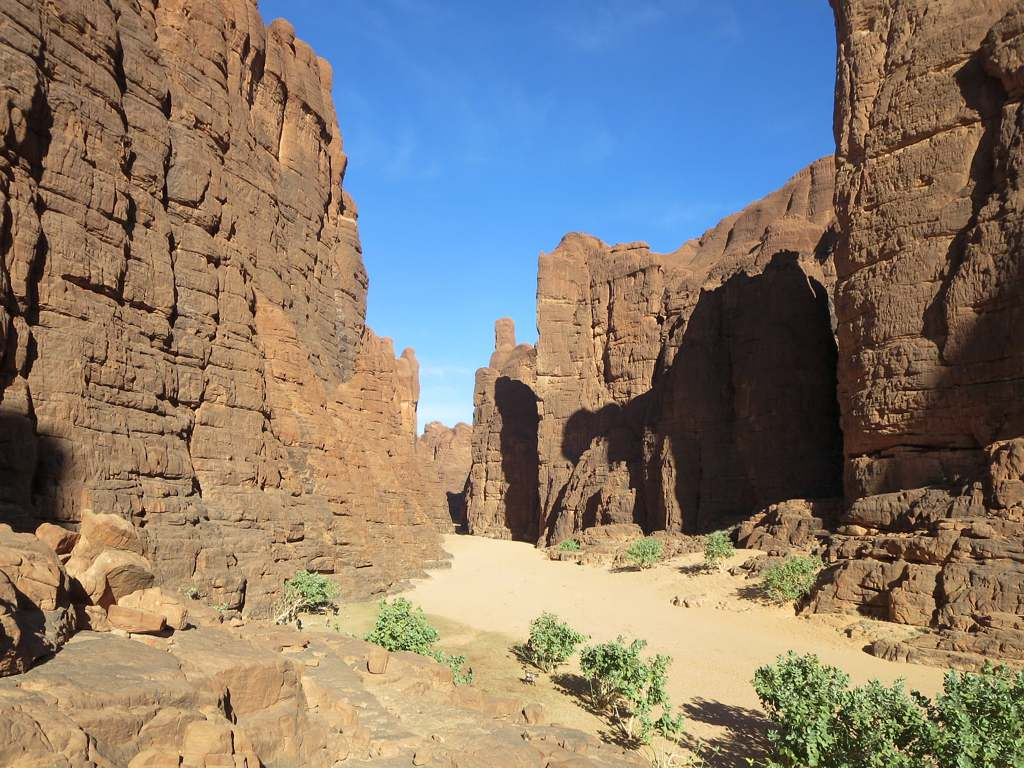
- Canyon in the Ennedi Plateau

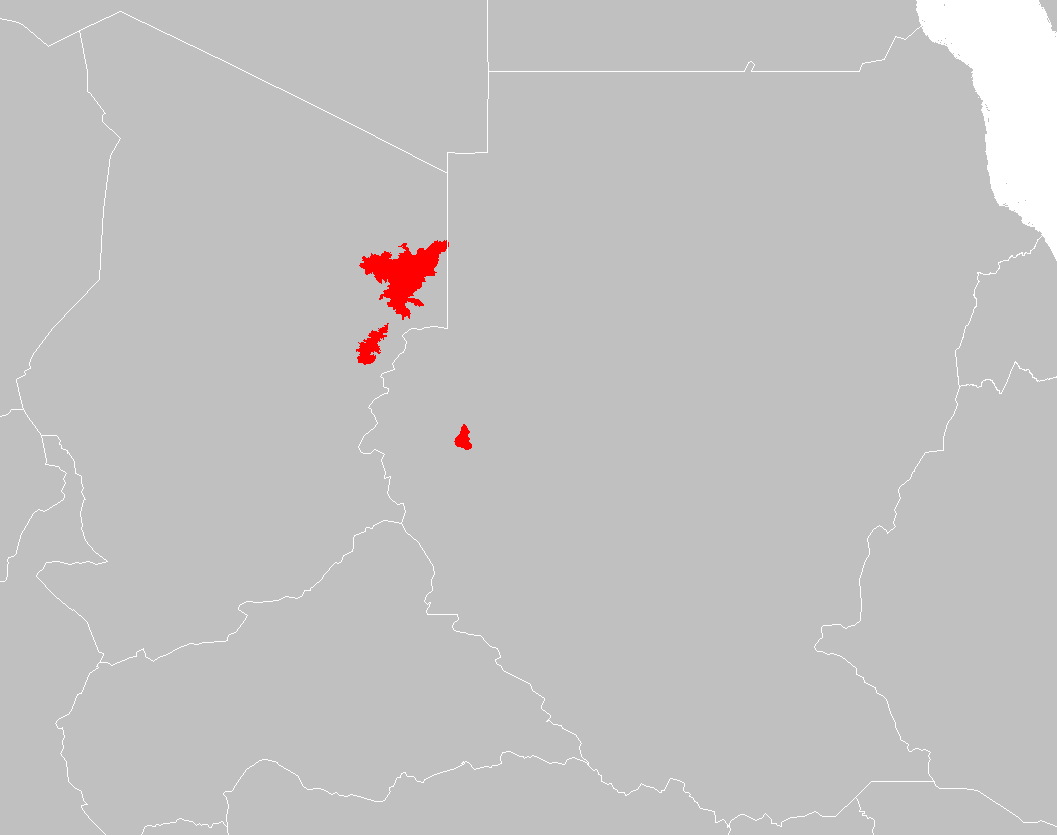
- Location of the ecoregion

Ecology
- Realm: Afrotropical
- Biome: deserts and xeric shrublands
- Borders: Sahelian Acacia savanna

Geography
- Area: 27,776 km^{2} (10,724 sq mi)
- Countries: Chad; Sudan

Conservation
- Conservation status: Critical/endangered
- Protected: 0 km^{2} (0%)

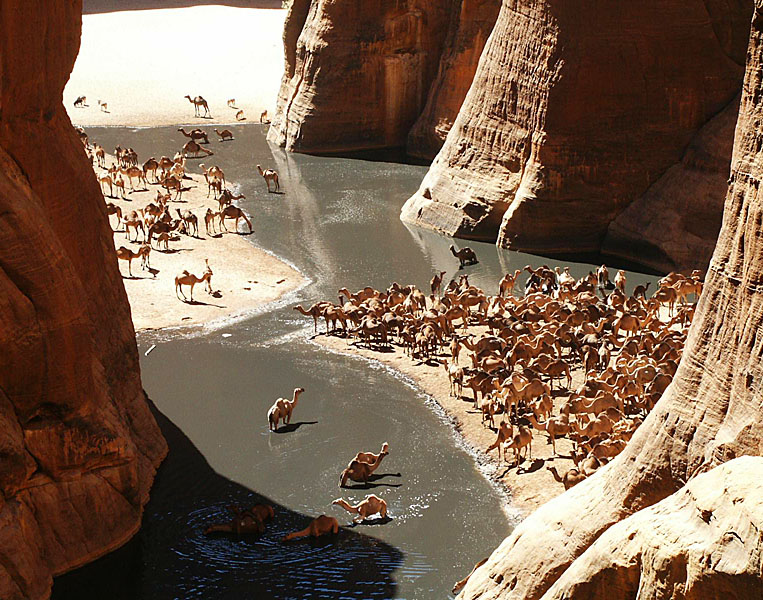
East Saharan montane xeric woodlands.

The East Saharan montane xeric woodlands is an ecoregion of central Africa, a number of high mountains in the middle of the huge area of savanna on the edge of the Sahara Desert.

== Location and description ==
The ecoregion covers the higher elevations of the Ennedi Plateau and the Ouaddaï Highlands of eastern Chad and the extinct volcano system Jebel Marra in Darfur, western Sudan. These mountain ranges rise above the semi-desert sahelian Acacia savanna at the southern edge of the Sahara Desert. The ecoregion covers an area of 27,900 square kilometers (10,800 sq mi). The summer rains are irregular, even more so in Chad than on Jebel Marra, which has two crater lakes.

== Flora ==
Plant life includes many species typical of the sahel belt including Ammania gracilis, the grass Panicum laetum, the forb Chrozophora brocchiana and the herbs Farsetia stenoptera, Indigofera senegalensis and Tephrosia gracilipes. One classic element of the natural flora was Laperrine's Olive (Olea europaea laperrinei).

== Fauna ==
Water from mountain streams makes the area an important habitat for wildlife such as a number of threatened antelope species such as addax (Addax nasomaculatus), Dama gazelle (Gazella dama), Dorcas gazelle (Gazella dorcas) and Red-fronted gazelle (Gazella rufifrons). Endemic species include the Arid Thicket Rat (Grammomys aridulus) from Jebel Marra. The mountains are home to birds of both Eurasia and Africa, species include Nubian bustard (Neotis nuba) and Cinereous Vulture (Aegypius monachus).

== Threats and preservation ==
Jebel Marra has been inhabited since antiquity and although the steep mountain valley areas are mainly uninhabited and undisturbed, habitat on the more accessible slopes has been affected. In Chad the ecoregion is thinly populated, mainly by nomadic pastoralists. Recent conflict in both Chad and Darfur have meant that less agriculture is taking place and to an extent original flora is reestablishing.

== See also ==
- West Saharan montane xeric woodlands
