= Muhammad II Manza =

Mai of the Kanem–Bornu Empire
- Reign: 14th century (1 year) c. 1388–1389 (Note: Specific regnal years of rulers of the Kanem–Bornu Empire are calculated by backdating from known events using their regnal lengths and vary between sources. The lists of Nachtigal and Landeroin agreed that Muhammad ruled for just a year. Nachtigal dated his reign to 1426–1427 and Landeroin dated it to 1397–1398. Muhammad was omitted by several later authors as well, including Lange (1984) and Stewart (1989). Bosworth (2012) dated his reign to 1388–1389.)
- Predecessor: Saʽid
- Successor: Kade II Afunu
- Died: c. 1389
- Dynasty: Sayfawa dynasty (Idrisid (Note: The 14th and 15th centuries saw protracted civil wars between the rival Idrisid (descendants of Idris I Nikalemi) and Dawudid (descendants of Dawud Nikalemi) branches of the Sayfawa dynasty.))
- Father: Idris I Nikalemi

Muhammad II (Muḥammad bin Idrīs), called Muhammad Manza, was briefly mai (ruler) of the Kanem–Bornu Empire in the late 14th century, ruling approximately 1388–1389. Muhammad ruled during the "Era of Instability", a chaotic period of internal and external conflict in the empire.

== Life ==
Muhammad was a son of mai Idris I Nikalemi. Muhammad succeeded his brother Saʽid as mai in the late 14th century.

Muhammad is poorly recorded in the sources and is omitted in most of the Kanem–Bornu regnal lists (girgams) and chronicles translated in the 19th–20th centuries. He is recorded in the lists of Gustav Nachtigal (1881) and Moïse Landeroin (1911), both of whom assign him a reign of just one year. Muhammad is also listed in a girgam translated by Richmond Palmer in 1912, though this girgam exhibits a confused chronology and sequence of names. Muhammad was omitted in later lists produced by Palmer. Palmer's 1912 girgam refers to him as Muhammad Manza, with Palmer noting that Manza was "an uncomplimentary nickname given to avert the evil eye."

Muhammad was succeeded as mai by his brother Kade II Afunu. According to Palmer's 1912 girgam, Muhammad was buried at "Jaburu of many dom and fan palms".
