= Lake Fitri =

Lake in Chad

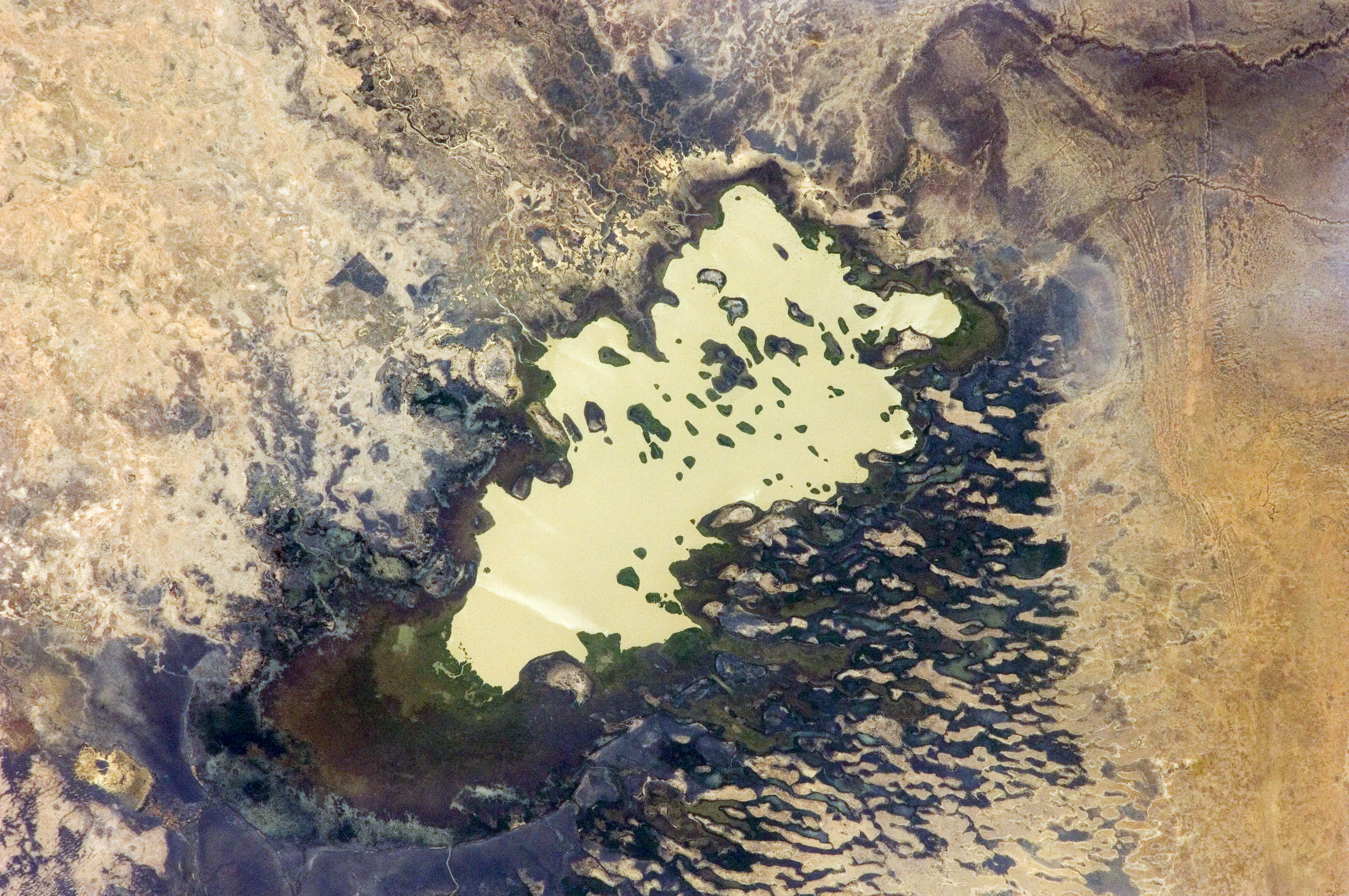

- Location within Chad Location within Africa
- Coordinates: 12°48′33″N 17°30′9″E
- Primary inflows: Batha River
- Catchment area: 70,000 km^{2} (27,000 sq mi)
- Basin countries: Chad
- Surface area: 500 km^{2} (190 sq mi)

Ramsar Wetland
- Official name: Lac Fitri
- Designated: 13 June 1990
- Reference no.: 486

Lake Fitri is a shallow freshwater lake in central Chad, located in the Sahel region about 300 km east of N’Djamena. It has been designated a Wetland of International Importance under the Ramsar Convention.

== Geography ==
The normal size of the lake is about 50,000 ha (120,000 acres), though this can triple in wetter years. It is fed by seasonal rainfall and run-off from a catchment area estimated at 70,000 km^{2} (27,000 sq mi). The principal river feed is the seasonal Batha River which carries water from the Ouaddai massif to the west. Similarly to Chad's other lake, Lake Chad, it is not as large as it once was. The normally permanent lake may dry out during severe drought periods, such as occurred at the beginning of the twentieth century and again in 1984–1985.

=== Important Bird Area ===
The lake has been designated an Important Bird Area (IBA) by BirdLife International because it supports significant populations of white-faced and fulvous whistling-ducks, ferruginous ducks, garganeys, northern pintails, black crowned cranes, African spoonbills and squacco herons.

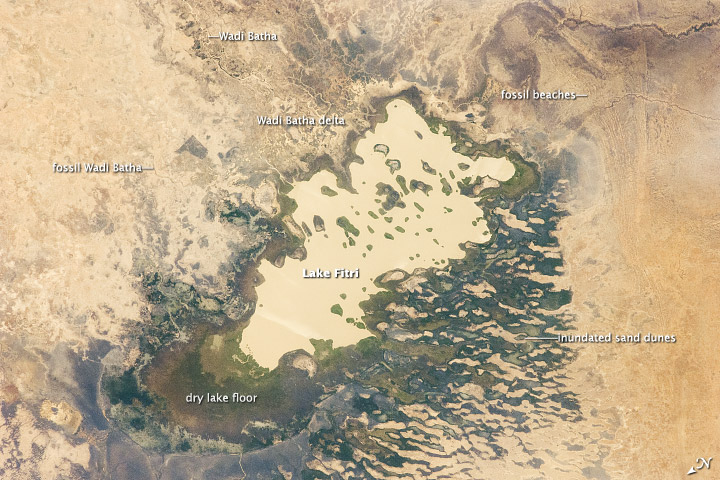
Lake Fitri
