= Njimi =

Capital of the Kanem–Bornu Empire until the 14th century

Birni Njimi, (Note: Birni means city, especially in the context of a capital city.) also called N'Jimi, N'jimi, and Anjimi, was the capital of the Kanem–Bornu Empire until the 14th century. Njimi is first recorded in texts from the 12th century but was probably the empire's original capital, perhaps established as early as the 8th century. Njimi was located in the Kanem region in modern-day Chad, east of Lake Chad, but its precise location has yet to be securely identified.

== History ==
The early history of Njimi is unknown. Towns in Kanem are first mentioned in external sources in the 12th century, when al-Idrisi records the two towns of Njimi and Manan. Al-Idrisi suggests that Manan was the seat of the ruler (mai), whereas Njimi was a smaller town further south. It is however clear from other sources that Njimi was, at least later on, Kanem's capital.

Njimi is generally considered to have been the Kanem–Bornu Empire's original capital, perhaps having served as such since the state's foundation in the 8th century. It has alternatively been suggested that Manan was the original capital before a shift to Njimi, or that early Kanem was nomadic and lacked a permanent capital before Njimi came to serve that role in around al-Idrisi's time. Njimi was likely located at a strategic location along the trans-Saharan trade routes.

Njimi, and the entire Kanem region, was captured by the Bilala in the 14th century and mai Umar I Idrismi moved the imperial center to the region of Bornu, west of Lake Chad. Njimi and Kanem were reconquered in the early 16th century, but the imperial center continued to be situated in Bornu, where the new capital Ngazargamu had been built. Njimi was still a prominent location until at least the 16th century, though its old medieval buildings had been abandoned by that point.

== Identification ==
From historical sources and context, Njimi is known to have been located in the Kanem region, east of Lake Chad. Beyond the general geographical region, the site of Njimi has never been satisfactorily located, despite attempts to find it stretching back to the mid-18th century.

The Kanem area has only been subject to limited archaeological surveys, which might explain why the city remains lost. It is alternatively possible that Njimi was built largely of impermanent materials. The city has been suggested to have been a "city of tents", based on Kanem's early history as a pastoralist society and modern Kanuri buildings often being roundhouses with mud or wooden framework walls.

Archaeological investigations in Kanem have yielded little evidence, such as undated buildings and enclosures between Moussoro, the Chadian Bahr al-Ghazal, and Mao, as well as the ruins of a possible mosque at Tié. These structures have historically been considered to "in no way fulfil the requirements of the capital of Njimi". In 2019, Carlos Magnavita, Zakinet Dangbet, and Tchago Bouimon suggested that Tié could tentatively be identified as the site of Njimi, pointing to the presence of fire bricks at the site (suggesting it having been constructed by the elite) and to etymological connections; the site was in the mid-20th century known as Njimi-Ye and Cimi-Ye. The bricks at Tié are however yet to be dated. In 2024, Rémi Dewière supported Tié's identification with Njimi.
