= Dawud Nikalemi =

Mai of the Kanem–Bornu Empire
- Reign: 14th century (10–13 years) c. 1353–1363 (Note: King lists (girgams) and chronicles translated in the 19th–20th centuries assign Dawud a reign of 10 years (Barth, Palmer) or 13 years (Urvoy, Landeroin). He is omitted in the list of Nachtigal. Due to this and to differing dates and calculations for other mais, various dates have been given for his reign, including 1377–1386 (Barth), 1376–1386 (Palmer), 1353–1366 (Urvoy), and 1325–1338 (Landeroin). Cohen (1966) considered a reign of 10 years most likely. Lange (1984) dated Dawud's reign to 1366–1376, Stewart (1989) dated it to 1377–1386, and Bosworth (2012) dated it to 1353–1363.)
- Predecessor: Idris I Nikalemi
- Successor: Uthman I
- Died: c. 1363 "Mélfala", near Lake Fitri
- Issue: Uthman I Abubakar Liyatu; Uthman III Kalinumuwa; Haritso; Idris II Saradima (?); Ibrahim
- Dynasty: Sayfawa dynasty (Dawudid)
- Father: Ibrahim I Nikale
- Mother: Fatima

Dawud (Dāwūd bin Ibrāhīm Nikale), called Dawud Nikalemi (Note: Also spelled Nigalemi.) and Dawud Fatimami, was mai (ruler) of the Kanem–Bornu Empire in the mid-14th century, ruling approximately 1353–1363. Dawud was the first mai to fight against the Bilala, who would remain enemies of the empire for centuries. He was the progenitor of the Dawudid line of the Sayfawa dynasty, which competed for the throne with the rival Idrisid line (descendants of his brother and predecessor Idris I Nikalemi) in the century following his death.

== Life ==
Dawud was a son of mai Ibrahim I Nikale. His mother was named Fatima, daughter of Nâsamu. Dawud succeeded his half-brother Idris I Nikalemi as mai in the mid-14th century. Dawud became mai over many sons of Idris, which provoked resentment and eventually a civil war over the succession. Although Dawud maintained his hold on the throne for about a decade, the civil war weakened the armies of the empire and the Sayfawa dynasty was divided into the Idrisid (descendants of Idris) and Dawudid (descendants of Dawud) branches, which would compete over the throne for the next century. Dawud may also have faced one or more of his own sons in a civil war, as descendants of exiled sons of Dawud were later encountered among the "Ghammúwa" by the 16th-century mai Idris IV Alooma in his military campaigns.

With his armies weakened, Dawud was unable to counter an invasion of the empire by the Bilala from the east. Dawud was the first mai to fight against the Bilala. The invasion marked the beginning of a destructive conflict between the Sayfawa and the Bilala, which would last for centuries. The Bilala defeated Dawud in battle and temporarily captured Njimi, the imperial capital. Dawud was not able to retake the capital and was killed by the Bilala ruler Abd al-Jalil at a site identified as Mélfala, located in the lands surrounding Lake Fitri. He was succeeded as mai by his son Uthman I.
