= Idris I Nikalemi =

Mai of the Kanem–Bornu Empire
- Reign: 14th century (24–25 years) c. 1329–1353 (Note: King lists (girgams) and chronicles translated in the 19th–20th centuries assign Idris a reign of 24 years (Nachtigal) or 25 years (Barth, Palmer, Urvoy, Landeroin). Due to differing dates and calculations for other mais, various dates have been given for his reign, including 1353–1376 (Barth, Palmer), 1328–1353 (Urvoy), 1372–1397 (Landeroin), and 1402–1426 (Nachtigal). Cohen (1966) considered a reign of 25 years most likely. Lange (1984) dated Idris's reign to 1342–1366, Stewart (1989) dated it to 1353–1377, and Bosworth (2012) dated it to 1329–1353.)
- Predecessor: Muhammad I Kure
- Successor: Dawud Nikalemi
- Died: c. 1353; Njimi, Kanem or Damasak, Bornu
- Spouse: Famafa
- Issue: Uthman II; Umar I Idrismi; Saʽid; Muhammad II Manza; Kade II Afunu; Biri III Uthman
- Dynasty: Sayfawa dynasty (Idrisid)
- Father: Ibrahim I Nikale
- Mother: Hafsa

al-Ḥājj Idris I (Idrīs bin Ibrāhīm Nikale), called Idris Nikalemi (Note: Also spelled Nigalemi.) and Idris Hafsami, was mai (ruler) of the Kanem–Bornu Empire in the early-to-mid 14th century, ruling approximately 1329–1353. Idris was the progenitor of the Idrisid line of the Sayfawa dynasty, which competed for the throne with the rival Dawudid line (descendants of his brother and successor Dawud Nikalemi) in the century following his death.

== Life ==
Idris was a son of mai Ibrahim I Nikale. His mother was named Hafsa, daughter of Nâsamu. Idris succeeded Muhammad I Kure as mai in the early 14th century. Muhammad and three of his brothers who reigned before him (Selema III, Kure I Gana, and Kure II Kura) had been killed in quick succession in wars against the Sao of Bornu. The Sao lived south of Lake Chad and had been greatly reduced, but not completely subjugated or wiped out, under earlier mais and had risen up against the empire in Selema's reign. The deaths of Muhammad and his brothers extinguished the line of mai Abdullah II Kademi, which enabled Idris's rise to the throne.

Idris ruled for 24 or 25 years, a significantly longer time than his direct predecessors, but it is unknown if he was more successful against the Sao as little is recorded of his reign overall. Idris at some point made a pilgrimage to Mecca, and is therefore also called al-Ḥājj Idris.

According to later tradition, Idris died at Njimi, the imperial capital. A contradictory tradition instead places his death at Damasak, which in Idris's time was a major Sao stronghold. Damasak is considered the more reliable account. If Idris died at Damasak, he might have died on a military campaign against the Sao. Idris was succeeded as mai by his half-brother Dawud Nikalemi. Dawud became mai over several sons of Idris, which led to civil war. The succession conflict resulted in the division of the Sayfawa dynasty into the rival Idrisid and Dawudid branches, who competed over the throne for the next century.
