= Yves Urvoy =

French historian

Yves-François-Marie-Aimé Urvoy (20 January 1900 – August 1944) was a French army officer and historian whose work has focused on French colonial holdings in Africa.

== Background ==
Urvoy was born to a family of lower-middle class French-Algerian settlers on 20 January 1900 in Orléansville, Algeria. Relocating to metropolitan France in 1906, the family settled in Paimpol. Urvoy attended the Lycée General David d'Angers, and then École régionale des beaux-arts d'Angers, before undertaking a second art degree at the Central Academy and the St Louis school. Urvoy trained at the Manufacture nationale de Sèvres from 1918 to 1920 but upon completion of his training, decided to instead pursue a career in the military.

After the occupation of France during World War II, Urvoy collaborated with the Vichy regime. He was assassinated by resistance members in 1944.

== Works ==
- Petit atlas ethno-démographique du Soudan, entre Sénégal et Tchad- Larose (1942)
- Les bassins du Niger : étude de géographie physique et de paléogéographie Larose (1942)
- Histoire des populations du Soudan central colonie du Niger- Larose (1936)
- Renaître Essais avec François Perroux-Éditions de la Renaissance européenne (1943)
- Le Syndicalisme base d'une organisation communautaire économique dans le monde de demain
- La Révolution du XX^{e} siècle et la France, Presses universitaires de France (1942)
- Chronique d’Agadès
