= Gustav Nachtigal =

German explorer of Central and West Africa (1834–1885)

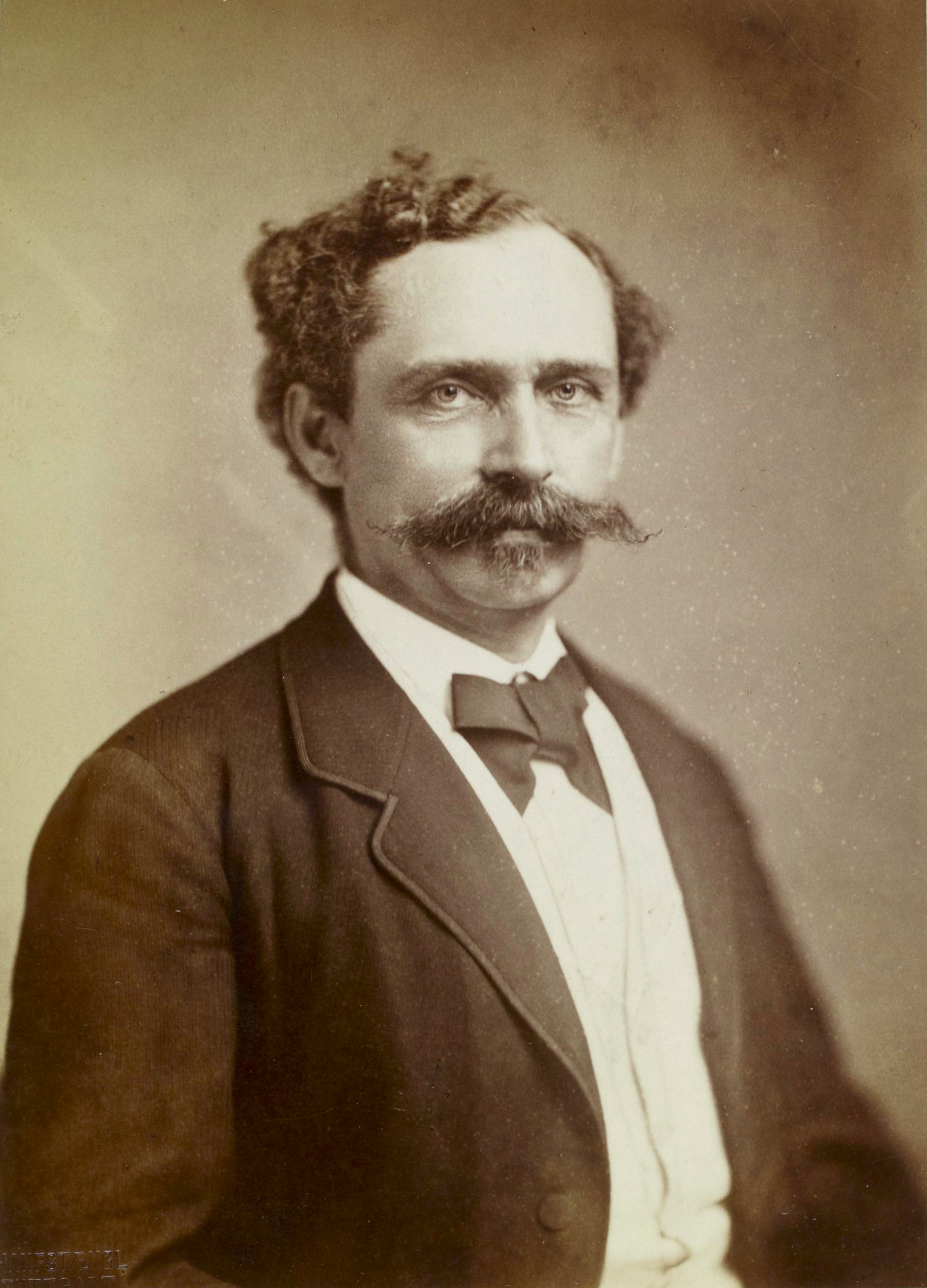
- Born: 23 February 1834; Eichstedt, Kingdom of Prussia
- Died: 20 April 1885 (aged 51) at sea off Cape Palmas, West Africa
- Occupations: Military surgeon Commissioner for West Africa; Consul-general for the German Empire
- Known for: German explorer of Africa

Reichskommissar of German South West Africa
- In office 7 October 1884 – 20 April 1885
- Monarch: Wilhelm I
- Chancellor: Otto von Bismarck
- Secretary of State for Foreign Affairs: Paul von Hatzfeldt
- Preceded by: Adolf Lüderitz (as Magistrat of German South West Africa)
- Succeeded by: Heinrich Ernst Göring (as acting)

Gustav Nachtigal (German: [ˈɡʊstaf ˈnaxtɪɡal]; born 23 February 1834 – 20 April 1885) was a German military surgeon and explorer of Central and West Africa. He is also known as the German Empire's consul-general for Tunisia and Commissioner for West Africa. His mission as commissioner resulted in Togoland and Kamerun becoming the first colonies of a German colonial empire.

== Early life and education ==
Gustav Nachtigal, the son of a Lutheran pastor and his wife, was born on 23 February 1834 at Eichstedt in the Prussian province of Saxony-Anhalt. His father died of Phthisis pulmonum (pulmonary tuberculosis) in 1839, when the boy was five.

After early education, Nachtigal studied medicine at the universities of Halle, Würzburg, and Greifswald.

== Career and travels ==
Nachtigal practised for several years as a military surgeon. He worked in Cologne, Germany. Nachtigal contracted a lung disease and relocated to Annaba in Algeria in October, 1862. He travelled to Tunis in 1863, where he studied Arabic. He later took part as surgeon in several expeditions into Central Africa between 1869 and 1875.

He returned to Germany and met Friedrich Gerhard Rohlfs. Rohlfs asked him to go to the Bornu Empire. He was commissioned by King Wilhelm I of Prussia to carry gifts to Umar Kura, ruler of the Bornu Empire, in acknowledgment of kindness shown to German travellers, such as Heinrich Barth.

Nachtigal set out in 1869 from Ottoman Tripoli and accomplished his mission after a two years' journey. During this period, he visited Tibesti and Borku, regions of the central Sahara not previously known to Europeans, and reached the region of the Toubou people. He travelled with eight camels and six men.

From Bornu, he travelled to Baguirmi, an independent state to the southeast of Bornu. From there, he proceeded to Wadai (a powerful Muslim kingdom to the northeast of Baguirmi) and to Kordofan (a former province of central Sudan).

Nachtigal finally emerged from his journey through the Sahel at Khartoum (then the centre of Turkish-Egyptian Sudan) in the winter of 1874, after having been given up as lost. His journey, described in his Sahara and Sudan, earned him a reputation as a discoverer. In 1882, he was awarded the Royal Geographical Society's Founder's Medal.

After the establishment of a French protectorate over Tunisia, Nachtigal was sent as consul-general for the German Empire and served there until 1884. Thereafter, he was appointed by Chancellor Otto von Bismarck as special commissioner for West Africa. Local German business interests in that region began advocating for protection by the German Empire, after they had acquired huge properties in West Africa. Nachtigal’s task was to establish a claim for Germany, before the British could advance their own interests. He established Togoland and Kamerun as Germany’s first colonial possessions.

On his return, he died at sea aboard the gunboat Möwe off Cape Palmas on 20 April 1885. He was initially interred at Grand Bassam (now in Ivory Coast). In 1888 Nachtigal’s remains were exhumed and reburied in a ceremonial grave in Duala (then a German protectorate) in front of the Kamerun colonial government building.

== Legacy ==
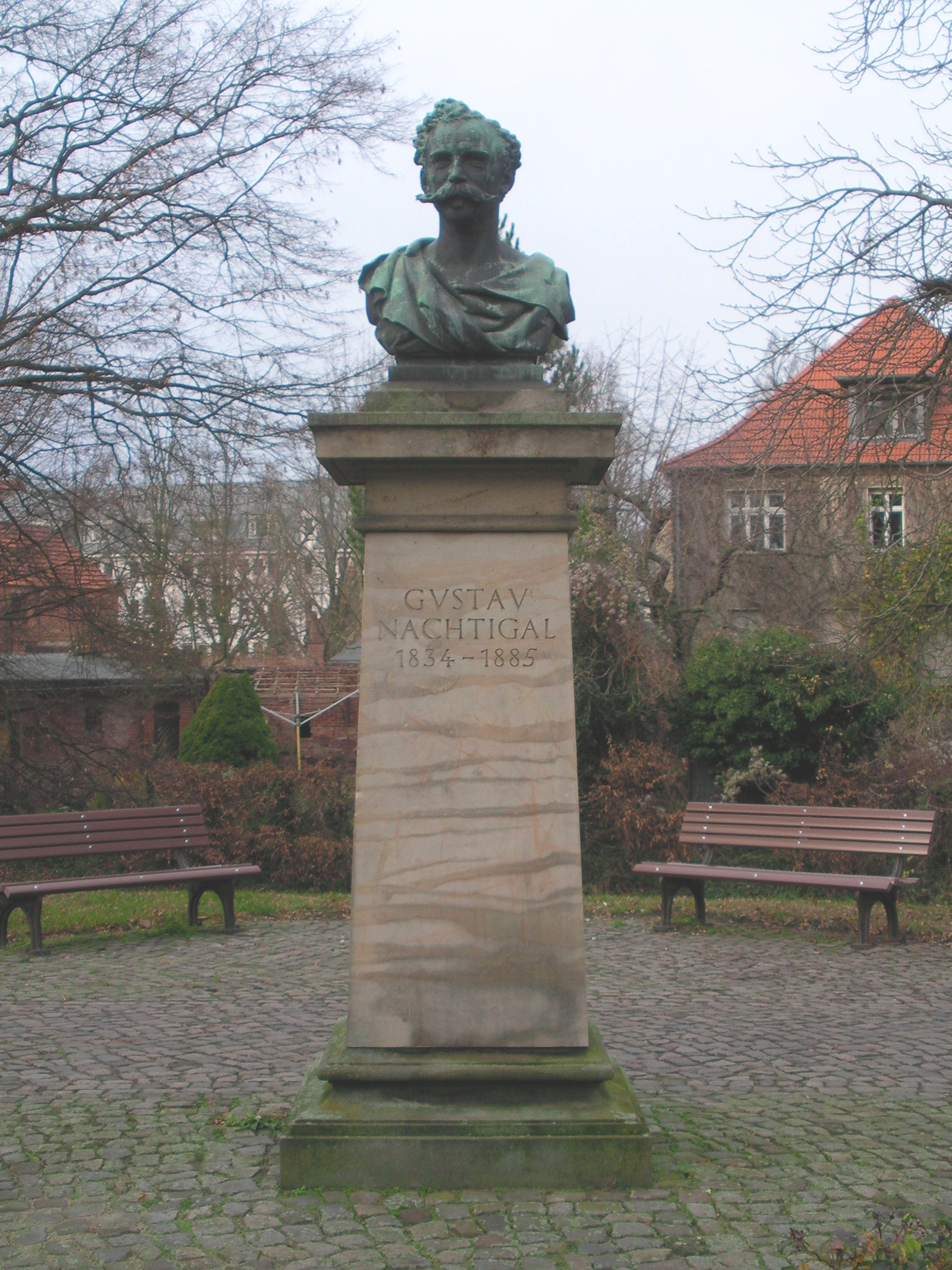
Monument to Gustav Nachtigal in Stendal, Germany

Along with Heinrich Barth, Nachtigal has been regarded as the other important German explorer of Africa. Like Barth, Nachtigal was primarily interested in ethnography, and additionally in tropical medicine. His works stand out because of their wealth of details and because of his unbiased views of Africans. In contrast to most contemporary explorers, Nachtigal did not regard Africans as inferior to Europeans, as is reflected in his descriptions and choice of words.

He had witnessed slave hunts performed by African rulers and the cruelties inflicted by them upon other Africans. The horror that he felt about these atrocities made him enter colonial endeavours, because he believed that European domination of the African continent might stop slave-hunting and slave ownership.

The Gustav Nachtigal Medal, awarded by the Berlin Geographical Society from 1896 until the 1990s, was named in his honour.

In 2022, "Nachtigalplatz" (Nachtigal Square) in Berlin was renamed "Manga-Bell-Platz", in honor of Duala king and resistance leader Rudolf Duala Manga Bell.

== Works ==
Original Publication

- Saharâ und Sûdân. 2 volumes, Berlin 1879-81, volume 3 published by E. Groddeck, Leipzig 1889.

English Translation

- Sahara and Sudan. volume I: Fezzan and Tibesti; volume II: Kawar, Bornu, Kanem, Borku, Ennedi; volume III: The Chad Basin and Bagirmi; volume IV: Wadai and Darfur. Translated from the original German with an Introduction and Notes by Allan G. B. Fisher and H. J. Fisher. London — New York — Berkeley - 1971–1987.

== See also ==
- Mimi of Nachtigal, an extinct language of Chad
