= Bilala dynasty =

The Bilala dynasty is the royal lineage of the traditional leaders of the Bilala people, an ethnic group today concentrated around Lake Fitri in Chad. The Bilala monarchs have historically ruled different territories, and varied in authority and titles used. Lists of Bilala rulers, preserved through oral tradition, are inconsistent and contradictory before the late 19th century.

In the 14th century, the Bilala conquered Kanem, a territory immediately northeast of Lake Chad, from the Sayfawa dynasty of the Kanem–Bornu Empire. Bilala rulers of Kanem are referred to with titles such as mai, emir, and sultan in the sources, titles also applied to Sayfawa monarchs. The Bilala lost Kanem in the 17th century, whereafter they migrated to their present-day lands around Lake Fitri. The traditional capital of the Bilala has since then been the town of Yao. Bilala rulers since the 17th century are thus commonly referred to as the sultans of Yao, though other titles are sometimes also used, such as mai of Fitri or sultan of Fitri.

== Ancestor figures ==
The traditional origin stories of the Bilala rulers are similar, and often connected to, the origin stories or rulers of the Sayfawa dynasty, which ruled the Kanem–Bornu Empire. Like the Sayfawa, the Bilala have from the time of their conversion to Islam onwards claimed fictitious Arab ancestry as a source of prestige. There are various contradictory versions of the origin tale, with different names given to the progenitor of the Bilala dynasty:

- One version claims that the Bilala are descended from an eponymous ancestor figure named Bilal or Balal. Bilal is said to have been an early African convert to Islam, perhaps an early companion of the prophet. Bilal's descendants reportedly "mixed with the Arabs". Another version also features Bilal, but makes him into a local Kanembu figure, who organised a force to oppose the rule of the Sayfawa.
- One version gives the Yemenite ancestor of the Bilala the name Muhammad al-Kabir al-Yamani. Al-Yamani is said to have been invested as a king by the prophet and to have lived for two hundred years. According to this tale, al-Yamani traveled extensively and tried to convert various populations to Islam, including people around the Red Sea, before he settled in modern-day Chad.
- One version claims that the Bilala were descendants of the "sultan of Baghdad" and that they "obtained power in Baghdad" for some time. According to this tale, the Bilala were attacked in Baghdad by Sef (the eponymous ancestor of the Sayfawa) after he had left Yemen; Sef is said to have defeated the Bilala and became sultan of Baghdad. Sef eventually left Baghdad and traveled to "Badinimguro", where he was for 333 years, and then traveled to "N'gibi N'gabulo", where he also was 333 years, before he reached Njimi in Kanem. The Bilala came to Kanem later and the country was divided between them and the Sayfawa.
- One version names the first ruler of the Bilala as Jil Sukumami or Djil Sjikomeni. Heinrich Barth (1857) believed Jil was a son of the Sayfawa mai Dunama II Dibalemi. Richmond Palmer (1936) placed him later, as a contemporary of the 14th-century Sayfawa mais Idris I Nikalemi and Dawud Nikalemi.

== Oral history accounts ==
=== Historical outline ===
A general outline of Bilala history can be produced through both Bilala and foreign sources. The Bilala are first recorded to have been in conflict with the Sayfawa in the reign of the 14th-century Sayfawa mai Dawud Nikalemi. Dawud was defeated and killed by the Bilala c. 1363, (Note: The dates vary between sources. See Dawud Nikalemi's article for other suggested dates for the end of his reign.) and the Bilala were able to capture Njimi, the capital of Kanem. Njimi was retaken by Dawud's successor, Uthman I, but lost again to the Bilala some years later, in the time of the Sayfawa mai Umar I Idrismi, c. 1380. The loss of Kanem prompted the Sayfawa to re-establish themselves west of Lake Chad, in the Bornu region.

The Bilala established their own kingdom in Kanem, which rivaled that of the Sayfawa in Bornu. The Bilala ruled Kanem until they lost the country c. 1630, whereafter they relocated to their present lands around Lake Fitri.

=== Rulers mentioned in Sayfawa girgams ===
The history of the Kanem–Bornu Empire and its rulers is mainly recorded in the girgam, a royal chronicle preserved over the centuries mainly through oral history. Girgams recording the line of the Sayfawa rulers also mention several Bilala rulers, though a complete line of rulers is not recorded. Similar names and details of these rulers are given in girgams translated by Heinrich Barth in 1857 and Richmond Palmer in 1928:

Name (Barth, 1857)	Name (Palmer, 1928)	Sayfawa contemporary	Details
ʿAbd el Jélil	Abd ul Jalil of the seed of Ume (Jilmi) (Note: Ume Jilmi is one of several alternate names sometimes used for the Sayfawa mai Hummay.)	Dawud Nikalemi	Killed Dawud in battle
Mohammed, son of ʿAbd Allah	"The Eanemma"	Gaji	Killed Gaji in battle
Selma or ʿAbd el Jélil	Not mentioned	Ali I Gaji	Barth stated that the contemporary Leo Africanus mistakenly (Note: Barth doubted that ʿOmár was the correct name here since he believed this Bilala ruler to have been the father of the Bilala ruler who was defeated by Idris III Katagarmabe, Ali I Gaji's heir. Idris III's defeated rival was the son of "Selma or ʿAbd el Jélil". Barth also stated that the name ʿOmár is not otherwise known from the sequence of Bilala rulers.) identified this ruler as ʿOmár.
Dunama, son of Selma or ʿAbd el Jélil	Not mentioned	Idris III Katagarmabe	Son of Selma, defeated by Idris III
A'dim, brother of Dunama	Not mentioned)	Idris III Katagarmabe	Took the throne after his brother Dunama's death, defeated by Idris III
Kadé, son of ʿAbd el Jélil and Lifiya	Kadai ibn Lefia	Muhammad VI Aminami	Rose up against Muhammad VI and was defeated
ʿAbd el Jélil, son of Kade	Abd ul Jalil ibn Gumsu	Dunama VI Muhammad; Abdullah IV Dunamami	Son of Kadé, rose up against Dunama VI and was defeated
ʿAbd Allah, son of ʿAbd el Jélil	Not mentioned	Abdullah IV Dunamami; Aissa Koli; Idris IV Alooma	Son of ʿAbd el Jélil, concluded a peace treaty with Idris IV
Mohammed, son of ʿAbd Allah	Not mentioned	Idris IV Alooma	Son of ʿAbd Allah, died after a short reign
ʿAbd el Jélil ben ʿAbd el Jélil	Abd ul Jalil the son of the daughter of Gargar	Idris IV Alooma	Uncle of Mohammed, broke off negotiations with Idris IV and fought a war against him

=== Bilala girgams and histories ===
The Bilala have their own girgam tradition to record the royal line, though the sequence of rulers differs considerably between different versions. Some traditional short histories of specific episodes in Bilala history also record a handful of rulers. Several royal lists and short histories were translated by Richmond Palmer in his Sudanese Memoirs (1928).

==== Histories ====
One of the tales translated by Palmer (in several versions) is The Bilala Secession from the Mais of Kanem, which records the Bilala conquest of Kanem and the decades that followed. Depending on the version, The Bilala Secession records a single Bilala ruler (eponymously named "Bilala" or "Bulala") as conquering Kanem and ruling for a century, or a succession of three rulers:

- Sultan Bilala (or Lefia) of Fitri, who conquered Kanem from the Sayfawa mai Dawud and ruled for 25 years.
- Sultan Sowi, who ruled for 32 years.
- Sultan Yari bin Sowi, who ruled for 19 years and was defeated by the Sayfawa mai "Ali Gaji".

To make the chronology fit, Palmer identified "Ali Gaji" not as the Sayfawa mai otherwise recorded as Ali I Gaji, but as the earlier Sayfawa ruler Gaji, who the Sayfawa girgam contradictorily describes as having been killed by a Bilala ruler named Mohammed. Palmer suggested that Yari and Mohammed were two names for the same ruler, and that both names were later nicknames.

Another tale, The War Between the Bilala and Sayfawa, records Bilala history around the time of the Sayfawa mai Idris IV Alooma. This tale includes a confused account of Sayfawa history; the Sayfawa mais Ali I Gaji (builder of Ngazargamu) and Ali II Zainami (Idris's father) are erroneously equated as the same person and Aissa Koli is erroneously identified as the daughter of Dunama II Dibalemi. The War Between the Bilala and Sayfawa records that Ali married Amsa, daughter of the Bilala ruler Umr (Umar), (Note: Amsa is in some other accounts identified as Amsa Aliram, i.e. "Amsa, daughter of Ali".) who was Idris's mother. Idris eventually becomes ruler of the Sayfawa and later leads a campaign in which he defeats and kills his maternal grandfather Umr, also becoming ruler of the Bilala. After Idris, Mai Kunuma (or Mai Mala Ganami), son of Umr, becomes ruler of the Bilala and the Bilala relocate to the Lake Fitri region.

==== Lists (girgams) ====
In Sudanese Memoirs, Palmer translated three lists of Bilala rulers. These lists included a Bilala girgam, with regnal years and some notes, as well as two name lists of rulers. Palmer titled the two name lists as List of Bilala Mais of Kanem (List A) and Origin of the Bilala Kings of Fitri According to the Manuscript of Sarkin Gulfei (List B). The lists do not differentiate between ancestral figures, Bilala rulers of Kanem, and Bilala rulers of Yao (Fitri).

Bilala girgam	List B	List A
1. Muhammad al-Yamani, the first Bilala ruler, came to the "Bahr Sau" (Note: Bahr Sau was identified by Palmer as "In Bideyat country. East of N'galaka.") and died there.; 2. Salih (12 years); 3. Muhammad al-Wan (24 years); 4. Abdul Jalil al-Kabir (47 years), fought against "Idris of Bornu" (Note: Three rulers of Bornu bore the name Idris: Idris III Katagarmabe, Idris IV Alooma, and Idris V.) and conquered Lake Fitri, first to rule from Yao; 5. Muhammad Alwan (19 years), son of Abdul Jalil al-Kabir; 6. Muhammad Rishad (21 years), son of Muhammad Alwan; 7. Muhammad Adil Saghir (7 years and 6 months), brother of Muhammad Rishad; 8. Muhammad Adil al-Kabir (19 years), son of Muhammad Adil Saghir; 9. Muhammad Beyad (4 years and 4 months), son of Muhammad Adil al-Kabir; 10. Muhammad Umr (30 years), brother of Muhammad Beyad; 11. Muhammad Jeli al-Saghir (3 years), son of Muhammad Umr; 12. Muhammad Abd al-Jalil al-Kabir (5 years), son of Muhammad Jeli al-Saghir; 13. Muhamamd N'gâri (15 years), son of Muhammad Abd al-Jalil al-Kabir; 14. Abdurahman (or Abd ar-Rahman) (25 years), son of Muhammad N'gâri, fought a war against a group of Toubo; 15. Muhammad Sowi (49 years), son of Abdurahman, a just ruler 16. Muhammad Abd al-Jalil al-Kabir (32 years), son of Muhamamd Sowi; 17. Muhammad Abd al-Jalil al-Saghir (47 years), brother of Muhammad Abd al-Jalil al-Kabir, famine and sickness in his reign 18. Muhammad Shawi (29 years), son of Muhammad Abd al-Jalil al-Kabir; 19. Idris (37 years), son of Muhammad Shawi, war with Bagirmi over ivory 20. Muhammad Bekuma al-Kabir (39 years), son of Idris; 21. Jurab al-Fil (40 years), brother of Muhammad Bekuma al-Kabir; 22. Musa (24 years), civil war against his brother Jurab al-Saghir, who fled the country but returned and killed Musa after Musa had ruled 24 years 23. Jurab al-Saghir (38 years), brother of Musa; 24. Hassan Bekuma (7 years), civil war against his brother Gudei, who fled the country to Wadai; 25. Maina Jiri (3 years), brother of Hassan Bekuma, attacked, defeated, and taken prisoner by Yusuf of Wadai; 26. Gudei (13 years), brother of Maina Jiri and Hassan Bekuma, installed by Yusuf of Wadai, faced civil war by Musa's sons, killed by the French; 27. Hassan (20 years), successor of Gudei; 28. Chiroma, son of Hassan, became ruler in 1922	1. Muhammad al-Kabir al-Yamani; 2. Muhammad; 3. Muhammad; 4. Muhammad; 5. Moama Mahmud; 6. Muhammad; 7. Muhammad; 8. Muhammad al-Bulalai, "in whose time the separation occurred" (Note: The separation of the Sayfawa and Bilala realms, i.e. the conquest of Kanem by the Bilala.); 9. Muhammad; 10. Muhammad Tsilin (Al Aswad) "the prosperous" 11. Muhammad; 12. Muhammad; 13. Abd al-Kârim; 14. Abd al-Jalil; 15. Abd al-Jalil; 16. Abdalla Fahanam; 17. Jili (Abd al-Jalil); 18. Muhammad Chiroma; 19. Muhammad Wali, buried at "Seita"; 20. Abdalla (Abdullahi); 21. Muhammad Jurab al-Kabir; 22. Muhammad Abu Sakkin; 23. Sultan Muhammad Jurab; 24. Muhammad Kade	1. Othman ibn Affan; 2. Hakkiyi; 3. Umr; 4. Khuri; 5. Hadar; 6. Tadu; 7. Hari; 8. Kudu or Kiwada; 9. Kunna or Kinâ; 10. Gadig or Gadga; 11. Mai Koma or Mai Gana; 12. Sadiyi or Sadi; 13. Lefia; 14. Gemu or Jimu; 15. Jurab; 16. Abu Sakkin; 17. Baliyi or Baliya; 18. K'ala; 19. Haj Halihan or Haj Jil; 20. Bêhama; 21. Asawa or Asawi; 22. Dahu or Dahi; 23. Lihu or Lihi; 24. Hamr or Umr; 25. Adam; 26. Bikur; 27. Tâdu; 28. Haj Umr; 29. Adam Kai; 30. Abdurrahman; 31. Ahmad or Hamad; 32. Sowi or Sawi (Asawi); 33. Sultan Yari; 34. Lefia (Maina Muhammad ibn Yari); 35. Dala; 36. Daward (Khalifa Daudumi); 37. Lefia; 38. Dala; 39. Umr; 40. Chiroma; 41. Medu or Maidugu; 42. Kademi or Kazgin; 43. Kâlah or Kâle; 44. Shattima "who is Mahir-asal-Sheikh"

According to Palmer, the differences at the end of List A are due to a split in the Bilala lineage, with List A representing the branch of a Bilala prince named Shettima, not of the main line. Palmer believed both List A and List B to be faulty but stated that they supplemented each other, claiming that an approximate full list could be created by combining the two. Palmer also created a comparative list, where several figures were speculatively identified as the same, such as Othman ibn Affan in List A perhaps being the same figure as Muhammad el-Yamani in List B.

=== Hagenbucher's list ===
Frank Hagenbucher wrote down a list of Bilala rulers in April 1967, published in 1968 as part of a larger collection of notes and observations on the Bilala. Hagenbucher's list is limited to the Bilala rulers of Yao, i.e. after their flight from Kanem. Hagenbucher's list begins with Mahamat Djil Essa Tubo, who Hagenbucher identified as the first sultan of Yao.

Name	Regnal years	Relationship, notes	Seat
Mahamat Djil Essa Tubo	40 years	First sultan of Yao	Yao
Tshéroma Mahamat	23 years	Son of predecessor	Yao
Mahamat Madgashé	30 years	Son of predecessor	Yao
Mada Saxaïr (a.k.a. Mat Kurtu)	18 years	Son of predecessor	Yao
Mahamat Djourab el Kabir	28 years	Son of predecessor	Yao
Mahamat Mortcho	80 years	Son of predecessor	Yao
Djourab el Mongo	3 years	Son of predecessor	Yao
Dogo Arma	3 years	Son of Mahamat Mortcho	Am Sawasil (Note: Located near Ati.)
Mahamat Balkashé	60 years	Son of Mahamat Djourab el Kabir	Yao
Djourab Saxaïr (a.k.a. Bob Gumsu)	1 year and 6 months	Son of predecessor	Yao
Moussa Mortcho	7 months	Son of Mahamat Mortcho	Am Sawasil
Djourab Saxaïr (second reign)	3 years	Returned to the throne	Yao
Bayé Mortcho	15 years	Son of Moussa Mortcho	Yao
Djourab Saxaïr (third reign)	38 years	Returned to the throne	Yao
Hassan Baïkouma	7 years	Son of predecessor	Yao
Djili	3 years	Son of Djourab Saxaïr	Yao
Mahamat Gadaï	12 years	Son of Djourab Saxaïr	Yao
Hassan Absakin	22 years	Son of Tschéroma Abdallah, a nephew of Mahamat Balkashé	Yao
Mahamat Hassan Abba	23 years	Son of Hassan Absakin	Yao
Oumar Mahamat Abba	24 years	Son of predecessor	Yao
Hassan Absakin		Became ruler in 1967	Yao

== Recent rulers (late 19th century–present) ==
Lists of Bilala rulers are largely in agreement from the death of Djourab Saxaïr (Jurab al-Saghir) in the late 19th century, though dates are inconsistent and contradictory.

This period began with a civil war over the throne between two of Djourab's sons, Hassan Baïkouma (Hassan Bekuma) and Mahamat Gadaï (Muhammad Gadai). Gadaï, based in "Auni (near Meto)", failed to take the throne and was in exile in the Wadai Sultanate for seven years until the Wadai sultan Yusuf defeated Hassan's son Djili and installed Gadaï as ruler. Gadaï ruled until French colonization. The throne has since then been in the hands of the line of Gadaï's relative Hassan Absakine.

Name	Reign	Relation to predecessor
Hassan Baïkouma (or Hassan Bekuma)	"7 years"	Son of Djourab Saxaïr (Jurab al-Saghir)
Djili (or Jiri)	"3 years"	Son or brother
Mahamat Gadaï (or Gudei, Kadai, Kade)	"12 years", "13 years", killed in 1909? (Note: Mahamat Gadaï is said in one girgam to have been defeated and killed by the French at Mulabis. The Lake Fitri region was occupied and colonized by France in May 1909.)	Uncle or brother (Note: Son of Djourab Saxaïr (Jurab al-Saghir))
Hassan Absakine (or Hassan Absakin)	"20 years", "22 years", incumbent in 1917	First cousin, once removed (Note: Hagenbucher states that Hassan Absakine was a son of Tschéroma Abdallah, a nephew of Mahamat Balkashé.)
Mahamat Hassan Abba (or Tchoroma)	"23 years", became sultan in 1922	Son
Oumar Mahamat Abba	"24 years"	Son
Hassan Absakine Oumar Mahamat Abba	1967–1973	Son
Tchoroma Hassane Absakine	1973–present	Son

== See also ==
- List of mais of Kanem–Bornu – the line of Sayfawa rulers, rivals and possibly relatives of the Bilala rulers
