= Ali Fannami =

- Regent of the Kanem–Bornu Empire
- Burial: Garuza, Bornu
- Dynasty: Sayfawa dynasty
- Father: Muhammad VI Aminami
- Mother: Fanna

Ali (ʿAlī bin Muḥammad), called Ali Fannami, (Note: "Ali, son of Fanna") Ali Ghamarami, (Note: Translated by Richmond Palmer as "Ali of the tribe of Gimara", supposedly pointing to the origin of his mother. This name is alternatively spelled Gimarami, Ghamarámi, and Rhamarami.) and Ali Ngumaramma, was a prince of the Sayfawa dynasty who may have served as regent of the Kanem–Bornu Empire in the mid-16th century, ruling in the name of his nephew mai Abdullah IV Dunamami. Ali was remembered in later tradition as a mighty builder.

== Life ==
Ali was a son of mai Muhammad VI Aminami and Fanna, and a full brother of mai Dunama VI Muhammad. Some girgams (king lists) add Ali as a ruler of the empire between Dunama and Dunama's son Abdullah IV Dunamami. Ali is most often interpreted as having served as regent for Abdullah, then suggested to have been too young to rule, though the situation is not clear.

The length of Ali's possible regency is unknown. Ali was remembered as a "mighty builder". He is credited with building the settlement of Garuza (in modern-day Bauchi State, Nigeria) and was reportedly buried there.
