= Ibrahim III Gumsami =

Mai of the Kanem–Bornu Empire
- Reign: 17th century (7 years) c. 1618–1625 (Note: All king lists (girgams) and chronicles translated in the 19th–20th centuries (by Barth, Nachtigal, Landeroin, Palmer, Urvoy) agree that Ibrahim ruled for seven years. Barth specifies a reign of 7 years and 7 months. Due to differing dates and calculations for other mais, various dates have been given for his reign, including 1618–1625 (Barth), 1618–1625 (Palmer), 1632–1639 (Urvoy), 1612–1619 (Landeroin), and 1624–1631 (Nachtigal). Bosworth (2012) followed Barth and Palmer, placing Ibrahim's reign in 1618–1625.)
- Predecessor: Muhammad VII Bukalmarami
- Successor: Umar III al-Maqdisi
- Died: c. 1625; Ngazargamu or Galagâti, Bornu
- Dynasty: Sayfawa dynasty
- Father: Idris IV Alooma
- Mother: Gumsu (Note: Palmer rendered Ibrahim's mother's name as Gumsu. Barth spelled it Ghumsu and Urvoy spelled it Goumsa. Cohen (1966) used Palmer's rendition.)

Ibrahim III (Ibrāhīm bin Idrīs), called Ibrahim Gumsami, (Note: "Ibrahim, son of Gumsu". Ibrahim is also sometimes recorded under the Kanuri name Burema.) was mai (ruler) of the Kanem–Bornu Empire in the early 17th century, ruling approximately 1618–1625.

== Life ==
Ibrahim was a son of mai Idris IV Alooma. His mother was named Gumsu, or bore the title gumsu (senior wife of the mai), and she was "of the house of the Magaram". Ibrahim became mai in the early 17th century, succeeding his half-brother Muhammad VII Bukalmarami. The German explorer Heinrich Barth, who visited Bornu in the 1850s, noted that the Kanem–Bornu Empire's royal chronicles recorded that Ibrahim sent an embassy to Tripoli, then part of Ottoman Tripolitania. (Note: Barth dated Ibrahim's embassy to 1627, contradicting his own dating of Ibrahim's reign to 1618–1625. Either this date is wrong or the event is assigned to the wrong mai.) Ibrahim's reign was a prosperous time for the empire, according to a girgam (regnal list) translated by Richmond Palmer:

"Me Burema [mai Ibrahim]. Son of Gumsu, in whose time to one wet season there were seven autumns, and milk was plenteous. Even yearling heifers yielded milk, and young kids."

Ibrahim ruled for seven years. He died at Ngazargamu or at a site called Galagâti, and was succeeded as mai by another half-brother, Umar III al-Maqdisi.
