= Idris Alooma =

Ruler of the Kanem–Bornu Empire (c. 1570–1603)

Idris IV Alooma
- Amīr al-muʾminīn; Khalīfat Allāh (Note: Ahmed ibn Fartua, the Imam of mai Idris, refers to him with these titles in his historical account of the first twelve years of his reign.)

Mai of the Kanem–Bornu Empire
- Reign: 16th/17th century (32–51 years) c. 1570–1603 (Note: Different king lists (girgams) and chronicles translated in the 19th–20th centuries give Idris slightly different regnal lengths: 32 years (Palmer), 33 years (Barth), 36 years (Urvoy), 51 years (Nachtigal), or 51 years and 5 months (Landeroin). As a result of this, and due to different calculations for other mais, various dates have been given for his reign, including 1571–1603 (Barth), 1570–1602/1603 (Palmer), 1580–1616 (Urvoy), 1545–1596 (Landeroin), and 1563–1614 (Nachtigal). Cohen (1966) considered a reign of about 35 years most likely. Stewart (1989) mixed the dates of Palmer and Urvoy, giving Idris a shortened reign dated to 1580–1603. Bosworth (2012) followed Palmer, dating Idris's reign to 1569–1603.)
- Predecessor: Aissa Koli
- Successor: Muhammad VII Bukalmarami
- Died: c. 1603; Around modern-day Maiduguri
- Burial: Alau Lake
- Spouse: Fanna; Gumsu; Fusam
- Issue: Muhammad VII Bukalmarami; Ibrahim III Gumsami; Umar III al-Maqdisi
Names
- Idris ibn ‘Ali ibn Idris ibn ‘Ali ibn Ahmad ibn ‘Othman ibn Idris
- Dynasty: Sayfawa dynasty
- Father: Ali II Zainami
- Mother: Amsa Aliram

al-Ḥājj Idris IV (Note: Some chronologies of Kanem–Bornu rulers omit the 14th-century Idris II Saradima, lowering the regnal numbers of later rulers of this name. This ruler is then considered Idris III.) (Idrīs bin ʿAlī), called Idris Alooma (Note: There are several alternative spellings for this name, including Alouma, Alauma, Alawoma, and Aluma.) and Idris Amsami, was mai (ruler) of the Kanem–Bornu Empire in the mid-to-late 16th century and early 17th century, ruling approximately 1570–1603. In Idris's time, the empire covered parts of modern-day Chad, Cameroon, Niger and Nigeria. Idris's reign and achievements are primarily chronicled by Ahmad bin Fartuwa, his chief Imam. Idris's reign marked the end of conflicts with the Bilala of Kanem, securing the eastern side of Lake Chad under Sayfawa control. Furthermore, he introduced significant legal reforms based on Islamic law, establishing qadi courts that operated independently from the executive branch. He was credited with leading the empire to what is often regarded as its zenith during the late 16th century and early 17th century.

Bornu faced instability before his reign, including famines, raids from neighbours, and internal conflicts. By the end of his reign, Idris had successfully expanded Bornu's influence over vast territories, including the majority of Hausaland, the Tuareg of Aïr, the Tebu of Bilma, Tibesti, and even the Bilala of Kanem. Of particular note is the acquisition of Aïr and Bilma, which granted Bornu strategic control over the central Saharan trade routes. This development significantly contributed to the prosperity of Idris Alooma and his successors, enabling them to foster improved diplomatic relations with North African powers, notably Tripoli.

During the late 16th century, the Ottoman Caliphate's expansion towards Fezzan, an important trade hub in the trans-Saharan trade, became a concern for Bornu. Alooma sought negotiations with Istanbul to regain control of Fezzan which Sultan Murad III declined, but urged amicable relations with Bornu. As tensions rose, Bornu sought aid from Morocco's Ahmad al-Mansur, potentially to counter Ottoman control. Though al-Mansur agreed conditionally, no historical evidence shows his actual support. Shortly after Bornu's final envoy to Morocco, between 1582–1583 and 1585, the entire Ottoman garrison in Fezzan was slaughtered, leading to the return of the Awlad Muhammad dynasty. Alooma may have strategically exploited the rivalry between Morocco and the Ottoman Empire to reclaim Fezzan.

== Early life ==
Idris Alooma was a son of mai Ali II Zainami. Idris's mother, Amsa Aliram, was likely a daughter of a Bilala ruler. Accounts differ on the nature of Idris's rise to the throne and his relationship to his predecessor, the magira ("queen mother") Aissa Koli.

Ali died after a brief reign and had no adult male heirs, leading to the succession of Dunama VI Muhammad (Ali's nephew) and Dunama's son Abdullah IV Dunamami. Amsa may have faced challenges in protecting her son during the reigns of these mais. In the absence of male Sayfawa dynasts, Aissa Koli assumed the throne after Abdullah IV, using the title magira ("queen mother"). Some accounts designate Aissa as a sister or daughter of Dunama VI, others as a daughter of Ali II and thus Idris's sister. Aissa ruled until Idris could assume the throne, Idris either having been at court but too young or having been missing, and then abdicated in his favor.

Some versions of Idris's origin tale claim that Aissa raised Idris in secret and helped to hide him from Dunama and Abdullah, constructing a brick palace for him near the Yobe River in Gambaru (in modern-day Yunusari), which was located away from Bornu's capital, Ngazargamu. Some accounts incorrectly identify Aissa as Idris's mother; this mistake may have resulted from confusion due to Aissa's use of the title magira.

== Reign ==
The reign of Idris Alooma is the best documented of all of the Sayfawa rulers owing to his chief Imam, Ahmad ibn Fartuwa, who recorded the first twelve years of his reign. However, the remaining years are practically unknown. Before his ascension, Bornu was in a delicate and unstable period. The state was just leaving a short period during which it was ruled by magira Aisa. Bornu had suffered long famines in the reigns of his two predecessors. It was being raided by its neighbors on all sides. Furthermore, conflict with the Bilala of Kanem were still ongoing to the east. Even within Bornu itself, the Sao, Ngizim and the numerous lesser groups who remained unislamised had not yet been fully pacified.

Edris Alawoma (Idris Alauma) appears to have been an excellent prince, uniting in himself the most opposite qualities: warlike energy combined with mildness and intelligence; courage, with circumspection and patience, severity with pious feelings.

— Heinrich Barth, Travels and discoveries in North and Central Africa

Alooma introduced a number of legal and administrative reforms based on Islamic law. He established qadi courts to oversee legal proceedings, effectively separating the judiciary from the executive branch. Prior to his rule, only the ruling class and a number of clerical families had been Muslims and during the century-long decline of the empire, the significance of the religion had diminished. It was noted by Ibn Fartua that, during Alooma's reign, most of the Bornu notables converted to Islam. Despite his attempts, however, there is no convincing evidence that Islamic law became Bornu's state law, nor did it completely replace non-Islamic beliefs and practices in the state according to historian Mervyn Hiskett.

Alooma also sponsored the construction of numerous mosques and introduced the use of fired red mud bricks in these constructions. The mud bricks replaced the more temporary reeds. Furthermore, he made at least two pilgrimages to Mecca, where he arranged for the establishment of a hostel to be used by pilgrims from his empire and a date grove.

Map of Kanem-Bornu in 1650

Government revenue came from tribute (or booty if the recalcitrant people had to be conquered) and duties on and participation in trade. Unlike West Africa, the Chadian region did not have gold. Still, it was central to one of the most convenient routes across the Sahara desert. Between Lake Chad and Fezzan lay a sequence of well-spaced wells and oases and from Fezzan there were easy connections to North Africa and the Mediterranean. Many products were sent north, including natron (sodium carbonate), cotton, kola nuts, ivory, ostrich feathers, perfume, wax, and hides, but the most profitable trade was in slaves. Imports included salt, horses, silk, glass, muskets, and copper. He introduced the use of large boats capable of crossing the Lake Chad 'rapidly' replacing the smaller gagara boats from 'ancient times' which took two to three days to make the same journey. This allowed his army to travel faster and also supported trade in the region.

=== Military campaigns ===
One of the most well known aspects of Alooma's legacy was his extensive military expeditions and innovations. He employed Turkish military advisers to train his gunmen so they fully utilise his newly acquire muskets. These Turks were likely mercenaries who migrated to Bornu in pursuit of renown and riches. Alooma also implemented the widespread establishment of ribats, fortified military posts, to uphold his authority and secure control across the entirety of Bornu. Furthermore, he was credited with introducing the use of camel cavalry in the Lake Chad region.

Alooma also adopted certain policies that aided his military successes. He placed a particular importance to the effective use of time. His armies were meticulously organised and he coordinated the movements of large formations, concentrating them at crucial points, and dispersing them to prevent the strain on the limited food resources of semi-arid regions. These strategies were likely adopted from or influenced by the Madugus, who were renowned for leading merchant caravans through the Sahara desert.

His armies conducted far-reaching campaigns that covered a vast geographical expanse, ranging from the Fezzan region in southern Libya to the Kawar region in northern Niger, the Kanem region in eastern Chad, the Mandara region in northern Cameroon, and even as far as Hausaland in northern Nigeria, reaching as distant as Kano. He embarked on a mission to restore Bornu's authority over the territories the empire had lost due to the bloody dynastic conflict it had suffered for a century. This process of reclamation was started by his great-grandfather mai Ali I Gaji.

==== Amsaka campaigns ====
According to Ibn Fartua, Amsaka was a formidable city with a diverse non-Muslim population (in modern-day Kaza near the border of Dikwa and Kala Balge in Borno state). The town was encircled by a deep ditch and was situated to the east of Mandara. Unlike similar towns in the region, Amsaka did not have a single ruler. He further described its inhabitants as "insolent, rebellious and very troublesome." Even before the establishment of Ngazargamu in the late 15th-century, Amsaka had already gained a reputation as a mighty town that was heavily defended. Ibn Fartua remarked that Ali I Gaji used to make expeditions against "all the towns of the heathen except the land of Amsaka alone. The only reason they held off and left it alone was because of the power of its inhabitants in war and their stout defence of their town."

(The people of Amsaka) in their pride and self sufficiency they said to the Muslims:— “You are as you were before, and we are as we were “at first—and neither side will change—and none save the “birds will see the inside of our stockade and town.”

— Ahmed ibn Fartua, History of The First Twelve Years of The Reign of Mai Idris Alooma of Bornu (1571—1583)

Mai Idris admired the town for its "stubbornness and exclusiveness and presumption." In c. 1575, he, alongside Yamtarawalla, the chief of the Babur of Biu, made an initial attempt to invade and sack Amsaka, but he faced a fierce resistance and was repelled. After this initial failure, he took the time to carefully consider his next move. Some years later, he launched a second invasion, this time with a large army. However, instead of directly assaulting the city, he ordered his eager army to encamp just outside the town's east gate and to begin filling the deep trench that surrounded it.

The people of Amsaka responded by hurling spears, rocks, burning thatch, and pots of boiling human waste at Alooma's men filling the trench, but these efforts proved ineffective. They also showered the trench fillers with arrows, which likewise did not deter them. Each night, the people of Amsaka would attempt to remove the bundles of guinea corn stalks that Alooma's army had placed in the trench. However, these actions did not discourage Mai Idris. In response, Mai Idris ordered that all the arrows fired at his army be collected, which caused the town's supply of arrowheads to start running low. He also ordered the construction of high platforms around the city, from which his musketeers could fire into Amsaka and provide cover for the trench fillers. Once the trench was successfully filled, Mai Idris commanded that the wooden stockade surrounding the city be chopped down, ultimately leading to the dismantling of Amsaka's defenses.

On the last day of the Islamic month Sha'aban, which fell just before the start of Ramadan, specifically on 4 December 1575, Mai Idris led the siege of Amsaka and sacked it. He ordered the complete destruction of the town and the slaughter of all its inhabitants. According to Ibn Fartua, Mai Idris' army suffered only one casualty, a man named Ajima ibn Kalle, during the conquest. This victory in Amsaka elevated Alooma's reputation and standing. As a result, numerous settlements in the region sent representatives bearing gifts, signifying their submission to his rule and their agreement to pay a regular "poll-tax". Amsaka never regained its 'might' and is today a village with a small population.

==== Kanem campaigns ====
The mai initiated more than five military expeditions in Kanem as part of the long-ongoing conflict with the Bilala. Idris led 'systematic efforts' to reduce Kanem to submission and eventually, a peace agreement was reached with Abdullah, the Bilala mai of Kanem, and two pieces of document were written and signed. Despite the treaty, there remained disputed territories, leading to the establishment of clear demarcations to define the borders. However, soon after the signing of the treaty, Abdullah died, and his son Muhammad assumed leadership.

Muhammad's rule was short-lived as he was swiftly ousted by his uncle, Abd al-Jalil, who not only terminated the negotiations but also declined any alliance with Idris. This refusal led to a conflict where Idris's forces suffered significant losses but ultimately emerged victorious. As a result, Njimi (the former capital of Kanem–Bornu) and the surrounding areas to the east were incorporated into Bornu, although the rulership of Kanem was reinstated to Muhammad. Idris left behind a strong party of local dignitaries, who were primarily Shuwa Arabs, to support Muhammad's governance. However, circumstances necessitated Idris's return to Kanem, where he succeeded in fully annexing the region, thus integrating Kanem into the territory of Bornu.

=== Relations with North Africa and the Ottoman empire ===
In the late 16th century, the North African region saw an increase in Ottoman presence. Following the conquest of the Maghreb, the Ottoman influence, initially confined to the coastal regions and the vicinity of Tripoli, began to expand southward, particularly toward the Lake Chad region of Bornu. Spearheading this expansion was Mahmut Bey, a sanjak of the eyalet of Tripoli. In 1577–8, Mahmut successfully seized the Fezzan oases, leading to the expulsion of the Awlad Muhammad dynasty, which had governed Fezzan for fifty years, to Katsina, a Hausa city-state likely under Bornu control.

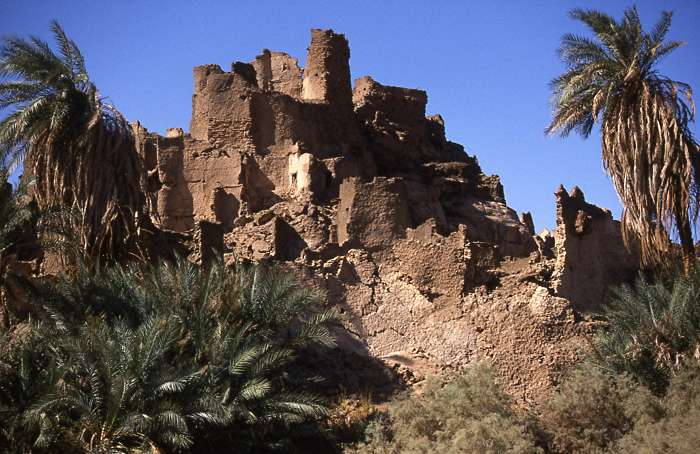
The abandoned Djado fort in Bilma, located on the Bornu-Kaouar-Fezzan-Tripoli trade route. The fort was under Kanem-Bornu during the reign of Mai Idris in the late 16th-century.

The developments in Fezzan directly impacted Bornu's interests, given Fezzan's crucial position as a commercial crossroads in the Central Sahara. In response, Alooma dispatched his envoy, al-hajj Yusuf, to Istanbul, asking the Ottomans to relinquish the fortress known as Fezzān or Qal'at Q.rân (according to B. G. Martin, it was likely located in Bilma in modern-day Niger Republic). This fortress, situated along the trade route connecting Bornu with the Libyan coast, was a pivotal asset. While Sultan Murad III refused to cede the conquered territory to mai Idris, he gave strict orders to Mahmut and the beylerbeyi of Tripoli to maintain amicable relations with Bornu and its subjects. Throughout the 1570s, interactions between Bornu and the Ottomans persisted, with Alooma sending delegations to Istanbul on two more occasions, the last being in 1579. The Ottoman Sultan further urged the beylerbeyis of Egypt and Tunis to foster friendly ties with Bornu and ensure the protection of Bornu pilgrims en route to Mecca.

At the outset of the 1580s, a strain emerged in the relationship between the two empires, likely due to the persistent refusal of the Ottomans to relinquish the Fezzan region. In response, mai Idris dispatched al-hajj Yusuf to seek assistance from Ahmad al-Mansur of Morocco, who harbored a rivalry with Sultan Murad III. Al-hajj Yusuf made multiple trips to Morocco between 1581 and 1583. The episode was chronicled in detail by the vizier of al-Mansur, Abd al-Aziz b. Muhammad al-Fishtali, in his work, Manāhil al-safā. According to al-Fishtali, al-Mansur agreed to aid mai Idris on the condition that mai Idris pledges bay'ah to him as Amir al-Muminin and his caliph. Although mai Idris seemingly agreed to this pledge, there is no evidence that al-Mansur ever provided military support to Bornu. Similarly, there is no historical record of Bornu assisting Morocco during its invasion of Songhai.

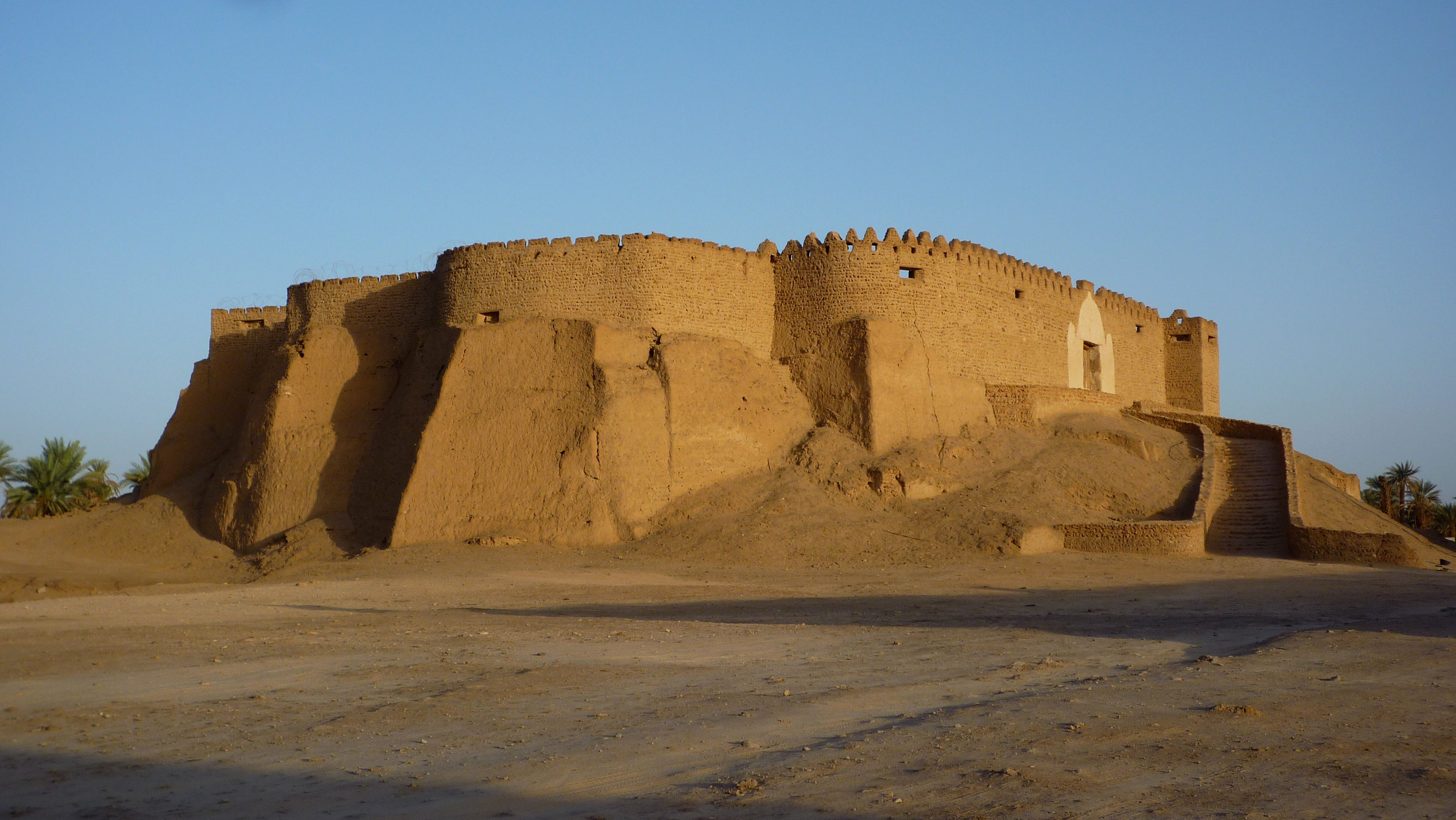
The castle of Murzuq from where the Awlad Muhammad dynasty ruled Fezzan. After the Ottoman capture of Fezzan in the late 16th-century, they occupied the castle and maintained a garrison there.

The motivations, implications, and outcomes of this diplomatic mission remain ambiguous, both from the perspectives of Bornu and Morocco. It is widely believed that al-Mansur sought to establish a caliphate to rival the Ottoman Empire, using this embassy to advance that objective. However, mai Idris's intentions remain unclear. Shortly after the final envoy from mai Idris to al-Mansur, between 1582–3 and 1585, the entire Ottoman garrison in Fezzan was slaughtered, leading to the return of the Awlad Muhammad dynasty from Katsina to resume their governance of the region.

According to historian Remi Dewière, the proximity of these events may not have been coincidental and Idris Alooma may have strategized the reconquest of Fezzan. Dewière argued that the bay'ah pledge by Alooma was 'purely symbolic' and that he exploited the rivalry between al-Mansur and Murad III "in order to resolve a local issue." Given the Islamic legitimacy of the Ottoman sultans as protectors of the Holy cities of Islam, with Tripoli and Cairo serving as vital economic partners under Ottoman control, aligning with al-Mansur, a rival caliph, provided Alooma with an opportunity to challenge Ottoman hegemony and the Islamic legacy in Fezzan. However, not acknowledging al-Mansur as the legitimate Caliph of Islam meant that any action against the Ottomans could be interpreted as an affront to the ulama.

Following the restoration of the Awlad Muhammad dynasty, Bornu regained control of the Bornu-Tripoli trade route, previously under Ottoman authority.

== Death ==
Mai Idrisa, son of Arri, son of Ainsa, the fair, the walls of whose town were red, who had towns in Tchad (and) thousand a hundred and ten rocks: he is at Alau.

— Girgam translated by H.R. Palmer

Mai Idris was killed near modern-day Maiduguri by a 'pagan' archer who was hidden on top a tree. The region was said to have been occupied, at the time, by Gamargu and Mabani peoples. He was buried in the middle of the Alau Lake, whence his nickname Alau-ma or Aloo-ma.

== Bibliography ==
- Barkindo, Bawuro: "The early states of the Central Sudan", in: J. Ajayi and M. Crowder (eds.), The History of West Africa, vol. I, 3rd ed. Harlow 1985, 225–254.
- Dewière, Rémi, Du lac Tchad à La Mecque. Le sultanat du Borno et son Monde (16e-17s siècle), Paris, Publications de La Sorbonne, 2017 (Open Access Edition: ).
- Hunwick, John: "Songhay, Bornu and Hausaland in the sixteenth century", in: J. Ajayi and M. Crowder (eds.), The History of West Africa, vol. I, 1st ed. London 1971, 202–239.
- Ibn Furṭū: "The Kanem wars", in: Herbert R. Palmer: Sudanese Memoirs, vol. I, Lagos 1928, p. 15-81.
- Lange, Dierk: Le Dīwān des sultans du Kanem-Bornu, Wiesbaden 1977.
- --: A Sudanic Chronicle: the Borno Expeditions of Idrīs Alauma'to, Wiesbaden 1987.
