= Muhammad VII Bukalmarami =

Mai of the Kanem–Bornu Empire
- Reign: 17th century (10–16 years) c. 1603–1618 (Note: Most king lists (girgams) and chronicles translated in the 19th–20th centuries (by Barth, Landeroin, Palmer, Urvoy) agree that Muhammad ruled for 16 years. Nachtigal disagrees and gives 10 years. Barth specifies a reign of 16 years and 7 months. Due to differing dates and calculations for other mais, various dates have been given for his reign, including 1602–1618 (Barth), 1602/1603–1618 (Palmer), 1616–1632 (Urvoy), 1596–1612 (Landeroin), and 1614–1624 (Nachtigal). Cohen (1966) considered a reign of 16 years to be most likely. Bosworth (2012) followed Palmer, placing Ibrahim's reign in 1603–1618.)
- Predecessor: Idris IV Alooma
- Successor: Ibrahim III Gumsami
- Died: c. 1618 "Dékana" (?)
- Dynasty: Sayfawa dynasty
- Father: Idris IV Alooma
- Mother: Fanna (Note: Barth gives Fanna and Palmer variously gives Fanna or Amina. Cohen (1966) used the name provided by Barth, a practice also followed by researchers at the modern-day Borno Museum.)

Muhammad VII (Note: Some chronologies of Kanem–Bornu rulers omit the 14th-century Muhammad II Manza, lowering the regnal numbers of later rulers of this name. This ruler is then considered Muhammad VI.) (Muḥammad bin Idrīs), called Muhammad Bukalmarami, (Note: "Muhammad of the land of Buggal", referring to the origin of his mother. The name is also spelled Bugalmarambi and Bukalmárami.) Muhammad Dagnu, Muhammad Dansikima, (Note: "Muhammad, lord of Dansiki", one of the purported sites of his death.) and Muhammad Fannami, (Note: "Muhammad, son of Fanna".) was mai (ruler) of the Kanem–Bornu Empire in the early 17th century, ruling approximately 1603–1618. Muhammad was remembered as an excellent ruler, though he did not possess the same vigour as his father, Idris IV Alooma.

== Life ==
Muhammad was a son of mai Idris IV Alooma. His mother was named Fanna, said to have been a "princess of the land of Buggal". Muhammad became mai in the early 17th century, succeeding his successful father.

Muhammad was later remembered in Bornu as an excellent ruler, renowned for his patience, handsome appearance, and modesty. His patience and rulership were said to have been so great that "no discord was heard of in his prosperous days" and "envious and malicious tongues were silent". According to the German explorer Heinrich Barth, who visited Bornu in the 1850s and transcribed some of the empire's royal chronicles, Muhammad was "less warlike and enterprising" than his father, though these qualities were no longer necessary as Idris had left the empire well established. Some chronicles referred to Muhammad as "the lion son of Idris".

Muhammad ruled for over a decade. The name of the site of his death is variously given as Dékana, Dagana, Dagana Daniski, or Akana, Barth speculated that Dékana might have been a location in the territory of the Duganna, a tribe of Shuwa Arabs. Muhammad was succeeded as mai by his half-brother Ibrahim III Gumsami.
