= Sa'id of Bornu =

Saʽid

Mai of the Kanem–Bornu Empire
- Reign: 14th century (0–1 years) c. 1387–1388 (Note: King lists (girgams) and chronicles translated in the 19th–20th centuries assign Saʽid a reign of 0 years (Palmer, Nachtigal), 7 months (Landeroin), or 1 year (Barth, Urvoy). As a result of this, and due to different calculations for other mais, various dates have been given for his reign, including 1398–1399 (Barth), 1391 (Palmer), 1387–1388 (Urvoy), 1406–1407 (Landeroin), and 1435 (Nachtigal). Lange (1984) dated his reign to 1387–1388, Stewart (1989) dated it to 1398–1399, and Bosworth (2012) dated it to 1387–1388.)
- Predecessor: Umar I Idrismi
- Successor: Muhammad II Manza
- Died: c. 1388 "Dekakíya"
- Dynasty: Sayfawa dynasty (Idrisid (Note: The 14th and 15th centuries saw protracted civil wars between the rival Idrisid (descendants of Idris I Nikalemi) and Dawudid (descendants of Dawud Nikalemi) branches of the Sayfawa dynasty.))
- Father: Idris I Nikalemi (Note: Nearly all sources agree that Saʽid was a son of Idris (Palmer, Landeroin, Nachtigal). Heinrich Barth instead believed Saʽid was an unrelated usurper because his copy of the royal chronicle called him melek instead of sultan. Dierk Lange, without specifying a reason, designated Saʽid as a son of Idris's brother Dawud Nikalemi.)

Saʽid (Note: The name is also spelled Saad.) (Saʽīd bin Idrīs) was briefly mai (ruler) of the Kanem–Bornu Empire in the late 14th century, ruling approximately 1387–1388. Saʽid ruled during the "Era of Instability", a chaotic period of internal and external conflict in the empire.

== Life ==
Saʽid was a son of mai Idris I Nikalemi. Saʽid succeeded his brother Umar I Idrismi as mai in the late 14th century. Umar's reign had seen the loss of the empire's heartland, Kanem, to the Bilala, forcing Umar to re-center the empire west of Lake Chad in Bornu. Saʽid was thus the first ruler of the empire who for the entirety of his reign ruled only Bornu. He may have been chosen to succeed Umar over other possible successors due to better representing the interests of the inhabitants of Bornu in some way.

Saʽid's reign was short. After a year or less on the throne, Saʽid faced an invasion of the Bilala into Bornu and was killed by the invaders near a site called Dekakíya (or variations thereof, such as Dagage). He was succeeded as mai by his brother Muhammad II Manza.
