= Dunama VI Muhammad =

Mai of the Kanem–Bornu Empire
- Reign: 16th century (9–22 years) c. 1545–1555 (Note: Different king lists (girgams) and chronicles translated in the 19th–20th centuries give Dunama different regnal lengths: 9 years (Palmer), 16 years (Nachtigal), 19 years (Barth), 19 years and 9 months (Landeroin), or 22 years (Urvoy). As a result of this, and due to different calculations for other mais, various dates have been given for his reign, including 1546–1563 (Barth), 1546–1555 (Palmer), 1548–1566 (Urvoy), 1512–1531 (Landeroin), and 1539–1555 (Nachtigal). Cohen (1966) considered a reign of 20 years most likely. Later authors have preferred slightly shorter reigns, such as 1546–1563, used by both Stewart (1989) and Bosworth (2012).)
- Predecessor: Ali II Zainami
- Successor: Abdullah IV Dunamami
- Died: c. 1555; Ngazargamu, Bornu
- Issue: Abdullah IV Dunamami; Aissa Koli (?)
- Dynasty: Sayfawa dynasty
- Father: Muhammad VI Aminami (Note: All sources except Landeroin designate Dunama as Muhammad VI Aminami's son. Landeroin designates Dunama as a son of Idris III Katagarmabe.)
- Mother: Fanna

Dunama Muhammad (Dunama Muḥammad bin Muḥammad), enumerated as Dunama VI (Note: Some chronologies of Kanem–Bornu rulers omit the 14th-century Dunama III, lowering the regnal numbers of later rulers of this name. This ruler is then considered Dunama V.) and called Dunama Ghamarami, (Note: Translated by Richmond Palmer as "Dunama of the tribe of Gimara", supposedly pointing to the origin of his mother. This name is alternatively spelled Gimarami, Ghamarámi, and Rhamarami.) Dunama Fannami, (Note: "Dunama, son of Fanna") and Dunama Ngumaramma, was mai (ruler) of the Kanem–Bornu Empire in the mid-16th century, ruling approximately 1545–1555.

== Life ==
Dunama Muhammad was probably a son of mai Muhammad VI Aminami. His mother was named Fanna. Dunama became mai in the mid-16th century, succeeding Muhammad VI's brother Ali II Zainami.

Dunama is credited with fortifying the empire's capital, Ngazargamu. There was a great famine in Bornu during Dunama's reign; later chronicles named this famine Bu Ihagana. Some accounts claim that Dunama had all of Ali II's sons killed (with the exception of Idris Alooma, who was hidden away) in order to avoid the possibility of one of them taking the throne.

Dunama's reign saw renewed conflict with the Bilala, who governed Kanem as vassals of the empire. The Bilala ruler of Kanem, Abd al-Jalil, attacked Dunama at a site called Berberuwá. Dunama was victorious, driving Abd al-Jalil back to Kanem and defeating him in a battle there as well. The heir to the Bilala throne was killed at this second battle. The Bilala were reduced to vassals again, though people from Kanem continued to sometimes go on raids into Bornu, the empire's heartland.

There is considerable variation in the regnal dates assigned to Dunama; he may have ruled for less than ten years or for over twenty. Dunama died at Ngazargamu and was succeeded as mai by his son Abdullah IV Dunamami.
