= Idris V =

Mai of the Kanem–Bornu Empire
- Reign: 17th century (17–20 years) c. 1680–1699 (Note: Different king lists (girgams) and chronicles translated in the 19th–20th centuries give Idris slightly different regnal lengths: 17 years (Urvoy), 19 years (Palmer), or 20 years (Barth, Landeroin, Nachtigal). As a result of this, and due to different calculations for other mais, various dates have been given for his reign, including 1685–1704 (Barth), 1680/1684–1699 (Palmer), 1694–1711 (Urvoy), 1674–1694 (Landeroin), and 1670–1690 (Nachtigal). Cohen (1966) considered a reign of 20 years most likely. For unknown reasons, Bosworth (2012) assigned Idris a shortened 14-year reign, dated to 1684–1699.)
- Predecessor: Ali III Walamma
- Successor: Dunama VII Martemarambi
- Died: c. 1699
- Dynasty: Sayfawa dynasty
- Father: Ali III Walamma

Idris V (Note: Some chronologies of Kanem–Bornu rulers omit the 14th-century Idris II Saradima, lowering the regnal numbers of later rulers of this name. This ruler is then considered Idris IV.) (Idrīs bin ʿAlī) was mai (ruler) of the Kanem–Bornu Empire in the late 17th century, ruling approximately 1680–1699.

== Life ==
Idris was a son of mai Ali III Walamma, who he succeeded as mai in the late 17th century. Very little is recorded of Idris's reign. The German explorer Heinrich Barth, who visited Bornu in the 1850s, noted that Idris was omitted by mistake in some royal chronicles and lists of rulers (girgams).

Idris ruled for over a decade, between 17 and 20 years. The location of his death is not recorded. Idris was succeeded as mai by his brother Dunama VII Martemarambi.
