= Aissa Koli =

Queen regnant in the Kanem–Bornu Empire

Magira of the Kanem–Bornu Empire
- Reign: 16th century (7–8 years) c. 1563–1570 (Note: Specific regnal years of rulers of the Kanem–Bornu Empire are calculated by backdating from known events using their regnal lengths and vary between sources. Palmer (1936) assigned Aissa eight regnal years and dated her reign to 1562/1563–1570. Urvoy (1941) assigned her seven regnal years and dated her reign to 1573–1580. She is sometimes omitted entirely from lists or designated as a co-ruler of Idris IV Alooma. Later authors have generally followed Palmer's dates, placing her reign in c. 1563–1570, but alternate dates also continue to be used, such as 1497–1504. Some authors assign Aissa a longer reign, such as 1570–1580 or even 1560–1610, on an unclear basis.)
- Predecessor: Abdullah IV Dunamami
- Successor: Idris IV Alooma
- Dynasty: Sayfawa dynasty
- Father: Unclear; Muhammad VI Aminami, Ali II Zainami, or Dunama VI Muhammad

Aissa Koli or Aisa Kili (Āʾisha Kili), sometimes called Aisa Kili Ngirmaramma, (Note: Richmond Palmer translated Kili Ngirmaramma in 1912 as "lady of the great white horse".) was a ruler of the Kanem–Bornu Empire in the mid-to-late 16th century, ruling approximately 1563–1570. Formally styled as magira ("queen mother"), Aissa was one of few women to rule the empire and the only known woman to do so in her own right. (Note: The earlier 11th-century ruler Hu has been suggested to have been a woman though this is unproven. In the 12th century, Fasama also wielded considerable power as regent but she formally ruled on behalf of her young son Biri I Uthman.) Aissa remains celebrated in local Bornuan oral tradition but there is considerable disagreement in the sources on most of the details of her reign.

== Life ==
There are discrepancies in the sources on Aissa's familial relationships and the details on her reign. Aissa is celebrated in local oral tradition in Bornu but is often omitted in literary sources written by Arab historians. This is generally attributed to an unwillingness on the part of these historians to acknowledge powerful female rulers.

Aissa is said to have succeeded mai Abdullah IV Dunamami in the absence of obvious male heirs to the throne. Her connection to the empire's ruling Sayfawa dynasty differs depending on the source. Transcripts and translations of Bornuan documents and oral histories done in the 19th and 20th centuries designate her as a daughter of either mai Muhammad VI Aminami (Palmer, 1936) or mai Dunama VI Muhammad (Urvoy, 1941). Another version designates her as a daughter of mai Ali II Zainami and an older sister or half-sister of her successor, mai Idris IV Alooma. Aissa reportedly ruled until Idris was able to assume the throne and then abdicated, having ensured dynastic continuity during a timespan when Idris was either a minor or missing. Aissa continued to serve as a close advisor to Idris after her own reign and is sometimes credited with educating him in politics.

In one version of the tale that presents Aissa as Ali II's daughter, Dunama VI (who succeeded Ali) had all the sons of Ali killed, except for Idris who was sent away to the Bilala in secret by his mother, Amsa. When Abdullah IV (Dunama's heir) died, Aissa succeeded him as ruler as she was unaware that Idris was still alive. Some versions designate Aissa as Idris's mother, perhaps out of confusing resulting from the use of the title magira ("queen mother"). This is false since Idris's mother is known from various sources to have been named Amsa. Ronald Cohen suggested in 1966 that the use of magira could imply that Aissa was a wife of Ali II, but not Idris's mother, and that she thus lacked formal blood ties to the other rulers.
