= Bornu =

Bornu may refer to:

- Bornu (historical region)
  - Kanem–Bornu Empire, which ruled Bornu in the 14th–20th centuries
- Borno State, Nigeria
