= Muhammad VI Aminami =

Mai of the Kanem–Bornu Empire
- Reign: 16th century (15–24 years) c. 1525–1544 (Note: Different king lists (girgams) and chronicles translated in the 19th–20th centuries give Muhammad different regnal lengths: 15 years (Urvoy), 19 years (Barth, Palmer), or 24 years (Landeroin, Nachtigal). As a result of this, and due to different calculations for other mais, various dates have been given for his reign, including 1526–1545 (Barth), 1526/1527–1545 (Palmer), 1529–1544 (Urvoy), 1488–1512 (Landeroin), and 1492–1515 (Nachtigal). Cohen (1966) considered a reign of 20 years most likely. Later authors have tended to follow Barth and Palmer; Stewart (1989) gives Muhammad's reign as 1526–1545 and Bosworth (2012) gives Muhammad's reign as 1525–1544.)
- Predecessor: Idris III Katagarmabe
- Successor: Ali II Zainami
- Died: c. 1544; Ngazargamu, Bornu
- Spouse: Fanna
- Issue: Dunama VI Muhammad; Ali Fannami
- Dynasty: Sayfawa dynasty
- Father: Idris III Katagarmabe
- Mother: Zainab

Muhammad VI (Note: Some chronologies of Kanem–Bornu rulers omit the 14th-century Muhammad II Manza, lowering the regnal numbers of later rulers of this name. This ruler is then considered Muhammad V.) (Muḥammad bin Idrīs), called Muhammad Aminami (Note: "Muhammad, son of Amina". This name is erroneously applied to Muhammad since his mother was named Zainab.) and Muhammad Dunamami, (Note: "Muhammad, son of Dunama". This name is erroneously applied to Muhammad since his father was named Idris.) was mai (ruler) of the Kanem–Bornu Empire in the early-to-mid-16th century, ruling approximately 1525–1544. Muhammad was an accomplished warrior-king, though detailed historical accounts of most of his campaigns have been lost.

== Life ==
Muhammad was a son of mai Idris III Katagarmabe. His mother was named Zainab. Ali became mai in the first half of the 16th century, succeeding his father. Muhammad was an accomplished warrior-king and led successful military campaigns in all directions. Detailed historical accounts of most of these campaigns have not survived.

Merely 40 days after he became mai, Muhammad was forced to face an uprising led by Kade, a Bilala leader, who tried to restore the independence of the Bilala of Kanem (subjugated by Muhammad's father). Muhammad defeated and killed Kade in battle at Lada, west of Ngazargamu. Kade's successor renewed the Bilala's oath of fealty to the empire and Kanem was thus kept under imperial control. In one of his campaigns, Muhammad is said to have reached as far as Karbara in the west. Muhammad is recorded to have waged war against Kanta Kotal, the founder of the Kingdom of Kebbi.

Muhammad sent an embassy to Tripoli in 1534 or 1535.

Muhammad ruled for over a decade, perhaps for over twenty years. He died at Ngazargamu and was succeeded as mai by his brother Ali II Zainami.
