= List of mais of Marte =

The mai of Marte (mai martema) is the traditional leader of the town of Marte in Borno State, Nigeria. Mai is in the case of Marte generally translated as "village head" or "town head". The title derives from the royal/imperial style once used by the monarchs of the Kanem–Bornu Empire, and has as such also sometimes been translated as "king".

== History ==
Like the mais of Kanem–Bornu, the line of mais of Marte before 1900 is reconstructed through a girgam, an orally transmitted royal chronicle. The mais of Marte claim to be one of the oldest, if not the oldest, surviving dynasty in Borno. They claim descent from the formerly ruling Sayfawa dynasty of Kanem–Bornu, with the first mai of Marte, Kadiri Arsomi, being said to have been a son of mai "Ngeleroma" of Bornu. It is unclear which mai this Ngeleroma corresponds to. The precise date of the foundation of Marte and its ruling house is unclear due to discrepancies in the source material, though it is traditionally claimed to have taken place in the 16th or 17th century, about a century or two after the foundation of the Bornu capital Ngazargamu.

The mais of Marte are said to have initially refused to recognise the rise of the al-Kanemi dynasty, which supplanted the Sayfawa dynasty as Bornu's rulers (under the new title shehu) in the mid-19th century. The founder of the al-Kanemi dynasty, Muhammad al-Amin al-Kanemi, is claimed to have attacked Marte three times without success. On his fourth attempt, al-Kanemi managed to seize the town and executed its ruling mai, replacing him with another who was willing to accept his rule. Marte was directly administered from the al-Kanemi capital at Kukawa, though the style of mai martema continued to be attached to local officials. The mais of Marte have continued to serve as the traditional heads of Marte to the present day.

== List ==
=== Line reconstructed through the girgam (pre-1900) ===
1. Kadiri Arsomi, Kadiri Ajomi or Kadiri Arjomi, son of mai "Ngeleroma" of Bornu
2. Duksa Dubuwama or Baram Balumi, son of Kadiri Arsomi. The name Dubuwama derives from Dubuwa, the original name for the settlement now known as Marte.
3. Musa (I) or Dangisa, son of Duksa Dubuwama
4. Musa (II), son of Musa
5. Balumi, son of Musa (unclear which)
6. Kasila, son of Musa (unclear which)
7. Daudu (I), son of Musa (unclear which)
8. Musa (III) Gajami, son of Kasila
9. Musa (IV) Gumsumi, son of Balumi. Contemporary with Muhammad al-Amin al-Kanemi.
10. Ali Tigirami, son of Balumi
11. Mohammadu Gumsumi, son of Kasila
12. Burje, or Burra, son of Kasila
13. Mele (I), son of Daudu
14. Ibrahim (I) Zaitunmi, son of Balumi
15. Bego Bemi, son of Balumi
16. Daudu (II), son of Musa (unclear which)
17. Mala, son of Burje
18. Bukar, son of Bego Bemi
19. Ibrahim (II), son of Bego Bemi
20. Mele (II), son of Bego Bemi
21. Unclear, either Shetima, son of Ibrahim Zaitunmi, or Shettima Fusami, son of Mele (II). One account claims that Shetima succeeded Mele (II) in 1899 and was deposed in favor of Momadu in 1900. Another account claims that Shettima Fusami ruled 1891–1899 and was killed in the wars against Rabih az-Zubayr. It has been suggested that Shettima Fusami is to be identified as the same figure as Mele (II), since both figures are also claimed as the father of Momadu in different accounts.

=== Historically attested mais (1900–present) ===
No.	Name	Reign	Relation	Notes
22	Momadu (Mohammed) Dange Dumsumi	1900–1949	Unclear, son of Mele (II) or Shettima Fusami	
23	Butu	1949–1964	Son of Momadu	
24	Mastapha	1964–1982	Son of Butu	
25	Mastapha (Modu, Mohammed) Martema	1982–? (fl. 2001)	Son of Mastapha	Quarreled with Mustafa ibn Umar al-Kanemi, the shehu of Borno, over authority.
26?	Musinema	?–2024		Killed in an attack on Marte by Boko Haram

== See also ==
- List of mais of Kanem-Bornu
