= Idris III Katagarmabe =

Mai of the Kanem–Bornu Empire
- Reign: 16th century (22–23 years) c. 1503–1525 (Note: All king lists (girgams) and chronicles translated in the 19th–20th centuries (by Barth, Nachtigal, Landeroin, Palmer, Urvoy) agree that Idris ruled for 22 to 23 years. Due to differing dates and calculations for other mais, various dates have been given for his reign, including 1504–1526 (Barth), 1503–1526 (Palmer), 1507–1529 (Urvoy), 1465–1488 (Landeroin), and 1492–1515 (Nachtigal). Stewart (1989) dated Idris's reign to 1504–1526 and Bosworth (2012) dated Idris's reign to 1503–1525.)
- Predecessor: Ali I Gaji
- Successor: Muhammad VI Aminami
- Died: c. 1525; Walama, Bornu
- Spouse: Zainab
- Issue: Muhammad VI Aminami; Ali II Zainami
- Dynasty: Sayfawa dynasty
- Father: Ali I Gaji
- Mother: Aisa

Idris III (Note: Some chronologies of Kanem–Bornu rulers omit the 14th-century Idris II Saradima, lowering the regnal numbers of later rulers of this name. This ruler is then considered Idris II. Some girgams (king lists) mistakenly identify him as Dunama.) (Idrīs bin ʿAlī), called Idris Katagarmabe (Note: This name is also spelled Katakarmabe, Katakarnabi, Katakarmabi, Katakamabi, and Katagarmarambe. In 1912, Richmond Palmer translated the name as "of the land of Katagar", perhaps indicating the origin of his mother.) and Idris Alimi, was mai (ruler) of the Kanem–Bornu Empire in the early 16th century, ruling approximately 1503–1525. Idris is most famous for his military campaigns against the Bilala, which marked the recovery of Kanem, the empire's ancient heartland. The oldest known Kanuri written histories date to Idris's reign.

== Life ==
Idris was a son of mai Ali I Gaji. His mother was named Aisa. Idris became mai in the early 16th century, succeeding his father. Idris's father had stabilised the empire after a period of internal strife that began with the loss of Kanem, the empire's former heartland, to the Bilala in the 14th century. Ruling from Ali's new imperial capital of Ngazargamu, Idris inherited a good position to restore the empire's power and prestige. Later royal chronicles considered Idris to have been a "worthy son and successor of Ali".

Shortly after becoming mai, Idris went on a military campaign against the Bilala in Kanem. During this campaign, Idris defeated the Bilala ruler Dunama bin Salma in battle at Gharni Kiyala, forcing Dunama to flee to "distant places". After this victory, Idris triumphantly entered Njimi, the original capital of the Kanem–Bornu Empire. On his return journey to Bornu, Idris learnt that Dunama's brother A'dim bin Salma had usurped power over the Bilala. Idris thus returned to Kanem and defeated A'dim in battle at Jugulgul. Idris occupied Njimi for a second time and forced A'dim to swear an oath of fealty in the ancient capital. Idris chose not to return the imperial capital to Njimi, instead continuing to use his father's new capital at Ngazargamu. The center of the empire would thus remain in Bornu, west of Lake Chad. The Bilala became imperial vassals and were allowed to continue to govern Kanem as a province.

After his victory over the Bilala, Idris went on a pilgrimage to Mecca. In 1512, Idris sent an embassy to Tripoli. Heinrich Barth, a German explorer who visited Bornu in the 19th century, considered this embassy to indicate "elevated political views" of Idris compared to his predecessors.

Idris ruled for 22 or 23 years. He died at Walama and was succeeded as mai by his son Muhammad VI Aminami.

== Contemporary accounts ==
Idris was a contemporary of the North African diplomat and author Leo Africanus, who mentioned him in his writings. Leo mistakenly referred to Idris as Libran (Ibrahim), perhaps in confusion with one of Idris's predecessors of this name.

Later Kanuri authors mention the existence of a contemporary 16th-century narrative history of Idris Karagarmabe's reign, written by Masfarma Omar ben Othman, the oldest known history written by a Kanuri author. Masfarma Omar ben Othman's work is believed to be lost as no surviving copies or excerpts are known.
