= List of mais of Kanem–Bornu =

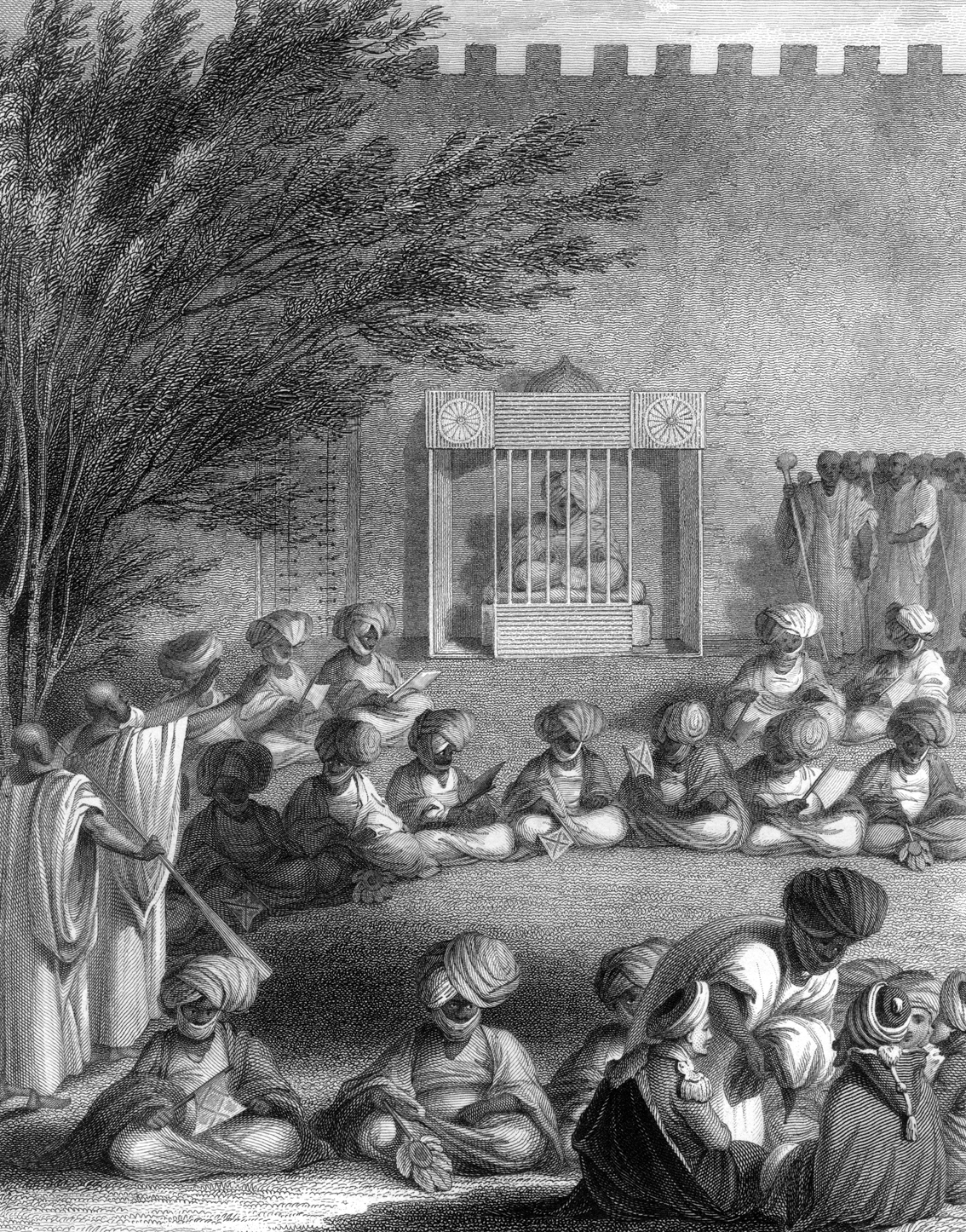
Illustration of mai Ibrahim IV Lefiami and his council at Kafela, by Edward Francis Finden (1823). Ibrahim is seated in the zanadir, a traditional wooden cage used when holding court.

The mai (sometimes equated to king or emperor) was the monarch of the Kanem–Bornu Empire from the foundation of the empire in the 8th century to the abolition of the office in the mid-19th century. From the conversion to Islam in the 11th century and onwards, the mai sometimes adopted additional titles, such as emir, sultan, or caliph. The last mai, Ali V Minargema, was killed in 1846, whereafter the empire was ruled by the shehus.

Records of the mais generally distinguish between an earlier Duguwa dynasty (8th–11th century) and a later Sayfawa dynasty (11th–19th century) but it is unclear whether this distinction is rooted in an actual change in royal lineage or the result of some other factor. The line of rulers is reconstructed by scholars through orally recited sources such as the girgam (the empire's royal chronicle), surviving literary sources, and contemporary sources from other parts of the Islamic world.

== Sources ==
=== Native sources ===
In the Kanem–Bornu Empire, keeping records of the royal lineage was the task of specialists, usually part of the royal court and in service of the mai. Records were passed down both through documents, written in Arabic by court scribes, and in the form of oral history. The history of the mais was referred to as the diwan in its written form and as the girgam in its orally recited form. Girgam is also commonly used as a name for both versions. Another type of important source document are mahrams, grants given by mais to their officials and subjects.

The empire was a literate society by the 12th century at the latest but surviving native literary sources are very limited in number and no known intact documents predate the 16th century. Now lost early documents include a 1392 letter from the mai of Bornu to sultan Barquq of Egypt recorded in Arab sources and a 16th-century narrative history of the reign of mai Idris III Katagarmabe by the Kanuri author Masfarma Omar ben Othman. A surviving document from the 16th century is the works of Ibn Furtu, the Grand Imam of Bornu, which detail the reign of mai Idris IV Alooma and some earlier imperial history. Limited information on Kanem–Bornu history can also be derived from contemporary Arab and North African historians, such as Ibn Sa'id al-Maghribi (1282), Ibn Battuta (1353), Ibn Khaldun (1385), al-Maqrizi (1400), and Leo Africanus (1528).

=== Modern scholarship ===
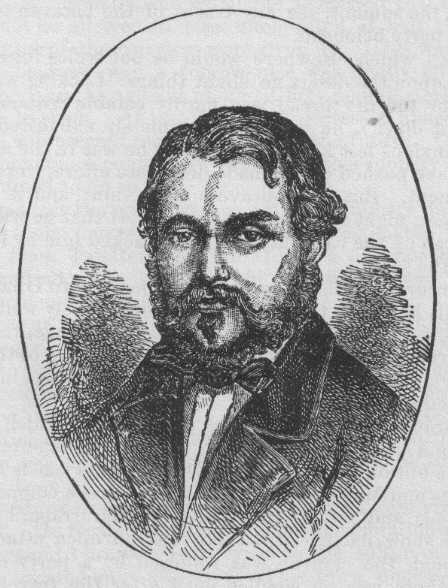
Heinrich Barth (1857)

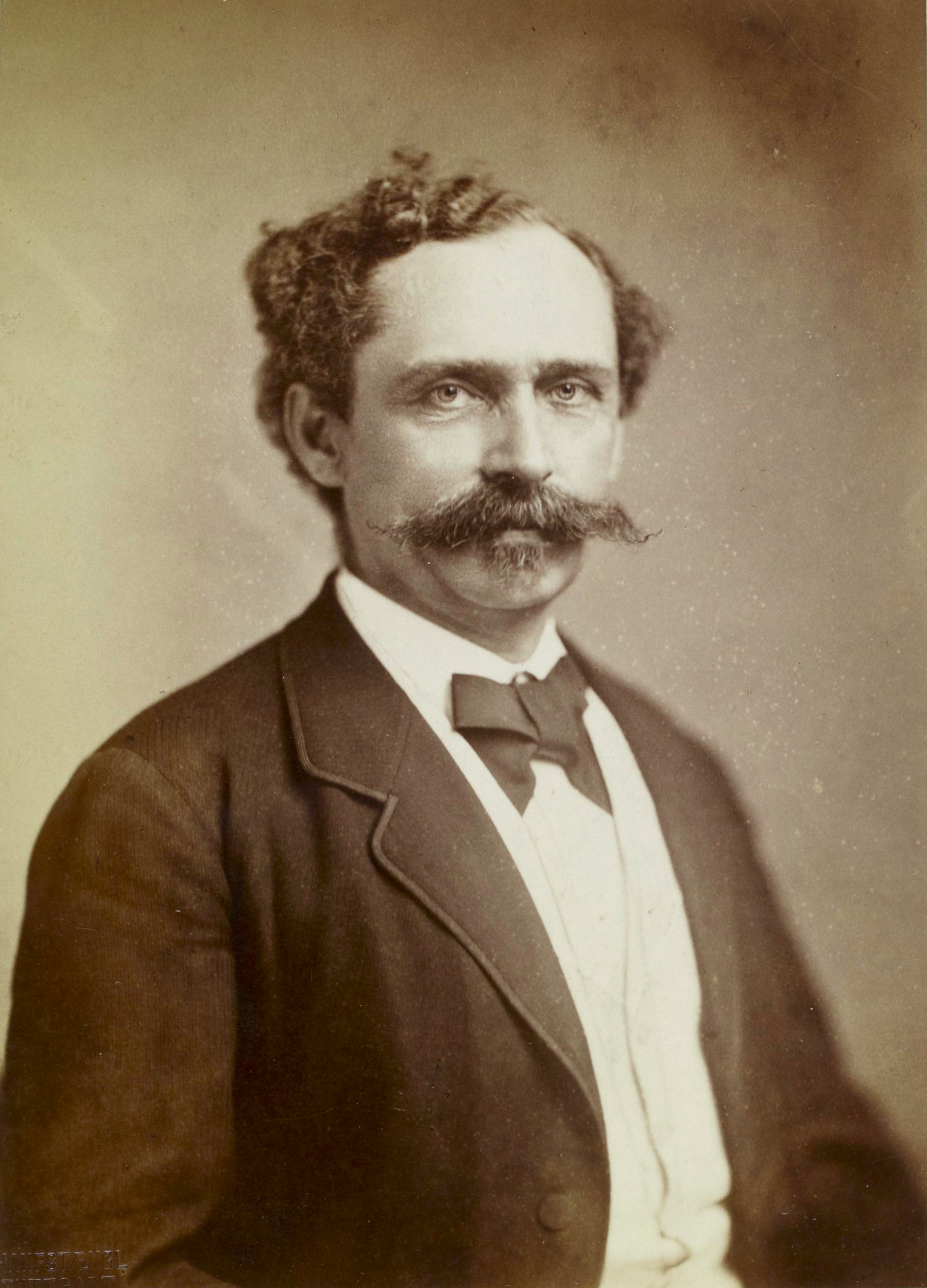
Gustav Nachtigal (1881)

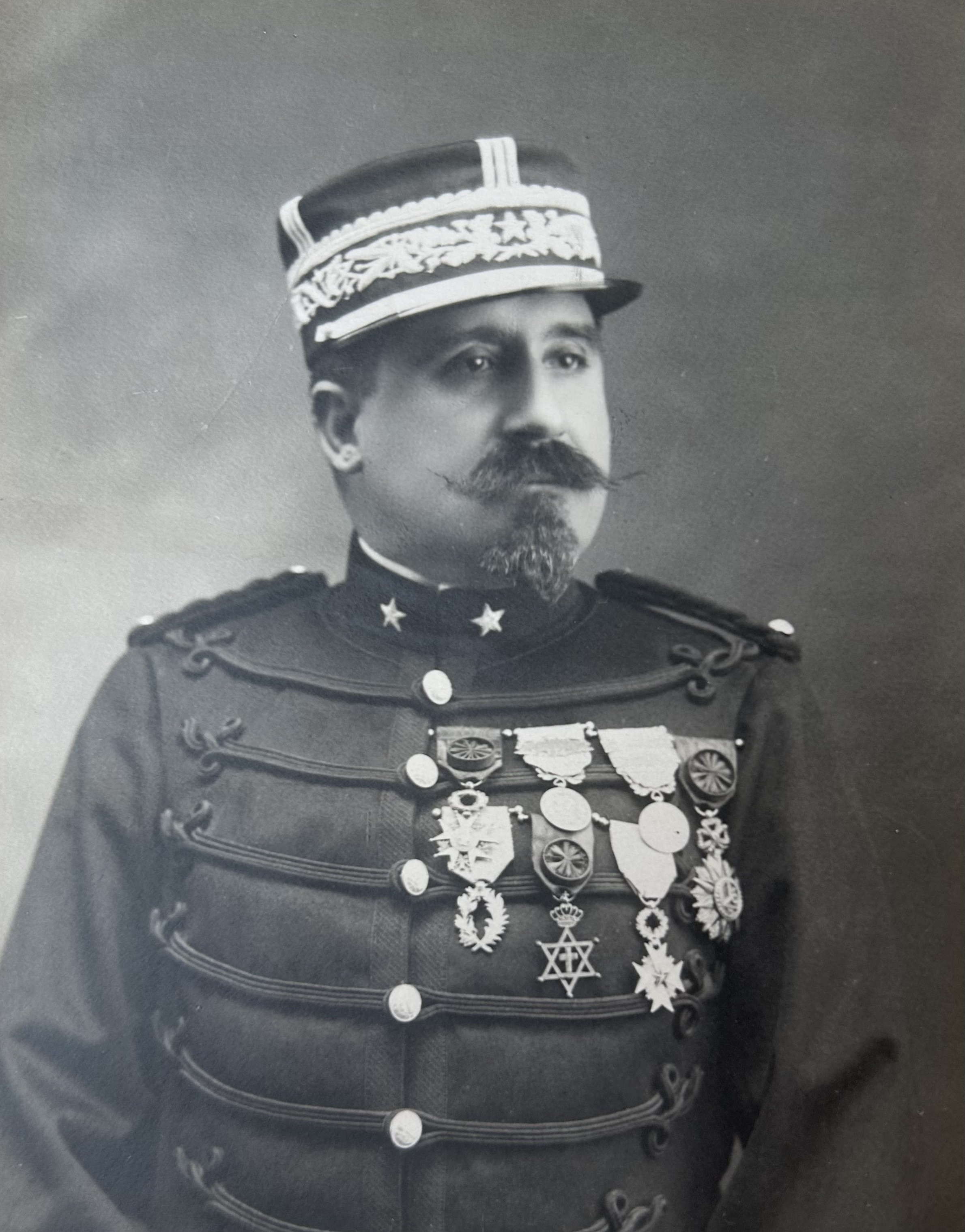
Moïse Landeroin (1911)

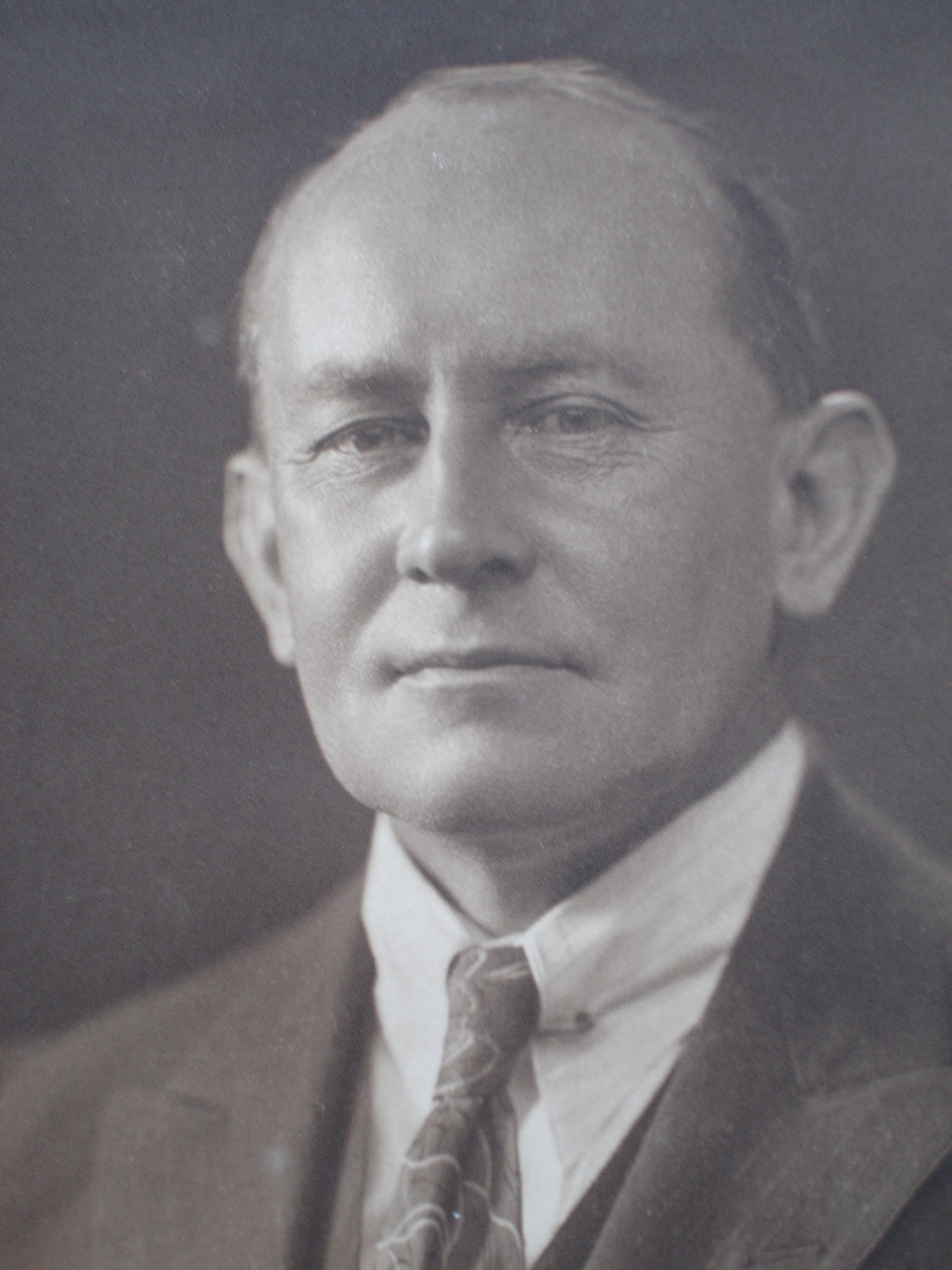
Richmond Palmer (1928, 1936)

Principal early European Bornu scholars, with dates of publication for their works

The earliest European scholar to produce a list of Kanem–Bornu rulers was the German explorer Heinrich Barth, who visited Bornu in the early 1850s. Barth's main source was a diwan which chronicled the entire history of the empire. According to Barth this was an abridged document, though he was unable to find the original larger work. Barth compared his diwan with two additional shorter diwans, as well as other works, most notably those of Ibn Furtu and al-Maqrizi, and found a "striking correspondence" and only "slight discrepancies". Barth was especially surprised by the correspondences with a list of mais in al-Maqrizi's work, which must have been based on material obtained much earlier, possibly from pilgrims or merchants that passed through Egypt.

Scholars after Barth are only partially independent from each other. The next European explorer to compose a list of rulers of Kanem–Bornu was the German explorer Gustav Nachtigal, who visited Bornu in the 1870s. Nachtigal was on the orders of the then-incumbent ruling shehu Umar Kura provided with historical documents by the courtier Ahmed ibn Brahim, and worked out his own list of mais using this material. In the early 20th century, Moïse Landeroin accompanied the 1906–1907 expedition of Jean Tilho to the Chad Basin and collected a large amount of material, including a document that gave a complete timeline of mais and significant world events. From 1904 to 1930, the British colonial administrator Richmond Palmer collected oral traditions and historical documents in northern Nigeria, which were largely published in the volumes Sudanese Memoirs (1928) and Bornu, Sahara and Sudan (1936). Palmer made use of the same source material as Barth and combined it with other sources to produce what he referred to as a "more complete" version. Palmer believed that Nachtigal's list was "very corrupt" and that Landeroin's was "suspect", having used material from secondary 19th-century sources. Palmer's work has since its publication had a strong influence on oral histories in Bornu itself, which can thus no longer be considered independent from European reconstructions.

In the 1930s and 1940s, the French historian Yves Urvoy attempted to synthesize the different sources to produce a list of mais, using Arabic sources, the work of Ibn Furtu, girgams and mahrams published by Palmer, and the lists of Barth, Nachtigal, and Landeroin. Urvoy believed that Barth's version was more reliable than those of Nachtigal and Landeroin, partly due to more alterations between lineages in the line of succession. Urvoy faced the most difficulty in reconstructing the royal line between the middle of the 13th and early 16th century, where the sources disagree the most. Similar efforts to examine and synthesize the source material to produce a list of mais as reliable as possible has since been conducted by Ronald Cohen (1966), Dierk Lange (1977), and Augustin Holl (2000).

Since girgams give only regnal years, not absolute dates, estimated dates for the reigns of the mais are derived from counting back from the known death dates of the late rulers and comparing with mais mentioned in contemporary Arab documents. Differences between modern transcriptions and translations of girgams may derive from scribal errors, faulty memories during oral recital, and faulty translations by Arab and European scholars. Many of the Kanuri names in the girgams are attributes, such as Selema ("black") and Dunama ("strong"), and may at least in some cases reflect later nicknames and not the contemporary names for rulers.

== Duguwa dynasty (c. 700–1085) ==
=== History ===
The original royal dynasty of Kanem is called Duguwa in Kanuri and Banū Dūkū in Arabic. Kanem was established c. 700 and its original rulers probably belonged to the Zaghawa people, pastoralists from the Ennedi Plateau, who are referred to as the rulers of the empire in 9th–11th century Arab sources. Their dynasty has thus also been called the "Zaghawa dynasty" by modern scholars. Through intermingling with other ethnic groups in the region, the Zaghawa of Kanem are believed to have given rise to the Kanembu people. Modern scholars thus variously identify the Duguwa mais as Zaghawa or Kanembu. Islam reached Kanem in the mid-8th or 9th century and the Duguwa dynasty converted to Islam in the 11th century under mai Hu, the tenth mai.

All known records of the Duguwa mais were written down centuries later, after Islam had been long established and the succeeding Sayfawa dynasty ruled. In the girgam, the Sayfawa are contradictorily described as a new dynasty and genealogically connected to the Duguwa. The line of mais is given an invented Arabised origin legend in the girgam by equating the first mai, Susam, to the 6th-century Himyarite prince Sayf ibn Dī Yazan. Because of the long timespan that separates the Duguwa mais from recorded history, and there being little historical evidence for their existence outside of the girgam, some scholars treat the entire history as legendary. Cohen (1966) contends that there is little evidence that any of the Duguwa mais have "any real historical validity".

=== List ===
Reign lengths and relations follow comparative tables of different sources by Cohen (1966). There is a high degree of agreement on the names and sequence of the Duguwa mais in the sources. The only major disagreements are the omission of Adyoma (#7) by both Nachtigal and Landeroin (though both nevertheless include the name as the father of Bulu) and Landeroin adding an additional mai before Susam, Abdallah ben Aïssata, who Landeroin stated ruled only for "a few days", omitted in all other lists. There are also minor disagreements on regnal lengths, (Note: Mostly variations of just 1–2 regnal years, though there are some greater differences. Biram's reign is given as 16 years by Barth and Landeroin but as 10 years by Nachtigal. The reign of Duku is given as 52 years by Landeroin and 51 years by Urvoy, whereas Barth and Nachtigal give impossible dates of 250 and 205 years, respectively. Barth gives a similar 250-year reign to Katuri, though the others give Katuri around 20 years. Nachtigal gives both Hu and Selema I 62-year reigns whereas the others give both mais 4-year reigns.) parentage, (Note: Barth gives Susam's father as Dhu Yazan, generally accepted by later authors, whereas Nachtigal gives Hasan and Landeroin gives Abdallah. Nachtigal states that Arki was the brother of his predecessor Bulu (and a son of Adyoma), whereas all other authors place Arki as Bulu's son. Spellings of the names of the mothers of the mais vary between the sources. The name Aisa is given to Susam's mother by Palmer and to Biram's mother by Barth and Urvoy. Fukalshi is given as the mother of Aritse by Barth but as the mother of Fune by Urvoy.) and name variations (Note: Mostly slight variations, such as Duku, Dougou, and Dugu. Notable disagreements are Palmer naming Arki as Arkaman and Nachtigal naming Duku as Dunama.) of mais. Dates are sometimes given for the reigns of the Duguwa mais but most authors omit dates due to the uncertainties involved.

No.	Name	Reign	Relation	Notes
1	Susam (or Sef)	20 years	–	Credited with establishing the empire and the royal line. Connected to the 6th-century Himyarite prince Sayf ibn Dī Yazan in Islamic sources.
2	Biram (or Ibrahim)	10 or 16 years	Son of Susam	
3	Duku (or Dugu)	51–52 years (Note: Barth gives an impossible 250 years. Nachtigal gives 205 years.)	Son of Biram	Source of the names Duguwa and Banū Dūkū. Sometimes alternatively identified as the first mai. (Note: In Barth's account, Duku's father Biram is called "the father of the sultan", which Barth took to suggest that Duku was the first actual monarch of the dynasty. This is despite Barth also writing that Sef (Susam) came to Kanem, founded the dynasty, and ruled over "several tribes".)
4	Fune	58–60 years	Son of Duku	Barth calls Fune "a powerful and successful prince".
5	Aritse (or Hartso)	49–50 years	Son of Fune	
6	Katuri	19–20 years (Note: Barth gives an impossible 250 years.)	Son of Aritse	
7	Adyoma (or Boyoma, Wayama)	20 or 58 years	Son of Katuri	
8	Bulu	16 years	Son of Adyoma	
9	Arki	42–44 years	Son of Bulu or Adyoma	Extended imperial territory north into the Sahara. Claimed to have settled hundreds of slaves in the lands north of Kanem.
10	Hu (or Hawwa)	4 or 62 years	Son/daughter of Arki	The first Muslim ruler of Kanem. Possibly a woman.
11	Selema I (or Abd al-Jalil, Abdullah)	4 or 62 years	Son of Hu	

== Sayfawa dynasty (1085–1846) ==
=== History ===
The second royal dynasty is called Sayfawa or Sēfuwa in Kanuri and Banū Ḥummay or Banū Sayf in Arabic. According to the girgam and other sources, the Sayfawa dynasty began with the accession of the twelfth mai, Hummay. The girgam connects the dynastic shift to Hummay and his descendants "professing Islam" and not an actual break in the royal line, also designating Hummay as the son of his predecessor Selema. It may thus be misleading to speak of the Duguwa and Sayfawa dynasties as separate lineages. The girgam's explanation of Islam being the distinction between the dynasties is incorrect since the last two Duguwa mais were also Muslim. Different alternate explanations have been proposed by modern scholars. Hummay might have overthrown Selema and could have been an unrelated figure falsely inserted in the royal line in the girgam. Dewière (2024) speculated that the distinction could instead be that the last two Duguwa mais may have been Ibadi Muslim, whereas Hummay and his descendants were Sunni Muslim.

The Sayfawa dynasty ruled continuously from the 11th to the 19th century, a period of nearly 800 years, placing them among the longest-lasting ruling dynasties in history. The Sayfawa lost Kanem to the Bilala in the 14th century and were forced to relocate west to Bornu, a former tributary territory, hence the name Kanem–Bornu. Bornu continued to remain the heartland of the empire even after Kanem was recovered in the 16th century. Intermarriages between the Kanembu people and the local Sao in Bornu may have given rise to the modern-day Kanuri people. Modern scholars thus variously identify the Sayfawa mais as Kanembu or Kanuri.

=== List ===
Reign lengths and relations follow comparative tables of different sources by Cohen (1966). The names and sequence of the Sayfawa mais differs at several points between the sources, especially from the middle 13th century to early 16th century. Dates for the reigns of the Sayfawa rulers derive from scholars adding together regnal years per the sources and counting backwards from known events, such as the capture of Ngazargamu by the Fulani in 1808 (which was shortly followed by mai Ahmad Alimi's abdication to his son Dunama IX Lefiami). Despite disagreements between sources, there is general agreement on the rough timeframes that the mais ruled. As an example, nearly all sources place the first Sayfawa mai, Hummay, in the late 11th century. (Note: Barth (1857): 1086–1097, Nachtigal (1881): 1129–1151, Landeroin (1911): 1070–1093. The dates 1085–1097, based on Barth's count, have been favored by most later authors, such as Palmer (1936), Urvoy (1949), Stewart (1989), and Bosworth (2012).) The approximate dates in the list below largely follow Bosworth (2012). A comparative table of dates given by different authors for each mai can be found after the list.

No.	Name	Reign	Approximate dates	Relation	Notes
12	Hummay	12 or 22–23 years	c. 1085–1097	Son of Selema I (?) (Note: Every source other than Nachtigal gives Hummay's father as Selema. Nachtigal names his father as Biri.)	Died in Egypt while on the Hajj.
13	Dunama I Umemi	53–55 years	c. 1097–1151	Son of Hummay	Murdered in Egypt while on the Hajj.
14	Biri I Uthman	26–27 years	c. 1151–1177	Son of Dunama I	Initially ruled under the regency of his mother Fasama.
15	Abdullah I Bikur	14–17 years	c. 1177–1194	Son of Biri I	
16	Selema II (or Abd al-Jalil)	20–28 years	c. 1194–1221	Son of Abdullah I	
17	Dunama II Dibalemi	14 or 38–44 years	c. 1221–1259	Son of Selema II	Increased Islamisation of the empire and suppression of pagan cults. Brought Kanem to the height of its power, commanding 40,000 horsemen and justifying conquests in the name of jihad. Flourishing trade with North Africa.
18	Kade I Aujami	7, 18–19, or 29 years	Unclear dates and sequence	Son of Dunama II	Period of succession conflict between the sons of Dunama II Dibalemi.
19	Biri II Ibrahim (or Kashim Biri, Uthman)	16–17 or 20–21 years (?)	Unclear dates and sequence	Son of Dunama II	Period of succession conflict between the sons of Dunama II Dibalemi.
20	Jalil (or Biri? (Note: Nachtigal records a mai named Biri as the immediate successor of Dunama II, apparently his father. He is not the same figure as Biri II Ibrahim, who Nachtigal lists separately, and is omitted in all other sources. Cohen (1966) connects this Biri to Jalil, proposing that Biri was his Kanuri name and Jalil was his Arabic name.))	0–1 years	Unclear dates and sequence	Son of Dunama II	Period of succession conflict between the sons of Dunama II Dibalemi.
21	Dirke Kelem	19 or 28 years	Unclear dates and sequence	Son of Dunama II	Period of succession conflict between the sons of Dunama II Dibalemi.
22	Ibrahim I Nikale	1 year or 20–21 years	c. 1290–1311	Son of Biri II Ibrahim	Defeated an uprising by one of his own sons. Eventually murdered and thrown in the Wau River.
23	Abdullah II Kademi	4–21 years	c. 1311–1322	Son of Kade I	Barth refers to Abdullah II as a just ruler, who defeated the murderers and rivals of Ibrahim I.
24	Selema III	1–5 years	c. 1322–1326	Son of Abdullah II	A prolonged conflict with the Sao, southwest of Lake Chad, began under Selema. The wars claimed the lives of Selema and three of his brothers, who all reigned in quick succession.
25	Kure I Gana	7 months or 1–2 years	c. 1326–1327	Son of Abdullah II	A prolonged conflict with the Sao, southwest of Lake Chad, began under Selema. The wars claimed the lives of Selema and three of his brothers, who all reigned in quick succession.
26	Kure II Kura	8 months or 1 year	c. 1327–1328	Son of Abdullah II	A prolonged conflict with the Sao, southwest of Lake Chad, began under Selema. The wars claimed the lives of Selema and three of his brothers, who all reigned in quick succession.
27	Muhammad I Kure	1–2 years	c. 1328–1329	Son of Abdullah II	A prolonged conflict with the Sao, southwest of Lake Chad, began under Selema. The wars claimed the lives of Selema and three of his brothers, who all reigned in quick succession.
28	Idris I Nikalemi	24–25 years	c. 1329–1353	Son of Ibrahim I	
29	Dawud Nikalemi	10–13 years	c. 1353–1363	Son of Ibrahim I	Beginning of intense conflicts with the Bilala in the east.
30	Uthman I	8 months or 1–4 years	c. 1363–1366	Son of Dawud	Period of succession conflict between the sons of Idris I and Dawud and war with the Bilala. The Bilala invaded the core territory of the empire and the wars claimed the lives of three mais, who ruled in quick succession.
31	Uthman II	2 years	c. 1366–1368	Son of Idris I	Period of succession conflict between the sons of Idris I and Dawud and war with the Bilala. The Bilala invaded the core territory of the empire and the wars claimed the lives of three mais, who ruled in quick succession.
32	Abubakar Liyatu	9 months or 1 year	c. 1368–1369	Son of Dawud	Period of succession conflict between the sons of Idris I and Dawud and war with the Bilala. The Bilala invaded the core territory of the empire and the wars claimed the lives of three mais, who ruled in quick succession.
33	Idris II Saradima (?) (Note: Dunama III is recorded by Nachtigal and Landeroin, but not by Barth or Palmer. Nachtigal and Landeroin also record another mai with similar ancestry, Idris Saradima. Lange (1984) and Stewart (1989) omit both Dunama and Idris. Urvoy (1941) listed Dunama and Idris as possible co-rulers. Cohen (1966) stated that their absence in Barth and Palmer's lists suggest that Dunama and Idris were only vaguely remembered by the 19th century, and considered it possible that they were the same person, that one of them reigned briefly during the reign of the other, or that neither actually reigned. Bosworth (2012) lists Idris "and/or" Dunama among the rulers of Kanem–Bornu.)	7–8 years	c. 1369–1376	Son/grandson of Dawud	
34	Dunama III (?)	7–8 years	c. 1369–1376	Grandson of Dawud	
35	Umar I Idrismi	4–11 years	c. 1376–1387	Son of Idris I	Lost Kanem to the Bilala and re-centered the empire in Bornu, a former tributary territory west of Lake Chad.
36	Saʽid	0–1 years	c. 1387–1388	Son of Idris I (Note: Nearly all sources agree that Saʽid was a son of Idris I. Barth however designates Saʽid as a usurper of unknown origin. Lange (1984) on unstated grounds designated Saʽid as a son of Dawud.)	Century-long chaotic period of civil strife, conflict with the Bilala, and civil wars between different branches of the imperial family. The different conflicts claim the lives of many mais, who were rarely able to secure long reigns. The empire lacks a permanent capital in Bornu, with the court of the mai constantly moving from one site to another. Little information survives from this time.
37	Muhammad II Manza	1 year	c. 1388–1389	Son of Idris I	Century-long chaotic period of civil strife, conflict with the Bilala, and civil wars between different branches of the imperial family. The different conflicts claim the lives of many mais, who were rarely able to secure long reigns. The empire lacks a permanent capital in Bornu, with the court of the mai constantly moving from one site to another. Little information survives from this time.
38	Kade II Afunu	1 year	c. 1389–1390	Son of Idris I	Century-long chaotic period of civil strife, conflict with the Bilala, and civil wars between different branches of the imperial family. The different conflicts claim the lives of many mais, who were rarely able to secure long reigns. The empire lacks a permanent capital in Bornu, with the court of the mai constantly moving from one site to another. Little information survives from this time.
39	Biri III Uthman (or Uthman Biri)	32–33 years	c. 1390–1422	Son of Idris I	Century-long chaotic period of civil strife, conflict with the Bilala, and civil wars between different branches of the imperial family. The different conflicts claim the lives of many mais, who were rarely able to secure long reigns. The empire lacks a permanent capital in Bornu, with the court of the mai constantly moving from one site to another. Little information survives from this time.
40	Uthman III Kalinumuwa	0–1 years	c. 1422–1423	Son of Dawud	Century-long chaotic period of civil strife, conflict with the Bilala, and civil wars between different branches of the imperial family. The different conflicts claim the lives of many mais, who were rarely able to secure long reigns. The empire lacks a permanent capital in Bornu, with the court of the mai constantly moving from one site to another. Little information survives from this time.
41	Dunama IV	2–4 years	c. 1423–1425	Son of Umar I	Century-long chaotic period of civil strife, conflict with the Bilala, and civil wars between different branches of the imperial family. The different conflicts claim the lives of many mais, who were rarely able to secure long reigns. The empire lacks a permanent capital in Bornu, with the court of the mai constantly moving from one site to another. Little information survives from this time.
42	Abdullah III Dakumuni	7–9 years	c. 1425–1433	Son of Umar I	Century-long chaotic period of civil strife, conflict with the Bilala, and civil wars between different branches of the imperial family. The different conflicts claim the lives of many mais, who were rarely able to secure long reigns. The empire lacks a permanent capital in Bornu, with the court of the mai constantly moving from one site to another. Little information survives from this time.
43	Ibrahim II	7–8 years	c. 1433–1440	Son of Uthman III (?) (Note: The girgam only states that he was a son of "Uthman". Uthman III is closest in time and was designated as the most likely option by Lange (1984).)	Century-long chaotic period of civil strife, conflict with the Bilala, and civil wars between different branches of the imperial family. The different conflicts claim the lives of many mais, who were rarely able to secure long reigns. The empire lacks a permanent capital in Bornu, with the court of the mai constantly moving from one site to another. Little information survives from this time.
44	Kade III	1–7 years	c. 1440–1444	Son of Uthman III (?)	Century-long chaotic period of civil strife, conflict with the Bilala, and civil wars between different branches of the imperial family. The different conflicts claim the lives of many mais, who were rarely able to secure long reigns. The empire lacks a permanent capital in Bornu, with the court of the mai constantly moving from one site to another. Little information survives from this time.
45	Biri IV	1–6 years	c. 1444–1445	Son of Dunama III or IV	Century-long chaotic period of civil strife, conflict with the Bilala, and civil wars between different branches of the imperial family. The different conflicts claim the lives of many mais, who were rarely able to secure long reigns. The empire lacks a permanent capital in Bornu, with the court of the mai constantly moving from one site to another. Little information survives from this time.
46	Dunama V Ahmad (or Ahmad Dunama)	4 years	c. 1445–1449	Son of Biri III	Century-long chaotic period of civil strife, conflict with the Bilala, and civil wars between different branches of the imperial family. The different conflicts claim the lives of many mais, who were rarely able to secure long reigns. The empire lacks a permanent capital in Bornu, with the court of the mai constantly moving from one site to another. Little information survives from this time.
47	Muhammad III	5 months or 1–5 years	c. 1449–1450	Unknown (Note: Nachtigal and Landeroin name Muhammad III's father as Abdullah. Lange (1984) proposed that Muhammad III was a son of Biri III Uthman.)	Century-long chaotic period of civil strife, conflict with the Bilala, and civil wars between different branches of the imperial family. The different conflicts claim the lives of many mais, who were rarely able to secure long reigns. The empire lacks a permanent capital in Bornu, with the court of the mai constantly moving from one site to another. Little information survives from this time.
48	Amarma (or Hummay)	1–2 years	c. 1450–1451	Unknown (Note: Barth records that Amarma was the son of Aisa, daughter of Uthman (but not which Uthman). Nachtigal, Landeroin, and Urvoy all instead designate Amarma as the son of an unspecified Uthman. Lange (1984) proposed that Amarma was a grandson of Biri III Uthman.)	Century-long chaotic period of civil strife, conflict with the Bilala, and civil wars between different branches of the imperial family. The different conflicts claim the lives of many mais, who were rarely able to secure long reigns. The empire lacks a permanent capital in Bornu, with the court of the mai constantly moving from one site to another. Little information survives from this time.
49	Muhammad IV	0–5 years	c. 1451–1456	Son of Kade III	Century-long chaotic period of civil strife, conflict with the Bilala, and civil wars between different branches of the imperial family. The different conflicts claim the lives of many mais, who were rarely able to secure long reigns. The empire lacks a permanent capital in Bornu, with the court of the mai constantly moving from one site to another. Little information survives from this time.
50	Gaji (or Ali)	5–6 years	c. 1456–1461	Unknown (Note: No girgam gives the father of Gaji and different options have been proposed by scholars. Urvoy (1941) proposed Amarma. Lange (1984) proposed Kade III.)	Century-long chaotic period of civil strife, conflict with the Bilala, and civil wars between different branches of the imperial family. The different conflicts claim the lives of many mais, who were rarely able to secure long reigns. The empire lacks a permanent capital in Bornu, with the court of the mai constantly moving from one site to another. Little information survives from this time.
51	Uthman IV	5 or 10–11 years	c. 1461–1466	Son of Kade III	Century-long chaotic period of civil strife, conflict with the Bilala, and civil wars between different branches of the imperial family. The different conflicts claim the lives of many mais, who were rarely able to secure long reigns. The empire lacks a permanent capital in Bornu, with the court of the mai constantly moving from one site to another. Little information survives from this time.
52	Umar II	1–3 years	c. 1466–1467	Son of Abdullah III	Century-long chaotic period of civil strife, conflict with the Bilala, and civil wars between different branches of the imperial family. The different conflicts claim the lives of many mais, who were rarely able to secure long reigns. The empire lacks a permanent capital in Bornu, with the court of the mai constantly moving from one site to another. Little information survives from this time.
53	Muhammad V	3 or 5 years	c. 1467–1470	Son of Muhammad III (?)	Century-long chaotic period of civil strife, conflict with the Bilala, and civil wars between different branches of the imperial family. The different conflicts claim the lives of many mais, who were rarely able to secure long reigns. The empire lacks a permanent capital in Bornu, with the court of the mai constantly moving from one site to another. Little information survives from this time.
54	Ali I Gaji	27–28 or 33–34 years	c. 1470–1503	Son of Dunama V	Stabilised the empire and founded Ngazargamu, the first substantial capital since the loss of Kanem.
55	Idris III Katagarmabe	22–23 years	c. 1503–1525	Son of Ali I	Defeated the Bilala twice and restored imperial control over Kanem, though the Bilala were allowed to continue to govern the land as vassals. The imperial center remained in Bornu.
56	Muhammad VI Aminami	15, 19, or 24 years	c. 1525–1544	Son of Idris III	Led several victorious military campaigns, one of the empire's most powerful rulers.
57	Ali II Zainami	1 year or 5 years	c. 1544–1545	Son of Idris III	
58	Dunama VI Muhammad	9 or 16–22 years	c. 1545–1555	Son of Muhammad VI or Idris III	Renewed conflict with the Bilala, though they were defeated and reduced to vassals again.
59	Abdullah IV Dunamami	6–8 years	c. 1555–1563	Son of Dunama VI	May have ruled under the regency of his uncle Ali Fannami.
60	Aissa Koli	7–8 years	c. 1563–1570	Daughter of Ali II, Dunama VI, or Muhammad VI	Became ruler in the absence of obvious male heirs.
61	Idris IV Alooma	32–36 or 51 years	c. 1570–1603	Son of Ali II	Brought the empire to the height of its power, partly with the aid of Ottoman mercenaries, instructors, and weapons.
62	Muhammad VII Bukalmarami	10–16 years	c. 1603–1618	Son of Idris IV	
63	Ibrahim III Gumsami	7 years	c. 1618–1625	Son of Idris IV	
64	Umar III al-Maqdisi	16–20 years	c. 1625–1645	Son of Idris IV	
65	Biri V (?) (Note: Landeroin records a mai named Biri as ruling for a single year directly before Ali III. This Biri is omitted in all other sources. Landeroin designates Biri as a son of Umar III and thus a brother of Ali III. Cohen (1966) concludes that Biri was either the same person as Ali, that the presence of the name in the list is a mistake, or that he was an otherwise forgotten figure who ruled briefly before Ali.)	less than a year	c. 1645	Son of Umar III	
66	Ali III Walamma	35–40 years	c. 1645–1680	Son of Umar III	Faced several famines and at least one rebellion. Defeated a combined Tuareg–Kwararafa invasion.
67	Idris V	17–20 years	c. 1680–1699	Son of Ali III	
68	Dunama VII Martemarambi	15–19 years	c. 1699–1717	Son of Ali III	
69	Hamdan Dunamami	12–14, or 23 years	c. 1717–1731	Son of Dunama VII	Fought against the Mandara Kingdom to the southwest of Bornu. A pious and indolent ruler.
70	Muhammad VIII Ergama	13–16 years	c. 1731–1747	Son of Hamdan	
71	Dunama VIII Gana	2–3 years	c. 1747–1750	Son of Muhammad VIII (Note: Every source other than Palmer gives Dunama VIII's father as Muhammad. Palmer names his father as Aman.)	
72	Ali IV Kalirgima	40–46 years	c. 1750–1791	Son of Hamdan	Waged unsuccessful wars against the Mandara Kingdom, contributing to the weakening of the Kanem–Bornu army.
73	Ahmad Alimi	17 years	1791–1808	Son of Ali IV	Faced the Fula jihads. Defeated in battle, whereafter the Bornu heartland was threatened.
74	Dunama IX Lefiami	6–8 years	1808–1811; 1814–1817 (Note: Barth dates Dunama's death to 1817. Brenner (1973) instead suggested 1820–1821, citing better synchronisms with letters by Muhammad al-Amin al-Kanemi. Virtually every scholar has supported Barth's original date, including Nachtigal, Landeroin, Palmer, Urvoy, as well as later authors such as Stewart (1989) and Bosworth (2012).)	Son of Ahmad	Bornu was saved from the Fula jihads with the aid of the scholar and military leader shehu Muhammad al-Amin al-Kanemi, who sidelined the mai. Deposed in favor of Muhammad IX but restored to the throne with al-Kanemi's aid. Killed after plotting against al-Kanemi.
75	Muhammad IX Ngileruma	3–4 years	1811–1814	Son of Ali IV	Made mai by courtiers displeased with al-Kanemi's great influence under Dunama.
76	Ibrahim IV Lefiami	28–29 years	1817–1846	Son of Ahmad	Puppet mai under al-Kanemi and al-Kanemi's son Umar Kura. Killed while attempting to take power in a civil war.
77	Ali V Minargema	40 days	1846	Son of Ibrahim IV	Briefly succeeded his father but was also defeated and killed.

Comparative table of dates by different scholars
No. in list	Mai	Barth (1857)	Nachtigal (1881)	Landeroin (1911)	Palmer (1936)	Urvoy (1941)	Lange (1984)	Stewart (1989)	Bosworth (2012)
Most authors roughly follow the order of mais as given by Barth (1857). Nachtigal (1881) and Landeroin (1911) diverge from Barth's order and the place of mais in their sequences is therefore indicated with a number in bold before their dates.
12	Hummay	1086–1097	(**11**) 1129–1151	(**11**) 1070–1093	1085–1097	1085–1097	1075–1086	1085–1097	1085–1097
13	Dunama I Umemi	1098–1150	(**12**) 1151–1205	(**12**) 1093–1148	1098–1151	1097–1150	1086–1140	1097–1150	1097–1151
14	Biri I Uthman	1151–1176	(**13**) 1205–1232	(**13**) 1148–1175	1151–1177	1150–1176	1140–1166	1150–1176	1151–1174
15	Abdullah I Bikur	1177–1193	(**14**) 1232–1246	(**14**) 1175–1190	1177–1194	1176–1193	1166–1182	1176–1194	1174–1194
16	Selema II	1194–1220	(**15**) 1246–1266	(**15**) 1190–1210	1194–1221	1193–1210	1182–1210	1194–1221	1194–1221
17	Dunama II Dibalemi	1221–1259	(**16**) 1266–1308	(**16**) 1210–1254	1221–1259	1210–1224	1210–1248	1221–1259	1221–1259
18	Kade I Aujami	1259–1285	(**19**) 1337–1344	(**19**) 1274–1281	1259–1278	1224–1242	1248–1277	1259–1260	?
19	Biri II Ibrahim	1288–1306	(**24**) 1351–1367	(**24**) 1287–1304	1279–1300 (Note: Palmer records Biri II under the name Uthman.)	1242–1262	1277–1296	1260–1288	?
20	Jalil	Omitted	(**17**) 1308–1309 (?)	(**17**) 1254–1255	Omitted	1262	Omitted	Omitted	?
21	Dirke Kelem	Omitted	(**18**) 1309–1337	(**18**) 1255–1274 (Note: Landeroin records Dirke Kelem under the name Derin Kaloumi.)	Omitted	1262–1281	Omitted	Omitted	?
22	Ibrahim I Nikale	1307–1326	(**25**) 1367–1368	(**25**) 1304–1324	1300–1321	1281–1301	1296–1315	1307–1326	1290–1311
23	Abdullah II Kademi	1326–1345	(**20**) 1344–1348	(**20**) 1281–1285	1321–1342	1301–1320	1315–1335	1326–1346	1311–1322
24	Selema III	1346–1349	(**23**) 1349–1351	(**23**) 1286–1287	1342/1343–1347/1348	1320–1323	1335–1339	1346–1350	1322–1326
25	Kure I Gana	1350	(**22**) 1349	(**22**) 1286	1348–1349	1323–1325	1339–1340	1350–1351	1326–1327
26	Kure II Kura	1351	(**21**) 1348–1349	(**21**) 1285	1349–1350	1325–1326	1340–1341	1351–1352	1327–1328
27	Muhammad I Kure	1352	Omitted	Omitted	1351–1352	1326	1341–1342	1352–1353	1328–1329
28	Idris I Nikalemi	1353–1376	(**34**) 1402–1426	(**35**) 1372–1397	1353–1376	1328–1335	1342–1366	1353–1377	1329–1353
29	Dawud Nikalemi	1377–1386	Omitted	(**27**) 1325–1338	1376–1386	1353–1366	1366–1376	1377–1386	1353–1363
30	Uthman I	1387–1390	(**26**) 1368–1369	(**28**) 1338	1386	1366–1369	1376–1379	1386–1391	1363–1366
31	Uthman II	1391–1392	Omitted	Omitted	Omitted	1369–1371	1379–1381	1391–1392	1366–1368
32	Abubakar Liyatu	1392	(**27**) 1369–1370	(**29**) 1338–1339	1386	1371–1372	1381–1382	1392–1394	1368–1369
33	Dunama III	Omitted	(**29**) 1370–1377	(**26**) 1324–1325	Omitted	1372–1380	Omitted	Omitted	1369–1376
34	Idris II Saradima	Omitted	(**28**) ?	(**30**) 1339–1346	Omitted	1372–1380	Omitted	Omitted	Co-ruler with Dunama III?
35	Umar I Idrismi	1394–1398	(**37**) 1428–1435	(**38**) 1399–1406	1386/1387–1390/1391	1380–1387	1382–1387	1394–1398	1376–1387
36	Saʽid	1398–1399	(**38**) 1435	(**39**) 1406–1407	1391	1387–1388	1387–1388	1398–1399	1387–1388
37	Muhammad II	Omitted	(**35**) 1426–1427	(**36**) 1397–1398	Omitted	Omitted	Omitted	Omitted	1388–1389
38	Kade II Afunu	1399–1400	(**36**) 1427–1428	(**37**) 1398–1399	1391–1392	1388–1389	1388–1389	1399–1400	1389–1390
39	Biri III Uthman	1400–1432	Omitted	Omitted	1392–1424/1425	1389–1421	1389–1421	1400–1432	1390–1422
40	Uthman III Kalinumuwa	1432	Omitted	Omitted	1425	1421–1422	1421–1422	1432–1433	1422–1423
41	Dunama IV	1433–1434	(**39**) 1435–1439	(**40**) 1407–1411	1425–1427	1422–1424	1422–1424	1433–1435	1423–1425
42	Abdullah III Dakumuni	1435–1442	(**40**) 1439–1446	(**41**) 1411–1418	1427–1436	1424–1432	1424–1431	1435–1442	1425–1433
43	Ibrahim II	1442–1450	Omitted	Omitted	1436–1443	1432–1440	1431–1439	1442–1450	1433–1440
44	Kade III	1450–1451	(**30**) 1377–1383	(**31**) 1346–1353	1443–1444	1440–1446	1439–1440	1450–1451	1440–1444
45	Biri IV	Omitted	(**44**) 1455–1461	(**45**) 1427–1433	Omitted	Omitted	Omitted	Omitted	1444–1445
46	Dunama V Ahmad	1451–1455	(**45**) 1461–1465	(**46**) 1433–1437	1444–1448	1446–1450	1440–1444	1451–1455	1445–1449
47	Muhammad III	1455	(**41**) 1446–1451	(**42**) 1418–1423	1448–1450	1450–1451	1444	1455–1456	1449–1450
48	Amarma	1456	(**42**) 1451–1452	(**43**) 1423–1424 (Note: Landeroin records Amarma under the name Oumé, the same name he uses for Hummay.)	1450–1452	1451–1453	1444–1445	1456	1450–1451
49	Muhammad IV	?	(**32**) 1394–1399	(**33**) 1364–1369	1452/1453–1455	1453–1458	1445–1449	1456	1451–1456
50	Gaji	1456–1461	Omitted	Omitted	1455–1461	1458–1463	1449–1454	1456–1461	1456–1461
51	Uthman IV	1461–1466	(**31**) 1383–1394	(**32**) 1353–1364	1461–1466	1463–1473	1454–1459	1461–1466	1461–1466
52	Umar II	1466	(**43**) 1452–1455	(**44**) 1424–1427	1466–1467	?, during first 6 years of Ali I	1459–1460	1466–1467	1466–1467
53	Muhammad V	1467–1471	(**33**) 1399–1402	(**34**) 1369–1372	1467–1472	?, during first 6 years of Ali I	1460–1465	1467–1472	1467–1472
54	Ali I Gaji	1472–1504	(**46**) 1465–1492	(**47**) 1437–1465	1476–1503	1473–1507	1465–1497	1472–1504	1470–1503
55	Idris III Katagarmabe	1504–1526	(**47**) 1492–1515	(**48**) 1465–1488	1503–1526	1507–1529	1497–1515	1504–1526	1503–1525
56	Muhammad VI Aminami	1526–1545	(**48**) 1515–1539	(**49**) 1488–1512	1526/1527–1545	1529–1544	1515–1538	1526–1545	1525–1544
57	Ali II Zainami	1545	(**51**) 1562–1563	(**52**) 1538–1543	1545–1546	1544–1548	Omitted	1545–1546	1544–1546
58	Dunama VI Muhammad	1546–1563	(**49**) 1539–1555	(**50**) 1512–1531	1546–1555	1548–1566	Omitted	1546–1563	1546–1563
59	Abdullah IV Dunamami	1564–1570	(**50**) 1555–1562	(**51**) 1531–1538	1555–1562/1563	1566–1573	Omitted	1563–1570	1563–1569
60	Aissa Koli	Regent for Idris III	Omitted	Omitted	1562/1563–1570	1573–1580	Omitted	1570–1580	Co-ruler with Idris III
61	Idris IV Alooma	1571–1603	(**52**) 1563–1614	(**53**) 1545–1596	1570–1602/1603	1580–1616	Omitted	1580–1603	1569–1603
62	Muhammad VII Bukalmarami	1602–1618	(**53**) 1614–1624	(**54**) 1596–1612	1602/1603–1618	1616–1632	Omitted	1603–1617	1603–1618
63	Ibrahim III Gumsami	1618–1625	(**54**) 1624–1631	(**55**) 1612–1619	1618–1625	1632–1639	Omitted	1617–1625	1618–1625
64	Umar III al-Maqdisi	1625–1645	Omitted	(**56**) 1619–1635	1625–1644	1639–1657	Omitted	1625–1645	1625–1645
65	Biri V	Omitted	Omitted	(**57**) 1635–1636	Omitted	1657	Omitted	Omitted	Omitted
66	Ali III Walamma	1645–1684	(**55**) 1631–1670	(**58**) 1636–1674	1644–1680/1684	1657–1694	Omitted	1645–1685	1645–1684
67	Idris V	1685–1704	(**56**) 1670–1690	(**59**) 1674–1694	1680/1684–1699	1694–1711	Omitted	1685–1704	Omitted
68	Dunama VII Martemarambi	1704–1722	(**57**) 1690–1708	(**60**) 1694–1713	1699–1717	1711–1726	Omitted	1704–1723	1699–1726
69	Hamdan Dunamami	1723–1736	(**58**) 1708–1731	(**61**) 1713–1727 (Note: Landeroin records Hamdan under the name Muhammad.)	1717–1731	1726–1738	Omitted	1723–1737	1726–1731
70	Muhammad VIII Ergama	1737–1751	(**59**) 1731–1746	(**62**) 1727–1742	1731–1747	1738–1751	Omitted	1737–1752	1731–1747
71	Dunama VIII Gana	1752–1755	(**60**) 1746–1749	(**63**) 1742–1745	1747–1750	1751–1753	Omitted	1752–1755	1747–1750
72	Ali IV Kalirgima	1755–1793	(**61**) 1749–1793	(**64**) 1745–1791	1750–1791	1753–1793	Omitted	1755–1793	1750–1791
73	Ahmad	1793–1810	(**62**) 1793–1810	(**65**) 1791–1808	1791–1808	1793–1810	Omitted	1793–1808	1791–1808
74	Dunama IX Lefiami	1810–1817	(**63**) 1810–1817	(**66**) 1808–1811; 1814–1817	1808–1811; 1814–1817	1810–1817	Omitted	1808–1810; 1814–1817	1808–1811; 1814–1817
75	Muhammad IX Ngileruma	Omitted	Omitted	(**68**) (Note: Landeroin's ruler #67 is shehu Muhammad al-Amin al-Kanemi.) 1811–1814	1811–1814	Omitted	Omitted	1810–1814	1811–1814
76	Ibrahim IV Lefiami	1818–1846	(**64**) 1818–1846	(**70**) (Note: Landeroin's ruler #69 is Dunama IX Lefiami's second reign.) 1818–1846	1817–1846	Omitted	Omitted	1817–1846	1817–1846
77	Ali V Minargema	Omitted	Omitted	Omitted	1846	Omitted	Omitted	1846	1846

== Later history ==
After the deaths of Ibrahim IV and Ali V, power fully shifted to the shehus and shehu Umar Kura had the office of mai abolished. Survivors of the Sayfawa dynasty either fled from the country or were forced to swear allegiance to the shehu.

Several of the current (non-sovereign) traditional rulers in Nigeria use the style of mai, though the title is in contemporary times considered equivalent to "emir" and lesser in status than the style of shehu, considered equivalent to "supreme emir". Traditional rulers who use the style of mai include the rulers of Bama, Biu, Shani, Askira, Gwoza, and Uba. The traditional town heads of Marte in Borno State, Nigeria claim to represent a surviving branch of the Sayfawa dynasty and use the style of mai. According to some traditions, the Bilala dynasty are a cadet branch of the Sayfawa dynasty.

== Family tree ==
Simplified family tree of the Duguwa and Sayfawa dynasties

Susam c. 700
Biram
Duku
Fune
Aritse
Katuri
Adyoma
Bulu
Arki
Hu
Selema I
Hummay; 1085–1097
Dunama I Umemi; 1097–1151
Biri I Uthman; 1151–1177
Abdullah I Bikur; 1177–1194
Selema II; 1194–1221
Dunama II Dibalemi; 1221–1259
Kade I Aujami; 1259–?	Biri II Ibrahim ?–?	Jalil ?–?	Dirke Kelem ?–1290
Abdullah II Kademi; 1311–1322	Ibrahim I Nikale; 1290–1311
Selema III; 1322–1326	Kure I Gana; 1326–1327	Kure II Kura; 1327–1328	Muhammad I Kure; 1328–1329	Idris I Nikalemi; 1329–1353	Dawud Nikalemi; 1353–1363
Uthman II; 1322–1326	Umar I Idrismi; 1376–1387	Saʽid; 1387–1388	Muhammad II Manza; 1388–1389	Kade II Afunu; 1389–1390	Biri III Uthman; 1390–1422	Uthman I 1363–1366	Abubakar Liyatu; 1368–1369	Uthman III Kalinumuwa; 1422–1423	Idris II Saradima; 1369–1376	Ibrahim
Dunama IV; 1423–1425	Abdullah III Dakumuni; 1425–1433	Dunama V Ahmad; 1445–1449	Muhammad III (Note: Speculative parentage, per Lange (1984).); 1449–1450	Aisa	Ibrahim II; 1433–1440	Kade III; 1440–1444	Dunama III; 1369–1376
Biri IV; 1444–1445	Umar II; 1466–1467	Ali I Gaji; 1470–1503	Muhammad V 1467–1470	Amarma (Note: Speculative grandparentage, per Lange (1984).); 1450–1451	Muhammad IV; 1451–1456	Gaji; 1456–1461	Uthman IV; 1461–1466
Idris III Katagarmabe; 1503–1525
Muhammad VI Aminami; 1525–1544	Ali II Zainami; 1544–1545
Dunama VI Muhammad; 1545–1555	Aissa Koli; 1563–1570	Idris IV Alooma; 1570–1603
Abdullah IV Dunamami; 1555–1563	Muhammad VII Bukalmarami; 1603–1618	Ibrahim III Gumsami; 1618–1625	Umar III al-Maqdisi; 1625–1645
Biri V 1645	Ali III Walamma; 1645–1680
Idris V 1680–1699	Dunama VII Martemarambi; 1699–1717
Hamdan Dunamami; 1717–1731
Muhammad VIII Ergama; 1731–1747	Ali IV Kalirgima; 1750–1791
Dunama VIII Gana; 1747–1750	Ahmad Alimi; 1791–1808	Muhammad IX Ngileruma; 1811–1814
Dunama IX Lefiami; 1808–1811, 1814–1817	Ibrahim IV Lefiami; 1817–1846
Ali V Minargema; 1846
