= Abdullah IV Dunamami =

Mai of the Kanem–Bornu Empire
- Reign: 16th century (6–8 years) c. 1555–1563 (Note: The king lists (girgams) and chronicles translated in the 19th–20th centuries (by Barth, Nachtigal, Landeroin, Palmer, Urvoy) broadly agree that Abdullah ruled for seven years. Landeroin specifies a slightly shorter 6 years and 10 months. Due to differing dates and calculations for other mais, various dates have been given for Abdullah's reign, including 1564–1570 (Barth), 1555–1562/1563 (Palmer), 1566–1573 (Urvoy), 1531–1538 (Landeroin), and 1555–1562 (Nachtigal). Later authors have also assigned various dates, such as 1563–1570 (Stewart, 1989) and 1563–1569 (Bosworth, 2012).)
- Predecessor: Dunama VI Muhammad
- Successor: Aissa Koli
- Regent: Ali Fannami (?)
- Died: c. 1563; Ngazargamu or "Kítaba", Bornu
- Dynasty: Sayfawa dynasty
- Father: Dunama VI Muhammad

Abdullah IV (Note: Also recorded as Dala.) (ʿAbdallāh bin Dunama Muḥammad), called Abdullah Dunamami, was mai (ruler) of the Kanem–Bornu Empire in the mid-16th century, ruling approximately 1555–1563, perhaps under the regency of his uncle Ali Fannami.

== Life ==
Abdullah was a son of mai Dunama VI Muhammad, who he succeeded as mai in the mid-16th century. Some girgams (king lists) add a brother of Dunama VI, Ali Fannami, between Dunama and Abdullah IV. Ali is most often interpreted as having served as regent for Abdullah, then suggested to have been too young to rule, though the situation is not clear.

The German explorer Heinrich Barth, who visited Bornu in the 1850s and translated Bornuan royal chronicles, noted that under Abdullah "nothing very remarkable seems to have happened". A seven-year coincided with Abdullah's reign; later chronicles named this famine Sima Azadu. The first settlement of Fula people in Bornu dates to Abdullah's time.

Abdullah ruled for six to eight years. According to Barth, Abdullah died at a site named Kítaba. A girgam translated by Richmond Palmer in 1926 also places Abdullahs' death at Kítaba (though here spelled Kitala) but a girgam translated by Palmer in 1912 instead places his death and burial at Ngazargamu. He was succeeded on the throne by Aissa Koli, whose relation to other rulers of the empire varies depending on the source.
