= Bornu (historical region) =

Precolonial historical region in West Africa, located southwest of Lake Chad

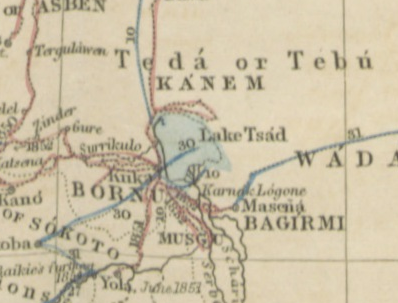
The Lake Chad area, including Bornu, on a 1857 map by August Heinrich Petermann

Bornu or Borno (Note: The name Borno or Bornu appears in sources from the 14th century onwards, connected to the new core territory of the Kanem–Bornu Empire west of Lake Chad, and eventually came to function as the native name for the entire state. Borno is considered the more correct spelling since it more accurately reflects how the name is pronounced in the Kanuri language. The spelling Bornu remains common in historical treatments but is sometimes regarded as a colonial spelling.) is a precolonial historical region in West Africa, located southwest of Lake Chad. In the modern day, most of Bornu is located in northeastern Nigeria (largely in Borno State and Yobe State), with smaller portions also in southern Niger, southern Chad, and northern Cameroon.

Bornu has been inhabited since at least c. 1800 BCE and has yielded archaeological finds belonging to the successive Gajigenna (19th–6th century BCE) and Sao (6th century BCE–14th century) cultures. From the 14th century onwards, Bornu was the heartland of the Kanem–Bornu Empire, which lasted until European colonisation during the Scramble for Africa in the early 20th century.

== Geography ==
In the modern day, most of Bornu is located in northeastern Nigeria, in the Borno and Yobe states. Borno State was created in 1976 and then corresponded to the boundaries of Borno used by the British. Yobe State, formerly the western portion of Borno State, was split off in 1991. Smaller portions of former Bornu fell outside of British control during the Scramble for Africa and are today part of southern Niger, southern Chad, and northern Cameroon.

== Modern demographics ==
Bornu is considered the homeland of the Kanuri people, the largest ethnic group in the region. Bornu is also home to various other groups, such as the Fulani, Hausa, Shuwa, Ngizim, Bolewa, and Karai-karai.

== Prehistory and archaeology ==
=== Gajigenna culture (c. 1800–500 BCE) ===
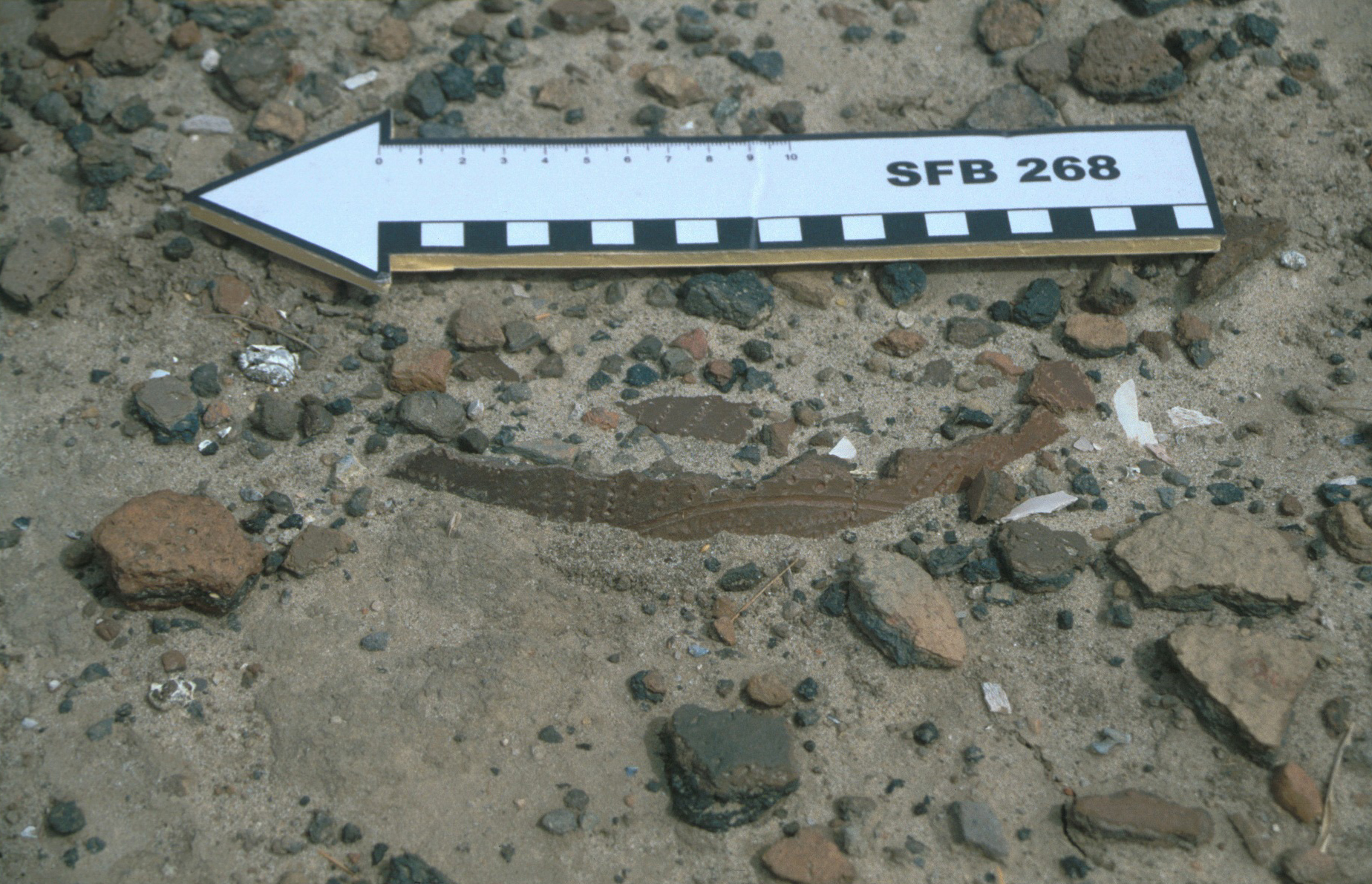
Fragments of a decorated comb from Zilum, Gajigenna culture, c. 500 BCE

Humans lived in the inner Chad Basin at least as far back as the 6th millennium BCE. Archaeology in Bornu has yielded the earliest known figurines from modern-day Nigeria, belonging to the Gajiganna culture. The earliest evidence of the Gajiganna culture, also the earliest evidence of human habitation in Bornu, dates to c. 1800 BCE. The Gajicanna culture is divided into three distinct phases, corresponding to societal and archaeological changes. The first phase (c. 1800–1500 BCE) suggests that the original inhabitants were mobile populations of pastoralists, maybe of Saharan origin. They may have left the Sahara due to increasing drought around 2000 BCE. These pastoralists left small, simple, and stylised figurines of people and animals (mostly bovids).

The second phase of the Gajigenna culture (c. 1500–800 BCE) shows the beginning of sedentary farming communities, visible in the archaeological record through settlement mounds up to four hectares in area. Figurines from this time belong to the same tradition as the earlier phase but are more advanced; human figurines for instance show details like facial features, hairstyles, and headgear. Around 1000 BCE there was a retransition to mobility, as indicated by small and flat sites becoming more common. The third and last phase of the Gajigenna culture (c. 500 BCE) shows the rise of settlements much larger than previously, encompassing areas of ten hectares or more, surrounded by ditches. Settlements from this time indicate large cultural, social, and economic changes. Increases in storage facilities suggest economic surplus and a population increase. Phase III Gajigenna sites, such as Zilum, are part of the same cultural tradition as earlier phases, as indicated by the presence of clay figurines of similar style, size, and appearance.

In total, well over a hundred sites from the Gajiganna culture have been identified. Contemporary with Phase III of the Gajigenna culture, complex settlements also emerged in the area around Walasa, 130 kilometres to the southeast. The Archaeological record around Walasa covers the middle and late first millennium BCE and has yielded sculptural art which differs from Gajigenna art in depicting a variety of animals. Walasa settlements do not have a large number of storage pits nor ditches, differentiating them from the contemporary Gajigenna sites.

=== Sao culture (c. 500 BCE–c. 1380) ===
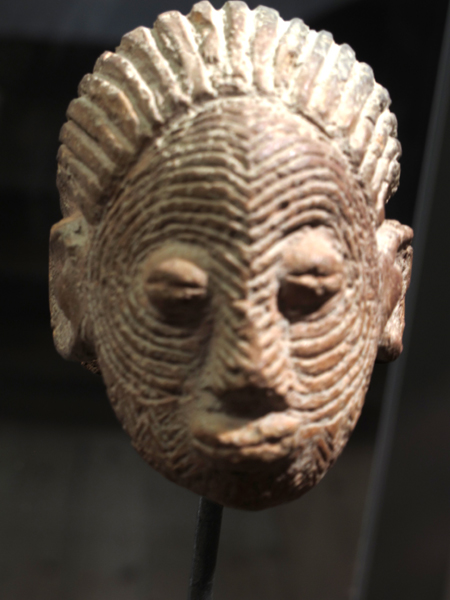
Terracotta head from the Sao culture, 6th century

The Chad Basin acquired iron-smelting technology by the 5th century BCE and experienced increased agricultural activity around that time. The Iron Age probably coincides with the beginning of archaeological finds considered part of the "Sao" culture, which produced artwork stylistically distinct from that of the preceding cultures. The name Sao comes from traditional and mythical sources, which use the name for the indigenous people of Bornu. The earliest references to the Sao in surviving sources date to the 14th century, from chronicles of the Kanem–Bornu Empire. The so-called archaeological "Sao" culture has been identified as such by archaeologists since the 1950s. Breunig, Franke, and Nüsse (2008) noted that the "chronology of the Sao suffers from mixing archaeological data with mythical traditions." It is unclear if Sao in the literary sources refers to a single culture or is an indiscriminate term that refers to various related peoples in the area.

The name Sao might mean "city" or "city-dweller", in reference to the walled towns and villages in which they lived. Traces of settlements identified as Sao are abundant south of Lake Chad in the form of large mounds with ruins of buildings, bronze ornaments, and terracotta sculptures. Sao settlements were built on large mounds in the plains of Bornu, which protected them from flooding during the wet season. Local legends sometimes describe the Sao as giants, owing to the large mortuary vessels they left behind. As was the case for previous art in the region, Sao art consists mostly of figurines of people and animals.

Archaeological evidence suggests that the Sao both warred and traded with other polities, such as Kanem. Finds from the 13th century sometimes include objects with Islamic inscriptions, suggesting cultural interactions but probably not religious conversions.

It is unclear if the Sao had a recognised state structure. By the 13th century, Bornu had become a tributary territory of the Sayfawa, rulers of Kanem. Some evidence suggest that Bornu was a kingdom before the late 14th century. The 13th-century Arab geographer Ibn Sa'id al-Maghribi describes a kingdom west of Lake Chad, probably Bornu, and notes that "the town of Djadja is the residence of a separate kingdom, possessing towns and lands. At present, it belongs to the sultan of Kanem." In the 14th century, al-Maqrizi also regarded Kanem and Bornu as two separate kingdoms, noting that the mai of Kanem held both kingdoms as "the sovereign of Kanem and lord of Bornu". In the 14th century, the kingdoms were apparently separate again as Ibn Fadlallah al-Umari wrote that the Mamluk sultans exchanged letters with both the king of Kanem and the king of Bornu. In African States and Rulers (1989), John Stewart dates an independent kingdom in Bornu to c. 850 – c. 1260. Stewart speculates that this kingdom was established by the "Sao peoples" and became part of the Kanem–Bornu Empire in around 1260.

== Kanem–Bornu Empire (c. 1380–1902) ==
Map of the Kanem–Bornu Empire in 1650

In the 14th century, the Sayfawa dynasty in Kanem came under increasing pressure from the Bilala people, who c. 1380 captured their capital (Njimi) and ousted them from Kanem. Under mai Umar I Idrismi, the Sayfawa relocated across Lake Chad to Bornu and re-established their state there. Their empire as a whole is typically referred to as the Kanem–Bornu Empire after its two main centres of power. The first century of Sayfawa rule in Bornu saw frequent civil wars between branches of the imperial family but the state was stabilised under mai Ali I Gaji in the 15th century, who also established the new capital of Ngazargamu.

The establishment of Sayfawa rule was accompanied by a large-scale migration of people from east of Lake Chad into Bornu, which resulted in conflict with the local Sao, lasting until the 17th century. Some Sao submitted to the Sayfawa and converted to Islam, whereas other fled. Intermarriages between Kanembu people from Kanem and the Sao may have given rise to the Kanuri people in Bornu. Ibn Furtu in the late 16th century recorded mai Idris IV Alooma as expanding Muslim settlements throughout Bornu, leaving little land to the still pagan Sao, alongside various forms of violent suppression. Tradition credits the founding of several states on the periphery of the empire to Sao refugees, the most powerful of which was the Mandara Kingdom, which had become a Muslim state by the 18th century. Several modern groups claim mythical descent from the Sao, such as the Kotoko and the Musgum. By 1800, Islam was widespread in Bornu and the region had become relatively homogenous after centuries of Kanurisation.

Through the efforts of mai Ali I Gaji and his son, mai Idris III Katagarmabe, the Sayfawa had regained much of their power by the early 16th century. By the late 16th and early 17th century, Bornu had become a centre of Islamic learning in central Africa. Military conflicts with neighboring states and groups, changing trade patterns, and the climate effects of the Little Ice Age (16th–19th centuries) contributed to decline in the 17th and 19th centuries. In 1808, Fulani warriors waging the Fula jihads captured and destroyed Ngazargamu, and seized most of the imperial core. Mai Dunama IX Lefiami managed to drive away the invaders with the aid of the scholar and military leader Muhammad al-Amin al-Kanemi. Al-Kanemi's increasing influence gradually made him the de facto ruler of the empire. In 1814 he adopted the style of shehu (sheikh), which was later inherited by his son Umar Kura. In 1846, Umar Kura abolished the office of mai and his family assumed sole power over the empire.

Bornu was conquered by the Sudanese warlord Rabih az-Zubayr in 1893. Rabih established a military dictatorship under himself and his generals. During the Scramble for Africa in 1899, France invaded Rabih's empire. Bolstered by local Bornu forces, the French defeated and killed Rabih at the battle of Kousséri (22 April 1900). The al-Kanemi dynast Sanda Kura was installed as shehu of Bornu in 1900, with French support. Rabih's death created a power vacuum, paving the way for colonial occupation, and both the French and British worked to influence struggles between different claimants. Sanda Kura was soon replaced with his brother Abubakar Garbai and in 1902 the empire was effectively dissolved as its entire territory came under colonial rule, incorporated into the British Northern Nigeria Protectorate, French Chad, and German Kamerun.

== See also ==
- History of West Africa
