= Girgam =

Arabic royal chronicle of the Kanem–Bornu Empire

The Girgam (or Diwan) is the royal chronicle of the Kanem–Bornu Empire, written in Arabic. Girgam is also used as the name for written historical records in some kingdoms west of Bornu, including Daura, Fika and Mandara, defined as "chronicle or 'list of ancestors'" or simply "date".

"A very meagre and incorrect abridgement" of the Girgam was provided by a local associated with the Sefuwa dynasty to the German traveller Heinrich Barth in 1851, in Kukawa, the nineteenth century capital of Bornu. Barth reported that a translation was published in 1852.

It provides the names of 69 rulers of Kanem-Bornu and some supplementary information concerning the length of their reigns, their ascendancy, and often some events of their reigns. The information given by several Arab authors (Ibn Sa'īd, al-Maqrīzī and al-Qalqashandī) confirm the validity of the data provided by the Girgam. On the basis of these sources, a nearly accurate chronology of the rulers of Kanem-Bornu can be established between the tenth and the nineteenth centuries. Since the fall of the Sefuwa dynasty in 1846, "the new dynasty of the Kánemíyín [Kānemī] endeavours to obliterate as much as possible the memory of the old Kanúri [Sefuwa] dynasty, and has assiduously destroyed all its records wherever they could be laid hold of."

== See also ==
- Bornu Empire
- Kanem Empire
- Sayfawa dynasty

== Literature ==
- Barth, Heinrich (1857): Travels and Discoveries in North and Central Africa. Vol. II, New York, pp. 15–35, 581-602.
- Barth, Henry (1857): Travels and Discoveries in North and Central Africa. Vol. II, London: Longman, Brown, Green, Longmans, & Roberts, pp. 253-268.
- Blau, Otto (1852): Chronik der Sultâne von Bornu. Zeitschrift der Deutschen Morgenländischen Gesellschaft, p. 305-330. (German translation of the Dīwān. This source is referenced by Henry Barth (1857 p. 253 footnote)).
- Palmer, Herbert R. (1936): The Bornu Sahara and Sudan. London 1936 (English translation of the Dīwān S. 89-95
- Lavers, John (1982): "Review of 'Le dīwān des sultans du Kanem-Bornu', Journal of African History, 23, 122-3.
- Nehemia Levtzion and John Hopkins (1981): Corpus of Early Arabic Sources for West African History, Cambridge.
- Palmer, Richmond: The Bornu Sahara and Sudan, London 1936 (a rough English translation of the Dīwān, pp. 89–95).
