= Muhammad I Kure =

Mai of the Kanem–Bornu Empire
- Reign: 14th century (1–2 years) c. 1328–1329 (Note: King lists (girgams) and chronicles translated in the 19th–20th centuries assign Muhammad a reign of 1 year (Barth, Palmer) or 2 years (Urvoy). He is omitted in the lists of Nachtigal and Landeroin. Due to this and to differing dates and calculations for other mais, various dates have been given for his reign, including 1352 (Barth), 1351–1352 (Palmer), and 1326–1328 (Urvoy). Cohen (1966) considered a reign of one year most likely. Lange (1984) dated Muhammad's reign to 1341–1342, Stewart (1989) dated it to 1352–1353, and Bosworth (2012) dated it to 1328–1329.)
- Predecessor: Kure II Kura
- Successor: Idris I Nikalemi
- Died: c. 1329 "Nánigham", "Nânigam Tagár'an", or "Galbewa"
- Dynasty: Sayfawa dynasty
- Father: Abdullah II Kademi
- Mother: Kagala

Muhammad I (Muḥammad bin ʿAbdallāh), also recorded as Kure and Kure Muhammad, was briefly mai (ruler) of the Kanem–Bornu Empire in the early 14th century, ruling approximately 1328–1329.

== Life ==
Muhammad was a son of mai Abdullah II Kademi. Muhammad's mother was named Kagala. He succeeded his brother Kure II Kura as mai in the early 14th century, after Kure died in battle against the Sao of Bornu. The Sao lived south of Lake Chad and had been greatly reduced, but not completely subjugated or wiped out, under earlier mais. The Sao rose up against the empire in the time of mai Selema III, another of Muhammad's brothers. Before Muhammad's reign, the conflict with the Sao had claimed the lives of three of his brothers; Selema, Kure I Gana, and Kure II.

After a short reign, Muhammad suffered the same fate, killed by the Sao at a site recorded as Nánigham, Nânigam Tagár'an, or Galbewa. With Muhammad's death the sons of Abdullah II were extinguished and the throne passed to Idris I Nikalemi, son of Abdullah II's cousin Ibrahim I Nikale.
