= Kure II Kura =

Mai of the Kanem–Bornu Empire
- Reign: 14th century (0–1 years) c. 1327–1328 (Note: King lists (girgams) and chronicles translated in the 19th–20th centuries assign Kure a reign of 8 months (Landeroin) or 1 year (Barth, Palmer, Urvoy, Nachtigal). Due to differing dates and calculations for other mais, various dates have been given for his reign, including 1351 (Barth), 1349–1350 (Palmer), 1325–1326 (Urvoy), 1285 (Landeroin), and 1348–1349 (Nachtigal). Landeroin and Nachtigal's lists reversed Kure I and Kure II's positions, so that Kure Kura was placed before Kure Gana. Cohen (1966) considered a reign of one year most likely. Lange (1984) dated Kure's reign to 1340–1341, Stewart (1989) dated it to 1351–1352, and Bosworth (2012) dated it to 1327–1328.)
- Predecessor: Kure I Gana
- Successor: Muhammad I Kure
- Died: c. 1328 "Ghaliwá"
- Dynasty: Sayfawa dynasty
- Father: Abdullah II Kademi

Kure II (Kure bin ʿAbdallāh), called Kure Kura (meaning "Kure the Elder") and Kure al-Kabir, was briefly mai (ruler) of the Kanem–Bornu Empire in the early 14th century, ruling approximately 1327–1328.

== Life ==
Kure II was a son of mai Abdullah II Kademi. He succeeded his younger brother Kure I Gana ("Kure the Younger") as mai in the early 14th century, after Kure I died in battle against the Sao of Bornu. The Sao lived south of Lake Chad and had been greatly reduced, but not completely subjugated or wiped out, under earlier mais. The Sao rose up against the empire in the time of mai Selema III, a brother of Kure I and Kure II who had also been killed by the Sao.

After a short reign, Kure was like his brothers also defeated and killed in battle by the Sao. He died at a site recorded as Ghaliwá (or variations thereof, such as N'geliwa), the same location where the Sao had killed Kure I. A contradictory tradition places his death at Kukawa, an error since that settlement was established in the 19th century. Kure II was succeeded as mai by another brother, Muhammad I Kure.
