= Abdullah II Kademi =

Mai of the Kanem–Bornu Empire
- Reign: 14th century (4–21 years) c. 1311–1322 (Note: King lists (girgams) and chronicles translated in the 19th–20th centuries assign Abdullah a reign of 4 years (Landeroin, Nachtigal), 19 years (Urvoy), 20 years (Barth), or 21 years (Palmer). Due to this and to differing dates and calculations for other mais, various dates have been given for his reign, including 1326–1345 (Barth), 1321–1342 (Palmer), 1301–1320 (Urvoy), 1281–1285 (Landeroin), and 1344–1348 (Nachtigal). Cohen (1966) considered a reign of 20 years most likely. Lange (1984) dated Abdullah's reign to 1315–1335 and Stewart (1989) dated it to 1326–1346. Bosworth (2012) assigned Abdullah eleven regnal years, dated to 1311–1322.)
- Predecessor: Ibrahim I Nikale
- Successor: Selema III
- Died: c. 1322; Njimi, Kanem
- Spouse: Kime; Kagala
- Issue: Selema III; Kure I Gana; Kure II Kura; Muhammad I Kure
- Dynasty: Sayfawa dynasty
- Father: Kade I Aujami
- Mother: Fatima

Abdullah II (ʿAbdallāh bin Kade), called Abdullah Kademi, was mai (ruler) of the Kanem–Bornu Empire in the early 14th century, ruling approximately 1311–1322.

== Life ==
Abdullah was a son of mai Kade I Aujami. His mother was named Fatima. Abdullah succeeded his cousin Ibrahim I Nikale as mai in the early 14th century, after Ibrahim was murdered by a group led by the yerima (a high official) Muhammad bin Ghadi.

Abdullah is remembered as a just ruler. He began his reign by avenging the murder of Ibrahim, sending word that the murderers should come to him to be ennobled. When the murderers arrived at court, Abdullah had them executed. Abdullah defeated a figure named Bagharimi or Bagharimma Gayu in a civil war. Bagharimi may have been some sort of rival in Ibrahim's reign. Abdullah is said to have "established his power with a strong hand".

There is considerable disagreement in the sources on the length of Abdullah's reign. He died of natural causes in Njimi and was succeeded as mai by his son Selema III. Selema and his three successors (Kure I Gana, Kure II Kura, and Muhammad I Kure), all sons of Abdullah, would reign in quick succession and all die fighting against the Sao. In later tradition, the deaths of Abdullah's sons were blamed on an incident when he had four thieves, all sons of the same mother, executed. The mother supposedly invoked God as witness to the thefts and prayed that the Abdullah's line would be ended.
