= Kade I Aujami =

Mai of the Kanem–Bornu Empire
- Reign: 13th century
- Predecessor: Dunama II Dibalemi
- Successor: Biri II Ibrahim (?)
- Died: Zamtam, Bornu, "Dhurríya Ghimútu", or "Lere N'gamutu"
- Spouse: Fatima
- Issue: Abdullah II Kademi
- Dynasty: Sayfawa dynasty
- Father: Dunama II Dibalemi
- Mother: Matala

Kade I (Kade bin Dunama), called Kade Aujami and also recorded as Abd al-Kadim, was mai (ruler) of the Kanem–Bornu Empire in the mid-to-late 13th century. A son of mai Dunama II Dibalemi, Kade ruled during a several decade-long period of succession conflict between the sons of Dunama. The precise sequence and chronology of mais is unclear in this period, which lasted from Dunama's death to the rise of Ibrahim I Nikale.

== Sources ==
Kade is recorded in lists of Kanem–Bornu rulers (girgams) translated by Heinrich Barth (1851), Gustav Nachtigal (1881), and Moïse Landeroin [fr] (1911), as well as in the work of Richmond Palmer (1936) and Yves Urvoy (1941). Kade's mother was named Matala and hailed from the "tribe of the Meghárma". The nickname Aujami means "son of Auja" which could indicate that Kade was raised by a sister of his father; the sister of a man's father is often referred to as his Arja or Auja.

Al-Maqrizi recorded that Kade conducted military campaigns in the Lake Chad region. According to the girgam, Kade was murdered by a man called ʽAndákama Dunama or N'dikuma Dunama. The site of his murder is variously identified as Zamtam in Bornu (where his father also died), Dhurríya Ghimútu, or Lere N'gamutu.

Kade I across sources
Author	Reign	Predecessor	Successor	Ref
Barth (1851)	29 years (1259–1285)	Dunama II Dibalemi	Biri II Ibrahim	
Nachtigal (1881)	7 years (1337–1344)	Dirke Kelem	Abdullah II Kademi (Note: The lists of Nachtigal and Landeroin ordered mais differently from other sources in several places based on their familial relationships. Abdullah II Kademi is placed earlier in their lists than in those of other authors.)	
Landeroin (1911)	7 years (1274–1281)	Dirke Kelem	Abdullah II Kademi	
Palmer (1936)	19 years (1259–1278)	Dunama II Dibalemi	Biri II Ibrahim	
Urvoy (1941)	18 years (1224–1242)	Dunama II Dibalemi	Biri II Ibrahim	
Lange (1984)	29 years (1248–1277)	Dunama II Dibalemi	Biri II Ibrahim	
Stewart (1989)	1 year (1259–1260)	Dunama II Dibalemi	Biri II Ibrahim	
Bosworth (2012)	?	Dunama II Dibalemi	Biri II Ibrahim	
