= Jalil of Kanem =

Jalil

Mai of the Kanem–Bornu Empire
- Reign: 13th century
- Predecessor: Biri II Ibrahim (?)
- Successor: Dirke Kelem (?)
- Dynasty: Sayfawa dynasty
- Father: Dunama II Dibalemi

Jalil (Note: The name is also spelled Djilil and Jil.) (Jalīl bin Dunama), possibly also recorded as Biri, was mai (ruler) of the Kanem–Bornu Empire in the mid-to-late 13th century. A son of mai Dunama II Dibalemi, Jalil ruled during a several decade-long period of succession conflict between the sons of Dunama. The precise sequence and chronology of mais is unclear in this period, which lasted from Dunama's death to the rise of Ibrahim I Nikale.

== Sources ==
Jalil is recorded in a list of Kanem–Bornu rulers (girgam) translated by Moïse Landeroin (1911) and in the work of Yves Urvoy (1941). He is omitted in lists translated by Heinrich Barth (1851), Gustav Nachtigal (1881), and Richmond Palmer (1936). Nachtigal records a possibly equivalent mai but names him Biri bin Dunama instead; this Biri is not the same figure as Biri II Ibrahim, listed separately, and is omitted in all other sources. Cohen (1966) proposed that Biri was the ruler's Kanuri name and Jalil was his Arabic name.

Jalil across sources
Author	Reign	Predecessor	Successor	Ref
Barth (1851)	Omitted	—	—	
Nachtigal (1881)	1 year (1308–1309) (Biri)	Dunama II Dibalemi	Dirke Kelem	
Landeroin (1911)	1 year (1254–1255)	Dunama II Dibalemi	Dirke Kelem	
Palmer (1936)	Omitted	—	—	
Urvoy (1941)	1 year (1262)	Biri II Ibrahim	Dirke Kelem	
Lange (1984)	Omitted	—	—	
Stewart (1989)	Omitted	—	—	
Bosworth (2012)	?	Biri II Ibrahim	Dirke Kelem	
