= Biri II Ibrahim =

Mai of the Kanem–Bornu Empire
- Reign: 13th century
- Predecessor: Kade I Aujami (?)
- Successor: Jalil (?)
- Died: Njimi, Kanem
- Spouse: Kagudi
- Issue: Ibrahim I Nikale
- Dynasty: Sayfawa dynasty
- Father: Dunama II Dibalemi
- Mother: Zainab

Biri Ibrahim (Biri Ibrāhīm bin Dunama), enumerated as Biri II, and also recorded as Kashim Biri and Uthman, was mai (ruler) of the Kanem–Bornu Empire in the mid-to-late 13th century. A son of mai Dunama II Dibalemi, Biri Ibrahim ruled during a several decade-long period of succession conflict between the sons of Dunama. The precise sequence and chronology of mais is unclear in this period, which lasted from Dunama's death to the rise of Ibrahim I Nikale.

== Sources ==
Biri Ibrahim is recorded in lists of Kanem–Bornu rulers (girgams) translated by Heinrich Barth (1851), Gustav Nachtigal (1881), and Moïse Landeroin (1911). Richmond Palmer (1936) and Yves Urvoy (1941) used the name Kashim Biri instead. Stewart (1989) erroneously listed Biri Ibrahim and Kashim Biri as two separate mais, whereas Lange (1984) and Bosworth (2012) like previous authors considered them the same figure.

According to Barth's girgam, Biri Ibrahim was remembered as a conqueror, though it was not recorded what conquests he made. He reportedly died at Njimi, the capital of the empire. Biri's mother was named Zainab and hailed from the "tribe of the Lekmamma". The earliest reference to the Fulani in the territory of the Kanem–Bornu Empire dates to Biri's reign, when they arrived as envoys of the Mali Empire.

Biri II Ibrahim across sources
| Author | Reign | Predecessor | Successor | Ref |
|---|---|---|---|---|
| Barth (1851) | 20 years (1288–1306) | Kade I Aujami | Ibrahim I Nikale | |
| Nachtigal (1881) | 16 years (1351–1367) | Selema III (Note: The lists of Nachtigal and Landeroin ordered mais differently from other sources in several places based on their familial relationships. Selema III is placed earlier in their lists than in those of other authors.) | Ibrahim I Nikale | |
| Landeroin (1911) | 17 years (1287–1304) | Selema III | Ibrahim I Nikale | |
| Palmer (1936) | 21 years (1279–1300) | Kade I Aujami | Ibrahim I Nikale | |
| Urvoy (1941) | 20 years (1242–1262) | Kade I Aujami | Jalil | |
| Lange (1984) | 19 years (1277–1296) | Kade I Aujami | Ibrahim I Nikale | |
| Stewart (1989) | 28 years (1260–1288, Kashim Biri) | Kade I Aujami | Biri II Ibrahim | |
| Stewart (1989) | 19 years (1288–1307, Biri II) | Kashim Biri | Ibrahim I Nikale | |
| Bosworth (2012) | ? | Kade I Aujami | Jalil | |
