= Atuma (sultan) =

- Sarkin Kano
- Reign: 1452
- Predecessor: Dakauta
- Successor: Yakubu
- House: Bagauda Dynasty
- Father: Dakauta

Atuma was a Sultan of Kano who reigned for only 7 days in 1452.

== Biography in the Kano Chronicle ==
Below is a biography of Atuma from Palmer's 1908 English translation of the Kano Chronicle.

The 18th Sarki was Atuma, son of Dakauta. He was king for 7 days only.

He was turned out of the office of Sarki, for fear of trouble with the Galadima Dauda.

— Kano Chronicle

Preceded by Dakauta	Sarkin Kano; 1452	Succeeded by Yakubu
