= Dunama II Dibalemi =

Mai of the Kanem–Bornu Empire
- Reign: 13th century (14–44 years) c. 1221–1259 (Note: King lists (girgams) and chronicles translated in the 19th–20th centuries assign Dunama a reign of 14 years (Urvoy), 38 years (Palmer), 40 years (Barth), 42 years (Nachtigal), or 44 years (Landeroin). Due to this and to differing dates and calculations for other mais, various dates have been given for his reign, including 1221–1259 (Barth, Palmer), 1210–1224 (Urvoy), 1210–1254 (Landeroin), and 1266–1308 (Nachtigal). Cohen considered a reign of 40 years most likely. Lange (1984) dated Dunama's reign to 1210–1248. Both Stewart (1989) and Bosworth (2012) used Barth and Palmer's dates, 1221–1259.)
- Predecessor: Selema II
- Successor: Kade I Aujami
- Died: c. 1259; Zamtam, Bornu
- Spouse: Matala; Zainab
- Issue: Kade I Aujami; Biri II Ibrahim; Jalil; Dirke Kelem
- Dynasty: Sayfawa dynasty
- Father: Selema II
- Mother: Dibala

Dunama II (Dunama (Note: Dunama is sometimes recorded with additional names, such as Muhammad and Ahmed.) bin ʿAbd al-Jalīl), called Dunama Dibalemi (Note: "Dunama, son of Dibala". The spelling Dibalemi is the most common. Other spellings sometimes used include Dabbalemi, Dibbalemi, Dibbelemi, Dibalami, and Dabalemi.) and Dunama Selmami, (Note: "Dunama, son of Selema".) was mai (ruler) of the Kanem–Bornu Empire in the early-to-mid 13th century, ruling approximately 1221–1259. Dunama is remembered as one of the most energetic and influential rulers of the empire.

Dunama was an accomplished warrior-king who oversaw several important military innovations, possibly including the introduction of both cavalry warfare and mail armor. His reign was marked by successful efforts of military and economic expansion, an increasingly feudal political system, increased diplomatic ties with North Africa and Egypt, and further Islamization of the empire. Dunama brought Kanem to the peak of its power, leaving the empire as the most powerful state in Central Africa by the time of his death.

== Life ==
Dunama was a son of mai Selema II (who is also called Abd al-Jalil). His mother was named Dibala and hailed from the "tribe of the Maghárma". In addition to being recorded in later Kanem–Bornu oral history and documents, sparse details of Dunama's reign were also recorded by the contemporary Arab geographer Ibn Sa'id al-Maghribi (1213–1286). Dunama succeeded his father as mai in the early 13th century and had a long and energetic reign.

=== Military innovations and wars ===
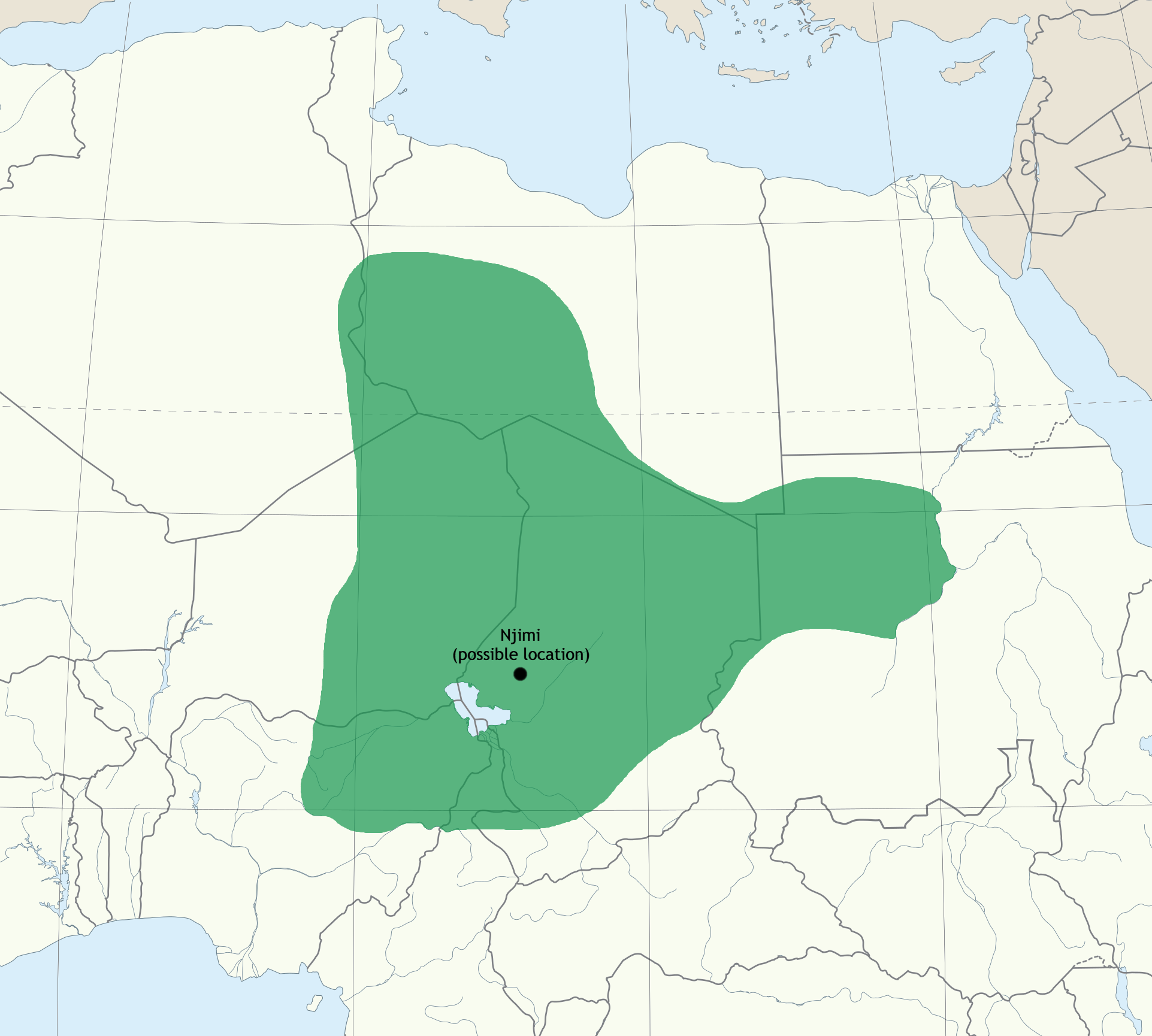
Waziri (2023)

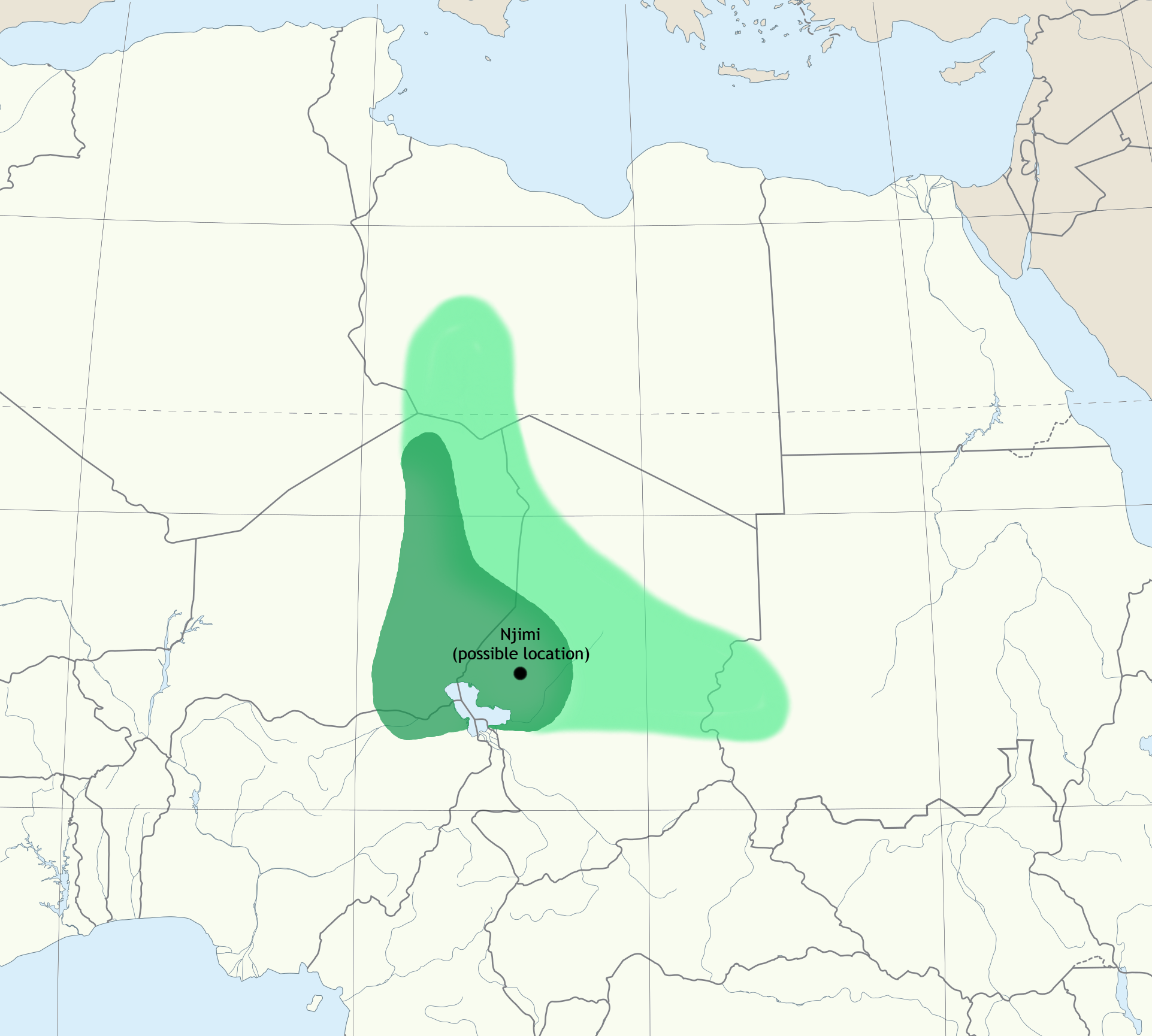
Magnavita et al. (2019)

Two different versions of the extent of the Kanem–Bornu Empire in the 13th century, by different researchers

Dunama oversaw several important military innovations. He spent his early reign building up a large cavalry force and was the earliest ruler of Kanem to have made substantial use of cavalry. Dunama has been credited with introducing cavalry to Central Africa. The Mali Empire in the west would not adopt cavalry until the 1330s, about a century after Dunama. Having diplomatic contact with Egypt, Dunama may have been inspired by the Mamluk cavalry used there. Import of mail armor in the central Sudan region may also have begun under Dunama. There are no surviving contemporary descriptions of Dunama's army. A 15th-century account describes his army as numbering 100,000 men, including cavalry, infantry, and porters, though this number might be an exaggeration. Dunama's cavalry force numbered between 30,000 and 40,000 strong.

A girgam (king list) translated by Richmond Palmer in 1912 records Dunama as "a warrior hotter than fire". Wars against Dunama's non-Islamic neighbors were justified in the name of jihad. Dunama extended the empire to control the entire Fezzan region in modern-day northwestern Chad and Libya; the empire would maintain its grip on these lands until the middle of the 14th century. He is recorded to have fought a long war against the Toubou people, said in later tradition to have lasted for 7 years, 7 months, and 7 days. In addition to his cavalry force, Dunama commanded a sizable fleet stationed on the northern shores of Lake Chad. This fleet was according to Ibn Sa'id al-Maghribi used for sea raids "on the lands of the pagans, on the shores of this lake ... [he] attacks their ships and kills and takes prisoners". In his southern and western wars against the Sao, Dunama reached as far south as Mafoni in modern day Borno State, Nigeria. Several of Dunama's campaigns were led by his sons, who consequently formed themselves into different parties and factions.

Dunama's campaigns against non-Muslims in the south extended his reach across the entire Chad Basin and secured control of the southern parts of the major trans-Saharan trade routes, while his northern campaigns guaranteed control of the northern parts. The region of Bornu was firmly under imperial control, and Dunama's authority extended as far west as Kano, as far east as the Ouaddaï highlands, and as far south as the Adamawa Plateau.

Some accounts place the limits of Dunama's authority further, as far east as the Nile and as far west as the Niger River. Contemporary documentary evidence supports the empire exerting influence in the Darfur region (modern-day Sudan) in the 13th century but the extent of control is unclear. There is little concrete evidence of direct contact between the Chad Basin and the Nile Valley prior to the 15th century. It has been suggested that trade and political relations between the Central Sudan and the Nile Valley was hampered or even blocked by the Christian kingdoms in Nubia, particularly Makuria, until the 13th century. Archaeology has likewise not demonstrated any concrete links between the two regions. According to Magnavita et al. (2019), the lack of evidence may simply reflect the paucity of research, especially since key areas in Chad and Sudan remain poorly excavated.

=== Religious and administrative policies ===
Dunama was a fervent Muslim, so much so that the later Egyptian historian al-Maqrizi incorrectly identified him as the first Muslim of his dynasty. Dunama went on the Hajj to Mecca twice and gave alms to the poor. According to Ibn Sa'id al-Maghribi, Dunama was known for "his religious warfare and charitable acts". Dunama took more direct action than his predecessors in attempting to convert the people of the empire, ordering them to abandon their traditional practices and follow the ways of Islam.

Perhaps as part of this process, later accounts state that Dunama "opened" the mune. It is not clear what the mune was as no precise description survives, nor what is meant by "opening" it. Most literary sources (16th–19th century) suggest that the mune was similar to the Ark of the Covenant, being some sort of covered container that held commandments which defined the relationship between the mai and God. Dunama II Dabbalemi opening the mune was widely perceived as a negative act and as something that contributed to the empire's troubles in following centuries. The mune has also been suggested to have been the focal point of a pre-Islamic cult; The German scholar Dierk Lange has stated that it could have been a statue of Amun obtained from Meroë centuries prior, which Dunama unwrapped from some veiling. When the mune was broken, "its content was set free and flew away".

At some point after the conversion to Islam, perhaps in Dunama's reign, Kanem adopted an increasingly feudal political system. Around this time there appeared a class of princes (maina), and a large system of titles was developed, including styles such as arjinoma, yerima, and tegoma. Court titles such as musterema (chief eunuch) and ciroma (heir to the throne) also began to appear.

=== Diplomacy and trade ===
Dunama had good relations with Ayyubid Egypt and arranged for the establishment of a special hostel in Cairo to assists pilgrims who traveled from Kanem to Mecca and students from Kanem who were in Egypt for scholarly pursuits. The hostel, called Médreset E'bn Rashik, was built by people Dunama sent from Kanem.

Dunama initiated diplomatic exchanges with the Muslim rulers of North Africa. The later Arab historian Ibn Khaldun (1332–1406) for instance records an embassy sent by Dunama, who he calls "King of Kanem and Lord of Bornu", to Tunisia in 1257. As part of the embassy, Dunama sent a giraffe as a gift to Sultan Muhammad I al-Mustansir of the Hafsid dynasty. Through his wars, Dunama captured many non-Muslim slaves, especially in the lands south of Lake Chad. These territories were a profitable hunting ground for non-Muslims, who did not fall under Islamic prohibition against slavery. Slaves captured by Dunama were sold to North African traders through the trans-Saharan trade, in exchange for horses and other goods that were in short supply in Central Africa.

=== Succession ===
By the end of Dunama's reign, Kanem had been brought to the peak of its power and Dunama ruled the strongest kingdom in Central Africa. Although the empire was intact and heavily armed, undercurrents of unrest and rebellion had begun to appear late in Dunama's reign, both in the form of an increasing alienation of the traditionalist Bilala people and due to Dunama's sons having transitioned into effective governors of the empire's outer territories.

Dunama was forced to deal with the growing independence of his sons, who the girgam remarks had become "separated into different regions". One girgam, translated by Richmond Palmer in 1926, states that there was a civil war in Dunama's time that "occurred through the greed of his children".

Dunama died at Zamtam in Bornu. He was succeeded as mai by his son Kade I Aujami but a decades-long succession conflict soon broke out between Dunama's sons.
