= Dirke Kelem =

Mai of the Kanem–Bornu Empire
- Reign: 13th century
- Predecessor: Jalil (?)
- Successor: Ibrahim I Nikale
- Dynasty: Sayfawa dynasty
- Father: Dunama II Dibalemi

Dirke Kelem (Note: The name is sometimes spelled as Dirko Kelem. Landeroin (1911) recorded him as Derin Kaloumi.) (Dirke Kelem bin Dunama) was mai (ruler) of the Kanem–Bornu Empire in the mid-to-late 13th century. A son of mai Dunama II Dibalemi, Dirke Kelem ruled during a several decade-long period of succession conflict between the sons of Dunama. The precise sequence and chronology of mais is unclear in this period, which lasted from Dunama's death to the rise of Ibrahim I Nikale.

== Sources ==
Dirke Kelem is recorded in lists of Kanem–Bornu rulers (girgams) translated by Gustav Nachtigal (1881), Moïse Landeroin (1911), and in the work of Yves Urvoy (1941). He is omitted in lists translated by Heinrich Barth (1851) and Richmond Palmer (1936). Among later authors, Dirke Kelem is omitted by Lange (1984) and Stewart (1989), but included by Bosworth (2012).

Dirke Kelem across sources
Author	Reign	Predecessor	Successor	Ref
Barth (1851)	Omitted	—	—	
Nachtigal (1881)	28 years (1309–1337)	Jalil	Kade I Aujami	
Landeroin (1911)	19 years (1255–1274)	Jalil	Kade I Aujami	
Palmer (1936)	Omitted	—	—	
Urvoy (1941)	19 years (1262–1281)	Jalil	Ibrahim I Nikale	
Lange (1984)	Omitted	—	—	
Stewart (1989)	Omitted	—	—	
Bosworth (2012)	?	Jalil	Ibrahim I Nikale	
