= Shekarau =

Shekarau or Shekkarau may refer to the following people.

- Shekarau I, a Hausa king (reign: 1290-1307)
- Shekarau II, a Hausa king (reign: 1649-1651)
- Ibrahim Shekarau, former Nigerian minister of education and Governor of Kano State
