= Yakubu (sultan) =

- Sarkin Kano
- Reign: 1432-1463
- Predecessor: Atuma
- Successor: Muhammad Rimfa
- House: Bagauda Dynasty
- Father: Abdullahi Burja
- Mother: Tasafi

Yakubu was a Sultan of Kano who reigned from 1432 to 1463.

== Biography in the Kano Chronicle ==
Below is a biography of Yakubu from Palmer's 1908 English translation of the Kano Chronicle.

The 19th Sarki was Yakubu, son of Tasafi. He was a good Sarki.

In his time Agalfati came to Kano; he was Sarkin Gaia, and son of Sarkin Machina. Gaia came with his three brothers who became Sarkin Hadeijia, Sarkin Dal and Sarkin Gaiam. The Sarkin Hadeijia became Sarkin Gabbas, and was given Hadeijia. The Sarkin Gaia came to Kano and was given Gaia. The Sarkin Dal came to Kano and was given Dal. Sarkin Gaiam went to Zaria and was given Gaiam.

In Yakubu’s time the Fulani came to Hausaland from Mele, bringing with them books on Divinity and Etymology. Formerly our doctors had, in addition to the Koran, only the books of the Law and the Traditions. The Fulani passed by and went to Bornu leaving a few men in Hausaland, together with some slaves and people who were tired of journeying.

At this time too the Asbenawa came to Gobir, and salt became common in Hausaland. In the following year merchants from Gwanja began coming to Katsina; Beriberi came in large numbers, and a colony of Arabs arrived. Some of the Arabs settled in Kano and some in Katsina.

There was no war in Hausaland in Yakubu’s time. He sent 10 horses to the Sarkin Nupe in order to buy eunuchs. The Sarkin Nupe gave him 12 eunuchs.

Yakubu ruled Kano 11 years.

— Kano Chronicle

Preceded by Atuma	Sarkin Kano; 1452-1463	Succeeded by Muhammad Rimfa
