= Dakauta =

- Sarkin Kano
- Reign: 1452
- Predecessor: Abdullahi Burja
- Successor: Atuma
- House: Bagauda Dynasty
- Father: Abdullahi Burja

Dakauta was a Sultan of Kano who reigned for only one day in 1452.

== Biography in the Kano Chronicle ==
Below is a biography of Dakauta from Palmer's 1908 English translation of the Kano Chronicle.

The 17th Sarki was Dakauta. He was dumb. The people said, “If he becomes Sarki he will be able to speak.”

When he had been made Sarki, and after one night did not speak, they turned him out again.

— Kano Chronicle

Preceded by Abdullahi Burja	Sarkin Kano; 1452	Succeeded by Atuma
