= Kure I Gana =

Mai of the Kanem–Bornu Empire
- Reign: 14th century (0–2 years) c. 1326–1327 (Note: King lists (girgams) and chronicles translated in the 19th–20th centuries assign Kure a reign of 0 years (Nachtigal), 7 months (Landeroin), 1 year (Barth, Palmer), or 2 years (Urvoy). Due to this and to differing dates and calculations for other mais, various dates have been given for his reign, including 1350 (Barth), 1348–1349 (Palmer), 1323–1325 (Urvoy), 1286 (Landeroin), and 1349 (Nachtigal). Landeroin and Nachtigal's lists reversed Kure I and Kure II's positions, so that Kure Kura was placed before Kure Gana. Cohen (1966) considered a reign of one year most likely. Lange (1984) dated Kure's reign to 1339–1340, Stewart (1989) dated it to 1350–1351, and Bosworth (2012) dated it to 1326–1327.)
- Predecessor: Selema III
- Successor: Kure II Kura
- Died: c. 1327 "Ghaliwá"
- Dynasty: Sayfawa dynasty
- Father: Abdullah II Kademi

Kure I (Kure bin ʿAbdallāh), called Kure Gana (Note: Also spelled Kure Ghana.) (meaning "Kure the Younger") and Kure al-Saghir, was briefly mai (ruler) of the Kanem–Bornu Empire in the early 14th century, ruling approximately 1326–1327.

== Life ==
Kure was a son of mai Abdullah II Kademi. He succeeded his brother Selema III as mai in the early 14th century, after Selema died in battle against the Sao of Bornu. The Sao lived south of Lake Chad and had been greatly reduced, but not completely subjugated or wiped out, under earlier mais. The Sao rose up against the empire in Selema's time. Despite being younger, Kure appears to have become mai over his elder brother Kure Kura ("Kura the Elder").

After a short reign, Kure was also defeated and killed in battle by the Sao, dying at a site recorded as Ghaliwá (or variations thereof, such as N'geliwa). A contradictory tradition places his death in Hausaland. Kure Gana was succeeded as mai by his elder brother Kure Kura.
