= Abdullahi Burja =

Ruler of Kano (r. 1438–1452)

Sarkin Kano
- Reign: 1438 – 1452
- Predecessor: Dauda Bakon Damisa
- Successor: Dakauta
- Born: Abdullahi Dan Kanajeji
- Dynasty: Bagauda
- Father: Kanajeji
- Religion: Islam

'Abdullahi Dan Kanajeji , known as Abdullahi Burja, was the sixteenth ruler of Kano. Through forging of powerful alliances and the creation of trade routes, Burja shifted the identity of the Kano Sultanate towards trade and commerce, what Kano and its people are known for today. He was the first Hausa King to pay tribute to Bornu which secured an agreement to open trade routes from Gwanja to Bornu. He was also the first King to own camels in Hausaland. By the end of the 15th Century, Kano emerged as one of the most vibrant trading centers in the Sahel. Through trade, the Hausa language and culture was spread throughout the region.

== Ascension and Reign ==
Abdullahi Burja's mother's name was Tekidda. He was the third successive son of King Kanajeji to be made ruler of Kano. According to the Kano Chronicle, his reign coincided with the late days of the infamous Queen Amina of Zazzau. It was said that the Sultan waged war on Dutse and later took a daughter of their leader as his wife, the first mention of Dutse in recorded history. Burja established trade relations with Bornu and created trade routes from Gwanja to Bornu. This shift towards trade saw an intensification of slave raids by Kano towards the south to export to Bornu. Abdullahi Burja through his Galadima created twenty one new slave colonies. Slowly, trade in Kano shifted towards other commodities During this time, all the young men of Kano were enjoined to military service and only old men remained in Kano. Abdullahi was noted by the Kano Chronicle for his generosity.

=== Exploits of the Galadima ===
Burja was implored to return home after his campaign in Dutse by the Galadima, Dauda, vowing to do whatever the King wishes. Galadima Dauda engaged in a slave raiding expedition in the regions south of Kano which produced a thousand slaves monthly for seven years before being asked to return home by the King. On his way back to Kano, the Galadima would build a new city every three miles with five hundred male and five hundred female slaves. When he reached Kano, he gave the Sultan three thousand slaves and informed him of his exploits. All in all, Galadima Dauda built twenty one new towns which he called "Ibdabu" and was made Lord of these towns by the Sultan.

=== Dagachi ===
In the reign of his predecessor, his brother, Dauda Bakon Damisa, a great Bornu prince which the Girgam corroborates as Othman Kalnama sought refuge in Kano and took the title Dagachi. From that point, the figure is referred to as Dagachi so it is possible that this title was passed on to descendants of Othman. It is said that the Dagachi began to amass great wealth and power during Dauda's reign and this continued in the reign of Abdullahi Burja. When Abdullahi returned from his expedition in Dutse, he found that Dagachi had established a market in Karabka and built countless houses. Dagachi would eventually revolt unsuccessfully in the time of Abdullahi Dan Rumfa with his kin in Bornu coming to his aid.

=== Family and Marriages ===
Abdullahi Burja was the first sarki to marry the daughters of the Galadima, Sarkin Rano, Sarkin Dutse, and Sarkin Shirra. He is the father of Sultan Yakubu, who was the father of Muhammad Rumfa.

=== Death and succession ===
The death of Abdullahi Burja in 1452 saw a short period of instability that produced three Kings within eight days. His first successor, his son Dakauta, was dumb and the people theorized that becoming King would make him speak. He was turned out a day later when his speech wasn't restored. Dakauta's son then ascended the throne but abdicated 7 days later in fear of Galadima Dauda, allowing Abdullahi Burja's son Yakubu to assume the throne of Kano.

== Biography in the Kano Chronicle ==
Below is a full biography of Abdullahi Burja from Palmer's 1908 English translation of the Kano Chronicle.

The 16th Sarki was Abdulahi Burja. His mother’s name was Tekidda.

There was no one like him for generosity. He was the first in Hausaland to give Bornu “tsare or gaisua.” He opened roads from Bornu to Gwanja. He was the first to own camels in Hausaland.

Sarkin Bornu left his country at this time and went to attack Asben, but as he could not find any water for his army he returned home. The next year every town in the west paid him “tsare.” The Sarkin Kano went out to Khud and encamped there one year and six months. The Galadima Daudu went to wage war in the south. In Burja’s time Karmashi conquered the Migawa. The Sarki went to Dussi. The Galadima Daudu said to him, “Return to Kano, I will do for you whatever you want done, and defeat your enemies.”

So the Sarkin Kano returned home. When he arrived in Kano, he found that Dagachi had assumed great power in the town, and collected wealth without end, and had built houses from his house as far as Salamta. It was Dagachi who made the market of Karabka. All this time the Galadima Daudu was in the south making war on the pagans every day, conquering them and taking them as slaves. Every month he sent 1,000 slaves to Sarkin Kano. All the people of Kano flocked to him. There was no one left in Kano except the Sarki and very old men. Every day the Sarki sent to the Galadima horses, clothes and horse trapping.

The Galadima was sung as follows:

Gatherer of the axes of the south
Gatherer of the youth of the south
Drum of Wealth, Galadima
Drum of Land, Galadima

He stayed 7 years in the south. Slaves became very numerous in Kano. The Sarki sent to him to tell him to come back, so he returned. When he was returning, he stopped every 3 miles, and built a town. He left at each 1,000 slaves, 500 males, and 500 females. He thus founded 21 towns, before he came to Kano. On arriving there he gave the Sarki 3,000 slaves and said to him, “I have founded 21 towns, and in each I have left 1,000 slaves, all yours.”

The Sarki asked him, “What are the names of the towns you have built?”

The Galadima said, “Their names are Ibdabu.”

The Sarki said, “I make you ruler of all these towns and their domains.”

Because of this the Galadima was called “Daudu, the strength of the city.”

The next year the Sarki sent to Dussi to ask for a wife. He was the first Sarki who married a daughter of Sarkin Dussi, Sarkin Shirra and Sarkin Eano, and also a daughter of the Galadima.

He ruled 15 years.

— Kano Chronicle

Preceded by Dauda	Sarkin Kano; 1438-1452	Succeeded by Dakauta
