= Shekkarau II =

- Sarkin Kano
- Reign: 1649-1651
- Predecessor: Alhaji
- Successor: Muhammad Kukuna
- House: Bagauda Dynasty
- Father: Alhaji
- Mother: Fari

Shekkarau II was a Sultan of Kano who reigned from 1649 to 1651.

== Biography in the Kano Chronicle ==
Below is a biography of Shekkarau II from Palmer's 1908 English translation of the Kano Chronicle.

The 31st Sarki was Shekkarau, the son of Alhaji and Fari.

In his time peace was made between Kano and Katsina. The peacemakers were Shehu Ataman, Mallam Bawa and Liman Yandoiya. Shehu Ataman said: “In future, whoever is the aggressor between you shall never prevail, if Allah wills, till the day of Judgment.” About this time Dan Tamma Maji went out with Sarkin Gesu Sulimanu to Godia.

Shekkaro ruled 1 year and 7 months and 24 days.

— Kano Chronicle

Preceded by Alhaji	Sarkin Kano; 1649-1651	Succeeded by Muhammad Kukuna
