= Ibrahim I Nikale =

Mai of the Kanem–Bornu Empire
- Reign: 13th/14th century (1–21 years) c. 1290–1311 (Note: King lists (girgams) and chronicles translated in the 19th–20th centuries assign Ibrahim a reign of 1 year (Nachtigal), 20 years (Barth, Urvoy, Landeroin), or 21 years (Palmer). Due to this and to differing dates and calculations for other mais, various dates have been given for his reign, including 1307–1326 (Barth), 1300–1321 (Palmer), 1281–1301 (Urvoy), 1304–1324 (Landeroin), and 1367–1368 (Nachtigal). Cohen (1966) considered a reign of 20 years most likely. Lange (1984) dated Ibrahim's reign to 1296–1315, Stewart (1989) dated it to 1307–1326, and Bosworth (2012) dated it to 1290–1311.)
- Predecessor: Dirke Kelem
- Successor: Abdullah II Kademi
- Died: c. 1311 "Dískama"
- Spouse: Hafsa; Fatima
- Issue: Idris I Nikalemi; Dawud Nikalemi
- Dynasty: Sayfawa dynasty
- Father: Biri II Ibrahim
- Mother: Kagudi

al-Ḥājj Ibrahim Nikale (Ibrāhīm Nikale bin Biri), enumerated as Ibrahim I, (Note: Ibrahim Nikale has also historically and rarely also been enumerated as Ibrahim II, counting the empire's legendary second ruler Biram as Ibrahim I. Later rulers named Ibrahim have their regnal numbers increased in this case. Modern sources enumerate Ibrahim Nikale as Ibrahim I.) was mai (ruler) of the Kanem–Bornu Empire in the late 13th and/or early 14th century, ruling approximately 1290–1311.

== Life ==
Ibrahim Nikale was a son of mai Biri II Ibrahim. His mother was named Kagudi and came from the tribe of the "Kúnkuna". A grandson of mai Dunama II Dibalemi, Ibrahim succeeded his uncle Dirke Kelem as mai in the late 13th century. Ibrahim's father and uncles had been engaged in a succession conflict prior to his rise to the throne and reigned in quick succession.

Ibrahim was faced with succession conflicts of his own. At some point in his reign, Ibrahim had one of his sons killed, probably because this son had revolted against him. Ibrahim at some point made a pilgrimage to Mecca, and is therefore given the honorific al-Ḥājj in some sources.

After a reign of about twenty years, Ibrahim was murdered by the yerima (a high official) Muhammad bin Ghadi at a site recorded as Dískama. Muhammad had Ibrahim's body thrown in the Wau River and power in the empire passed to Ibrahim's cousin Abdullah II Kademi.
