= Archaeology of Zilum =

Zilum
- Site Location in Nigeria
- 12°25′46″N 13°21′14″E
- Type: Archaeological
- Location: Borno State, Nigeria
- Region: Northeastern Nigeria

Site notes
- Excavation dates: 1997, 2000, 2001, 2002, 2003 & 2006
- Archaeologists: Carlos Magnavita, Peter Breunig
- Condition: Excavated
- Owner: Nigerian Government

Zilum is a settlement of the Gajiganna culture located in the Chad Basin of northeastern Nigeria, 72 km north of Maiduguri in Borno State and is dated to ca 600-400 BCE. The site itself is relatively flat, sits on a large sand ridge, and is bordered to the south by a clay depression. Zilum was discovered in 1997 by Peter Breunig and from 2000-2002, Carlos Magnavita began several test excavations at the site.

Zilum covers a settlement area of approximately 12 hectares and emerged from the Final Stone Age food-producing communities of the Gajiganna culture. The majority of the inhabitants of Zilum would have been occupied by the cultivation of crops and perhaps animal husbandry, while select groups of artisans would have contributed to the production of goods such as pottery, leather goods, and possibly beads and/or bone points. Zilum belongs to Gajiganna Phase III sites, which are thought to be younger and exhibit more sedentary communities. While ceramic analysis makes correlations between Zilum's pottery assemblages and those of the Final Stone Age Gajiganna, radiocarbon measurements on organic samples from the site date Zilum to between the 7th and 5th centuries BCE, notably a transitional period between the Late Stone Age and Early Iron Age in West Africa. Despite this transitional occupation period, Zilum does not show direct evidence for iron or iron working.

As Carlos Magnavita became an advocate for magnetic survey and the application of geophysical methods to archaeological work in sub-Saharan Africa, magnetometry, the analysis of micro-botanical evidence, and ceramic analysis form the basis of archaeological conclusions and interpretations currently drawn from this site.

== Magnetic Survey ==
=== Geophysical methods in sub-Saharan Africa ===
Prior to the early 2000s, geophysical methods for mapping subsurface structures and archaeological features were virtually non-existent in the archaeological work of sub-Saharan Africa. Tite (1966) and Fagg (1969) were the first to attempt to use magnetometry in sub-Saharan Africa as they studied Taruga, a Nok Culture site in Nigeria. Although the findings from this early use of magnetometry were less precise than they would be today, their work demonstrated the importance and efficacy of magnetometry in a sub-Saharan context. Carlos Magnavita furthers this work by employing magnetic survey at Zilum in northeastern Nigeria, demonstrating how geophysical methods are advantageous, despite additional costs, for archaeological work south of the Sahara as they provide data not accessible via traditional survey and excavation methods. The significance of geophysical methods in sub-Saharan archaeological work is illustrated by Magnavita as

The evidence revealed by the magnetic survey in Zilum is significant for field research on sub-Saharan African archaeological sites, as it shows that only the use of traditional investigation methods can passively handicap the understanding of the nature of past settlements.

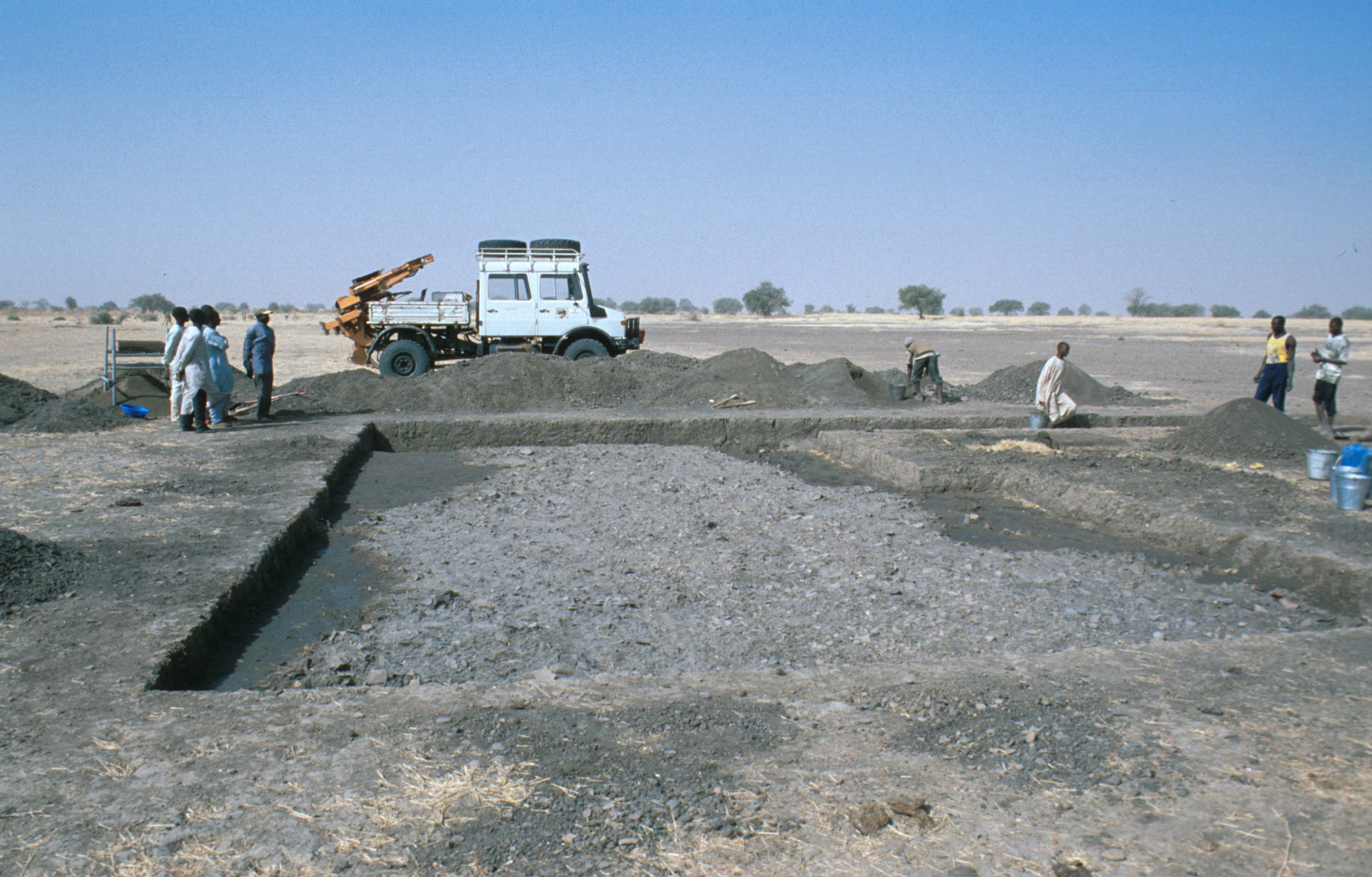
Cutting overview ditch

=== Magnetometry ===
Magnavita's magnetic survey was carried out in the eastern and southern parts of the site using a Fluxgate-Magnetometer FEREX 4.032. The significant distribution of pits at this site were discovered by magnetometry due to the potsherds discarded and/or used in these pits. Some pits were visible or identifiable from the surface due to the abundance of cultural material at the surface (oftentimes broken pottery), but magnetometry allowed for the exact mapping of these pits. This is because fired clay materials generate a magnetic disturbance that contrasts with the surrounding ground material, essentially illuminating the shape of man-made features. Many of these pits were dug for the extraction of clay for craft production, but they were then used for borrowing, refuse, and storage.

The presence of a ditch-and-rampart system suggests that Gajiganna Phase III was less peaceful than the previous phases as the earlier settlements do not show evidence of fortification. The presence of numerous storage pits indicates the recurrence of and reliance on food security, as well as supports the construction of buildings/structures created from the material dug out of these pits, like huts and rampart walls. Interpretations of culture and lifestyle would not have been possible without the use of magnetometry as the largest number of pits, trenches, and ditches would have remained undetected.

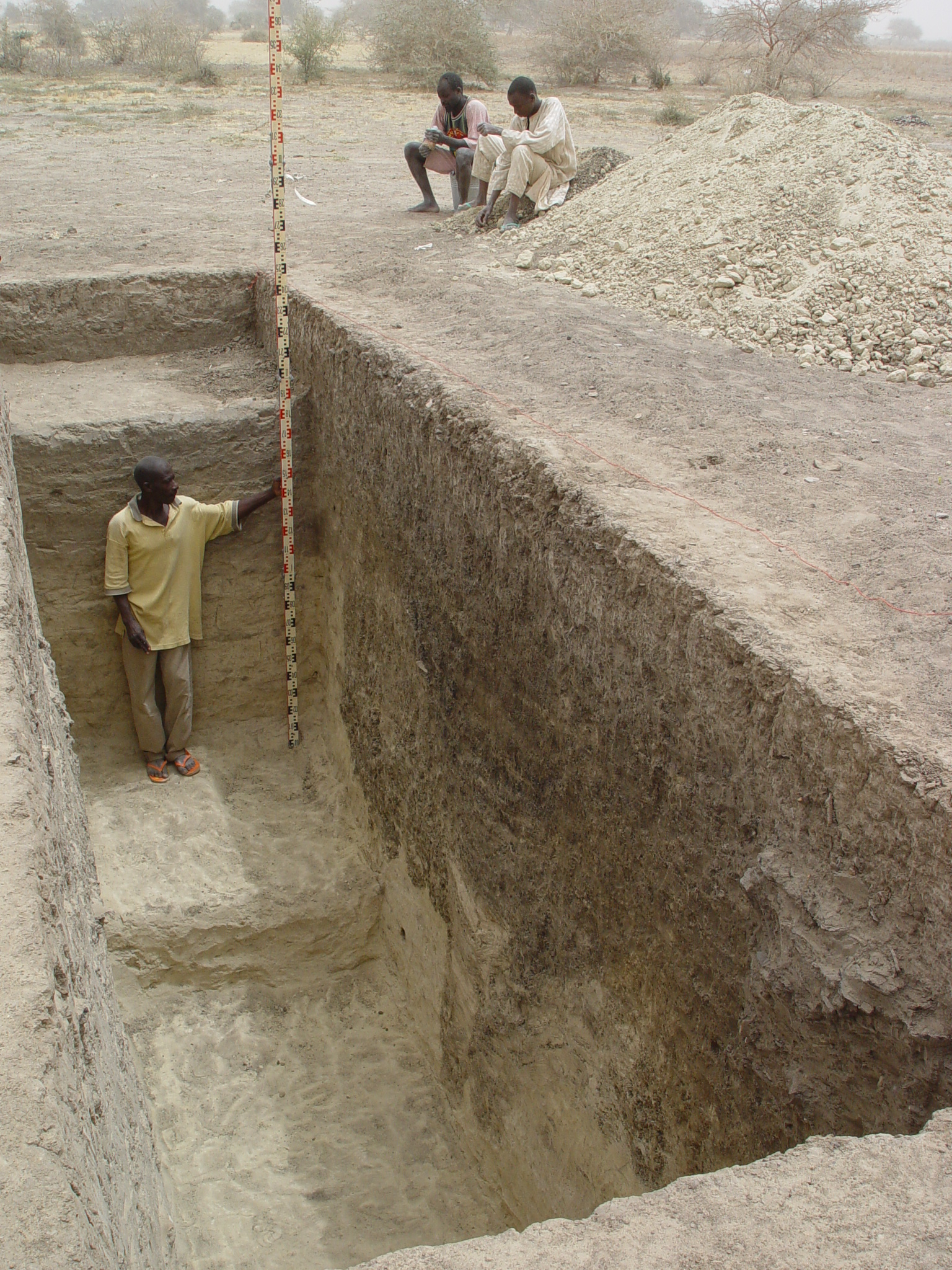
Zilum cutting southern ditch section

== Micro-botanical evidence ==
Unlike similar storage pits in the region, a pit in Zilum was discovered to be empty of any organic botanical material, including charred remains. Despite this, archaeologists Ahmed Gamal-El-Din Fahmy and Carlos Magnavita were able to separate an assemblage of fossil phytoliths from the pit through the use of liquid ZnBr_{2} / HCl (zinc bromide / hydrogen chloride). Fossil phytoliths are advantageous for archaeologists as they form part of plant tissues that are more resistant to wind, meaning traces of a plant can still be unearthed even after more common evidence, like pollen and charcoal, has disappeared. Morphotypical analysis of these phytoliths, when compared with paleoethnobotanical knowledge of the surrounding region, resulted in the interpretation that this pit was used to store plants of the family Poaceae. Although the study of micro-botanical evidence is not able to determine a genus of the phytoliths, the study of plant macro-remains at this site concludes that Pennisetum glaucum, or pearl millet, was the staple crop and only cereal of the inhabitants of Zilum.

== Ceramic analysis ==
The vast majority of ceramic findings excavated from Zilum consist of small, clay figurines that depict anthropomorphic and zoomorphic figures. Although the last phase of the Gajiganna culture (Phase III) saw cultural, social, and economic changes that likely affected many aspects of life, the Gajiganna clay figurine tradition remains more or less the same. As in figurines from sites dated to Phase I and Phase II, clay figurines from Zilum depict bovid animals (mainly cattle) and follow the same simple stylization of round bodies, stumpy legs, indications of horns, and sometimes attached tails. It is unknown whether the simple form is indicative of intended style or a lack of skill.

Sites in the Walasa area of northeastern Nigeria, like Magaba and Malankari, from the late first millennium BCE begin to show changes in the artistic tradition, particularly in the size of anthropomorphic clay figurines and more diverse representations of animal figures.

== Economy ==
=== Diet ===
Archaeological and paleoethnobotanical evidence suggests that the inhabitants of Zilum relied more heavily on the cultivation of edible plants, like pearl millet and cowpeas, than on the consumption of meat. The large amount of storage pits aids in this interpretation, as does a marked decline in the amount of animal remains recovered from Zilum's settlement deposits as compared to other Gajiganna sites of previous phases in the region. Other communities within the Gajiganna culture had economies based heavily on the husbandry of animals like cattle, sheep, and goat. The foraging of wild plants and fishing also played roles in communities of this culture.

=== Craft ===
The economy of Zilum did not rely exclusively on the production of food. Through the mapping of finds, two distinct concentrations of artifacts were found that can be related to craft activity. The first was found in the southern part of the site and is consisted of tools for pottery production, particularly ceramic tampers. The second was found in the eastern section of the site and consists of grooved stones, suggested to be related to the production of stone beads or bone points.

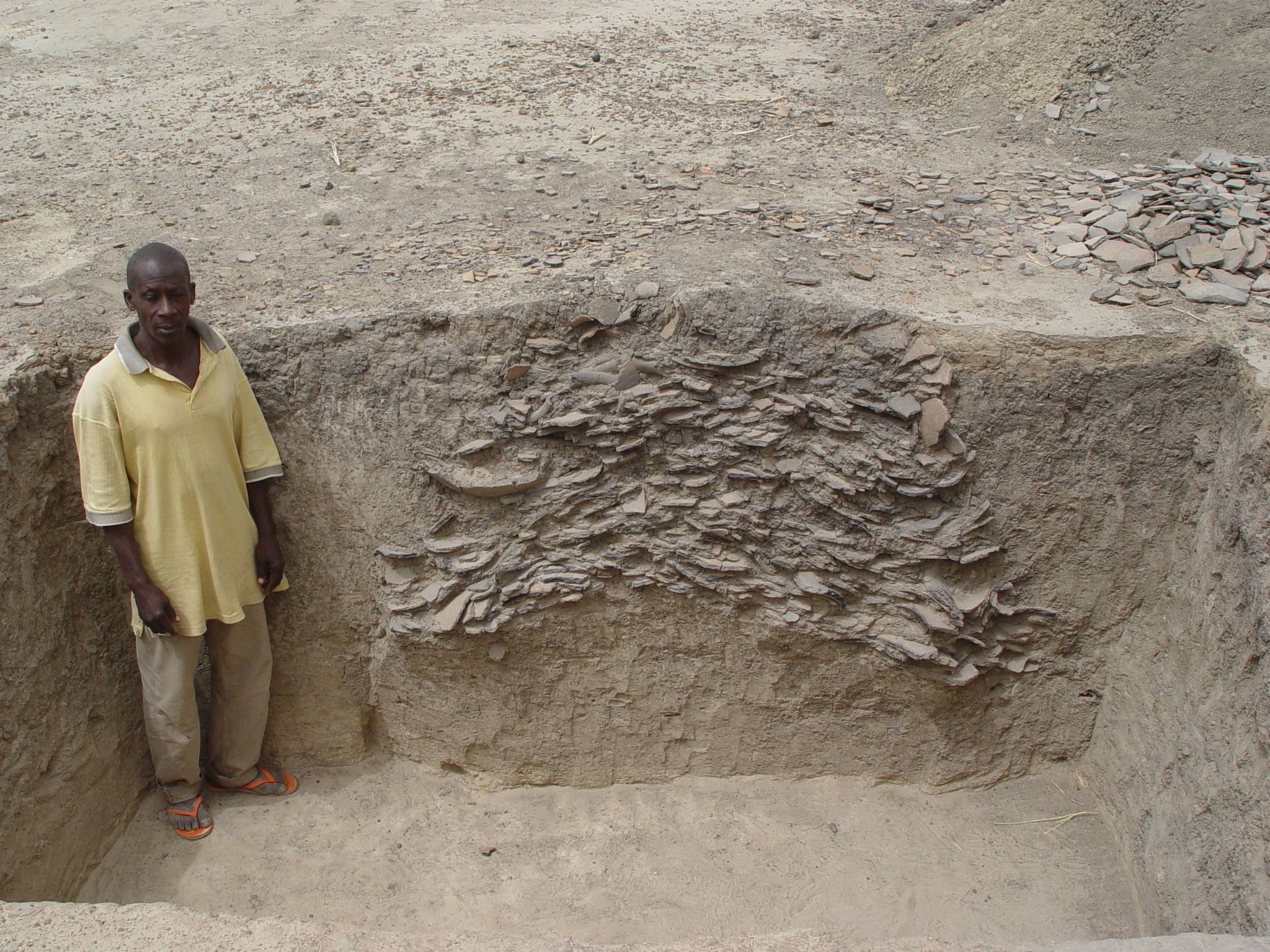
Zilum cutting refuse pit

In the central region of the surveyed site, a concentration of archaeological features was find, likely relating to craft activity. A series of pits in varying sizes were discovered to have been lined with a layer of clay. Chemical analysis of this layer showed a notably high concentration of elementary sulphur and dimethyltrisulfid, neither of which occur naturally in clay and are thus thought to be associated with human activity. These pits are likely related to the tanning of skins as the arrangement of pits can be compared to modern facilities in West Africa where sodium sulphate is used as a tawing agent, which may account for the high concentrations in the clay lining.

This craft-related evidence, paired with the ceramic findings discussed here later, led archaeologists to conclude that artisans inhabited Zilum and likely produced a large portion of the material culture for the larger community. This conclusion is furthered by the high population density (1,750-2,500 people on the 12-hectare settlement) as it is unlikely that each household would possess the skill required to create their own pottery, especially in regard to large storage vessels.

=== Evidence for a hierarchical society ===
Contemporary sites in the immediate and farther vicinity of Zilum have been discovered and surveyed. As of 2006, fourteen distinct settlements have all been dated using pottery analogy to be potentially contemporaneous with Zilum. These settlements vary in size with the largest, Galgalkura A, likely to have been at least the size of Zilum itself. It is thought that the size differences point to site-size hierarchy, which is unseen in previous Gajiganna phases. This site-size hierarchy becomes apparent near Zilum as it is encircled by sites between 2.5 and 4.0 km of smaller size, with Zilum seeming to have been above these settlement groups. According to Carlos Magnavita, it is very probable that Zilum consisted of a fortified and nucleated settlement that, assuming the contemporaneity of the neighboring sites, likely oversaw a size-based hierarchy in the mid-first millennium BCE.

== Gallery ==
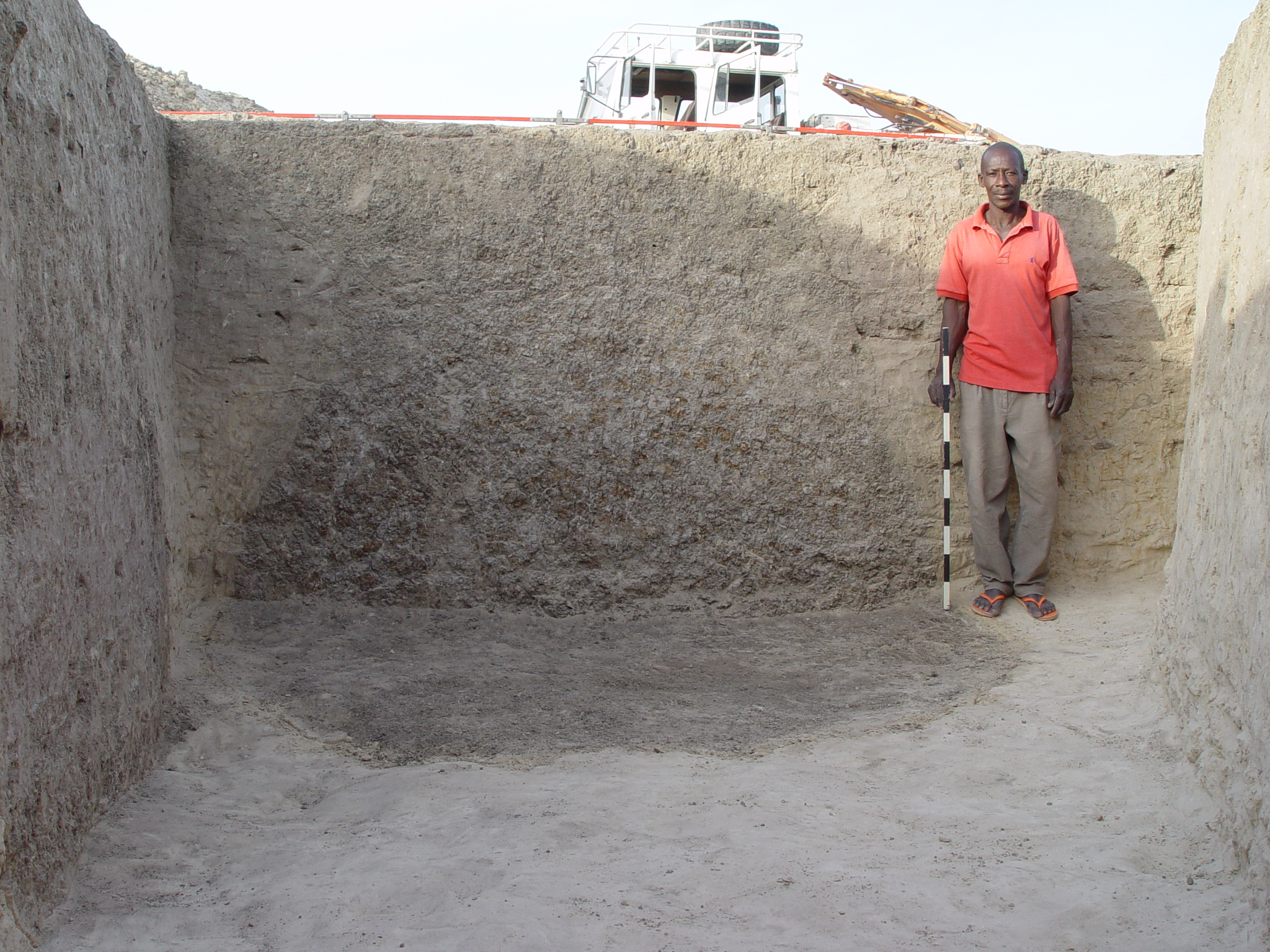
Cutting of a storage pit; Zilum, circa 600-400 BCE; Carlos Magnavita's personal photo

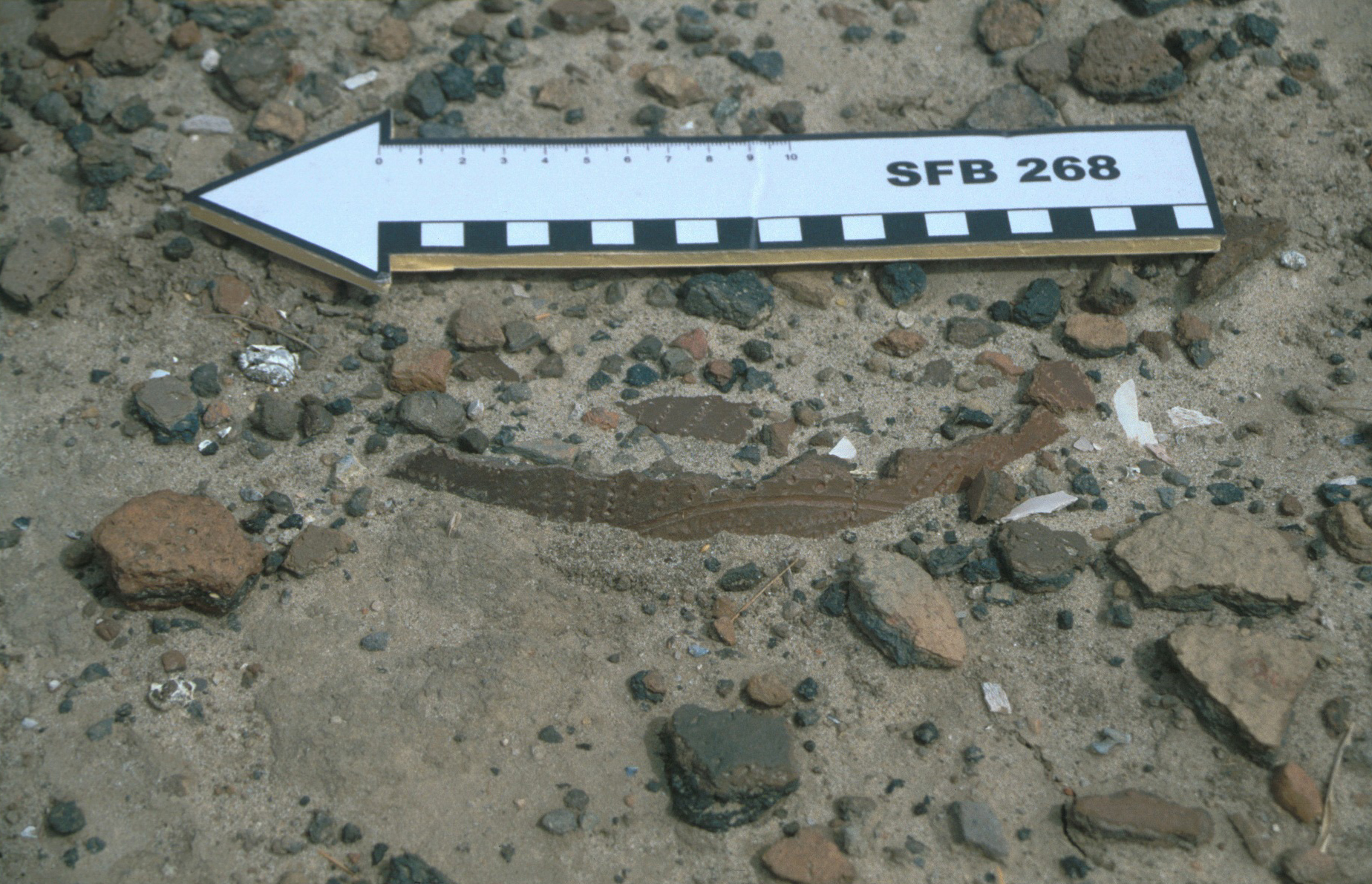
Fragments of comb impressed pottery; Zilum, circa 600-400 BCE; Carlos Magnavita's personal photo
