= Selema III =

Mai of the Kanem–Bornu Empire
- Reign: 14th century (1–5 years) c. 1322–1326 (Note: King lists (girgams) and chronicles translated in the 19th–20th centuries assign Selema a reign of 1 year and 5 months (Landeroin), 2 years (Nachtigal), 3 years (Urvoy), 4 years (Barth), or 5 years (Palmer). Due to this and to differing dates and calculations for other mais, various dates have been given for his reign, including 1346–1349 (Barth), 1342/1343–1347/1348 (Palmer), 1320–1323 (Urvoy), and 1349–1351 (Landeroin). Cohen (1966) considered a reign of 4 years most likely. Lange (1984) dated Selema's reign to 1335–1339, Stewart (1989) dated it to 1346–1350, and Bosworth (2012) dated it to 1322–1326.)
- Predecessor: Abdullah II Kademi
- Successor: Kure I Gana
- Died: c. 1326 "Yúsub" or "N'difu"
- Dynasty: Sayfawa dynasty
- Father: Abdullah II Kademi
- Mother: Kime

Selema III (Sǝlǝma (Note: The ǝ:s in Sǝlǝma are pronounced similar to the oo sound in book or look. Sǝlǝma means "black" or "dark-skinned" in Kanuri and may be a nickname. In Selema III's case, the name is also recorded as Selma, Tsilim, and Salmama.) bin ʿAbdallāh) was mai (ruler) of the Kanem–Bornu Empire in the early 14th century, ruling approximately 1322–1326.

== Life ==
Selema was a son of mai Abdullah II Kademi. His mother was named Kime. Selema succeeded his father as mai in the early 14th century. His reign was a turbulent one, as Kanem came under attack from the Sao groups of southern Lake Chad. Selema's predecessors had greatly reduced the Sao, but had not succeeded in wiping them out or fully occupying their territory. The Sao rose against the empire in Selema's time and were apparently a great threat. Later tradition attributed the initial success of the Sao to a curse placed upon Selema's father by an "afflicted mother".

After a short reign, Selema was killed in battle against the Sao. The site of Selema's death is recorded as Yúsub or N'difu. He was succeeded as mai by his brother Kure I Gana.
