= Sao civilisation =

Central African civilization

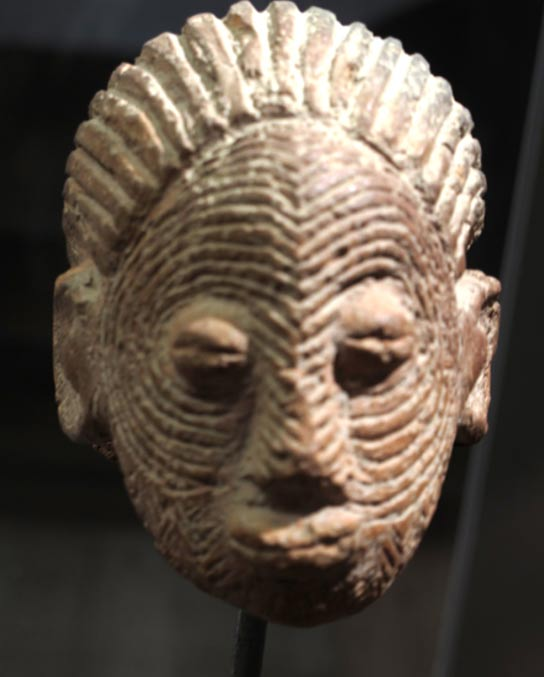
Terracotta Sao statuette

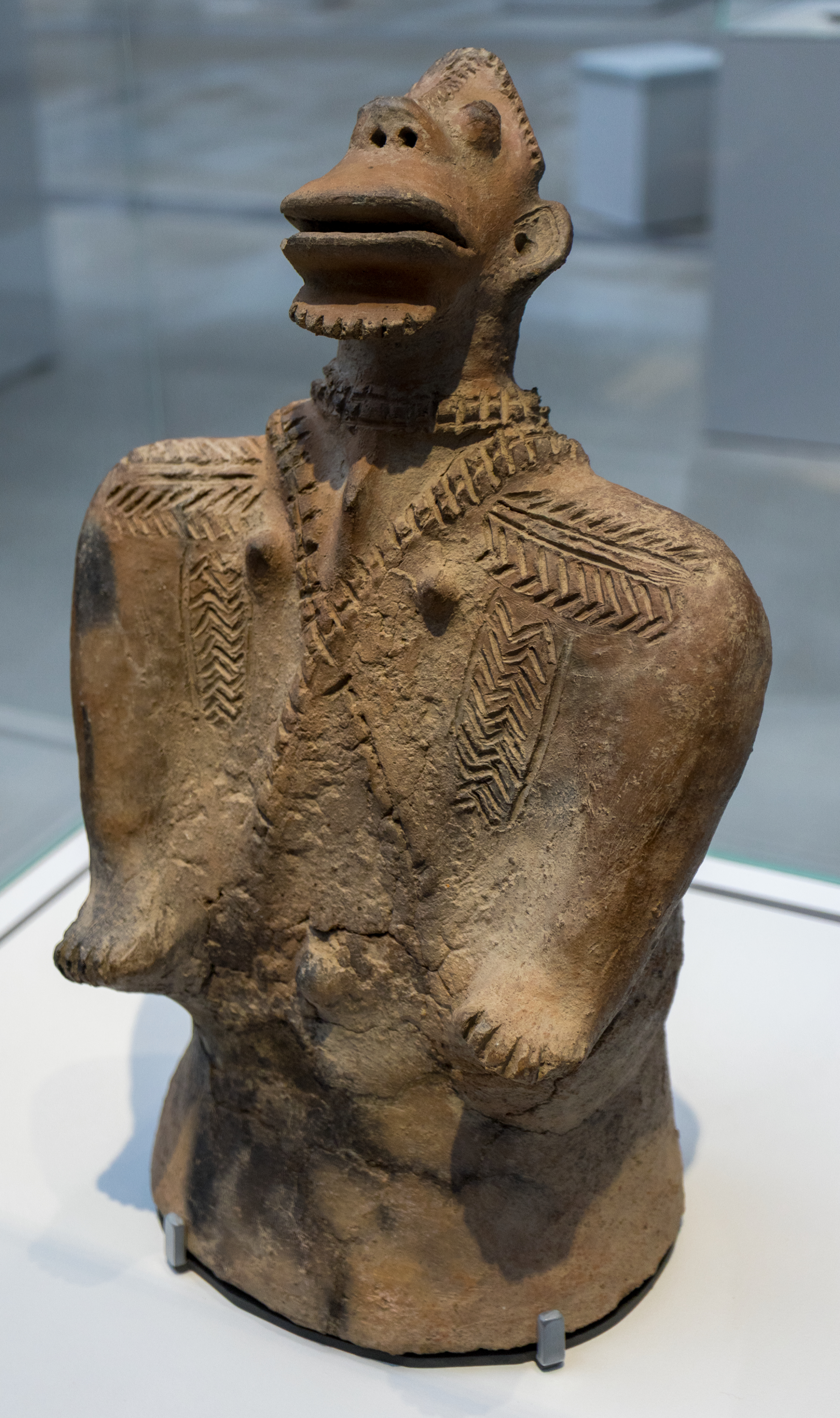
Anthropomorphic statuette, Tago site, Chad (700-1000) - Musée du quai Branly – Jacques Chirac

The Sao civilization (also called So) flourished in Central Africa from around 2000 BC, to as late as the 16th century AD. The Sao lived by the Chari River basin in territory that later became part of Cameroon and Chad. They were the earliest civilization to have left clear traces of their presence in the territory of modern Chad and Cameroon. Sometime around the 16th century, conversion to Islam changed the cultural identity of the former Sao. Today, several ethnic groups of northern Cameroon and southern Chad, but particularly the Sara and Kotoko, claim descent from the civilization of the Sao.

== Origins ==
The Sao civilization is hypothesized to have descended from the earlier Gajiganna culture of Lake Chad, which dated from about the 18th to the 9th century BCE, eventually taking Sao form between the 11th and 4th centuries BCE, such that, by the end of the first millennium BCE, Sao presence was well established around Lake Chad and near the Chari River. The city-states of the Sao reached their apex sometime between the ninth and fifteenth centuries CE.

Although some scholars estimate that the Sao civilization south of Lake Chad lasted until the fourteenth or fifteenth century, the majority opinion is that it ceased to exist as a separate culture sometime in the 16th century after the expansion of the Bornu Empire. The Kotoko are the inheritors of the former city states of the Sao.

== Culture ==
A widely accepted theory is that the Sao were indigenous inhabitants of the Lake Chad basin and that their ultimate origins lie south of the lake. Recent archaeological research indicates that the Sao civilization developed indigenously from earlier cultures in the region (such as the Gajiganna culture, which began at around 1,800 BCE and began to build fortified towns by about 800 BCE), gradually increasing in complexity. Sites like Zilum of the Chad Basin are examples of this. Sao artifacts show that they were a sophisticated civilization working in bronze, copper, and iron. Findings include bronze sculptures and terra cotta statues of human and animal figures, coins, funerary urns, household utensils, jewelry, highly decorated pottery, and spears. The largest Sao archaeological finds have been made south of Lake Chad.

G.T. Stride presented these important facts about the Sao civilization:

The So people possessed considerable political and artistic genius. Although they never combined effectively to form an empire, they developed city-states which were the centres of intense local patriotism ... Each city was surrounded by strong defensive walls and dominated the life of the surrounding countryside which it both protected and governed. Government was by an elaborate hierarchy, headed by a divine ruler ... Except on ceremonial occasions, the rulers made few public appearances and even then remained concealed from the common gaze by a screen. Women occupied a respected position in society and the Queen Mother and senior sister of the ruler exercised considerable political influence on the government of the states. The So people were mainly settled farmers but among them were craftsmen of considerable industrial and artistic merit. They were able to work in both clay and metals to manufacture household utensils, tools, and works of art for religious purposes. Impressive objects found by archaeologists include burial urns and ... figures of animals and human beings both in clay and bronze. All this had been achieved ... before about A. D. 700 ... The vigour of the government and civilization is best demonstrated by their long resistance to the empires of Kanem and Bornu [sic] and the fact that many cultural characteristics of the Kanuri [were later] adopted from the So.

— G.T. Stride, Peoples and Empires of West Africa

Ethnic groups in the Lake Chad basin, such as the Buduma, Gamergu, Kanembu, Kotoko, and Musgum claim descent from the Sao. Lebeuf supports this connection and has traced symbolism from Sao art in works by the Guti and Tukuri subgroups of the Logone-Birni people. Oral histories add further details about the people: the Sao were made up of several patrilineal clans who were united into a single polity with one language, race, and religion. In these narratives, the Sao are presented as giants and mighty warriors who fought and conquered their neighbors.

== Bibliography ==
- DeLancey, Mark W.; DeLancey, Mark Dike (2000). Historical Dictionary of the Republic of Cameroon (3rd ed.). Scarecrow Press. ISBN 978-0-8108-3775-1. – Fifth edition (2019) at Google Books
- Fanso, Verkijika G. (1989). Cameroon History for Secondary Schools and Colleges. Vol. 1. Macmillan. ISBN 978-0-333-47121-0.
- Hudgens, Jim; Trillo, Richard (1999). The Rough Guide to West Africa (3rd ed.). Rough Guides. – Fifth edition (2008) at Google Books
- Insoll, Timothy (2003). The Archaeology of Islam in Sub-Saharan Africa. Cambridge World Archaeology. Cambridge University Press. ISBN 978-0-521-65702-0.
- Lebeuf, Annie M. D. (1969). Les principautés kotoko: essai sur le caractère sacré de lʼautorité [The Kotoko Principalities: An Essay on the Sacredness of Authority] (in French). Éditions du Centre national de la recherche scientifique.
- Lebeuf, Jean-Paul; Detourbet, A. Masson (1950). La civilisation du Tchad suivi d'une étude sur les bronzes Sao [The Civilization of Chad: Followed by a Study on Sao Bronzes] (in French). Paris: Payot.
- Levtzion, Nehemia; Hopkins, J.F.P. (1981). Corpus of Early African Sources for West African History. Cambridge University Press. ISBN 978-0-521-22422-2.
- Palmer, Herbert Richmond (1967) [1928]. Sudanese Memoirs. Being mainly translations of a number of Arabic Manuscripts relating to the Central and Western Sudan. Vol. 3 volumes. Taylor & Francis. doi:10.4324/9780429057847. ISBN 978-0-4290-5784-7. S2CID 197522624.
- Stride, G.T.; Ifeka, Caroline (1971). Peoples and Empires of West Africa: West Africa in History, 1000-1800. Nelson. ISBN 978-0-17-511448-1.
- Walker, Robin (2011). When We Ruled: The Ancient and Mediæval History of Black Civilisations. Black Classic Press. ISBN 978-1-58073-045-7.
- West, Ben (2011). Cameroon (3rd ed.). Bradt Travel Guides. ISBN 978-1-84162-353-5.
