= Richmond Palmer =

English barrister and colonial supervisor (1877–1958)

Sir Richmond Palmer KCMG CBE
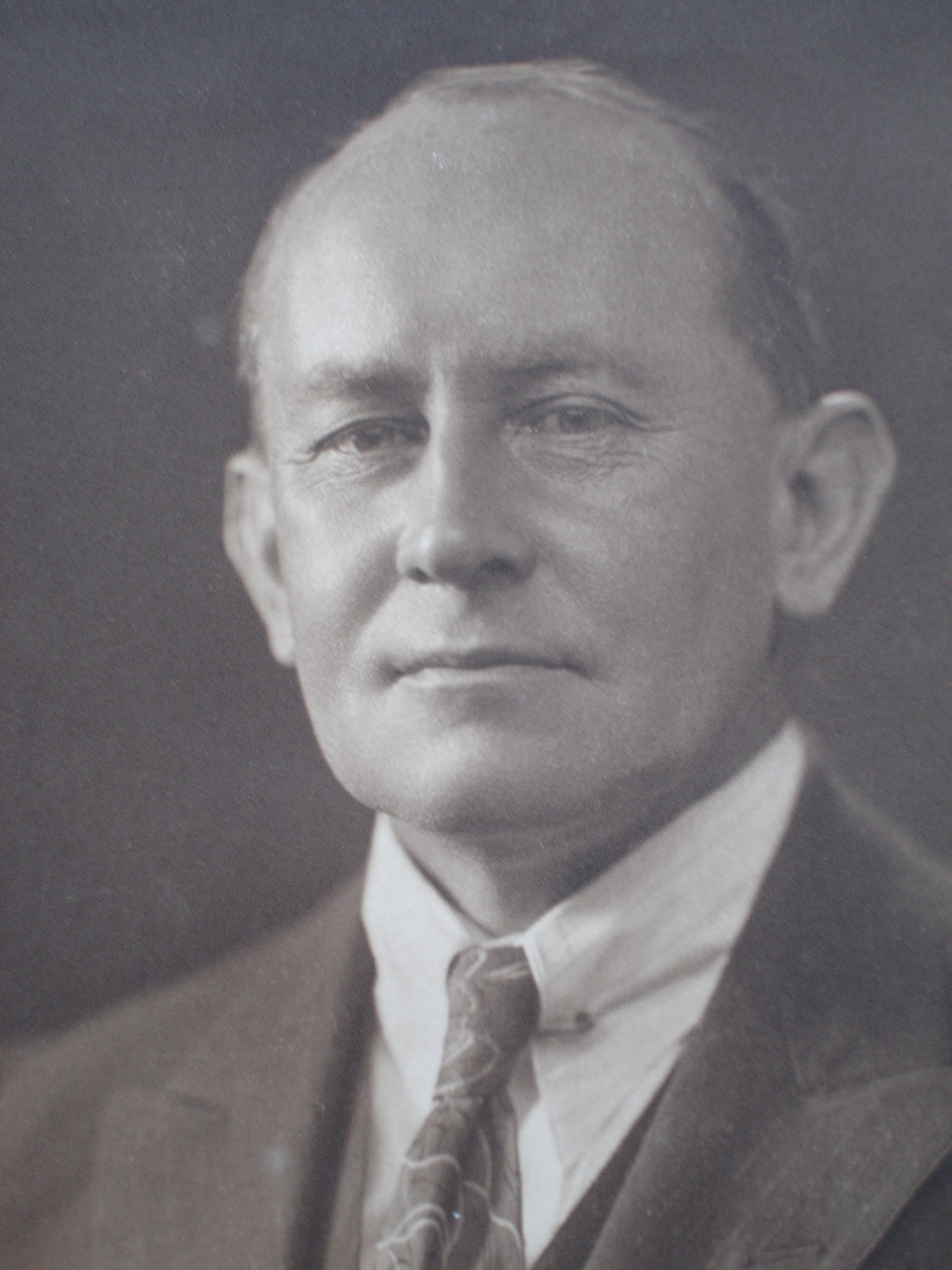

Lieutenant Governor of Northern Nigeria
- In office 11 September 1925 – 12 April 1930
- Monarch: George V
- Prime Minister: Stanley Baldwin; Ramsay MacDonald
- Preceded by: William Frederick Gowers
- Succeeded by: Cyril Wilson Alexander

Governor of the Gambia
- In office 11 September 1930 – 12 April 1934
- Monarch: George V
- Prime Minister: Ramsay MacDonald
- Preceded by: Edward Brandis Denham
- Succeeded by: Arthur Richards, 1st Baron Milverton

Governor of Cyprus
- In office 8 November 1933 – 4 July 1938
- Monarchs: George V Edward VIII; George VI
- Prime Minister: Ramsay MacDonald; Stanley Baldwin; Neville Chamberlain
- Preceded by: Reginald Edward Stubbs
- Succeeded by: William Denis Battershill

Personal details
- Born: 20 April 1877 Lancaster, England, United Kingdom
- Died: 22 May 1958 (aged 81)
- Spouse(s): Margaret Isabel Smith, married 7 June 1924, two children

Sir Herbert Richmond Palmer KCMG CBE (20 April 1877 – 22 May 1958) was an English barrister, who became a colonial supervisor for Britain during the inter-World War period. He served as a lieutenant governor in Nigeria, governor and Commander-in-Chief of The Gambia and governor and Commander-in-Chief of Cyprus.

== Early life ==
Palmer was born in 1877 in Lancaster to Robert Palmer, a banker, of The Bank House, Kirkby Lonsdale and Mary Chippendall, who were married on 11 May 1867 at Lancaster Priory. Mary was the great-granddaughter of John Higgin who was governor of Lancaster Castle from 1783 to 1833.

Palmer was educated at Oundle School in Northamptonshire, being recorded in 1895 as an exceptional batsman. He went up to Trinity Hall, Cambridge in 1896 as a scholar reading Classics. He was awarded his BA in 1899, and his Bachelor of Laws a year later.

While at Cambridge, he played club rugby for Cambridge University and was awarded a Blue, playing wing three-quarter, in 1899 in the rugby Varsity match against Oxford. In 1899 he became a member of Percy Carpmael's invitational touring team, The Barbarians.

Too young to be called the Bar, he worked his passage to California as a stoker in 1903 to explore opportunities in gold mining.

Returning through San Francisco, he was called to The Bar on 15 June 1904 and was admitted to the Middle Temple. He was awarded Master of Arts in 1910.

== Colonial Service ==
=== Nigeria ===
Palmer spent the greater part of his long official service in Nigeria. His first posting was under Lugard, High Commissioner of the Northern Nigeria Protectorate, a position held by Lugard until 1906.

Palmer was appointed an assistant Resident in the Provinces of Nigeria in 1904. One of his early acts was to work towards the abolition of slavery that was still to be found in the Northern Provinces.

The appointment of Palmer as Resident in 1905 was a turning point in the history of British rule in Katsina. When he assumed office, the first task which Palmer accomplished was the re-organization of districts, in which nineteen new districts were created. Each of these was placed under the jurisdiction of a district head responsible to the Emir. The newly created districts were further divided into sub-districts, to allow for proper administration of the Emirate from the grassroots. Palmer installed Muhammadu Dikko as Emir of Katsina in 1906 largely due to his co-operation with the British administration. This was an early example of Palmer adopting the Lugard doctrine of Indirect Rule.

He was one of the most prominent of the band of political officers who guarded and guided the destinies of the Northern Nigerian Emirates and other political units, in the formative years round about 1910. By 1911, Palmer was Commissioner of Native Revenue in the north of the country. Their planning was accepted and confirmed by Lugard on his return.

In 1912, Lugard returned from Hong Kong to Nigeria as governor of the northern and southern protectorates. Lugard's main mission was to complete the amalgamation into one colony. Although controversial in Lagos, where it was opposed by a large section of the political class and the media, the amalgamation did not arouse passion in the rest of the country. From 1914 to 1919, Lugard was Governor General of the now combined Colony of Nigeria.

Palmer acted as Resident of Kano Province between 1915 and 1916 and, in 1917, was promoted to Resident of Bornu Province.

He maintained the relationships which Lugard has established with the Sokoto Caliphate and the Sultan of Sokoto and, as Lugard, worked through Nigerian traditional rulers. Palmer was a staunch advocate of the principles of Indirect Rule or devolved colonial administration which had been devised by Lugard and his successors in the government of Northern Nigeria. It greatly enhanced the prestige and influence of the traditional Muslim emirs and contributed to the rapid spread of Islam during the colonial era. The position of the Emirs was supported by Palmer and he strongly opposed the work of Christian missionaries, for example in Borno, contrary to the views of the governor, Sir Hugh Clifford.

Owing to the Great War, the duties of senior administrative officers in Northern Nigeria were especially arduous at that time. By the end of 1917 some 6,600 troops had been dispatched to East Africa to take part in the operations against Von Lettow's forces, and a further 1,800 were awaiting transport – a serious depletion of the garrison of the country. Palmer carefully considered the effects of the War on the Muslim provinces and was highly critical of the French Administration in their colony nearby.

Palmer studied the culture, languages and literature of Africa becoming an outstanding Hausa and Arabic scholar and an acknowledged authority on civilisation and literature of Hausa and Fulani.

Throughout the Northern Nigeria Protectorate there were then thousands of Muslim schools in which practically the entire time of the pupils was occupied in learning by heart and in writing portions of the Koran. Palmer, who was deeply interested in education, was anxious to improve on this system, and it was natural that he should turn his eyes towards the Gordon College at Khartoum, where important steps had been taken to improve Muslim education in the Sudan. He therefore made an arduous and adventurous journey in 1918 across Central Africa from Borno by way of Wadai and Darfur to the Sudan. This visit bore fruit when a training college for Muslim teachers was opened in 1922 at Katsina and attracted a promising number of candidates.

Palmer acted as Lieutenant Governor of Northern Nigeria from 1921, and was promoted to the substantive appointment in 1925 based in Kaduna.

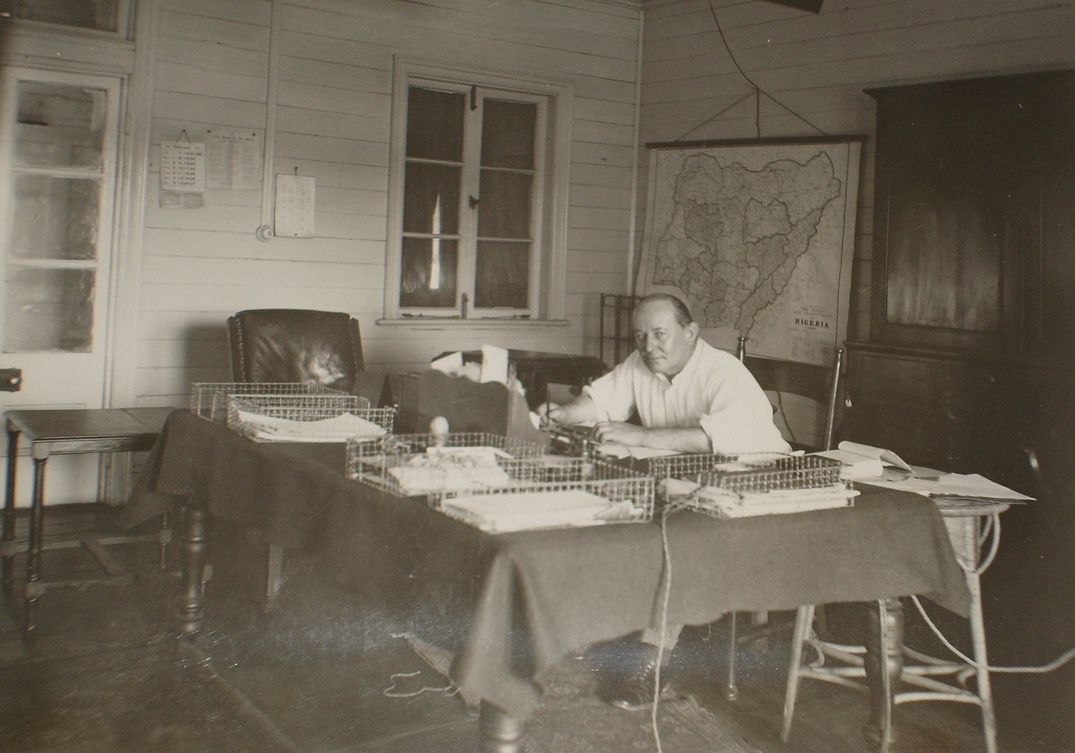
Sir Richmond Palmer Government House, Kaduna 1926

He was a first class administrator described as "capax imperii", capable of (ruling the) Empire, with his understanding and study of languages and was referred to locally as "Judgey", being the highest judicial authority.

In 1919 steps had already been taken to develop the important cotton and ground-nut industries, and experimental work in tobacco cultivation had been started. Later, in 1926, work was begun on a scheme for utilising the waters of the Kaduna River for the supply of the town. Progress was also made in the construction of new European hospitals at Enugu, Jos and Kano in the province. Another important event was the journey undertaken by Palmer from Lagos to Lake Chad in March and April, this being the first occasion on which the entire distance had been traversed by motor transport.

During the 26 years spent by Palmer in various part of Northern Nigeria much of his leisure was occupied in attempts to find data for the completion of a true history of the more important units of ruling races, such as the Fulbe and Kanuri of Borno. In his journey across Africa in 1918, he was able to obtain first-hand information on matters connected with this subject. The results of these studies were embodied in a work entitled Sudanese Memoirs, the last volume of which was published in 1928. This work was supplemented by a book entitled The Bornu Sahara and Sudan and published in 1936.

In December 1929, Palmer argued strongly for decentralisation of funding to leave discretion of expenditure to be determined within the Northern Provinces. He was not able to persuade the Governor Sir Graeme Thomson nor the Secretary of State of the merits of allowing an overall budget to be allocated to the lieutenant governor. This issue remains a matter of debate to this day. It may be that this dispute prompted his move to The Gambia.

His departure from Nigeria was announced in February 1930.

=== The Gambia ===
In September 1930, Palmer was promoted to governor and Commander-in-Chief of The Gambia. In this colony he was naturally faced with problems on a smaller scale than in the vast territories of Northern Nigeria, but in 1931 he was called upon to deal with a serious outbreak of rinderpest and pleuropneumonia among the native cattle. In 1932 he effected more continuity in the administration of the Protectorate by the establishment of a definite administrative headquarters in each of the four provinces with provincial offices which were to remain open for business throughout the Year. A small collection of artefacts from megalithic circles in The Gambia can be found in the British Museum's study collection that was donated by Palmer.

On 12 April 1933, he left Africa.

=== Cyprus ===
On 8 November 1933, Palmer became governor and Commander-in Chief of Cyprus. Cyprus had been annexed by Britain when the Ottoman Empire joined with Germany and Austro-Hungary in World War I and, in 1925, had become a British Crown Colony. In 1931, there had been serious riots of Greek Cypriots demanding Enosis, the union with Greece. Government House in Nicosia had been burned down.

He also arrived in the middle of a two years' drought which brought the Cypriots to the brink of famine, destroyed a great proportion of their crops and livestock, and added to their heavy burden of debt.

Palmer therefore found himself having to govern at a difficult time of high tensions in the island with Cypriots seeking self-determination. One of the causes was failure of Colonial officials in too many cases to learn Greek or Turkish, the languages of the island, and of their consequent lack of touch with the inhabitants. Palmer insisted upon a knowledge of these languages.

His rule in Cyprus was a strict one and his style of leadership was known to the people of Cyprus as "Palmerist dictatorship" or "Palmerocracy" (Greek: Παλμεροκρατία).

There he completed the scheme for the improvement of the port of Famagusta. A scheme for the reconstruction and development of the port was started in May 1931, and all work under contract was completed in March 1933. Subsidiary work on the scheme was completed in 1935, and the new harbour, which could not previously take ships of more than 2,000 tons, was enlarged to accommodate ships of from 8,000 to 9,000 tons.

He retired on 4 July 1939.

=== Honours ===
He was awarded several honours throughout his career, being appointed C.M.G in 1922, C.B.E in 1924 and K.C.M.G in 1933. He was also appointed a Knight of Grace of the Order of St. John on 22 May 1936.

== Later life ==
Palmer returned to Langham House, Oakham in Rutland. In July 1940, after his family were evacuated to the United States of America, he went to live in Keswick to practice as a barrister in Liverpool and on the Northern Circuit providing legal aid.

He wrote extensively about his African experiences in retirement.

== Publications ==
He wrote a number of translations of Arabic texts associated with the countries in which he worked:

- History of the First Twelve Years of the Reign of Mai Idris Alooma of Bornu, Lagos (1926) reprinted London (1970)
- Sudanese Memoirs: Being Mainly Translations of a Number of Arabic Manuscripts Relating to the Central and Western Sudan, 3 volumes, Lagos (1928), reprinted London (1967)
- The Bornu, Sahara and Sudan, London (1936)

He wrote the Foreword and arranged the publication of The Occupation of the Hausaland: Being a Translation of Arabic letters found in the House of the Wazir of Sokoto, in 1903, collected by Major G Merrick and translated and edited by Mr H F Backwell, Lagos (1927).

He also contributed to anthropological journals:

- Notes on some Asben records, Journal of the African Society vol 9 – 1909–10, – pp. 388–400
- An early Fulani conception of Islam, Journal of African Society XIV, – 1914–15, – pp. 53–59
- Western Sudan history : the Raudthât'ul Alfâri, Journal of the African Society15 -, 1915–16, – pp. 261–73
- History of Katsina, Journal of the African Society, 26, 103, – April 1927, – pp. 216–236
- The Kano Chronicle, Journal of the Anthropological Institute, 38 – 1909 – pp. 58–98

== Family ==
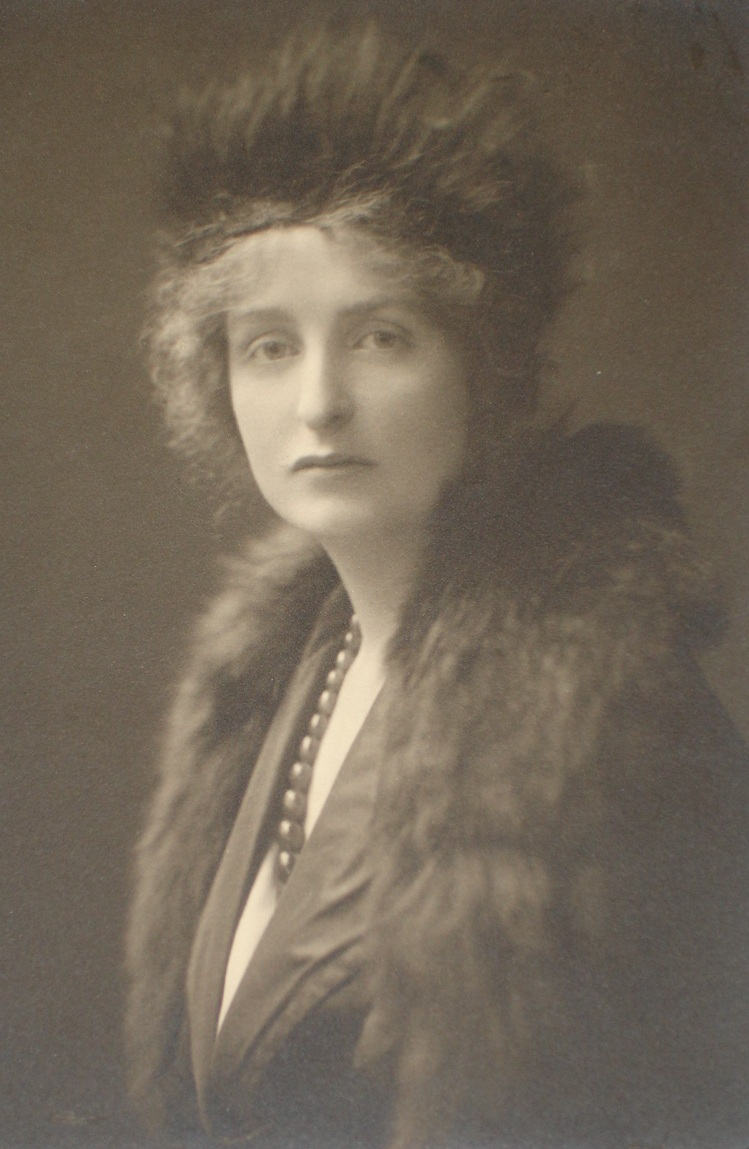
Margaret Isabel Smith

He married Margaret Isabel Smith of Goldings on 7 June 1924 at St Michael and All Angels in Waterford, the Archbishop of York Cosmo Gordon Lang officiating. Margaret Isabel was the daughter of Reginald Abel Smith J.P., of Goldings near Waterford and Hon. Margaret Alice Holland, the daughter of Henry Holland, 1st Viscount Knutsford.

They had two daughters. Their elder daughter, Jenifer, married Edward Anthony Watson Bullock, younger son of Sir Christopher Bullock. Their younger daughter, Virginia, married Sir Paul Studholme Bt.

Government offices
Preceded by William Frederick Gowers	Lieutenant-Governor of Nigeria; 1925–1930	Succeeded by
Preceded by Edward Brandis Denham	Governor of The Gambia; 1930–1933	Succeeded by Arthur Richards, 1st Baron Milverton
Preceded by Reginald Edward Stubbs	Governor of Cyprus; 1933–1939	Succeeded by William Denis Battershill
