= Abd al-Qadir dan Tafa =

Sokoto historian (1804 – 1863/4)

Sheikh Dan Tafa
- Born: Abd al-Qādir ibn al-Mustafa ibn Muhammad al-Tūrūdī; 1804; Fankaaji, Gobir
- Died: 1863-4; Salame, Sokoto
- Spouse: Two wives both named Fatima
- Children: Nine sons and two daughters
- Parents: Mallam Tafa (father); Khadija (mother)

Academic background
- Influences: Abdullahi Fodio; Usman Fodio

Academic work
- Era: Sokoto Revolution
- Main interests: Falsafa; History; Sufism
- Notable works: Rawdat al-afkar (1824)

Abd al-Qadir dan Tafa (1804 – 1863/4), also known as Dan Tafa, was a historian, theologian, philosopher, poet and jurist from the Sokoto caliphate. He was considered the "most learned" scholar of his time. He was a prolific scholar who delved into various fields of knowledge, but he was particularly renowned for his historical and philosophical writings.

Dan Tafa lived during a turbulent time in Hausaland, witnessing the Sokoto jihad and the subsequent establishment of the Sokoto Caliphate. Following the deaths of the three reformist leaders, Usman, Abdullahi, and Muhammad Bello, Dan Tafa became a sought-after figure for his wisdom and expertise on matters of history, Islam, and leadership. He played a significant role in education by running an educational institute in Salame, which drew scholars from different parts of West Africa, notably from Timbuktu.

== Name ==
Sheikh Dan Tafa, originally named Abd Al-Qadir ibn al-Mustafa, was given the nickname "Dan Tafa," which translates to "son of Tafa" in the Hausa language. This name is derived from his father's name, Mustafa, and was shortened to Tafa. His father, Mustafa, was a respected and learned figure in their community, hence he was referred to as Mallam Tafa, with "Mallam" signifying "learned man" in Hausa.

== Life ==
=== Early life ===
Dan Tafa was born in 1804 in Fankaaji, a village in Gobir, just before the hijrah that marked the beginning of the Sokoto revolution. The hijrah was delayed due to his birth. His mother, Khadijah, was the eldest daughter of Usman dan Fodio, the leader of the revolution. Khadijah was not only a well-respected Islamic scholar but also a prolific writer, having authored more than six works and translated the Mukhtasar of Khalil into Fulfulde. She played a significant role in educating the women of the Fodiawa family, and her sister, Nana Asma'u, was one of her notable students.

Dan Tafa's father, Sheikh Mustafa ibn Muhammad, known as Mallam Tafa, was a scholar and scribe who served as a trusted servant to Shehu Usman. He held the position of Amir al-kutaab (leader of the scribes) and librarian in the Fodiawa clan and accompanied the Shehu on his preaching tours across Hausaland before the jihad. When Usman became recognized as the Amir al-mu'minin of the Muslim community, Mallam Tafa became his chief secretary and played an important role in selecting the next Caliph, notably Sultan Abu Bakr Atiku's successor in 1842. Mallam Tafa's main teacher and mentor was Abdullahi dan Fodio, who encouraged him to establish an educational institute. Sultan Muhammad Bello provided him with land near Sokoto, known as Dama, where he founded the institute that attracted students from all over the caliphate. Mallam Tafa diligently ran this institute until his passing in 1856. After his passing, Dan Tafa took charge of the institute and its popularity continued to grow. Scholars from as far as Timbuktu regularly journeyed to visit this center throughout the nineteenth-century.

==== Early education ====
Both his parents laid the foundation for his understanding of Islam by acting as his first teachers. His father, Mallam Tafa, further enriched his knowledge by teaching him various subjects, including fiqh (Islamic jurisprudence), lughat (science of linguistics), tafsir (Quranic exegesis), and tarikh (history). All of these subjects were passed down to Mallam Tafa from his mentor, Abdullahi dan Fodio. As he progressed in his studies, Dan Tafa's education expanded to include more advanced aspects of the religion. His uncle, Muhammad Sanbu, taught him Sufism, gnosis, and other esoteric sciences, providing him with a deeper understanding of spiritual matters.

Additionally, Dan Tafa's uncle, Muhammad Mudi dan Laima, taught him the elemental sciences, which encompassed diverse fields such as medicine, arithmetic, and astronomy. His uncle further exposed him to philosophy, the science of magic squares (al-awfaq), and a comprehensive understanding of political science.

=== Later life ===
Dan Tafa immersed himself in scholarly pursuits, building upon the ideas and works of the deceased leaders of the Sokoto jihad, such as Usman, Abdullahi, and Muhammad Bello. His reputation as a learned scholar spread far and wide, making him a sought-after advisor for rulers and leaders in the region. On occasion, he even served as an advisor to the Caliphs. When the German explorer Heinrich Barth visited Katsina, a scholar from Tuat informed him about Dan Tafa, described as "the most learned of the present generation of the inhabitants of Sokoto."

Sheikh Dan Tafa and his relatives resided south of Salame, approximately two hours away from Chimola, a ribat located on the Rima valley, led by Ahmad ibn Sultan Abu Bakr Atiku. Dan Tafa and Ahmad developed a strong bond of friendship, with Dan Tafa serving as an advisor and confidant to Ahmad. This close relationship led Ahmad to promise Dan Tafa the prestigious position of Wazirin Sokoto if he ever became Amir al-mu'minin, the Caliph of Sokoto. The Waziri was a crucial role in the Sokoto government, considered the second most significant position. The selection of a Waziri came with specific requirements and responsibilities, such as being a renowned scholar and an expert in fiqh, which Dan Tafa fulfilled.

After the passing of Caliph Ali ibn Bello, the council in Sokoto needed to elect a successor. Abd al-Qadir dan Gidado, the Waziri of Ali, initially refused to nominate Ahmad due to the promise he made to Dan Tafa. Only after Ahmad swore to appoint Abd al-Qadir's son, Ibrahim Khalilu, as Wazirin Sokoto did Abd al-Qadir finally nominate Ahmad. Ahmad was eventually elected Caliph, and he fulfilled his promise by appointing Ibrahim Khalilu as his chief Waziri. Dan Tafa continued to assist his friend, now a Caliph, just as he had in Chimola. He retired to his ribat in Salame and continued his scholarly work, including writing and teaching. He died not long after in Salame at the age of 60 and was buried beside his mother behind the school his father established. His aunt Nana Asma'u composed an elegy for him she titled Tilfin Bawa.

=== Family ===
Abd al-Qadir was married to Fatima, a daughter of Muhammad Bello, who died a year after her husband in 1865. Not much is known about their descendants, but they had two sons named Muallayidi and Abd al-Raazqid, both of whom were respected scholars. Sheikh Muallayidi gained renown for his work on Usman dan Fodio, titled Nudha Yasira Tushir ila Ba'd karamat al-Shaykh.

Their other son, Sheikh Abd al-Raazqid, was among those who attempted to perform hijra with Caliph Muhammad Attahiru to evade the European invasion of Sokoto. He served as a trusted advisor to Caliph Attahiru. The Caliph and many of his followers were intercepted and killed in the Battle of Burmi in 1903. Before his death, Attahiru entrusted his son Muhammad Bello Mai Wurno with the authority to continue the hijra. Abd al-Raazqid managed to escape death and joined the new Caliph's hijra, eventually reaching Sudan. There, they established a new town on the Blue Nile called Maiurno (in Sennar State), and Abd al-Raazqid was appointed Waziri of the Caliph. His only surviving son, Sheikh Bello ibn Abd'r Raazqid, currently holds this position.

== Writings ==
Mallam Dan Tafa had a vast body of work that encompasses at least 72 titles, as listed in John Hunwick's catalogue of Arabic Literature of Africa vol.2. While he covered a wide range of subjects, he gained particular renown for his historical works. Among his notable contributions is Rawdat al-afkar (The Sweet Meadows of Contemplation), written in 1824, which stands as one of his well-known historical writings. Another prominent work is Mawsufat al-sudan (Description of the black lands), completed in 1864, which provides a detailed account of the history of West Africa.

Dan Tafa's interest in geography is evident in his work Qataif al-jinan (The Fruits of the Heart in Reflection about the Sudanese world), which offers a comprehensive exploration of the topography, history, and culture of both West Africa and the Maghreb.

During the controversial French Voulet-Chanoine expedition in 1898, Salame, Dan Tafa's hometown, was invaded and suffered significant devastation. Many books and manuscripts were either burnt or pillaged. Many of Dan Tafa's works and his educational institute were lost in the chaos of the invasion. At least 72 of his works remain, 44 of which are in the possession of his grand-son, Sheikh Bello ibn Abd'r Raazqid, Wazirin Maiurno.
