= Gidado dan Laima =

Grand Vizier of the Sokoto Caliphate

Gidado dan Laima (1817–1842) also known as Waziri Gidado was the first known Grand Vizier of the Sokoto Caliphate, he was vizier of Sokoto during the sultanship of Muhammed Bello. He was the founder of the popular line of viziers known as the Gidado line; some of his descendants include Waziri Junaid and Abd al-Qadir (Sokoto), and in extension, Gidado Idris who was once Nigeria’s Secretary to the Government.

Gidado was succeeded by Abd al-Qadir (Sokoto) (1842–1859) in 1842. During Hugh Clapperton's stay in Sokoto, he was under the care of his family.

== Life ==
Gidado was born Uthman (Gidado) b. Abu Bakr (Sambo Laima) b. Umar (Gabinda) b. Ahmad to a Fulani family around the year 1776. His ancestry can be traced to a group of Torodbe from Konni. Prior to the Fulani jihad, Gidado, his father and uncle were with Uthman Dan Fodio in Degel. He was close to the Dan Fodio clan, especially Muhammed Bello and shortly after the jihad, he married Asma, a daughter of dan Fodio. He was not a leader of a particular group during the jihad but sometimes acted as a messenger or special envoy. One of his crucial tasks was to collect the caliph's share of booty from Birnin Gazargamu in 1808. In his journey, he met all the Fulani leaders and his knowledge of Bornu later made him a good choice to negotiate a truce with El Kanemi.

=== Vizier ===
Following Bello's election as Amir al-mu'minin, Gidado was appointed the vizier. He continued to maintain his work as emissary and assistant of Bello but he had more freedom of judgement. On his own initiative, he retired Ishaq, the Emir of Daura and appointed, Ishaq's son in his father's stead. He was also asked to command of a joint army when El Kanemi was threatening eastern Kano. During expeditions, he was known to be by the side of Bello, however, he was less involved in writing the Sultan's correspondence as future viziers became known. When Bello died, Gidado gradually retired because relations between him and Abu Bakr Atiku, the new Sultan were not in good terms. His son Abd al-Qadir then sometimes acted as vizier.
