= Umaru bin Ali =

9th Caliph of Sokoto from 1824 to 1891

- Sarkin Musulmi (Commander of the Faithful)
- Reign: 3 October 1881 – 25 March 1891
- Predecessor: Mu'azu
- Successor: Abdur Rahman Atiku
- Died: 25 March 1891
- House: House of Bello

Umaru bin Ali (c.1824–1891) was Sultan of Sokoto from 3 October 1881 to 25 March 1891. He succeeded Sultan Mu'azu after the latter's death in September 1881. Ali was a great-grandson of Uthman dan Fodio, grandson of Muhammed Bello and son of Aliyu Babba.

Prior to becoming Sultan, Ali held the title of Sarkin Sudan and lived at a ribat in the town of Shinaka. During his reign, he mounted three expeditions. The first expedition was a follow-up of Mu'azu's campaign against Sabon Birni, while the second was against Madarunfa. The third expedition mounted was against Argungu, an aftermath of a peace proposal that was rebuffed by Argungu; the commander of the expedition team was Sarkin Lifidi Lefau. The Kebbawa came prepared and confronted the expedition in open field, and the Sokoto army was routed and Lefau killed.

Though some of the expeditions were unsuccessful in capturing major towns, there were still some war booty and presents delivered to the Sultan; the Fulani Emirs also continued to send presents to Sokoto. Some settlements were re-organized and expanded during this period, marafa Maiturare developed Gwadabawa, a quarter north of Sokoto and brought together a commendable force. Vizier Muhammad Bukhari, Sarkin Kaya and the local ruler of Bakura, expanded settlements in the eastern region of Zamfara.

In 1885, Umaru signed an important treaty with the Royal Niger Company. According to George Goldie, Sokoto agreed to give the Royal Niger Company exclusive trade privileges within its domain, and entire rights to the country on both sides of the River Benue, in return for a yearly subsidy of three thousand bags of cowrie shells.
