= Abd al-Qadir (Sokoto) =

19th-century Nigerian politician

Abd al-Qadir also known as Abdulkadir, was The Sokoto Grand Vizier (1842–1859). He was preceded by his father, Gidago dan Laima (1817–1842) and succeeded by Ibrahim Khalilu (1859-c. 1874). Prior to his appointment as vizier, Abdulkadir participated in 25 raids under Sultan Muhammed Bello and four raids with his uncle, Abu Bakr Atiku. He was a close confidant of Sultan Ali and son of Nana Asma'u

== Vizier ==
His reign as vizier was effective but it had some limitations. Abdulkadir was involved in removing Umar Nagwamatse as ruler of Katuru, Umar's reputation was that of a high living, independent and successful prince but was proved to be unsuitable as a ruler. Umar later moved southwards and founded a Fulani emirate in Kontagora. However, there were limitations to his power. When Bukhari, the Emir of Hadejia obtained power by force, Abdulkadir was charged to deal with the situation. He proceeded to Katagum and summoned Bukhari but the latter threatened him with his troops, Bukhari was declared a rebel and his brother, Ahmad was appointed Emir. Bukhari sought help from Bornu. But two expeditions, one led by Ahmad, Abdulkadir's brother and the second by Abdulkadir himself were unsuccessful, meanwhile, Bukhari later killed his brother and took charge of Hadejia.

Abdulkadir's role also included recommending the appointment of Emirs to the Sultan. During this period, presents presented to the vizier and also to the Sultan were regularized as taxes.
