= Atiku =

Atiku is a given name and surname. It may refer to:

== Given name ==
- Atiku Abubakar (born 1946), Nigerian politician and businessman, Vice President of Nigeria from 1999 to 2007
- Atikur Rahman Mallik, Bangladeshi film editor

== Middle name ==
- Abubakar Atiku Bagudu (born 1961), Nigerian politician and governor of Kebbi State, Nigeria

== Surname ==
- Abdur Rahman Atiku, Sultan of Sokoto from 1891 to 1902
- Abu Bakr Atiku (1782–1842), third Sultan of the Sokoto Caliphate, from October 1837 until November 1842
- Ahmadu Atiku (c. 1807–1866), also known as Ahmadu Zarruku, Sultan of Sokoto from 1859 to 1866
- Amina Titi Atiku-Abubakar, Nigerian politician and activist, one of the wives of Atiku Abubakr, a former vice president of the Federal Republic of Nigeria
- Jelili Atiku, Nigerian multimedia performance artist and sculptor
