= Abdur Rahman Atiku =

- Sarkin Musulmi (Commander of the Faithful)
- Reign: 1891 – 1902
- Predecessor: Umaru bin Ali
- Successor: Muhammadu Attahiru I
- Died: 1902
- House: Fodiawa

Abdur Rahman Atiku (Arabic: عبد الرحمن أتيكو), sometimes known as Abdu or Abd al-Rahman bin Atiku, was the Sultan of Sokoto from 1891 to 1902. He was born around 1827 and was Bunu of Sokoto during his early to middle years. In earlier vacancies, he had been a contender from the house of Atiku, but the house had been passed over three times since the death of Ahmadu Rufai in 1873. Abubakar Na Rabah, Mu'azu, and Umaru bin Ali subsequent Sultans after Rufai were from the house of Muhammed Bello.

His nickname 'Danyen kasko', meaning 'unbaked pot' in Hausa, came from a proverb, "Danyen kasko ba shi kai ruwa ban daki" (an unbaked pot does not carry water to the back of the house).

== Life ==
Following the death of Umaru bin Ali while he was on campaign in Kaura Namoda, an emergency meeting was called by the Waziri due to enemy armies being near. During the meeting, Abdur Rahman, the son of Abu Bakr Atiku was chosen as Sultan. He was a brother of both Ahmadu Atiku and Umar Nagwamatse and a nephew of Muhammed Bello. Before becoming Sultan, he held the title of Bunu in charge of the village of Dambiso, north of Wurno.

Abdur Rahman was unpopular during his reign and at the time the Sokoto empire was being pulled into the main currents of World events, his choice was calamitous. He seemed to have taken offense easily and was known to be harsh and uncompromising. His reign started with a poor handling of a dispute over a small town in Zamfara, a region in which Sokoto Sultans arbitrated. The dispute was between the chief (Sarkin) of Mafara and the Sarkin Burmi. When Abdur Rahman allocated a disputed town to Burmi, Sarkin Mafara rejected the arbitration and Abdur Rahman deposed him. The dispute led to an open revolt by the Chief of Mafara and the revolt led to other uprisings in some Zamfara towns such as Anka. Mafara lost in the revolt but the terms of surrender were stiff, all conquered lands to be returned and an indemnity of 1,000 slaves to be given up.

Abdur Rahman was also faced with the issue of the Kebbawa, before the start of his reign, Sokoto had mounted two unsuccessful expeditions against Argungu. To deal with the issue, he summoned Eastern emirs to bring half of their troops; though the Emirs of Katsina and Bauchi responded and also came in person, only Tukur, the son of the Emir of Kano and also the Galadima of Kano was interested in a victory. The expedition turned out to be disastrous, as the larger Sokoto army was overwhelmed by the enemy, and in the end, they were in flight being pursued by the Kebbi cavalry.

== Kano Civil War ==
Abdur Rahman's decision to appoint Tukur as Emir of Kano after the death of his father Muhammed Bello led to a Civil War in Kano. Upon the death of Bello, the major claimants to the throne were Yusuf from the branch of Abdullahi Maje Karofi in the house of Dabo and Tukur from the Bello branch. Yusuf's following in Kano was large and his family had hoped after the death of their Uncle, Muhammed Bello, it would be the turn of the Abdullahi clan to succeed to the throne. Yusuf was also the favorite of the Kano Emirate electors. However, against the wishes of his vizier and the Kano electors, Abdur Rahman appointed Tukur as Emir. Upon Tukur's appointment, Yusuf and his followers moved out of Kano. He decided to wage a revolt against Tukur and subsequently sought help from states such as Gumel, Ningi, and Damagaram. Yusuf and his followers then waged war on Kano. The first attack was unsuccessful and the rebels retreated southeast of Kano. During this period, Yusuf appointed Aliyu Babba as his successor, and he died before a new attack was launched. A second attack was launched by Aliyu Baba, Tukur's troops came out of the walled city in an open battle but were outnumbered. The city was overrun and it was then that Abdur Rahman sent help to aid Tukur in his flight from Kano and to re-organize but most of his requests to other emirs were met with a lukewarm attitude and Tukur was killed.. Sultan Abdurrahman died in March 1903, a few days after the Proclamation of Lord Lugard claiming Northern Nigeria, and as Sokoto was bracing for its fateful battle with British troops. He was 75 years old and was buried in Wurno, next to his uncle Sultan Muhammad Bello (r.1817-1837) and his cousin Aliyu Babba dan Bello (r.1842-1859).
