= Sokoto Central Mosque =

Mosque in Sokoto, Nigeria

The Sokoto Central Mosque, is the principal Friday mosque and a major center of Islamic learning in Sokoto, Nigeria. Founded in 1809 by Muhammadu Bello, the second Sultan of the Sokoto Caliphate, the mosque is located in the heart of the City of the Caliphate. The Sokoto Caliphate is Sunni Muslim. It is historically regarded as the first mosque built in the city and serves as the official seat for the Sultan of Sokoto's religious functions.

== History ==
The mosque was established in 1809 shortly after Muhammadu Bello founded Sokoto as a ribat and capital for the Caliphate. In 1815, after Usman dan Fodio relocated to the city, a second major mosque, Shehu's Mosque, was built nearby. While Masallacin Shehu became the spiritual headquarters for the Shehu's followers, the Sultan Bello Mosque remained the administrative and congregational center for the Sultanate.

By the mid-20th century, the original mud-brick structure began to suffer from structural instability. In 1962, under the patronage of Sir Ahmadu Bello (the Sardauna of Sokoto and Premier of Northern Nigeria), a massive reconstruction project was initiated to modernize the building.

Since this mosque is located near the tomb of Usman dan Fodio, the mosque serves as a major site for pilgrims.

== Architecture ==
The mosque has evolved through two distinct architectural phases:

- Vernacular phase (1809–1962) - the style was a Sudano-Sahelian style featuring thick mud walls and a flat roof supported by beams.
- Modern Islamic phase (1962–present) - this features a large central dome, flanking domes, and minarets. The interior includes marble cladding and ornate chandeliers.

The overall architecture is a blend of North African Islamic influence and local Hausa traditions.

== Religious significance ==
The Sultan of Sokoto utilises this mosque as his principle mosque for worship. In Sokoto, the Sokoto Central Mosque is a spiritual epicenter during Ramadan. The mosque hosts annual daily tafsir, delivered by the Chief Imam of Sokoto and attended by the Sultan. These sessions shaped West African Islamic discourse. Large-scale iftar programs occur which are also supported by the Sultan. During Ramadan, surrounding mosques will await the call of prayer from Sokoto's mosque prior to their prayer call.

== See also ==
- Islam in Nigeria
- Islam in Africa
