= Rijiyar Nagwamatse =

Coordinates: 10°24′N 5°28′E

Rijiyar Nagwamatse (means Well of Nagwamatse or Nagwamatse Well) is a 150 years tourist and historical place located 20 kilometers to Kontogora, Nigeria.

== History ==
The tourist contains water that was first scratched from the founder of traditional state Kontogora Emirate, Umaru Nagwamatse, the lying place of the well was the exact spot were Nagwamatse performed a miracle by scratching his right finger and water gushed from the earth, in a report from the people of the emirate says he usually perform Ablution for mid afternoon prayers known as salat Asri and according to the statements of the resident in the emirate told Daily Trust Newspaper that the water has never been below six feet under.

In a report from Independent Newspaper said that the legendary Nagwamatse during his Jihad to central region his resting place under a tree the warrior struck the ground with his sword at the time he wants to perform ablution for prayers and until now its exit. Nagwamatse is the fifth son of Sultan of Sokoto and the domain to the set up of Sarkin Sudan Kontogora Emirate together with his two sons Ibrahim Nagwanatse and Abubakar Modibo, he was a warrior and prince of Sokoto caliphs who came to rule in a far away from his founding fathers emirate now known as Kontogora of Niger State in a report from Abdullahi Musa said that the time he arrived at the emirate it was at noon of the day 1864 and today the (Well) remain a tourist and notable place of visit in Northern Region Nigeria.
