= Ahmadu Rufai =

Sultan of Sokoto, West Africa, 1867 to 1873

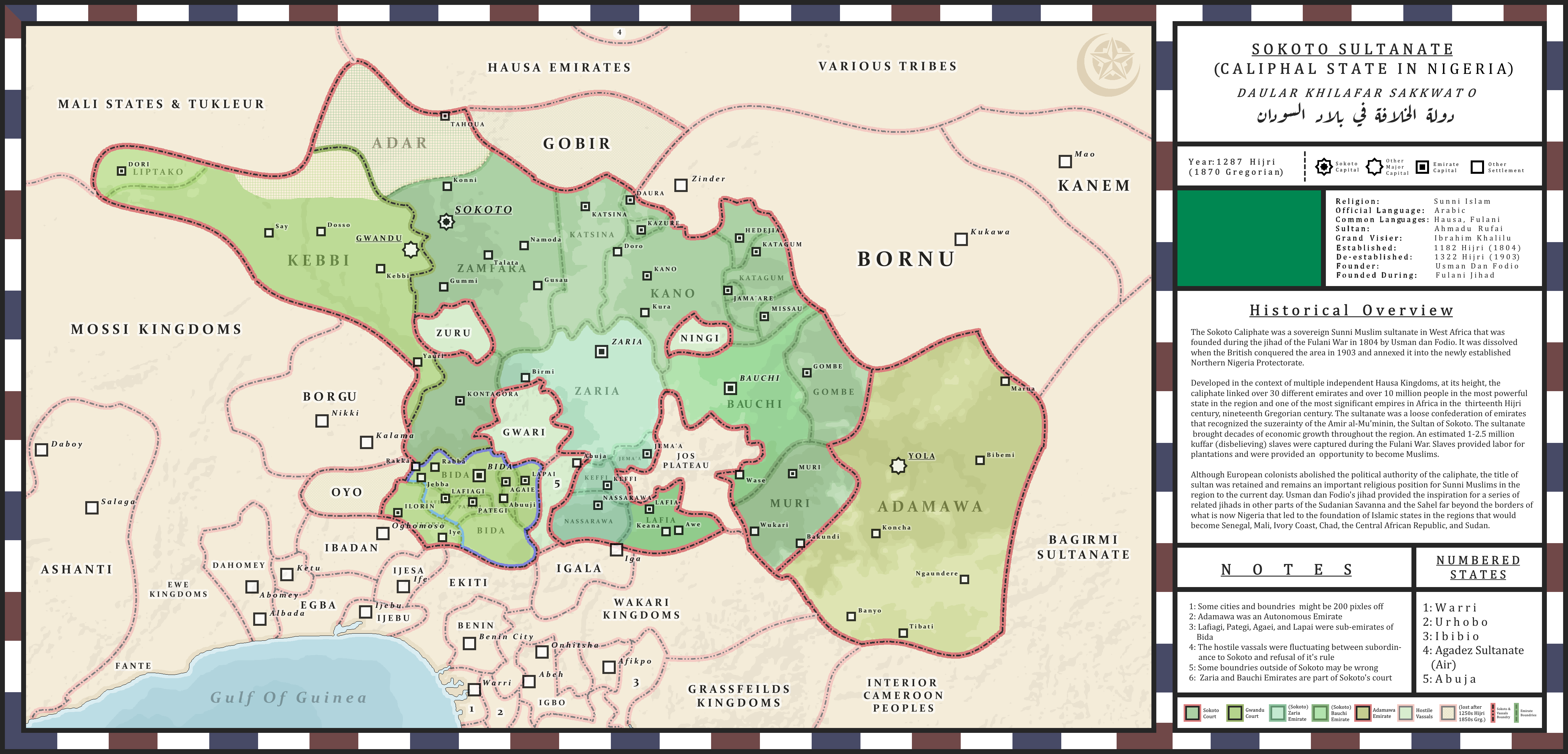
Sokoto Caliphate during the reign of sultan Ahmadu Rufai

Ahmadu Rufai (Arabic: أحمد رفاعي) was the Sultan of the Sokoto Caliphate, with his rule lasting from 1867 to 1873. He succeeded Ahmad Bello, who reigned for 11 months. Rufai's reign was distinguished for being uncharacteristically peaceful for the country, with his rule being considered a golden age in the history of the Sokoto Caliphate.

== Life ==
Rufai was a son of Uthman Dan Fodio. He spent most of his early life in a ribat at Silame on the frontiers of Argungu, an attack by the Kebbawa later drove him out of Silame but he stayed at the frontier in Tozo. He was likely selected Amir al-muminin as a compromise between the claims of the sons of Muhammed Bello and Abu Bakr Atiku. During his tenure, he made peace with the Kebbawa who were a thorn on the sides of the Fulani by arranging a truce with the Sultan of Argungu, Abdullahi Toga. The truce recognized the independence of Kebbi and their rights to own the remaining lands the Kebbawa had recovered. His reign was noted as being uneventful in terms of campaigns and battles, there were few expeditions and raids but Sokoto's prosperity did not depend on raids anymore as long as Emirs sent their presents and share of booty and tax.

The Sokoto Caliphate leaders are partly Arabs and partly Fulani as stated by Abdullahi dan Fodio, brother of Usman dan Fodio who claimed that their family are part Fulani, and part Arabs, they claimed to descent from the Arabs through Uqba ibn Nafi who was an Arab Muslim of the Umayyad branch of the Quraysh, and hence, a member of the family of the Prophet, Uqba ibn Nafi allegedly married a Fulani woman called Bajjumangbu through which the Torodbe family of Usman dan Fodio descended. Caliph Muhammed Bello writing in his book Infaq al-Mansur claimed descent from Prophet Muhammad through his paternal grandmother's lineage called Hawwa (mother of Usman dan Fodio), Alhaji Muhammadu Junaidu, Wazirin Sokoto, a scholar of Fulani history, restated the claims of Shaykh Abdullahi bin Fodio in respect of the Danfodio family been part Arabs and part Fulani, while Ahmadu Bello in his autobiography written after independence replicated Caliph's Muhammadu Bello claim of descent from the Arabs through Usman Danfodio's mother, the historical account indicates that the family of Shehu dan Fodio are partly Arabs and partly Fulani who culturally assimilated with the Hausas and can be described as Hausa-Fulani Arabs. Prior to the beginning of the 1804 Jihad the category Fulani was not important for the Torankawa (Torodbe), their literature reveals the ambivalence they had defining Torodbe-Fulani relationships. They adopted the language of the Fulbe and much ethos while maintaining a separate identity. The Toronkawa clan at first recruited members from all levels of Sūdānī society, particularly the poorer people. Toronkawa clerics included people whose origin was Fula, Wolof, Mande, Hausa and Berber. However, they spoke the Fula language, married into Fulbe families, and became the Fulbe scholarly caste.
