= Caliph Abu Bakr =

Caliph Abu Bakr may refer to:

- Abu Bakr al Siddiq of the Rashidun caliphate
- Abu Bakr Atiku of the Sokoto caliphate
- Abu Bakr al-Baghdadi of the Islamic State of Iraq and the Levant
