= Muhammadu Maiturare =

Muhammadu Maiturare محمد مايتوراري
- Sultan of Sokoto
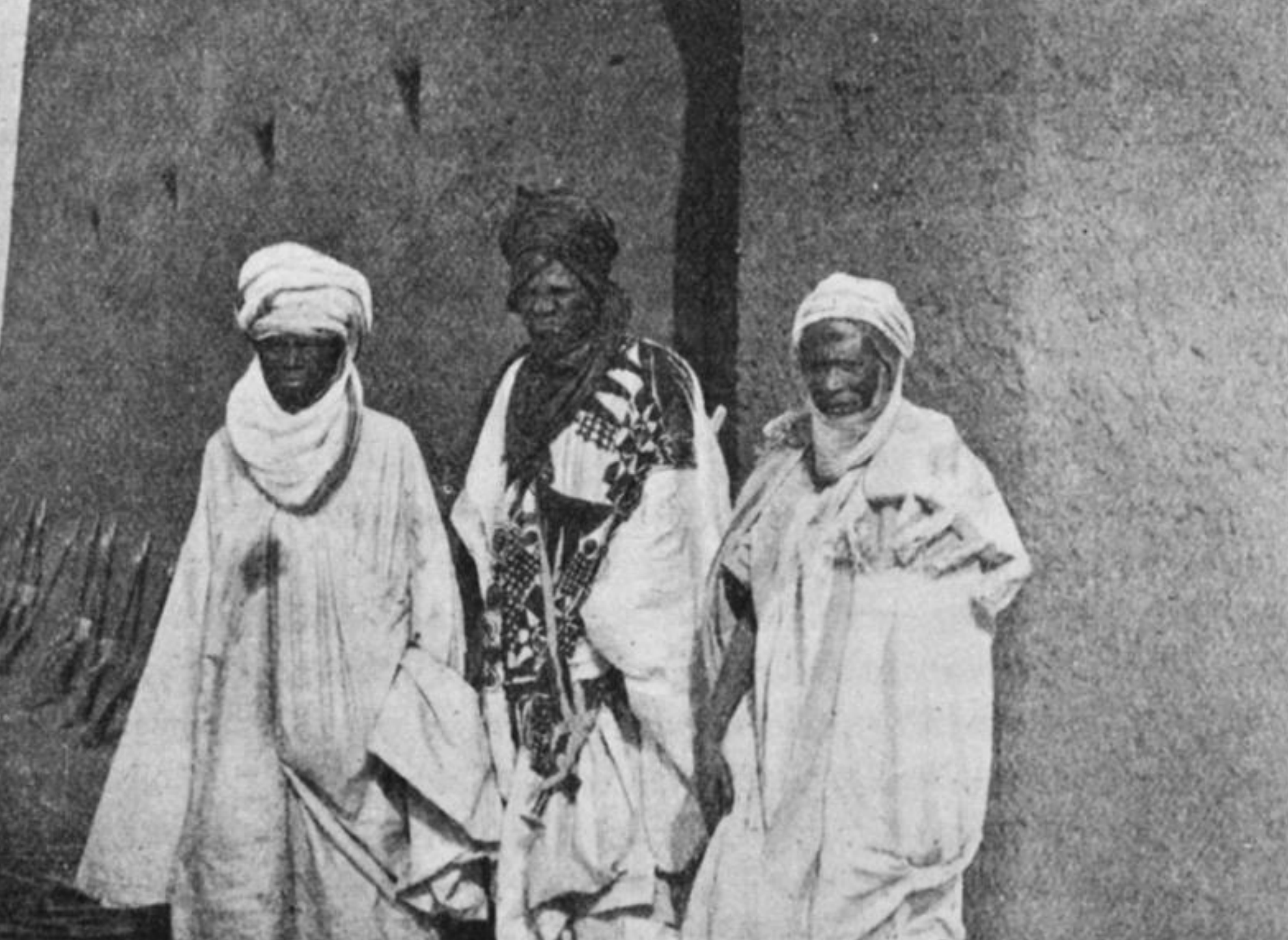
- Muhammadu Maiturare (middle) as a Sokoto prince in 1904
- Reign: 1915-1924
- Predecessor: Muhammadu Attahiru II
- Successor: Muhammadu Tambari
- Born: 1854
- Died: 1924 (aged 69–70); Sokoto
- House: Atiku
- Father: Ahmadu Atiku

Muhammadu Maiturare (Arabic: محمد مايتوراري) was Sultan of Sokoto from 1915 until his death in 1924. He was a grandson of Abu Bakr Atiku and son of Sultan Ahmadu Atiku. His mother was the daughter of a Tuareg chief.

== Life ==
Before becoming Sultan, Maiturare held the title of Marafa Gwadabawa and was a member of the traditional committee that elected Muhammadu Attahiru II, Lugard's choice for the post of Sultan. Maiturare was notable for developing the district of Gwadabawa in Sokoto. He was also noted as an effective military leader who pacified the area north of Sokoto which had been raided frequently by the Kebbawa. On June 19, 1915, Maiturare was elected by the Sokoto traditional council as the successor to Muhammadu Attahiru II. His selection was ratified by the Governor Lord Lugard five days later. The choice of Maiturare by the council was accepted by the British because he was a keen opponent of a Mahdist revolt in 1906, and led a force of 300 fighters against the Mahdist rebels in the village of Satiru. From 1915 to 1921, he enjoyed the support of British residents posted to Sokoto. In 1921, there was however a petition written to the Lieutenant Governor by the resident Edwardes. The petition was based on allegations of two Sokoto chiefs: Usman the Majidadi and Saidu Sintali. The allegations were proven false and Usman was removed from his position. He died in June 1924, aged 70, following a trip to Zaria.
