= Muhammadu Attahiru II =

Muhammadu Attahiru II محمد الطاهر الثاني
- Sultan of Sokoto
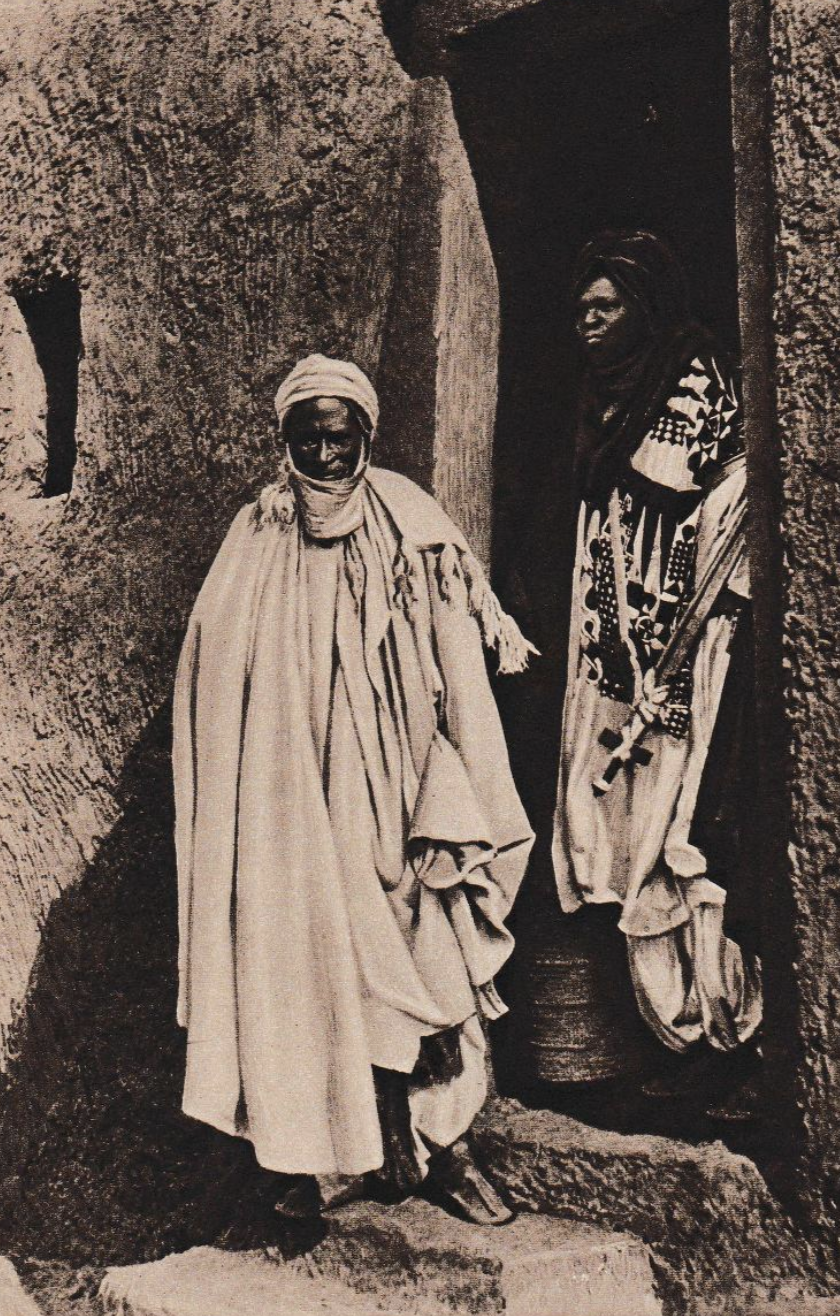
- Muhammadu Attahiru II (R) with his chief scribe
- Reign: March 21, 1903-1915
- Predecessor: Muhammadu Attahiru I
- Successor: Muhammadu Maiturare
- Died: 1915; Sokoto
- Father: Ali Babba bin Bello

Muhammadu Attahiru II (Arabic: محمد الطاهر الثاني) was the thirteenth Sultan of the Sokoto Caliphate from 1903 to 1915. Attahiru II was the great-grandson of Usman dan Fodio, the founder of the Sokoto Caliphate and son of Ali Babba bin Bello, the fourth Sultan. Upon the death of the eleventh sultan Abderrahman dan Abi Bakar in 1902, Attahiru II was the primary challenger to the candidacy of Muhammadu Attahiru I, with the later being selected as the Sultan. After losing this selection to Attahiru I, it is claimed that Attahiru II became largely uninterested in the affairs of the Caliphate.

In 1903, British forces conquered Sokoto leading Attahiru I to flee from the city with many supporters. British Commander Frederick Lugard appointed Muhammadu Attahiru II the new Sultan of Sokoto on March 21, 1903. However, at the same time Lugard stripped much of the political power of the office of Sultan.

Attahiru's reign consisted of balancing his need to both serve the people he ruled and satisfy the British colonial authorities. In 1906, a Mahdist rebellion broke out outside the city of Sokoto in the village of Satiru. Elements of the Royal West African Frontier Force were dispatched to suppress the rebellion; upon hearing news of what had transpired, Attahiru dispatched a mixed force of 300 Sokoto cavalry and infantry led by Mallam Isa to join them. The combined force successfully suppressed the rebellion, which marked the last instance of armed resistance to British rule in the region.

Preceded by Muhammadu Attahiru I	13th Sokoto Caliph; 1903–1915	Succeeded by Muhammadu Maiturare
