= Attahiru =

Attahiru may refer to:

- Attahiru Bafarawa (born 1954), governor of Sokoto State in Nigeria from 1999 to 2007
- Muhammadu Attahiru I (died 1903), Sultan of Sokoto from 1902 to 1903
- Muhammadu Attahiru II (died 1915), Sultan of Sokoto from 1903 to 1915
