= Muhammadu Tambari =

Sultan of Sokoto from 1924 to 1931

Muhmmadu Tambari reigned as Sultan of Sokoto from 1924 to 1931, he was deposed in 1931. Tambari was the son of Muhammadu Maiturare.

== Life ==
Prior to his selection as Sultan, Tambari was the Sarkin Gobir of Gwadabawa; his selection as Sultan was influenced by the Lieutenant Governor, William Gowers and Webster, the British resident in Sokoto. Tambari's major competitor was Hassan, Sarkin Barau of Dange who was eleven years older than Tambari and who was the preferred choice of the Sokoto traditional council led by Waziri Maccido. However, the masses were indifferent to the choice of Tambari over Hassan, Tambari's father was respected for his kindness and they hoped his son will be kind like his father. During his reign, he did not enjoy loyalty from many of his officials due to the lack of support for his candidacy by notable men in Sokoto but depended on the support of the British to go along with his duties. Tambari consolidated his hold by firing or asking disloyal officials to resign, the first major official to resign was Waziri Maccido who resigned in September 1925, some other officials dismissed were Usman the Magajin Garin of Sokoto, the chief Alkali and Usman the majidadi. He replaced Maccido with Abdulkadiri as acting Waziri, this was done despite the fact the new Waziri was not from the venerated Gidado line and despite the British resident's contemptuous attitude towards Abdulakdiri. However, three years later and on the advice of the British, he appointed Abbas as the new Waziri, Abbas had the support of notable family in Sokoto but he was not well liked by Tambari. Prominent among the children of Sultan Tambari was Sarkin Gobir Adiya.

=== Deposition ===
Up until July, 1930, Tambari's relationship with the British residents had been cordial, but in July 1930, allegations of miscarriage of justice, issuing usurious loans to district heads and consultation with African traditional religion practitioners was levied against him. Further, in October 1930, frivolous accusations were made against him by unknown persons. The allegations were investigated in late 1930 and Tambari deposed.
