= List of sultans of Sokoto =

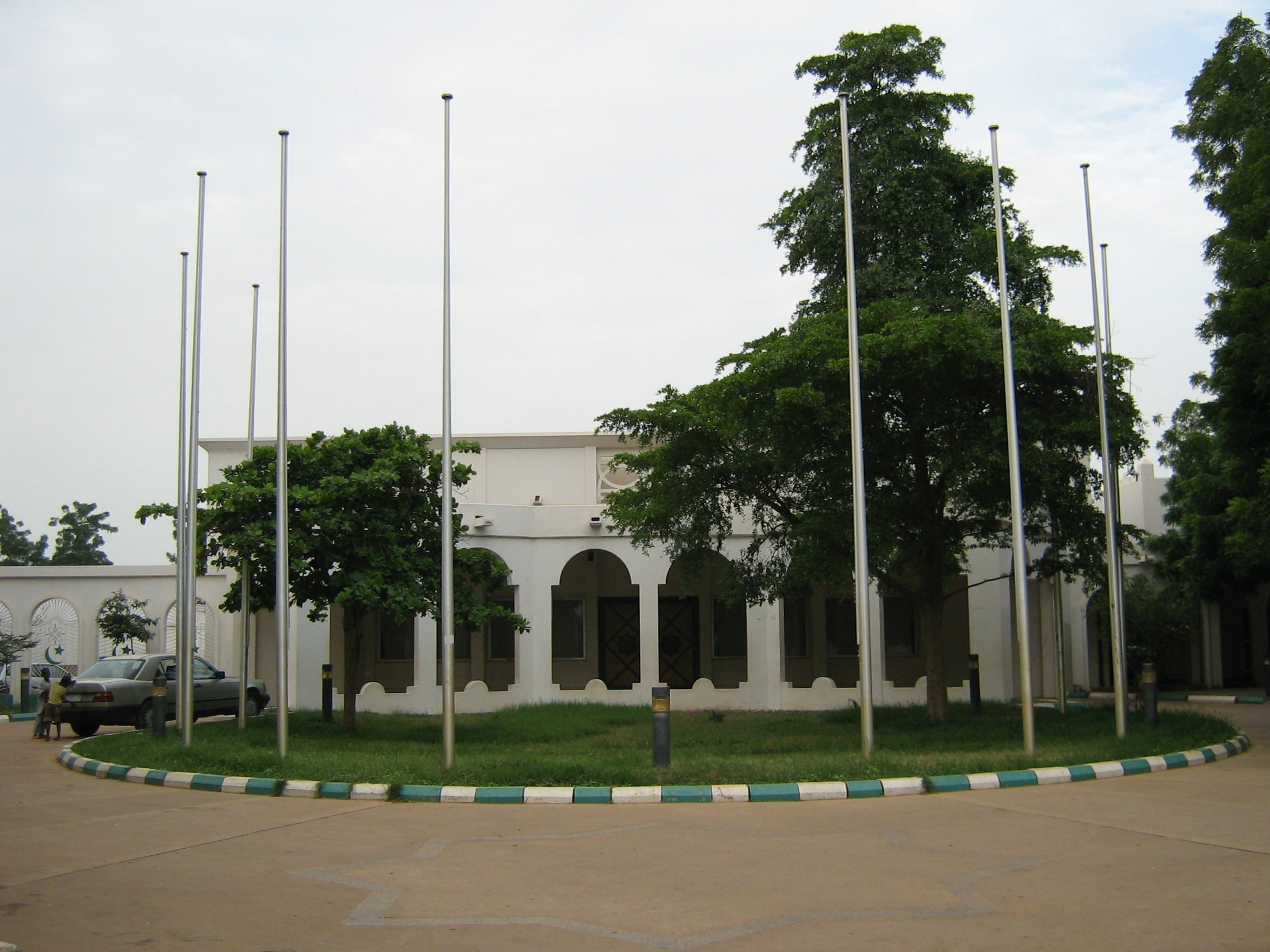
Entrance to the modern Sultan's palace in Sokoto

The sultan of Sokoto is the hereditary leader of the Sokoto Caliphate, a Sunni Muslim community in West Africa. The position may also be referred to as the 'Sokoto Caliph' or the "Commander of the Faithful" (Amir-ul-Momineen in Arabic or Lamido Julbe in Fulani). The current holder of this title, since 2006, is Sa'adu Abubakar. The sultan of Sokoto is the leader of the Qadiriyya Sufi order, historically the most important Muslim position in Nigeria and senior to the Emir of Kano, the leader of the Tijaniyya Sufi order. The post has become increasingly ceremonial since British rule defeated the caliphate and replaced it with the Sokoto Sultanate Council in 1903, but the sultan – considered a spiritual leader in the Muslim community in Nigeria – can still carry much weight with Fulani and Hausa people from northern Nigeria.

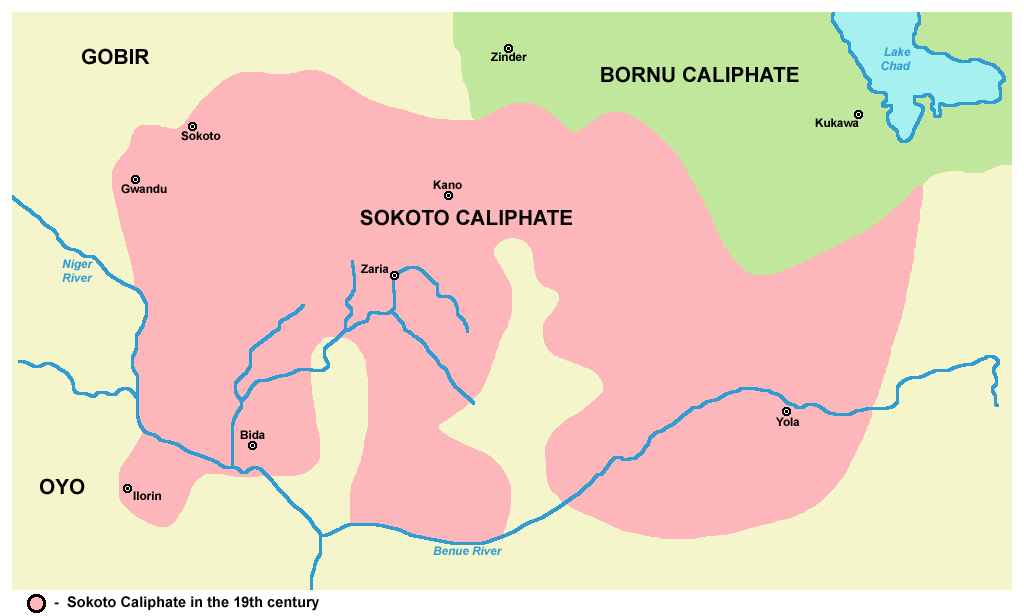
Sokoto Caliphate in the 19th century

Usman dan Fodio, the founder of the dynasty of Sokoto State and of the Fulani Empire (consisting of the Fulbe Jihad states of which Sokoto was suzerain), never used the high style of Sultan but was simply titled Amir al-Mu´minin . The first to assume the title of Sultan was Fodio's son Muhammed Bello, who ruled from 1817 to 1837. Since the creation of the title, there have been nineteen Sultans of Sokoto, all men from the Torodbe scholar caste who are descended from Usman dan Fodio. Siddiq Abubakar III was the longest serving Sultan, holding the position for 50 years from 1938 to 1988. The shortest reign was that of Muhammadu Attahiru I, who held the position for five months in 1902–03. The 17th sultan, Ibrahim Dasuki, was forcefully deposed in 1996 by the Sani Abacha military government of Nigeria.

Prior to the beginning of the Fulani Jihad of 1804, the ethnic category Fulani was not important for the Torodbe and their literature reveals the ambivalence they had defining Torodbe-Fulani relationships. They adopted the language of the Fulani and much ethos while maintaining a separate, non-ethnic identity. The Torodbe clan at first recruited members from all levels of Sūdānī society, particularly the poorer people.

== List of sultans ==
Sultan of Sokoto
- Flag of the Sokoto Caliphate

Incumbent
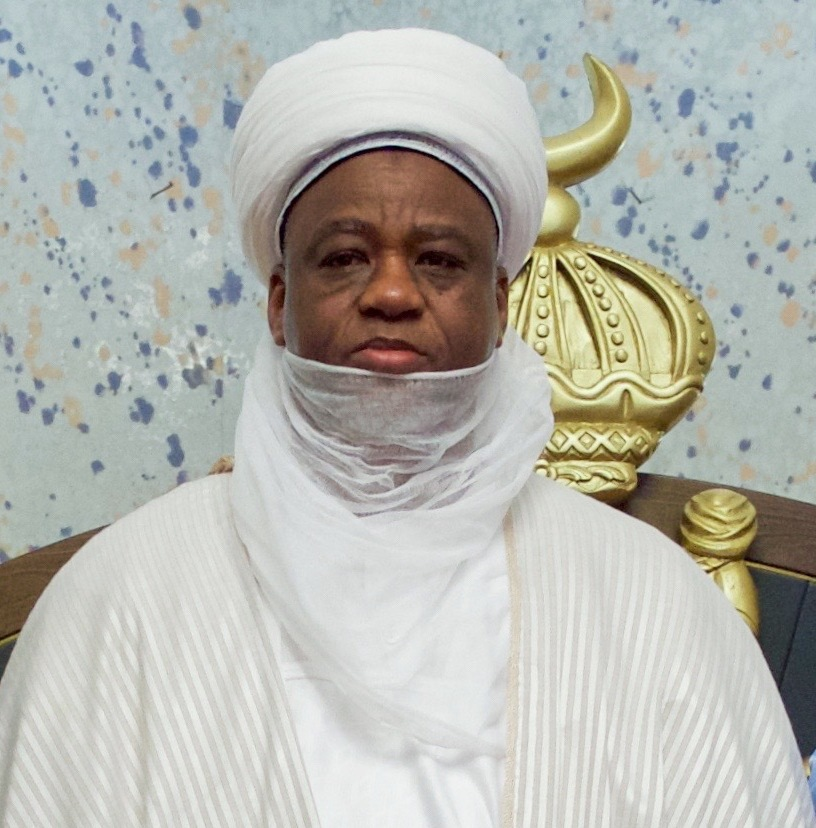
- Abubakar IV since 2 November 2006

Details
- Style: His Eminence; His Highness; His Excellency
- First monarch: Muhammed Bello 1817–1837
- Formed: 1807
- Residence: Wuro Bello
- Appointer: Sokoto Sultanate Council with approval from the Sokoto State Government

As mentioned above, the sultans were also styled Amir al-Mu´minin and Sarkin Musulmi ("King of the Muslims"), basically the autochthonous form of the former, which is the Arabic style of caliphs and other independent sovereign Muslim rulers that claim legitimacy from a community of Muslims); Mai, occurring in various sultans' surnames, is another autochthonous title. The table below shows the historical list of the sultan of Sokoto, beginning from 1817.

No.	Image	Name	Birth and death	Reign started	Reign ended	Lineage	House
1		Muhammed Bello (محمد بلُّو)	1781; Unknown – 1837; Wurno (aged 58)	21 April 1817	25 October 1837	Son of Usman dan Fodio	House of Bello
2		Abubakar I Atiku (أبو بكر عتيكو)	1782; Unknown – 1842; Sokoto (aged 60)	26 October 1837	23 November 1842	Son of Usman dan Fodio	House of Atiku
3		Ali Babba bin Bello (علي ببَّا بن بلُّو)	1808; Sala – 1859; Sokoto (aged 51)	30 November 1842	21 October 1859	Son of Muhammed Bello	House of Bello
4		Ahmadu Atiku (أحمد عتيكو)	c. 1807; Unknown – 1866; Sokoto (aged ~59)	24 October 1859	2 November 1866	Son of Abu Bakr Atiku	House of Atiku
5		Aliyu Karami	1808 Sala – 1867 Wurno (aged 59)	6 November 1866	18 October 1867	Son of Muhammed Bello	House of Bello
6		Ahmadu Rufai	1814 – 1867 Wurno (aged 53)	21 October 1867	12 March 1873	Son of Usman dan Fodio	House of Rufai
7		Abubakar II Atiku na Raba	1812 – 1877 (aged 65)	16 March 1873	28 March 1877	Son of Muhammed Bello	House of Bello
8		Mu'azu	1816 – 1881 (aged 65)	6 April 1877	26 September 1881	Son of Muhammed Bello	House of Bello
9		Umaru bin Ali	c. 1824; Sokoto – 1891; Kaura Namoda (aged ~67)	3 October 1881	25 March 1891	Son of Ali Babba bin Bello	House of Bello
10		Abd al-Rahman bin Atiku	c. 1828; Unknown – 1902; Unknown (aged ~74)	25 March 1891	10 October 1902	Son of Abu Bakr I Atiku	House of Atiku
11		Muhammadu Attahiru I	Unknown – 1903 Mbormi	13 October 1902	15 March 1903	Son of Ahmadu Atiku	House of Atiku
12		Muhammadu Attahiru II		21 March 1903	1915	Son of Ali Babba bin Bello	House of Bello
13		Muhammadu dan Ahmadu	1854 — 1924 (aged 69–70) Sokoto	1915	1924	Son of Ahmadu Atiku	House of Atiku
14		Muhammadu dan Muhammadu		1924	1931	Son of Muhammadu dan Ahmadu	House of Atiku
15		Hasan dan Mu'azu Ahmadu		1931	1938	Son of Mu'azu	House of Bello
16		Siddiq Abubakar III	15 March 1903; Dange – 1 November 1988; Sokoto (aged 85)	1938	1988	Grandson of Mu'azu	House of Bello
17		Ibrahim Dasuki	23 December 1923; Dogondaji - 14 November 2016; Abuja (aged 93)	6 November 1988	20 April 1996 (deposed)	Great-great-grandson of Usman dan Fodio	House of Buhari
18		Muhammadu Maccido	20 April 1926; Dange Shuni – 29 October 2006 (near Abuja) (aged 80)	20 April 1996	29 October 2006	Son of Siddiq Abubakar III	House of Bello
19		Sa'adu Abubakar	24 August 1956; Sokoto –	2 November 2006	Current	Son of Siddiq Abubakar III	House of Bello

== Genealogical tree of the sultans of Sokoto ==
Mallam; Muhammadu; Fodio
1 Usman dan Fodio; 1804–1815	Abdullahi dan Fodio; Emir of Gwandu
2 Muhammed; Bello; 1817–1837	3 Abubakar I Atiku; 1837–1842	6 Ahmadu; Rufai; 1867–1873	Muhammed; Buhari; Emir of Tambawel
4 Ali Babba bin Bello; 1842–1859	7 Aliu; Karami; 1866–1867	8 Abubakar II; Atiku na Raba; 1873–1877	9 Mu'azu; Ahmadu; 1877–1881	Umaru Nagwamatse; Emir of Kontagora	5 Ahmadu; Atiku; 1859–1866	11; Abder Rahman; Atiku; 1891–1902	Abdullahi; Barau; Sarkin Yamma
10; Umaru bin Ali; 1881–1891	13; Muhammadu; Attahiru II; 1903–1915	16; Hasan dan Mu'azu Ahmadu; 1931–1938	Usman; Shehu	12; Muhammadu; Attahiru I 1902–1903	14; Muhammadu; Maiturare; 1915–1924	Haliru; Ibn Barau; Sarkin Yamma
17; Siddiq; Abubakar III; 1938–1988	15; Muhammadu; Tambari; 1924–1931	18; Ibrahim; Dasuki; 1988–1996
19; Muhammadu; Maccido; 1996–2006	20; Sa'adu; Abubakar; 2006–

== Gallery ==
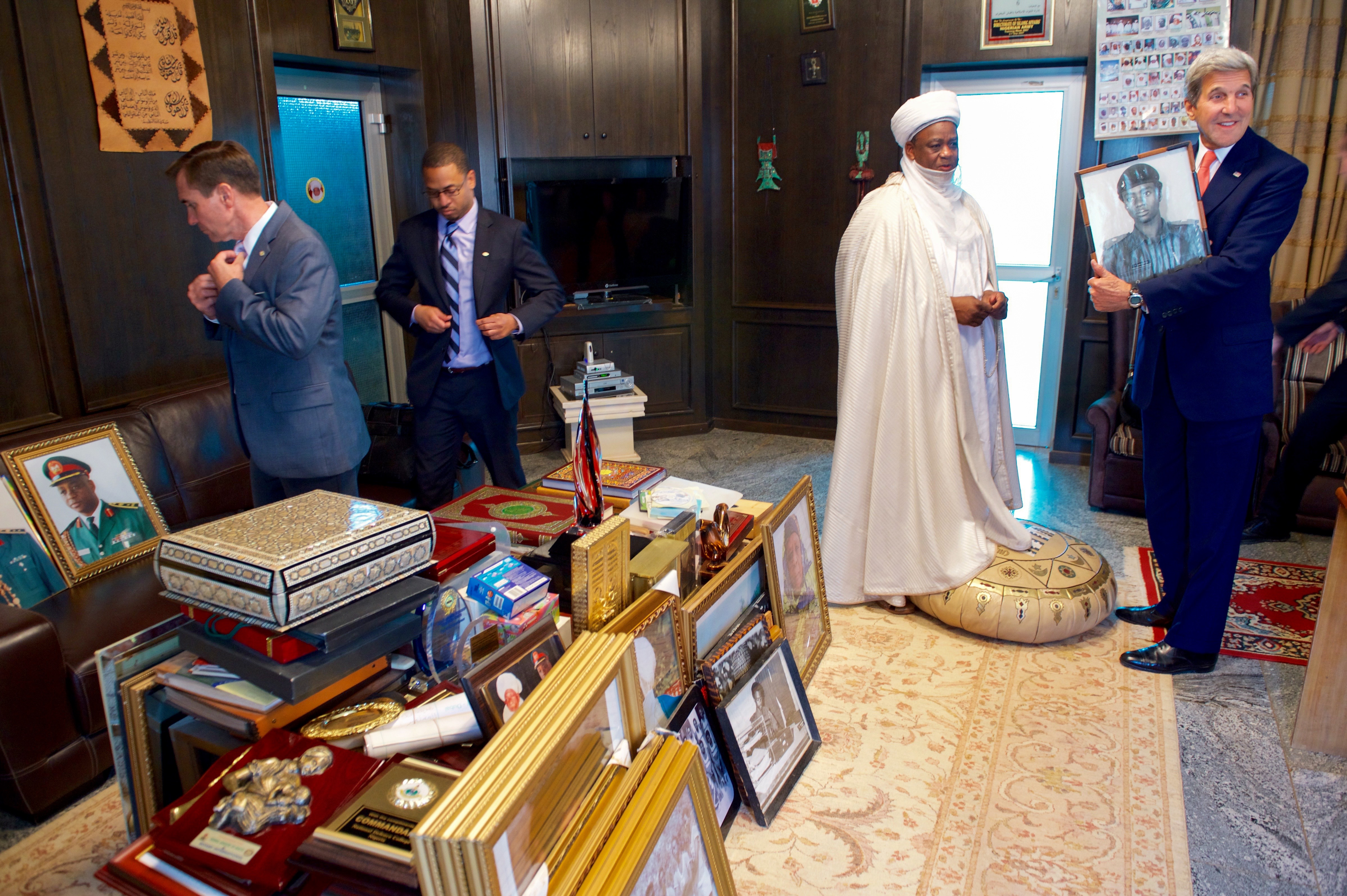
US Secretary John Kerry Visits With Sultan Muhammadu Sa’ad Abubakar Prior To Delivering a Speech in Sokoto

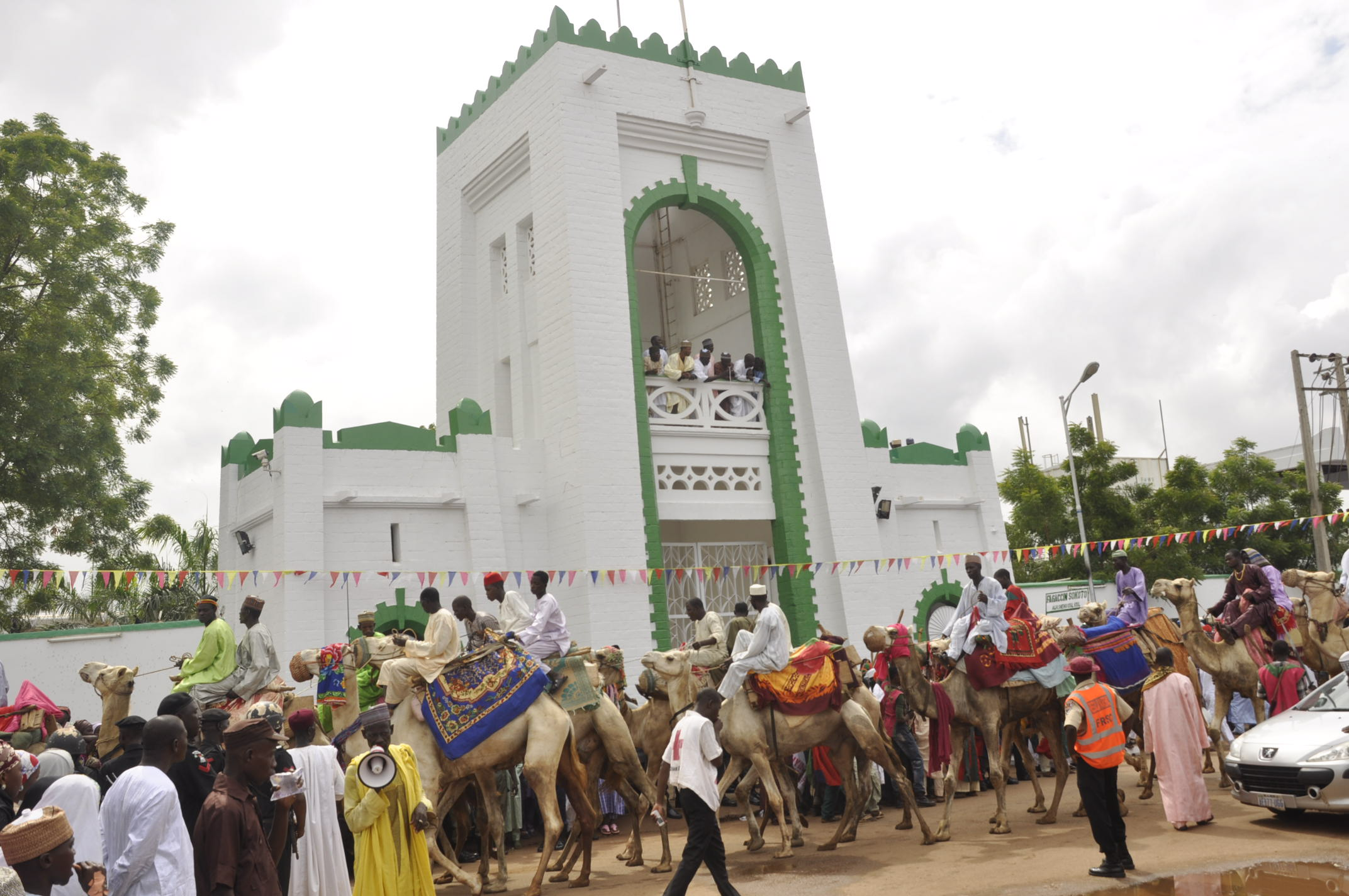
Gate to the Palace of the Sultan

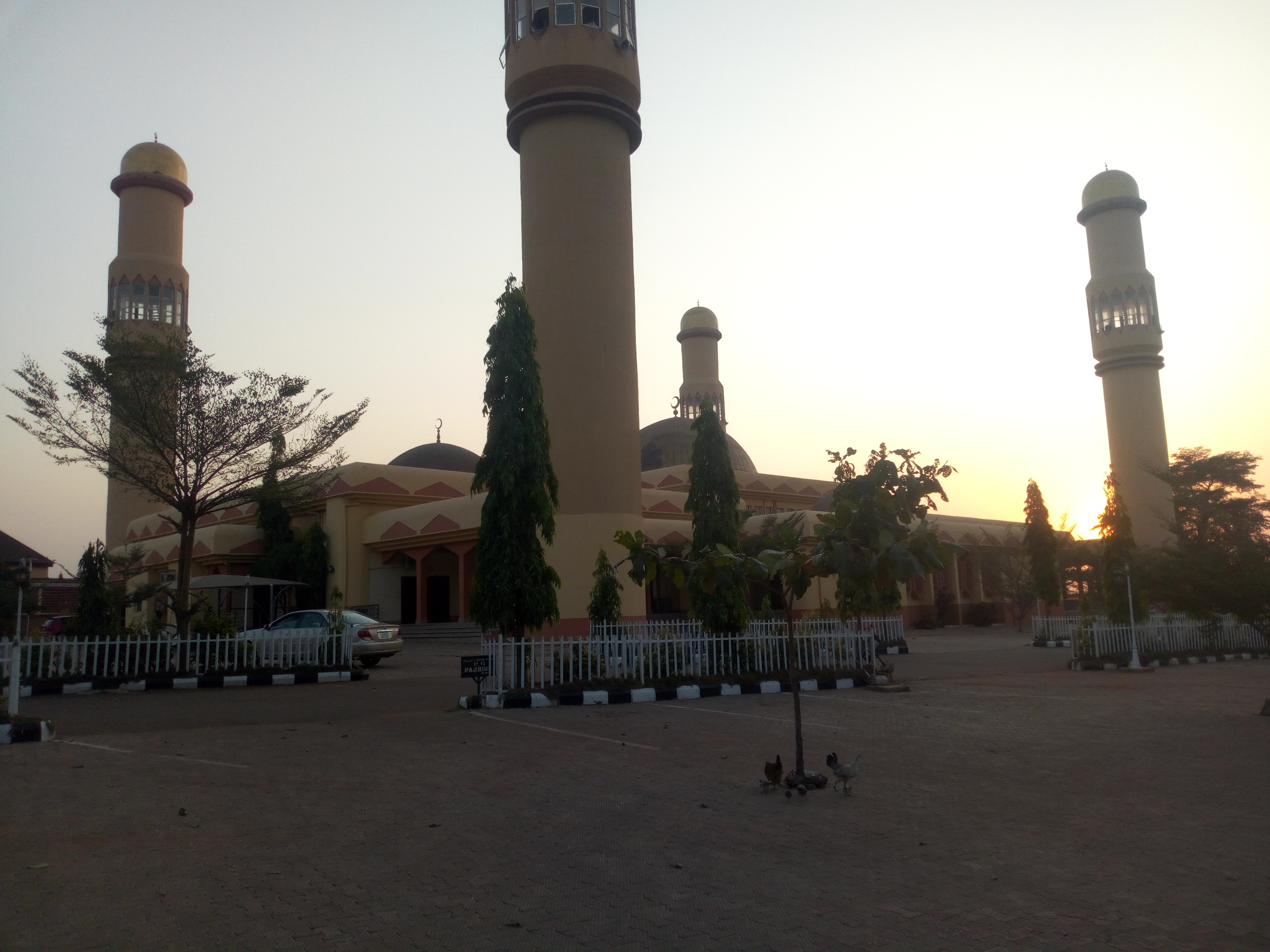
Mosque of Sultan Muhammad Bello

== Sources and references ==
- Falola, Toyin, (2009) Historical Dictionary of Nigeria Scarecrow Press: Lanham, Maryland
- Burdon, J. A. (1907) "Sokoto History: Tables of Dates and Genealogy" Journal of the Royal African Society Volume 6, #24.

== See also ==
- Grand Viziers of Sokoto
