= Mu'azu =

Sultan of Sokoto, West Africa, 1877 to 1881

- Sarkin Musulmi (Commander of the Faithful)
- Reign: 6 April 1877 – 26 September 1881
- Predecessor: Abubakar II Atiku na Raba
- Successor: Umaru bin Ali
- Died: 26 September 1881
- House: House of Bello

Muazu was Sultan of Sokoto from 6 April 1877 to 26 September 1881. He was the son of Sultan Muhammed Bello and his wife, Aisha bin Umar al-Kammu.

== Life ==
Muazu lived in Sokoto town before his election and was the first Sultan not to command a ribat on the frontier. He was picked as Sultan over his brother Sa'id based on his seniority. During his reign, he faced a hostile Sabon Birni which Bawa, the emir of Gobir and previous Sultans had subdued, he concentrated on retaking the town but was unsuccessful.
