= Umaru Nagwamatse =

1st Emir of Kontagora from 1859 to 1876

- Sarkin Sudan Kontagora

Emir of Kontagora
- Reign: 1859 – 1876
- Predecessor: position established
- Successor: Abubakar Modibbo
- Born: Umar bin Abu Bakr Atiku; 1806
- Died: 1876 (aged 69–70); Kontagora
- Burial: 1876; Mamba, Nasko
- Issue: Abubakar Modibbo; Ibrahim Nagwamatse
- House of: Atiku
- Father: Abu Bakr Atiku

Umaru Nagwamatse (Arabic: عمر بن أبو بكر أتيكو, romanized: ʿUmar bin ʾAbū Bakr ʾAtiku; c.1806 – 1876) was the founder and the first ruler (Sarkin Sudan) of the Kontagora Emirate. He was the grandson of Usman dan Fodio and the son of the second sultan of the Sokoto Caliphate, Sultan Abu Bakr Atiku.

== Life ==
Umaru Nagwamatse was born in 1806. He was the 10th son of Abu Bakr Atiku, the second Caliph of Sokoto (r. 1837–1842) and a son of Usman dan Fodio.

=== As a murabitun ===
While still a young man, Nagwamatse was appointed as the administrator of the ribat (garrison town) of Gwamatse, a settlement in the Rima Valley, about a day's march from the city of Sokoto. However, during the reign of Caliph Aliyu Babba (r. 1842–1859), he was deposed for 'overreaching himself' and recalled to Sokoto. The Sarkin Zamfara Ahmadu Zaruku, his elder brother, went to Gwamatse with an army and ordered him out. His early association with the ribat earned him the nickname 'Umaru na Gwamatse' ('Umaru of Gwamatse').

Caliph Aliyu later appointed Nagwamatse as the commander of Katuru, another ribat located in the eastern part of Sokoto. At the time, Katuru was one of the fortresses in the upper Rima Valley, used by Sokoto in efforts to suppress the ongoing Gobir revolts against the Caliphate. Hence, this new position was of greater significance than his previous post at Gwamatse. Nagwamatse quickly amassed a large following at Katuru. According to British historian H.A.S. Johnston, this made his older brother Ahmadu Zaruku jealous, as he feared being replaced as heir apparent to the Sokoto rulership. Consequently, Nagwamatse was again deposed and recalled to Sokoto. According to Sokoto tradition, the robes he wore upon his return to Sokoto were so "gaudy and sumptuous" that they were confiscated and destroyed as punishment.

Nagwamatse was later sent to Talata Mafara, the most populous and important Hausa town in the Zamfara region of Sokoto. Unlike his other posts, his role at Talata Mafara was to keep an eye on the Sarkin Mafara, Agwaregi, who was the town's ruler and a vassal to the Sokoto Caliph. Caliph Aliyu suspected Agwaregi of disloyalty and wanted to prevent a revolt in the town. However, in 1851, Nagwamatse was recalled to Sokoto once again due to his increasing influence and power.

=== Soldier of fortune ===
Convinced he could not make any advancements in Sokoto, Nagwamatse travelled to the Caliphate's southern frontier to seek his fortune. He joined Makama Dogo, a mercenary who later founded the Nassarawa Emirate. At that time, Makama Dogo was leading a campaign in the Lower Benue Valley against the Igbirra Kingdom of Panda on behalf of the Emir of Zaria. For about two years, Nagwamatse served as a captain under Makama Dogo and helped him capture the important town of Toto.

In 1857, Nagwamatse left Makama Dogo's army and headed to Nupeland. He arrived in the Bida Emirate sometime after the suppression of Umar Bahaushe's insurrection. Umar Bahaushe, another soldier of fortune, had forced the Emir of Bida to flee the emirate and ruled Bida for several years. After he was killed, his troops remained without a leader until the arrival of Nagwamatse, who recruited many of them into his own army.

Nagwamatse quickly earned the trust of the Emir of Bida, Usuman Zaki, and his powerful brother Masaba. He joined them in expeditions against the Gbagyi settlements in the south. After Zaki's death in 1859, Masaba succeeded him as Emir. Although Masaba was still on good terms with Nagwamatse, he likely feared his growing influence in Bida. He encouraged him to carve out his own emirate in north, the no-man's-land lying between Yauri, Sokoto, Zaria, and Nupeland. Initially, he allowed Nagwamatse to set up a war camp in Bogi (near Wushishi), but later granted him free rein north of the River Kurmin Kada.

=== Emir of Kontagora ===
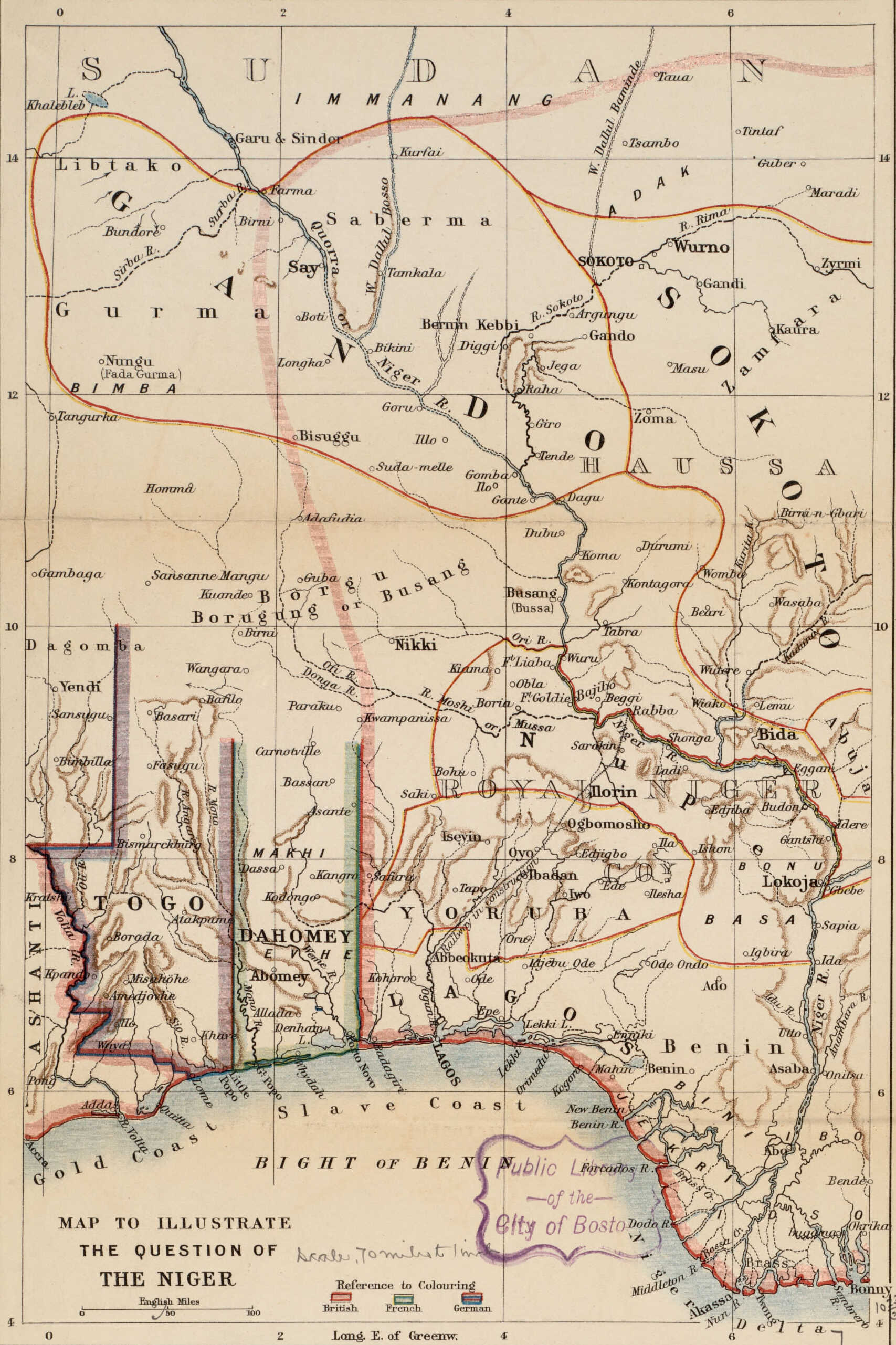
An 1898 Map showing territories controlled by Gwandu and Sokoto, including Kontagora

The territory Nagwamatse now set his sights on was vast—at least ten thousand square miles—and inhabited by many pagan tribes. The dense forests and the prevalence of tsetse flies allowed these peoples to fiercely resist subjugation by the more powerful surrounding states, particularly the Sokoto Caliphate, which relied heavily on cavalry warfare. However, this did not deter Nagwamatse and his army of mercenaries, who were hoping for booty and slaves.

Nagwamatse began his campaign with the Gbagyi settlements in the east. Despite receiving assistance from the Hausa Emirate of Abuja, the Gbagyi were ultimately defeated by Nagwamatse, who conquered the southern and western parts of their territory. Since he had not sought permission from the Caliph or the Emir of Gwandu, under whose jurisdiction the territory fell, Nagwamatse was condemned by Caliph Aliyu. However, Aliyu died shortly afterward and was succeeded by Ahmadu Zaruku. Nagwamatse was able to pacify his older brother and even secured recognition as a paramount ruler in his own right. Caliph Ahmadu gave his brother the title of Sarkin Sudan ('King of the Blacks'), a title commonly given to the princes of the House of Atiku.

In 1863, the Gbagyi rose against Nagwamatse but were subdued after a year of fighting. Having secured his position in the east, Nagwamatse turned his attention to the west, which was under the Yauri Emirate, a vassal state of the Gwandu Emirate. Since 1844, Yauri had been embroiled in a violent dynastic conflict. The current Emir, Yakuba, had ruled the Emirate since the death of his father, Jibrilu Gajere, who had seized the throne by killing the previous Emir, Abubakar Jatau. Yakuba was an unpopular ruler, and most of his subjects favored his cousin Suleimanu, continuing the civil strife.

Nagwamatse supported Yakubu in the conflict, and under that pretext, managed to capture what had been eastern Yauri, extending his control up to the Molendo River. As a result, Suleimanu was forced to retreat to the islands on the Niger River. He then sought assistance from the Emir of Gwandu but was ignored. The Emir was preoccupied with suppressing a fierce rebellion in Kebbi and likely did not want to involve himself in another conflict, especially against the younger brother and vassal of the Caliph of Sokoto.

However, in 1866, Ahmadu Zaruku died, and the Kebbi war ended the following year. This allowed the Emir to issue a stern warning to Nagwamatse, cautioning him against further encroachment into his territory. Unfortunately, the warning came too late, and the Emir had to concede that eastern Yauri had been lost to Nagwamatse.

Having established his authority in both the west and east, Nagwamatse built a capital at Kontagora in the centre of his territory in 1864. He continued enlarging his emirate by conquests of Kamuku, Kamberi, Dakarki (Dakarawa), Dukawa, Nupe, and Gbagyi towns and captured many slaves. He died at his capital in 1876.

== Legacy ==
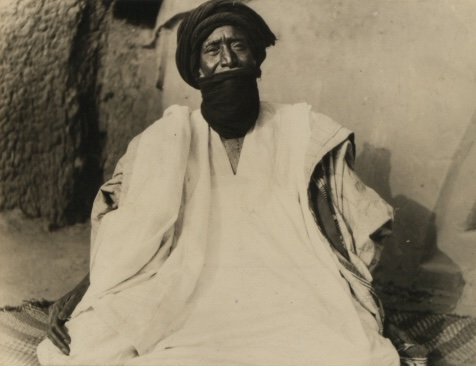
Nagwamatse's son, Ibrahim, the 3rd Emir of Kontagora. He was notorious for his slave-raids in the late 19th-century

Umaru Nagwamatse is remembered as a successful, independent and somewhat high-living prince at Sokoto. Throughout the remainder of the 19th century, he and his successors ruled as robber barons. Kontagora grew too powerful for the central authority at Sokoto to effectively discipline. While they continued to owe nominal allegiance to the Caliph, they ravaged Gbagyiland and southern Zaria through relentless slave raids, targeting both Muslims and non-Muslims alike.

=== Fort Nagwamatse ===
Fort Nagwamatse is an army barracks located in Kontagora, Niger State, owned by the Nigerian Army and named in honor of Nagwamatse.

=== Rijiyar Nagwamatse ===
Rijiyar Nagwamatse ('Nagwamatse's well'), located in Tadali village near Kontagora, has been a source of water for over 150 years. According to legend, Nagwamatse scratched the ground with his right hand, causing water to miraculously gush forth, allowing his army to perform ablution for the late afternoon prayer after an expedition. The local villagers, who had long struggled with a lack of drinking water, later dug a well to preserve the water at the site. The well is now a tourist attraction.
