= Uqba ibn Amr =

Companion of the Prophet

Uqba ibn Amr عقبة بن عمرو

Governor of Kufa
- In office 656–661
- Caliph: Ali
- Preceded by: Abu Musa al-Ash'ari
- Succeeded by: Al-Mughira ibn Shu'ba

Personal details
- Born: Medina, Arabia
- Spouse(s): Huzaila bint Thabit; Bashira bint Qudama
- Children: Bashir; Masoud; Umm Bashir; Umm al-Walid; Umm Ghaziya; Ghaziya (by a concubine)
- Parent(s): Amr ibn Tha'laba; Salama bint Azib
- Relatives: Hasan ibn Ali (son-in-law)

Uqba ibn Amr al-Ansari (Arabic: عقبة بن عمرو الأنصاري, romanized: ʿUqba ibn ʿAmr al-Anṣārī), also known by his kunya Abu Mas'ud was a companion of Muhammad and a prominent narrator of hadith. A member of the Ansar from the Banu Khazraj, he was among those who participated in the Pledge of al-Aqabah and later participated in the Battle of Uhud and other campaigns. His participation in the Battle of Badr is disputed, although al-Bukhari included him among the companions of Badr. Following the death of Uthman in 656, Uqba was among the earliest to pledge allegiance to Ali and was subsequently appointed by him as governor of Kufa.

== Life ==
Uqba belonged to Medina and was a member of the Banu Khazraj of the Ansar. He was among those present at the Pledge of al-Aqabah, where he pledged to protect Muhammad at the cost of his life. He was known by the kunya Abū Masʿūd al-Badrī. Most accounts state that he participated in the Battle of Badr, although Ibn Ishaq disputed his presence there; he is also reported to have participated in the Battle of Uhud.

Uqba opposed the Kufan revolt against Uthman (r. 644–656), the third caliph of the Rashidun Caliphate. Following Uthman's death, Uqba was among the earliest to pledge allegiance to Ali (r. 656–661). Ali subsequently appointed Uqba as the governor of Kufa. Afterward, Uqba married his daughter Umm Bashir to Ali's son Hasan. The modern historian Wilferd Madelung suggests that Ali was hoping to strength his relations with Uqba. Hasan and Umm Bashir had two (or possibly three) children with Umm Bashir, with their eldest son Zayd, his daughter Umm al-Husayn. It is also held that the couple had another daughter named Umm al-Hasan.

== Bibliography ==
- Madelung, Wilferd (1997). The Succession to Muhammad: A Study of the Early Caliphate. Cambridge University Press. ISBN 978-0-52-164696-3.
- Landau-Tasseron, Ella, ed. (1998). The History of al-Ṭabarī, Volume XXXIX: Biographies of the Prophet's Companions and their Successors: al-Ṭabarī's Supplement to his History. SUNY Series in Near Eastern Studies. Albany, New York: State University of New York Press. ISBN 978-0-7914-2819-1.
- Gordon, Matthew S.; Robinson, Chase F.; Rowson, Everett K.; Fishbein, Michael, eds. (2018). The Works of Ibn Wāḍiḥ al-Yaʿqūbī: An English Translation. Vol. 3. Brill. ISBN 978-90-04-36416-5.
- Norris, Harry T. (2020). Arabic Historical Literature from Ghadāmis and Mali: Documents from the 18th to 20th Century. Brill. ISBN 978-90-04-31585-3.
