= Muhammadu Junaidu =

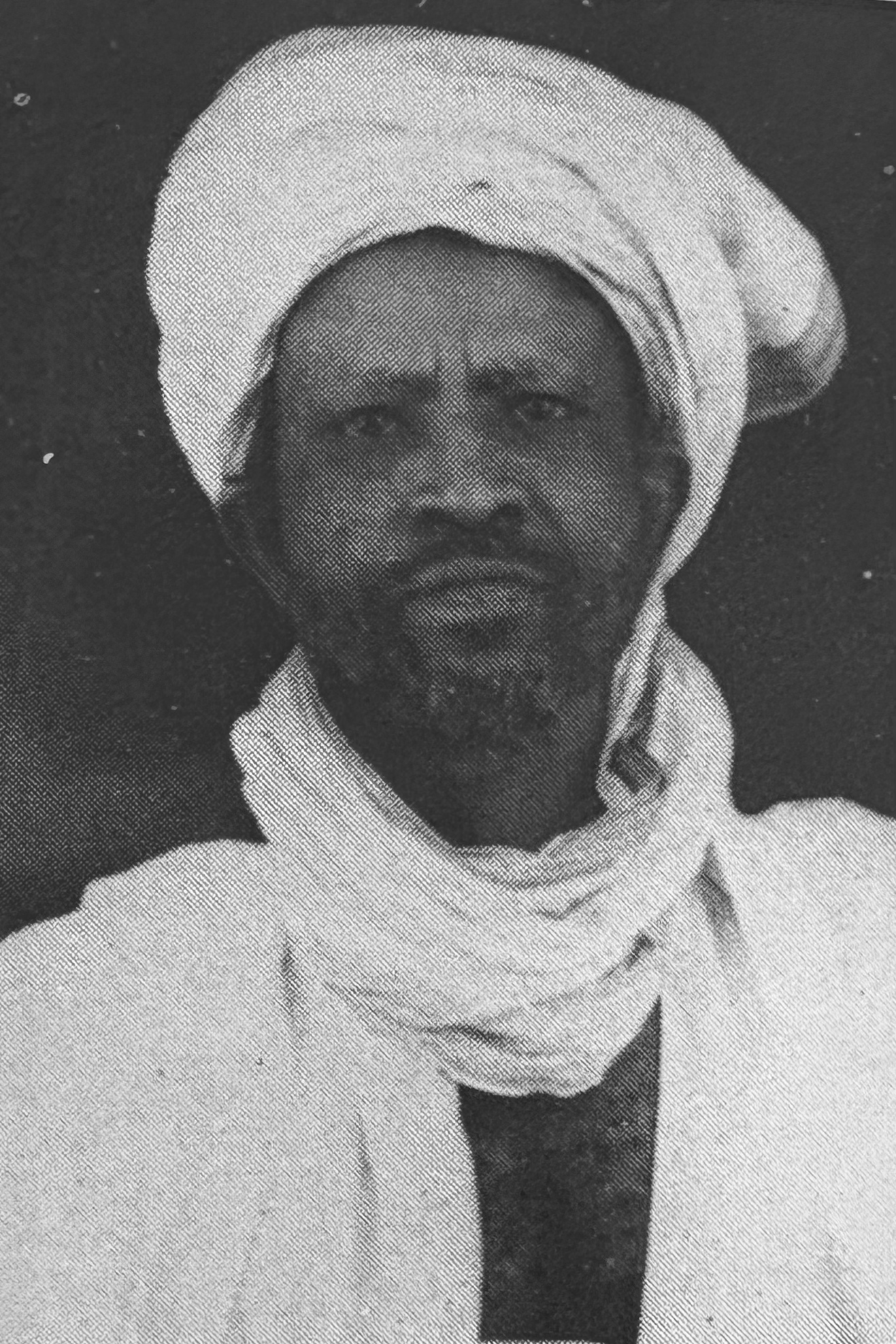
Junaidu in 1955

Dr. Waziri Junaidu (1906 – 9 January 1997) was a Nigerian historian, writer and one of the foremost scholars on Fulani history and the Sokoto Caliphate. He held the title of the Waziri of Sokoto.

== Life ==
He was born into an aristocratic family, the Gidado family of Sokoto, which had produced a large number of viziers for the caliphate. As a youth, he was tutored by Islamic scholars and was gradually introduced to his family's advisory tradition within the Sokoto chieftaincy. However, Junaidu was not tamed by the Sokoto environment and education, and wanted to learn more about other Islamic countries in Africa. He traveled to Sudan, Senegal, Saudi Arabia and a few other countries to study their histories and legal codes. After returning to Nigeria, he took to reading and writing, and subsequently wrote over 30 books. Over time, he was appointed Head of the Kadi School in 1942, a member of the Sultan's council from 1948, and a legal adviser to the Northern House of Chiefs after Nigeria's independence.

He is remembered today as a respected guardian of materials on the Sokoto caliphate and for having one of the largest archives of pre-twentieth century West African correspondence. He was both a reformer and a believer in culture. He tried to present a suitable bridge between change and tradition through both the critical analysis of past norms and values and the placing of beneficial values in concord with mainstream or reformist education.

Abdullahi dan Fodio, brother of Usman dan Fodio had claimed that the clan of Torankawa which Usman dan Fodio comes from are part Fulani, and part Arabs, he claimed the clan descent from the Arabs through Uqba ibn Nafi who was an Arab Muslim of the Umayyad branch of the Quraysh, and hence, a member of the family of the Prophet, Uqba ibn Nafi allegedly married a Fulani woman called Bajjumangbu through which the Torodbe family of Usman dan Fodio descended. Alhaji Muhammadu Junaidu, Wazirin Sokoto, restated the claim of Shaykh Abdullahi bin Fodio in respect of the Danfodio family been part Arabs and part Fulani, in one of his writings.
