= Ahmadu Atiku =

Ahmad Atiku أحمد عتيكو
- 5th Caliph of the Sokoto Caliphate
- Reign: 1859 - 1866
- Predecessor: Ali Babba bin Bello
- Successor: Aliyu Karami
- Born: 1807
- Died: 1866; Sokoto

Ahmadu Atiku (Arabic: أحمد عتيكو) (c. 1807–1866) also known as Ahmadu Zarruku was Sultan of Sokoto from 1859 to 1866. Prior to becoming Sultan, he was head of the Abu Bakr Atiku branch of Uthman Dan Fodio's family and held the title of Sarkin Zamfara with responsibilities for Sokoto town and south-east Sokoto. Atiku established the military settlement (ribat) at Chimmola which was across the valley from the town of Wurno and which he used as the seat of government.

== Life ==
Atiku was born c. 1807, he was chosen as Sultan in 1859 in succession to Ali Bello. Bello was sufficiently successful in battle and was a respected ruler; at the time of Atiku's accession, Sokoto was fully established. He was selected over Ali Karami, the Sarkin Gobir, Isa and Umar Buhari, a grandson of Uthman Dan Fodio. Atiku continued the consolidation efforts of Ali Bello, he established the ribats or settlements of Moriki, Boko and Birnin Kaya in old Zamfara and the settlement of Chafe, south east of Sokoto. Rabah, a settlement upstream of Sokoto was expanded and in the south, Ahmad's brother, Umaru Nagwamatse created the emirate of Kontagora. Atiku also encouraged furthering Sullubawa settlements. The Sullubawa were Fulfude speaking groups who had earlier settled in Hausaland. The Sullubawa expanded the settlements of Wamako, Dingyadi and Kilgori. Atiku admonished the Sullubawa and the populace to keep the law and not to take rewards for returning missing animals, cease selling farms, to obey the call of jihad and the summons of the Alkalis Atiku also reduced threat of the Gobirawa using a division between the Sarkin Gobir Bawa na Gwanki and one of his kinsmen, prince Dan Halima. Dan Halima made a peace pact with Atiku and was allowed to establish a new town Sabon Birni while he was recognized as chief of all the Gobirawa in that part of the Sultanate. The town acted as a buffer against Sarkin Gobir Bawa.
