= Ali Babba bin Bello =

Ali Babba bin Bello علي ببَّا بن بلُّو
- Sultan of Sokoto; Sarkin Musulmi (Commander of the Faithful)

3rd Caliph of Sokoto
- Reign: November 1842 - 1859
- Predecessor: Abu Bakr Atiku
- Successor: Ahmadu Atiku
- Born: 1804; Wurno
- Died: 1859; Sokoto
- Father: Muhammad Bello

Ali Babba bin Bello (Arabic: علي ببَّا بن بلُّو) (1804–1859 - aged 55) was the fourth Sultan of the Sokoto Caliphate from 1842 to 1859.

Ali bin Bello is known by a variety of different names in different sources, including: Ali bin Bello, Aliyu Babba (not to be confused with his grandson and namesake, the Emir of Kano from 1894 to 1903 with the same name), and Mai Cinaka.

== Early life ==
Ali Babba bin Bello was born in 1804 the son of Ladi, a Hausa concubine to Muhammed Bello, the second Sultan of Sokoto, and the grandson of Usman dan Fodio, the first Sultan. Although he was not born from one of the wives of Bello, he was treated as from Bello's lineage and was able to become the successor to Abu Bakr Atiku in 1842. In his selection as Sultan, he was selected instead of three other sons of Muhammadu Bello and one of his uncles for the position.

== Reign as Sultan ==
Ali Babba came into power at a tumultuous point in the Sokoto Caliphate. Usman dan Fodio and Muhammed Bello had done most of the expansion of the empire, but in recent years there were many simmering revolts from the various emirs in the Caliphate and there was constant violence between Sokoto and the Bornu Empire. Ali Babba consolidated the administration of the Sokoto Caliphate, quelled many of the tension between the Sultan and the Emirs, achieved a cessation of hostilities with Bornu, and started trading with the British Empire.

Many of the Emirs had become quite independent from the Caliphate by the time Ali Babba came to power. Revolts in Kebbi, Dendi, and Zamfara were all ended by Ali Babba during his tenure. In addition, the tension in the Adamawa Emirate, with Emir Adama threatening to leave the Sokoto Caliphate, a conflict which had reached a highpoint in the last months of his predecessors reign, was quickly resolved with Ali Babba reasserting the authority of Adama and ending recognition of his rivals. However, during his term, the Hadejia Emirate successfully rebelled from the Caliphate. The Emir of Hadejia, Buhari, had refused to submit to questioning by Ali Babba in regards to Buhari's brutality which resulted in a decade long struggle with Hadejia maintaining independence until Buhari's death.

At the same time, violence between Sokoto and Bornu had been ongoing for most of his predecessor's reign. Ali Babba was able to end slave raids by his forces into Bornu territory, grant Bornu some lands back, and negotiate a cessation of hostilities.

In 1853, explorer Heinrich Barth and Ali Babba negotiated an extensive trade agreement between the British and the Sokoto Caliphate.

== Lineage ==
Two of his sons rose to the level of Sultan of Sokoto: Umar bin Ali (Sultan from 1881 to 1891) and Muhammadu Attahiru II (the first Sultan under British Colonial rule from 1903 to 1915).

| Preceded by Abu Bakr Atiku | 4th Sokoto Caliph; 1842–1859 | Succeeded by Ahmad bin Atiku |
