= Muhammed Bello =

Second Caliph of the Sokoto Caliphate

Muhammadu Bello محمد بلُّو
- Sarkin Musulmi (Commander of the Faithful); Sarkin Sudan (Amīr al-Sūdān)
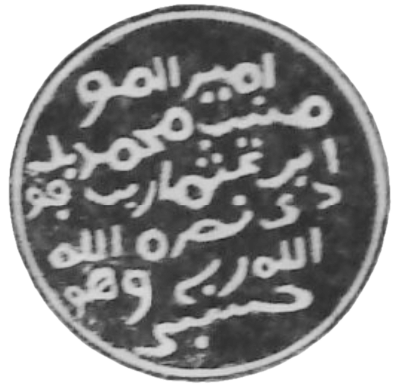
- The official seal of Muhammad Bello

2nd Caliph of Sokoto
- Reign: 21 April 1817 – 25 October 1837
- Coronation: 22 April 1817
- Predecessor: Position established Usman dan Fodio as Sarkin Musulmi
- Successor: Abu Bakr Atiku
- Born: Muhammad b. Uthman b. Muhammad Fodio; 3 November 1781
- Died: 25 October 1837 (aged 55); Wurno
- Issue: Ali Babba; Mu'azu
- Dynasty: Fodiawa
- Father: Usman dan Fodio
- Religion: Islam

Muhammadu Bello (Arabic: محمد بلو ابن عثمان ابن فودي, romanized: Muḥammad Bello bin ʿUthmān bin Fūdī; 3 November 1781 – 25 October 1837) was the second Caliph of Sokoto and reigned from 1817 until 1837. He was also an active writer of history, poetry, and Islamic studies. He was the son and primary aide to Usman dan Fodio, the founder of the Sokoto Caliphate and the first caliph. During his reign, he encouraged the spread of Islam throughout the region, increasing education for both men and women, and the establishment of Islamic courts. He died on October 25, 1837, and was succeeded by his brother Abu Bakr Atiku and then his son, Aliyu Babba.

== Early life ==
Muhammad Bello was born on 3 November 1781. His father, Usman dan Fodio, was an Islamic preacher and scholar. His mother, Hauwa, was the daughter of a Fulani Islamic scholar and a friend of his father. He was nicknamed 'Bello', meaning 'assistant' or 'helper' in Fulfulde. This likely due to his attachment to his father, who Bello always accompanied everywhere he went from a very young age later becoming Usman's wazir.

He was from a Torodbe family who are partly Arabs and partly Fulani as stated by Abdullahi dan Fodio, brother of Usman dan Fodio who claimed that their family are part Fulani, and part Arabs, they claimed to descent from the Arabs through Uqba, but Bello added that he was not sure if it was Uqba ibn Nafi, Uqba ibn Yasir or Uqba ibn Amir. The Uqba in question married a Fulani woman called Bajjumangbu through which the Torodbe family of Usman dan Fodio descended. Caliph Muhammed Bello in his book Infaq al-Mansur claimed descent from the Islamic prophet Muhammad, through his paternal grandmother Hawwa (mother of Usman dan Fodio), Alhaji Muhammadu Junaidu, Wazirin Sokoto, a scholar of Fulani history, restated the claims of Shaykh Abdullahi bin Fodio in respect of the Danfodio family been part Arabs and part Fulani, while Ahmadu Bello in his autobiography written after independence replicated Caliph's Muhammadu Bello claim of descent from the Arabs through Usman Danfodio's mother, the historical account indicates that the family of Shehu dan Fodio are partly Arabs and partly Fulani who culturally assimilated with the Hausas and can be described as Hausa-Fulani Arabs. Prior to the beginning of the 1804 Jihad the category Fulani was not important for the Torankawa (Torodbe), their literature reveals the ambivalence they had defining Torodbe-Fulani relationships. They adopted the language of the Fulbe and much ethos while maintaining a separate identity. The Toronkawa clan at first recruited members from all levels of Sūdānī society, particularly the poorer people. Toronkawa clerics included people whose origin was Fula, Wolof, Mande, Hausa and Berber. However, they spoke the Fula language, married into Fulbe families, and became the Fulbe scholarly caste.

Muhammed Bello was born to the fourth wife of Usman dan Fodio, known as Hauwa or Inna Garka, in 1781 Similar to all his siblings, he was involved in studies directed by his father in Degel until the family and some followers were exiled in 1804. In 1809, Bello was responsible for the founding of Sokoto which would become the key capital for his father's conquest of Hausa lands in the Fulani War (1804-1810).

Many of his siblings dedicated significant time to scholastic efforts and became well known in this regard. Notable amongst these were his sister Nana Asma’u, a poet and teacher, and Abu Bakr Atiku, who would become his successor as Sultan.

== Sarkin Musulmi (1817–1837) ==
Following the jihad of Usman dan Fodio, the Sokoto Caliphate was one of the largest states in Africa and included large populations of both Fulani and Hausa. Usman dan Fodio tried to largely suppress Hausa systems, including traditional leadership, education, and language. Usman retired from administration of the state in 1815 and put Muhammed Bello in charge of some of the Eastern Emirates of the Caliphate. Bello Presided over this Emirates from the city of Wurno close to Sokoto.

Upon the Death of Dan-Fodio, the Caliphate was thrown into disarray when the supporters of Bello encircled and sealed the gates of Sokoto, preventing other notable contenders to the office of Caliph ( including Bello's uncle Abdullahi Ibn Fodio and Mallam Abdussalami Bagimbane ) from entering the city. The Caliphate eventually fractured into four Self-governing parts of which only the parts ruled by Bello's uncle; Abdullahi Ibn Fodio were to recognize and pay allegiance to Bello.

Sultan Bello faced early challenges from dissident leaders and the aristocracy of both Fulani and Hausa populations. In contrast with his father, his administration was more permissive of many Hausa systems that had existed prior to the caliphate. For Fulani populations, who had been largely pastoral prior to this point, Bello encourages permanent settlement around designed ribats with schools, mosques, fortifications, and other buildings. Although these moves ended much opposition, some dissident leaders such as 'Abd al-Salam and Dan Tunku continued to cause early resistance to his rule. Dan Tunku remained a significant dissident leader as the head of the Emirate of Kazaure. Although Dan Tunku had fought on the side of his father in the Fulani War, when Bello named Ibrahim Dabo the Emir of Kano in 1819, Dan Tunku organized oppositional forces in revolution. Bello assisted Ibrahim Dabo in defeating the forces of Dan Tunku and building significant fortresses throughout the region where Dan Tunku had drawn his power.

After ending some early opposition, the Sultan focused on consolidating his administration throughout the empire with significant construction, settlement, and uniform systems of justice. One significant aspect that he expanded from his father was greatly expanded education of both men and women. His sister, Nana Asma’u, became a crucial part of expanding education to women becoming an important teacher and liaison to rural women to encourage education.

During Muhammad Bello's rule, El Hadj Umar Tall, future founder of the Toucouleur empire, settled in Sokoto on his return from Mecca in 1822. Umar Tall was greatly influenced by Sultan Muhammad Bello as evidenced by the praise Tall lavished upon the Sultan in his own writings. To affirm a permanent alliance, Sultan Bello married one of his daughters to Hajj Umar who remained in Sokoto as a judge (qadi), and as a commanding officer in the Sultan's infantry until Bello's death.

Hugh Clapperton visited the court of Bello in 1824 and wrote a lot about the generosity and intelligence of the Sultan. Clapperton was very impressed at the writing works by Bello and his exhaustive knowledge regarding British exploration in India. In 1826, Clapperton returned for a second visit, but Bello would not let him cross the border because of warfare with the Bornu Empire and Clapperton became ill and died.

In 1836, the kingdom of Gobir revolted against Sokoto rule. Sultan Muhammed Bello gathered his forces and crushed the rebellion on 9 March 1836 at the Battle of Gawakuke.

While ruling, he continued with significant educational pursuits, mainly history and poetry. His Infaku'l Maisuri (The Wages of the Fortunate) is often considered a definitive history of the Fulani Wars and his father's empire. He wrote hundreds of texts on history, Islamic studies, and poetry during his lifetime.

He died of natural causes, at the age of 58, on October 25, 1837, in Wurno and was succeeded by his brother Abu Bakr Atiku as Sultan.

Preceded by Usman dan Fodio	2nd Sokoto Caliph; 1815–1837	Succeeded by Abu Bakr Atiku
