= Abu Bakr Atiku =

Abu Bakr Atiku أبو بكر أتيكو
- Sarkin Musulmi (Commander of the Faithful)

3rd Caliph of Sokoto
- Reign: 26 October 1837 - 23 November 1842
- Predecessor: Muhammed Bello
- Successor: Aliyu Babba
- Born: Abu Bakr b. Uthman b. Muhammad Fodio; 1782
- Died: 23 November 1842; Katuru, Zamfara
- Burial: November 1842; Katuru, Zamfara
- Issue: at least 10, including: Ahmadu Atiku; Abdur Rahman Atiku; Umaru Nagwamatse; Muhammad Sambo Nabakura; Hasan, Sarkin Zamfara; Isa
- Father: Usman dan Fodio

Abu Bakr Atiku (Arabic: أبو بكر أتيكو; 1782–1842) was the third Sultan of the Sokoto Caliphate, reigning from October 1837 until November 1842.

== Early years ==
Abu Bakr Atiku dan Shehu was born to the second wife of Usman dan Fodio in 1782. He was involved, as were all his siblings, in studies directed by his father in Degel until the family and some followers were exiled in 1804. Like his brother Muhammed Bello and his sister Nana Asma’u, he dedicated significant part of his early years to study and wrote poetry, history, and on Islamic studies. Many of his works of history and poetry survive and are considered key texts of the era.

In 1815, when Usman dan Fodio died, he briefly contested his brother Muhammed Bello for control of the Sokoto Caliphate. The bloodless succession struggle ended with Bello the Sultan of the Caliphate and Atiku imprisoned for one year. When he was released, he became an adviser to Mohammed Bello for the remainder of Bello's life.

== Sultan ==
Atiku became the Sultan in 1837 when his brother Muhammed Bello died. Atiku was disliked by some of the Emirs of the Caliphate who tried to organize for other candidates, but Atiku was quickly named the successor to his brother.

Atiku attempted to reverse some of the policies of Bello that he considered extravagant. He banned dancing and music and made instruction in the Caliphate much more rigid. In addition, although Bello had operated his administration out of Wurno for the final years of his life, Atiku moved the capital back to Sokoto.

However, his reign was highly unpopular to both the population and the Emirs of the Caliphate. At the end of his reign, the tension came to a fore when he recognized an autonomous leader carving out the Adamawa Emirate. Modibo Adama has fought in the Fulani war with Atiku's father Usman dan Fodio. Atiku saw an opportunity to support a ruler more loyal to him in Hamman Sambo and so recognized an independent Emirate under Hamman Sambo that took a significant part of the Adamawa territory. Adama threatened to leave the Sokoto Caliphate and instead join the Ottoman Caliphate as a result of the situation. The Adamawa Emirate was close to civil war until emissaries arrived revealing that Atiku had died and his successor had quickly reversed the decision to recognize Sambo.

== Death ==
In the autumn of 1842, during the islamic months of sha'aban and ramadan, he led an attack on Tsibiri in Maradun. All the eastern Emirs of the caliphate were said to be present except Yaqubu dan Dadi of the Bauchi emirate who was too old to participate but sent his son Ibrahim in his place. Atiku was wounded during the battle, and, being weak from an earlier illness and from the effects of the fasting of Ramadan, died at Katuru.

== Lineage ==
One of his sons was Ahmadu Atiku, the fifth Sultan, and another son was `Abd ar-Rahman dan Abi Bakar, the eleventh Sultan of the Sokoto Caliphate. His grandson was Muhammadu Attahiru I, final sultan of the independent Sokoto Caliphate.

Preceded by Muhammed Bello	3rd Sokoto Caliph; 1837–1842	Succeeded by Ali Babba bin Bello
