= Abdullahi dan Fodio =

Islamic scholar and first Emir of Gwandu

Abdullahi ɗan Fodio عبد الله بن فودي

Emir of Gwandu
- Reign: 1812–8 July 1829
- Predecessor: Position established
- Successor: Muhammad Wani

Waziri of Sokoto
- In office: 1804 – 22 April 1817
- Predecessor: Position established
- Successor: Gidado ɗan Laima
- Born: Abdullah b. Muhammad; 5 November c. 1766 (1180 AH); Maganimi, Gobir (in present-day Nigeria)
- Died: 8 July 1829 (aged 62)
- Burial: Gwandu, Kebbi state
- Wives: Inna Hawwa; Aya; Jenne; Fatima
- Issue: 21 children, including: Muhammad Wani; Ibrahim Khalilu; Aliyu; Abd al-Qadir Ayi
Temple name
- Hubbare Abdullahi (Tomb of Abdullahi) in Gwandu, Kebbi state
- Family: Fodiawa
- Father: Muhammadu Fodio
- Mother: Hauwa bnt Muhammad
- Arabic name
- Patronymic (Nasab): Abdullah b. Muhammad b. Uthman b. Salih b. Harun b. Gurdo b. Jabbo b. Muhammad Sambo b. Ayyub b. Masiran b. Buba Baba b. Musa Jakollo

Religious life
- Religion: Islam
- Denomination: Sunni
- Jurisprudence: Maliki
- Tariqa: Qadiri
- Creed: Ash'ari

Abdullahi ɗan Fodio (Arabic: عبد الله بن فودي, romanized: ʿAbd Allāh ibn Fūdī; ca. 1766–1828), was a prominent Islamic scholar, jurist, poet, grammarian, and theologian, and the first Amir of Gwandu (r. 1812–1828) and first Wazirin Sokoto (Grand Vizier of Sokoto). His brother, Usman dan Fodio (1754–1817) was the founder of the Sokoto Caliphate. Usman, being more of a scholar than a politician, delegated the practical regency of the western part of his empire to Abdullahi and the eastern part to his son Muhammed Bello, who later became the Sultan of Sokoto after his father.

== Early life ==
Abdullahi ɗan Fodio was born in the small village of Maganimi in 1766. His father, Muhammad bin Uthman, was a local Islamic teacher (mallam), scribe, and religious leader of his community. Muhammad's expertise in Islamic jurispudence earned him the Fulani nickname Fodiye (Fodio in Hausa), derived from the Arabic Faqīh (jurist). His mother Hauwa bint Muhammad came from a family locally renowned for their learning. Hauwa's family claimed descent (Note: Abd al-Qadir b. Gidado (died 1859) gives the descent: Hawwa bint Muhammad b. Ahmad al-Sharif b. 'Ali al-Yanbu'i b. 'Abd al-Razzaq b. al-Salih b. al-Mubarak b. Ahmad b. Abi'l-Hasan al-Shadhali b. 'Abdullah b. 'Abd al-Jabbar b. Hurmuz b. Hatim b. Qusay b. Yusha' b. Ward b. Battal b. Ahmad b. Tamim b. Muhammad b. 'Isa b. Muhammad b. al-Hasan b. Fatima, daughter of Muhammad.) from the Islamic Prophet Muhammed through Maulay Idris I of Morocco.

Unlike his brother and his other relatives, who were of "sparse physique" and lighter-skinned, Abdullahi is traditionally described as being "tall, fat and black."

=== Education ===
Abdullahi's earliest known teacher was his mother, Hauwa, who taught him the basics of Islam. His father later took over as his primary teacher. It is likely that Abdullahi's formal study of Islam began around the age of 5, and by the time he reached 13, he had reportedly already memorised the Qur'an.

Subsequently, his older brother Usman assumed the role of his teacher, imparting more advanced subjects in Islam, such as Tauhid, Sufism and Mantiq. Usman further introduced him to Islamic poetry, including works like the Mu'allaqat poems, which had a significant influence on Abdullahi's later writings. Usman also focused on teaching Sharia or Islamic law, with a particular emphasis on the Maliki school. Together, they studied the school's pivotal texts like the Mukhtasar al-Akhdari by al-Akhdari, and Al-Risalah. Abdullahi learnt Arabic grammar from works of Moroccan linguist Ibn Ājurrūm, and other works like Qatr al-nada and Shudhur al-dhahab both authored by Egyptian grammarian Ibn Hisham. Usman also introduced Abdullahi to elementary arithmetic.

Abdullahi belonged to the Torodbe Fulani clan, who are known for their Islamic scholarship in West Africa. Some of his other notable teachers included his uncles Muhammad ibn Raji and Abdullah ibn Muhammad Thanbu, as well as other scholars such as Muhammad al-Firabri, Muhammad al-Buttugha, Mahmud Bazanfare, (Note: His last name Bazanfare suggests a Zamfara origin.) Muhammad al-Maghuri, and the influential but controversial al-Hajj Jibril ibn Umar of Agades. He himself later became a teacher and some of his students included his nephew, Muhammad Bello, al-Mustafa b. Muhammad (the father of Abd al-Qadir dan Tafa), and Modibbo Raji, who played a significant role in shaping the Islamic scholarly tradition of Adamawa.

=== Preaching tours ===
By his early teens, Abdullahi had begun accompanying his brother Usman on preaching tours across Hausaland. Usman's sermons primarily targeted religious practices that he believed deviated from the pure teachings of Islam. Usman delivered his sermons in both Hausa and Fulfulde, sometimes incorporating poetry as a means of communication. Abdullahi's first preaching experience took place in hometown of Degel. His first tour outside of Gobir was to the nearby kingdom of Kebbi, again accompanying his brother. These tours increased their reputation in the region, drawing visitors to Degel who were eager to hear their sermons.

Usman's sermons often attracted both men and women, which led to rumours that his gatherings encouraged promiscuous mingling. During one of their tours in 1786, at a settlement called Daura just east of Bakura, a respected scholar from Bornu named al-Mustafa Gwani wrote a "rather sharp retort" accusing them of permitting such conduct. Although the criticism was mainly directed at Usman, he instructed Abdullahi, then 20 years old, to compose a reply. In it, Abdullahi agreed that the mixing of men and women at the Shehu's lectures was "an evil", but he argued that it was a lesser evil than leaving women uneducated. In his words:

The evil of leaving women in ignorance, not knowing what is incumbent upon them, nay, not knowing Islam at all, is greater than the evil of their mixing with men, for the first evil relates back to religion, which is faith, Islam and good works, and the second evil relates back to genealogy.

== Jihad ==
=== Background ===
Initially focused on reforming the practices of Muslims in line with sunni orthodoxy, Usman's preaching soon extended to the masses, drawing large gatherings at Degel. Although he shunned the courts of kings, his reform movement's implicit criticism of the established political order alarmed the Gobir king (Sarkin Gobir) Bawa jan Gwarzo, who viewed it as a developing rebellion.

In 1788-89, Bawa summoned Usman to join in the Id al-Kabir prayer in Magami, reportedly intending to harm the Shehu in order to disrupt the reformist movement. However, according to Sokoto tradition, he was swayed on that day after witnessing a mass desertion of scholars to join Usman, raising the total number of his followers to over a thousand. Since then, Sarkin Gobir Bawa did not interfere with the movement and granted Usman several concessions, including freedom to preach, fair treatment for Muslims and prisoners, and reforms to taxation.

However, Bawa's successors were more hostile to the movement, which was proving too difficult to curb. Sarkin Gobir Nafata, who ascended after Yakubu's death in 1794-95, revoked the concessions and imposed restrictive laws on the movement. In response, Usman's followers began to take a more militant stance to ensure the movement's survival. The tension worsened under Nafata's successor Yunfa, who came to power in 1801.

Yunfa had been a student of Usman and was believed that the Shehu had aided him in ascending the throne by exerting his influence. Initially, While early relations were cordial, Usman's growing influence began to rival Yunfa's own. Some of Usman's followers, including Abdullahi, distrusted Yunfa and favoured launching a jihad against Gobir. Among them was Abd al-Salam, a Hausa scholar who would later rebel against the Sokoto Caliphate. Wanted for arrest since Nafata's reign, Abd al-Salam and his disciples had fled to Gimbana in Kebbi. When Yunfa became ruler, he ordered Usman to recall Abd al-Salam to Gobir. Usman refused, further worsening their relationship.

=== Hijra ===
Yunfa sent a force to Gimbana to capture Abd al-Salam, who escaped to a nearby Fulani fortress. Yunfa's army nevertheless took several Muslim prisoners. On their return to their capital at Alkalawa, they were confronted by Usman's followers, who demanded the release of the prisoners, which was granted. When Usman learned that Abdullahi had organised this intervention without his knowledge or consent, he was furious. Yunfa responded by ordering Usman and his family to leave Gobir. Usman refused, choosing to remain in Degel, but many of his followers prepared to leave and perform the hijra, thereby declaring jihad on Gobir.

On 21 February 1804, the community left Degel, moving west to Gudu, which at the time lay in "an almost empty widerness of sand, scrub and stunted trees." Now settled, the community decided to choose a leader. Although Usman was the obvious choice, he was reluctant to accept the role. Several other candidates were considered, including Abdullahi, who was rejected as he "favoured some over others". None of the candidates were fully acceptable. In the end, Usman eventually agreed to be appointed Amīr al-muʾminīn (Commander of the faithful). Abdullahi was the first to give the salute of homage (bay'a) followed by Usman's son Muhammad Bello.

=== Battle of Tabkin Kwotto ===
The first major battle of the jihad was Battle of Tabkin Kwotto of 1804. Prior to this battle, there were several skirmishes and raids between the jihadists and the Gobirawa in the surrounding outskirts and valleys. In June 1804, Yunfa raised an army and marched on Gudu, sacking the settlement. However, Abdullahi, as Usman's Waziri, commanded the jihadist army and evacuated the camp before the attack after deserters from Yunfa's army warned of the impending ambush. The Gobir army captured the few who remained. Abdullahi shadowed the Gobirawa, attempting to lure them into battle on ground of his own choosing, but they repeatedly avoided direct engagement.

In an attempt to force a battle and cut off the jihadists' line of retreat, Yunfa led his army west of their position and camped near Lake Kwotto (Tabkin Kwotto), about twenty miles from Gudu. The army camped on hilly ground with a thicket to their front, hoping it would keep the jihadist army at a distance. Abdullahi correctly guessed this plan, and decided to meet them at the lake. He led the army on a night march to Gurdam, a village near Lake Kwotto.

On the morning of 21 June, after performing the dawn prayer, the jihadist army formed its battle lines. Yunfa's forces were caught by surprise when they found the jihadist army fully prepared at the sides of the lake, which gave Abdullahi's smaller and ill-equipped army a psychological advantage. Initially the battle went badly for the jihadists, who were surrounded by the large Gobir cavalry and forced into a tight square formation. However, the square enabled the jihadist archers to maximise the long-range and rapid-fire ability of their weapons. The battle soon developed into a bloody hand-to-hand struggle. After suffering heavy losses, the Gobirawa broke ranks and fled into the thickets.

=== First siege of Alkalawa and Battle of Tsuntsua ===
Following their victory at Tabkin Kwotto, the jihadists captured several Gobir villages and towns. However, hostility from the local population and a shortage of supplies forced them to leave Gobir. They moved further south into Zamfara, which had been weakened and fractured after half a century of war with Gobir. The Zamfarawa welcomed the jihadists, especially after their recent successes against Gobir.

Confident after their gains, the jihadists launched another major attack on Gobir at the end of the 1804 rainy season. Under Abdullahi's command and allied with the Tuaregs of Adar and Aïr, they advanced on the fortified Gobir capital of Alkalawa in November 1804. After subduing surrounding towns and villages, they began the siege. According to Bello, the jihadists fought "a hotly contested battle", but were unable to press follow through. The allied Tuaregs eventually abandoned the campaign and raided Fulani settlements on their return home.

In response, Usman, who had not joined the campaign up to that point, swiftly set out with reinforcements. While Bello remained to continue the siege, Abdullahi split off to also confront the Tuareg raiders. With the jihadist forces now dispersed, the Gobirawa saw an opportunity to attack. The ensuing battle took place at Tsuntsua, a village about two miles from Alkalawa. Gobir won a decisive victory, killing more than 2,000. With Usman's late reinforcements, the jihadists were able to push the Gobirawa back to their capital before retreating themselves. The defeat at Tsuntsua was particularly devastating as many famous scholars were among the dead, including Abdullahi's cousin, Imam Muhammad Sambo, the chief judge. More than 200 of those killed were said to have memorised the Qur'an.

=== Kebbi expedition ===
Following the defeat at Tsuntsua, Usman's community spent the rest of Ramadan in the valley west of Alkalawa before returning south into Zamfara in search of food. By March 1805, they had established a camp at Sabon Gari in southwestern Zamfara. Soon after, Usman ordered a campaign into the Kingdom of Kebbi to capture its capital, Birnin Kebbi. The force was jointly commanded by Waziri Abdullahi and Sarkin Yaki (Captain general) Ali Jedo. The campaign was strategically important, as Kebbi's fertile lands offered favorable conditions for farming, which would provide a stable food supply for the community.

They first marched into the Zamfara valley, seizing the town of Gummi, which was then loyal to Gobir. After capturing the town, the local chief was compelled to make peace. From there, the jihadists advanced toward Birnin Kebbi, conquering several settlements and fortresses along the way. In April 1805, upon reaching the walls of Birnin Kebbi, Abdullahi attempted to negotiate with the kingdom's ruler, Muhammad Hodi, urging him to abandon "un-Islamic" practices. Negotiations were eventually abandoned on the third day, and a fierce battle broke out. The jihadists eventually breached the city's walls and captured it on 12 April 1805. They seized "more plunder than was ever captured before or after" during the jihad. Following the fall of his capital, Sarkin Kebbi Hodi managed to escape capture and fled north. In his place, Abdullahi installed his uncle, Usman Massa, who had joined the jihad prior to the expedition.

Around the same time, a jihadist force under Bello successfully laid siege to the important fortress of Kanoma (now in Maru), a Zamfara stronghold. With these two successful campaigns, the jihadists established a fortified line right up the Zamfara valley, with the strongholds of Birnin Kebbi in the west and Kanoma in the east as pivots and sallyports on each flank. Despite these successes, the jihadist community were forced to leave Zamfara. This was due to the increasing hostility of the Zamfarawa, which was as a result of some tyrannical commanders. In his Infaq al-Maysur, Bello complained: "...our people were oppressing them. They thought that by oppression they would gain their ends but the Zamfarawa resented it and our cause was injured."

In October 1805, the Shehu's community set out for Gwandu. Located in the now pacified Kebbi region, the town offered fertile lands and resources that could sustain the entire community. It is possible that the choice of Gwandu was influenced by the brothers' familiarity with the area, as they had previously traveled through it during their preaching tours before the onset of the jihad.

=== Battle of Alwassa ===
While the jihadists were settling at Gwandu, Gobir was forming a large coalition in the north, which included Kebbawa and Zamfarawa rebels, Tuareg groups, and contingents from other Hausa states. In late 1805, the alliance set out for Gwandu. The jihadist commanders were divided on how to respond, Sarkin Yaki Ali Jedo was adamant on an aggressive approach with both armies meeting in a pitched battle, while another faction led by Bello strongly opposed this instead preferred a defensive strategy. Eventually, Jedo's approach with the army jointly commanded by him and Abdullahi was agreed on. Bello initially stayed back, due to sickness, but Usman ordered him back. Following Bello's arrival, the commanders again debated strategy, this time Abdullahi supporting Bello's defensive strategy. Yet again, Jedo's plan was agreed upon.

On the eve of the battle, the jihadist army advanced on the small town of Kwolda and ransacked it. Despite Abdullahi's pleading the rebellious soldiers continued its plundering. Bello also tried prevent them but he "came near to being killed and was forced to withdraw." After the mutiny, Abdullahi and Bello again urged a withdrawal but were again unsuccessful. As a result, the army continued on until they met the alliance at Alwassa (near Argungu). There the jihadist army suffered a disastrous defeat against the alliance, with Bello estimating over a thousand killed. After retreating to Gwandu, the demoralised and divided jihadists defended the lightly fortified town over the course of five days. Worsening the situation, Sarkin Kebbi Usman Massa rebelled and joined the coalition against the jihadists. Despite the light fortifications and being heavily outnumbered, the jihadists emerged victorious and repelled the coalition. They were advantaged by the hilly, stony terrain surrounding the town which heavily disadvantaged the cavalry reliant coalition, and made the jihadists archers very effective.

Although they survived the campaign, the jihadists suffered heavy losses. As at Tsuntsua,many respected scholars were killed, many of whom were friends of Abdullahi. This deeply disheartened him:

I have been left among a remnant who neglect their prayers
And obey, in procuring pleasures, their own souls.
And the majority of them have traded their faith for the world.
Preferring what they desire; and the heart wheedles,
Bold for forbidden food, and the eating of it,
As the beasts eat, they eat the tree of Hell.
They do not listen to orders, they disobey their imam
And whosoever stands and forbids them from evil, it is as if he spoke foul language!

=== Desertion ===
Great Mosque of Kano (1962)

Following the Alwassa–Gwandu campaign, the jihadists turned to subduing the rebelling Kebbawa. By the end of the dry season of 1806, much of Kebbi was under their control, and the deserter Usman Massa was killed. From their now fortified base at Gwandu, fighting continued, with expeditions dispatched to Yauri, Borgu, Dendi, and Bauchi. In the autumn of 1807, the jihadists set out to attack Alkalawa. On the night of 4 October, Abdullahi and five companions abandoned the army and began travelling toward Mecca. His departure was motivated by a belief that the jihad had shifted away from spiritual and religious revival to more materialistic pursuits. Regarding this decision, Abdullahi wrote:

Then there came to me from God the sudden thought to shun the homelands, and my brothers, and turn towards the best of God's creation, in order to seek approval, because of what I had seen of the changing times, and (my) brothers, and their inclination towards the world, and their squabbling over its possession, and its wealth, and its regard, together with their abandoning the upkeep of the mosques and the schools, and other things besides that. I knew that I was the worst of them, and that what I had seen from others would not deter me. I considered flight incumbent upon me, and I left the army and occupied myself with my own (affairs) and faced towards the East, towards the Chosen One–– may God bless him and give him peace––if God would make that easy.

After three days of travel, they reached Kano. There, Abdullahi found "among them that from which I had fled in my own country." The Kanawa persuaded him to stay and guide them in establishing an Islamic state. As a result, he authored Diya al-hukkam ('Light of the lawyers'). The book focused on governance in accordance with Sharia, emphasising the application of Islamic law in matters of administration, the principles of hereditary systems of government and the importance of accountability for those in positions of power. In addition to writing, Abdullahi dedicated himself to teaching the Quran and delivering tafsir lectures during Ramadan in 1807. He also set the qiblah (direction of prayer) for the Great Mosque of Kano, located near the emir's palace.

=== Fall of Alkalawa ===
Abdullahi eventually rejoined the jihad in late 1807. In the following year, the jihadists under Bello's command finally captured Alkalawa and killed Sarkin Gobir Yunfa, effectively the kingdom and marking the conclusion of Usman's jihad.

== Emir of Gwandu ==
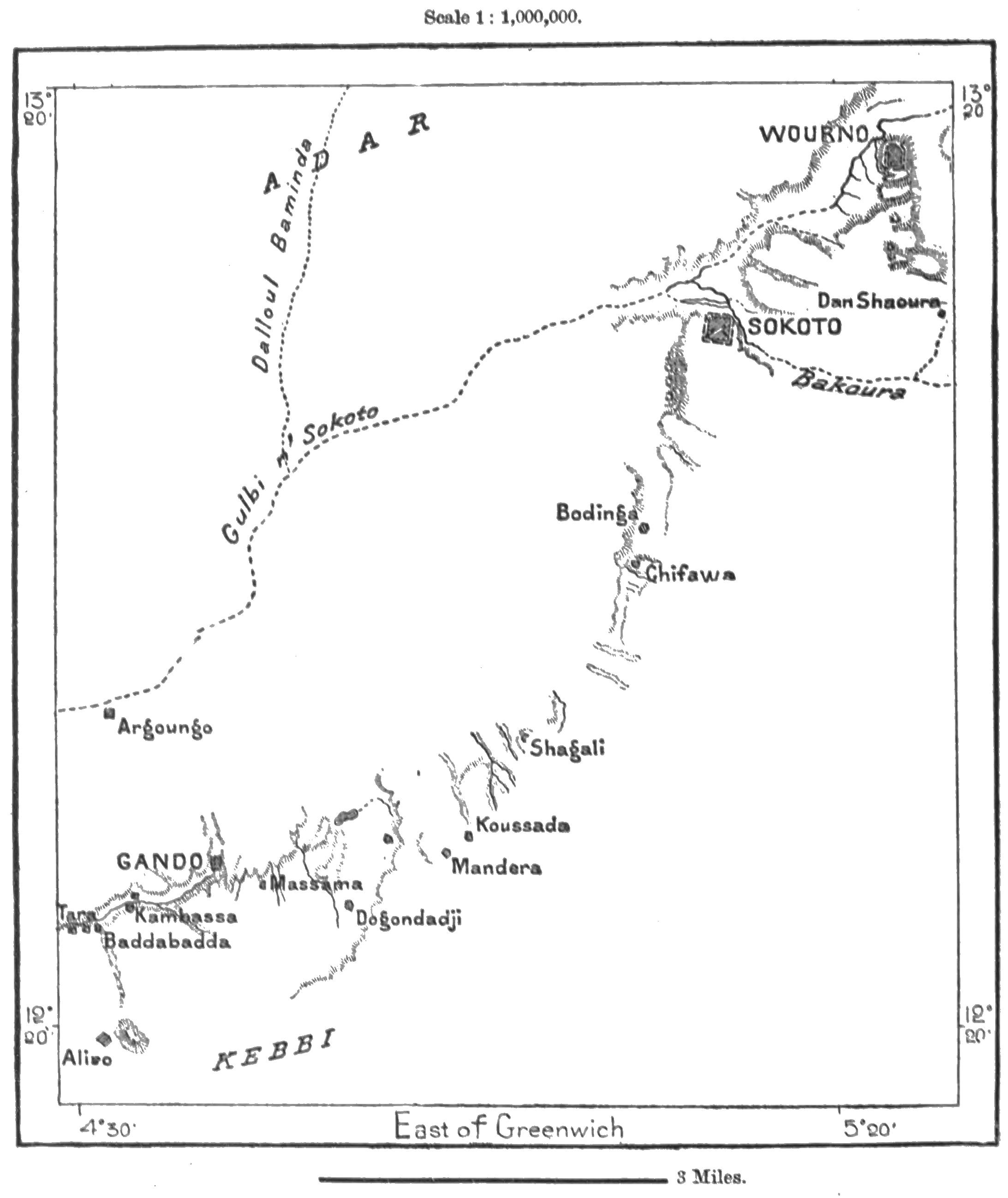
Map of Gwandu and Sokoto, highlighting Bodinga and Sifawa. By Élisee Reclus (1892)

Around December 1809, Usman moved north-east to Sifawa with Bello, leaving Abdullahi in Gwandu to continue the jihad in the western territories. One possible reason for this may have been to restore confidence in the west, as many inhabitants had also begun to follow Usman eastward. Abdullahi first conducted raids into Gurma, occupying the provinces of Dandi, Kamba, and Zaberma, extending the Caliphate's reach to the Niger River in the south-west.

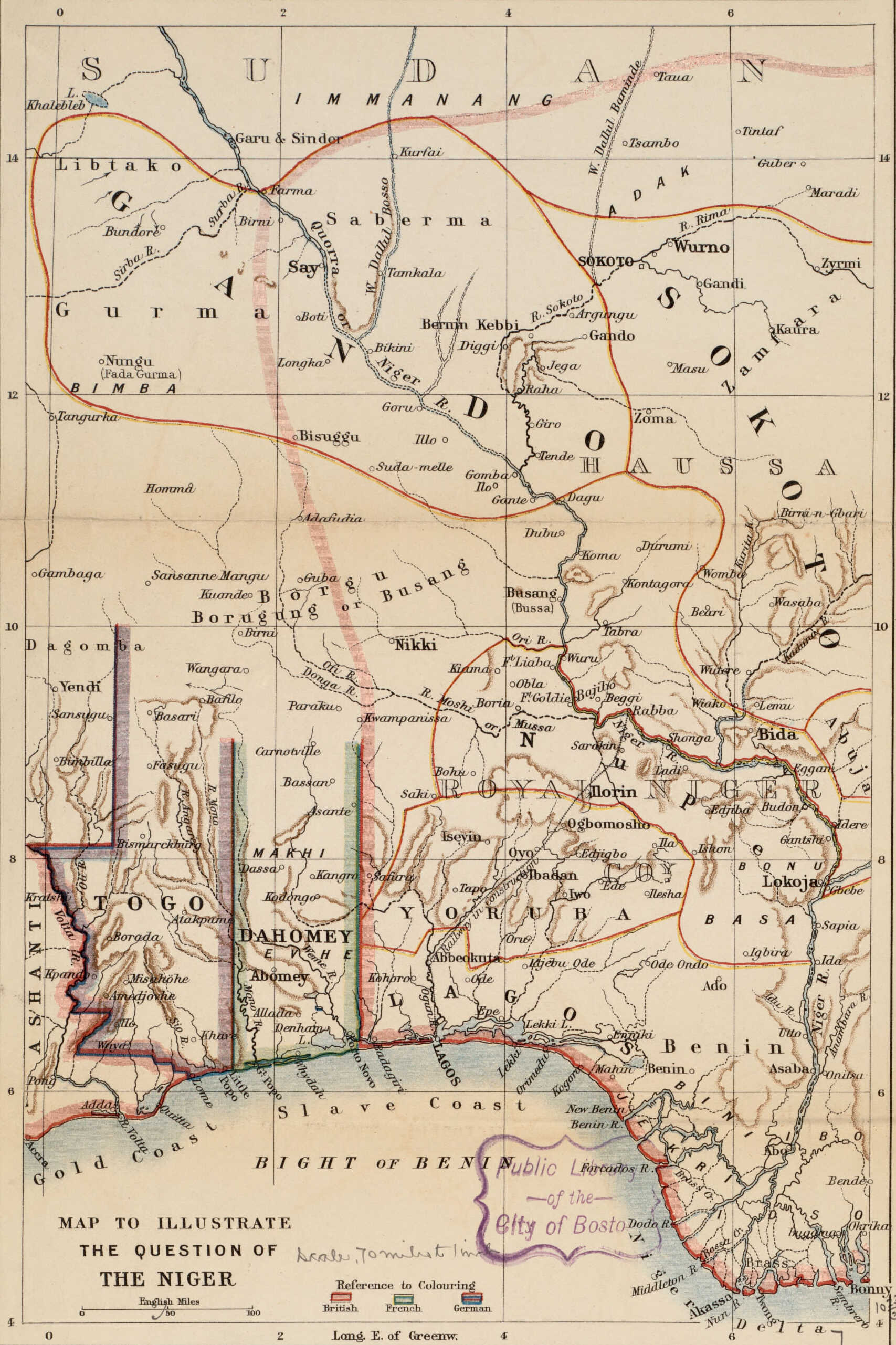
An 1898 map of the Gwandu Emirate

In 1811, Abdullahi moved permanently to Bodinga. The following year, Usman divided authority of the newly consolidated Sokoto Caliphate. The territories was divided into four regions: Abdullahi was assigned the west, Bello the east, Ali Jedo the north, and Usman's son Muhammad Buhari along with Abd al-Salam took charge of the south. Their role was to supervise emirates on behalf of the Amir al-mu'minīn. Thereafter, Usman withdrew from public life and returned to writing and teaching.

At the time of the division, the western territories included the Niger valley down to Nupe and extended as far west as Dendi. It later expanded to include Ilorin in the south and Liptako in the west. It is possible that Abdullahi expected to further extend farther west and include the Fulani of Masina, but a separate caliphate was later declared there under Ahmadu Lobbo.

Around this period, Abdullahi completed what is considered his magnum opus, Tazyīn al-waraqāt (Adornment of Papers), a history of the jihad that collected together the best of his poems. In its preface, he announced that he would stop composing poems because "there was no benefit in them... as regards religion." He instead continued writing on correct Islamic governance.

In 1815, Usman relocated to Sokoto. Two years later, on 12 April 1817, he died of illness. Abdullahi immediately rode to Sokoto to pay his respects and take part in succession discussions. However, on his arrival he found the gates closed and was denied entry. Disheartened, he returned to Bodinga, while Muhammad Bello was elected caliph. Abdullahi may have expected to be chosen, given his seniority, his role as vizier, and his scholarly reputation. This strained his relationship with Bello, but the two reconciled in 1820–21 when Bello unexpectedly assisted him in suppressing a revolt against Gwandu by a combined force of Gobirawa, Zamfarawa, and Dendawa at Kalambaina.

After the jihad, Abdullahi, like his brother, eventually stopped leading military campaigns and devoted himself to scholarship and teaching. His writings from this period show him as "a mature scholar with a concern for his soul, rather than an administrator concerned with the government of his territories." He delegated military responsibilities to his son Muhammad Wani, who led expeditions into Nupeland and Gwariland and suppressed revolts in Kebbi. Abdullahi ensured a smooth succession by appointing Wani as his deputy, securing his position as undisputed successor in Gwandu.

=== Death ===
Abdullahi dan Fodio died in July 1829 (1245 A.H.) at the age of sixty-six in Gwandu. As his health deteriorated, he summoned his son back to Gwandu from Birnin Kebbi to ensure his proper burial. With Abdullahi's death, Wani assumed the position of Sarkin Gwandu and relocated to the city of Gwandu to carry out his responsibilities as the new Emir.

==== Sonnore Abdullahi ====
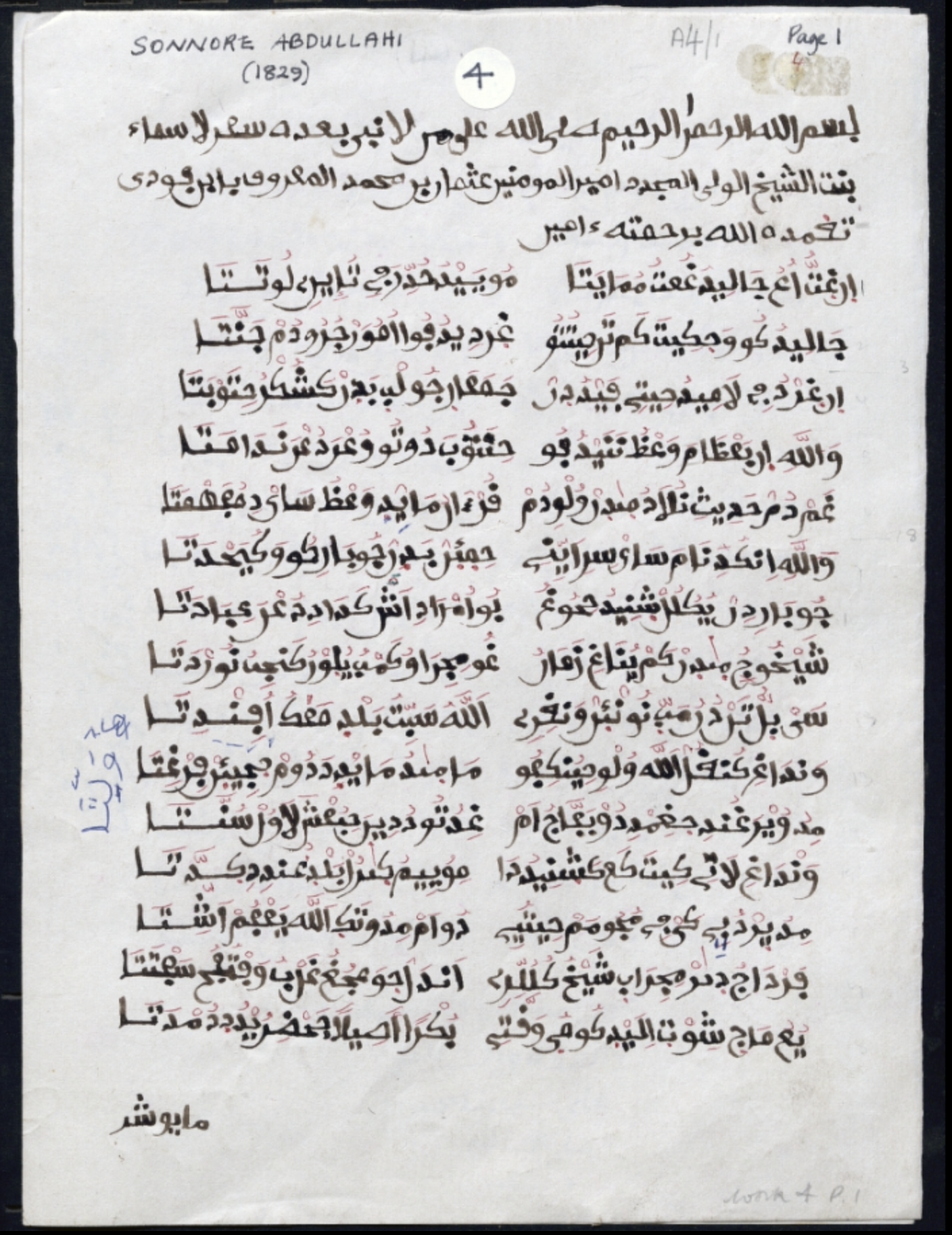
The original manuscript of Sonnore Abdullahi written by Nana Asma'u in 1829

After Abdullahi's passing, Nana Asma'u, poet and daughter of Usman dan Fodio, wrote an elegy for her uncle. Originally composed in 1829–30 in Fulfulde, the poem had thirty-one lines.

== Waziri of Sokoto ==
Abdullahi served as Shehu Usman's 'helper' since their preaching days but he was not formally recognised as the Shehu's Waziri (Grand Vizier) until the inauguration of Usman as Amir al-mu'minnin in 1805. He was the first recognise the Shehu as the Commander of the faithful followed by Bello.

After assuming the position of Sultan of Sokoto, Muhammad Bello appointed Gidado dan Laima as the new Wazirin Sokoto. However, due to their ongoing conflict, Abdullahi refused to acknowledge the legitimacy of both Bello and Gidado's positions. However, after the Battle of Kalambaina in 1819, they both reconciled. Sultan Bello, mounted on his war-horse, attempted to approach Abdullahi, who was riding his mare, like the Shehu, a choice he saw as befitting his status as a malam or learned man. Bello tried to perform the customary greeting of jafi, as a sign of respect to his uncle, but his horse did not cooperate. Recognizing the gesture, Abdullahi courteously signaled for Bello to remain in the saddle and then officially saluted him as Amir al-mu'minin. He removed his own gown and turban, handing them over to Gidado, thereby acknowledging and affirming Gidado's position as the Wazirin Sokoto. Even today, this ceremony continues to be observed whenever the Emir of Gwandu visits the Sultan's palace in Sokoto. The Wazirin Sokoto greets the Emir, and as a mark of respect and tradition, the Emir hands over his gown and turban to the Wazirin Sokoto, symbolizing the enduring legacy of Abdullahi's act of acknowledgment and the ongoing relationship between Gwandu and Sokoto. Abdullahi further gave Gidado a quiver, a bow, a sword and 'some other things' to signify the office of the Vizier and are in possession of the current Wazirin Sokoto, Professor Sambo Wali Junaidu.

=== Responsibilities ===
Abdullahi distinguishes three categories of viziers, the highest being Wazir al-tafwid (Minister with delegated authority). This role involves the caliph (or sultan) delegating full authority to the appointed individual, similar to the function of a Prime Minister. The Wazir assumes a vital responsibility of overseeing and managing all affairs within the caliphate. They are entrusted with the task of making independent political decisions and are required to possess a high level of trustworthiness and reliability. A comprehensive understanding of the Law and its court systems is also essential for fulfilling the obligations of this position. Abdullahi further states that the authority vested in the role of the Wazir al-tafwid is almost equivalent to that of the caliph, albeit with a few limitations. Firstly, the wazir does not possess the authority to designate an heir-apparent to succeed the caliph. Secondly, the wazir does not have the privilege to request relief from their duty, nor can they dismiss individuals appointed by the caliph from their respective offices. The other two types of wazirs listed by Abdullahi is the Wazir al-tanfidh (Executive Minister), who was to carry out the policies of the caliph, and Wazir al-istisharah (Advisory Minister), who acts as a councillor to the caliph.

== Writings ==
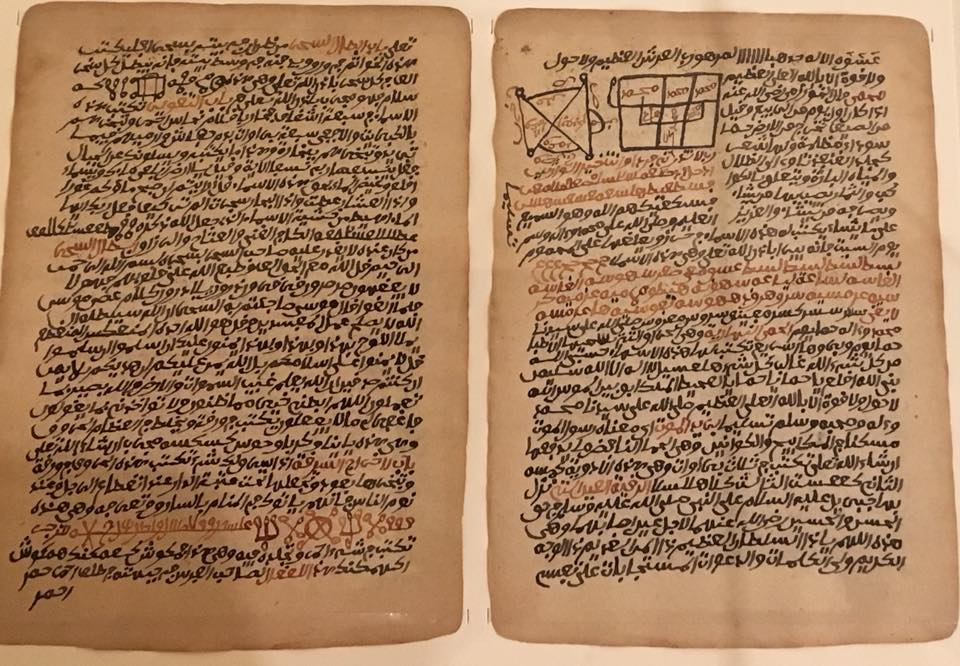
A manuscript of the Miftāḥ li–l Tafsīr completed in Degel in 1794-5

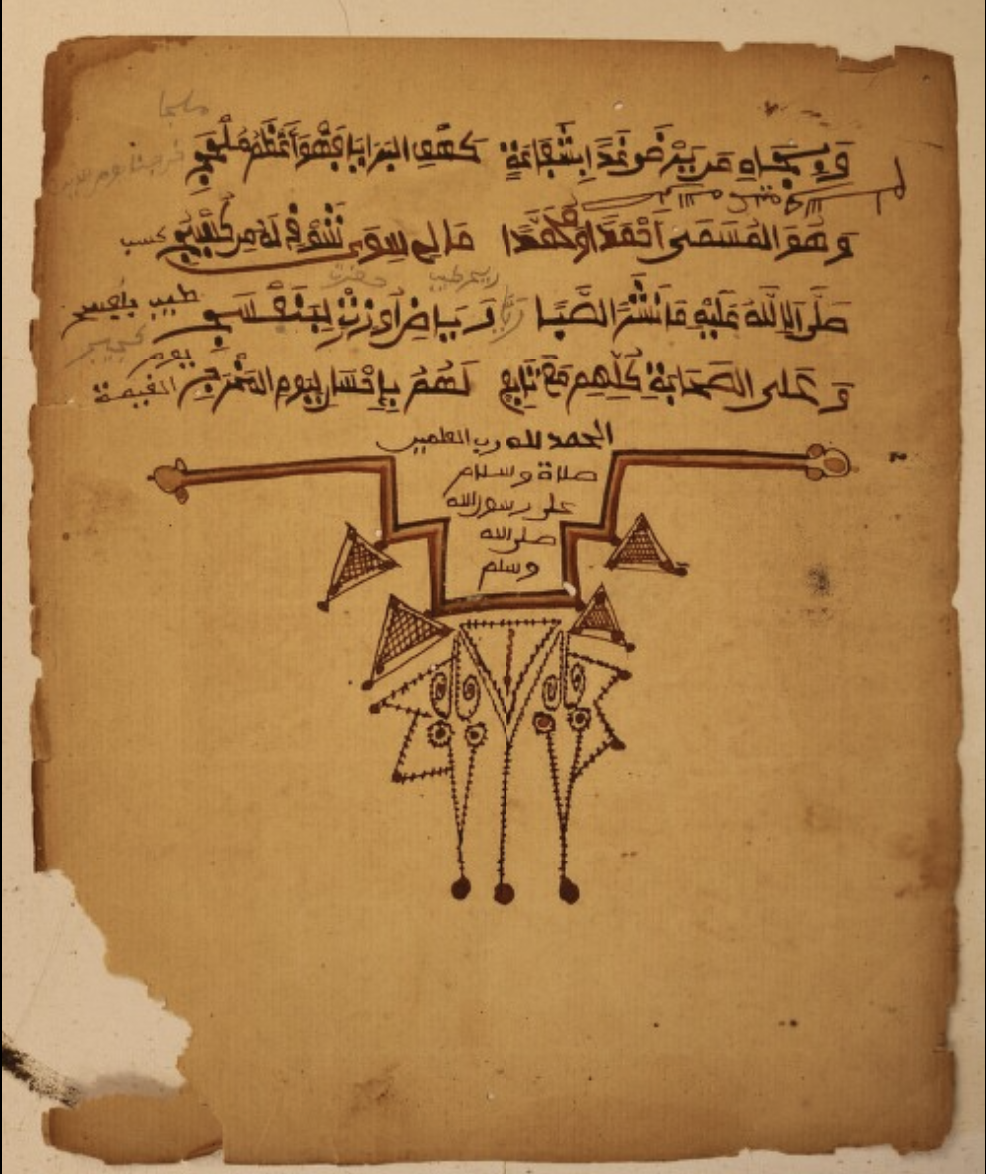
A page from a poem by Abdullahi where he thanks his teachers which features a decorative marker pattern. Such markers are common in Hausa calligraphy.

Abdullahi made significant literary contributions that spanned a wide array of subjects, particularly within the realm of Islam, making it challenging to neatly categorize his works. His earliest known work was a poem written when he was eight years old, and his last in 1828. Among the scholars of the 19th-century Sokoto Caliphate, he stood out as the sole author who wrote on Tafsir, or Quranic exegesis. Noteworthy works in this area include Kifayat al-Dua'fa' al-Sudan and Diya' al-Ta'weel fi ma'ani al-Tanzeek. Abdullahi also tackled various advanced aspects of the religion, addressing topics such as Tajweed, the art of Quranic recitation, and Mastalah al-hadeeth, which deals with the principles of Hadith studies. Furthermore, he dedicated attention to the study of the Arabic language, producing works on Balagh (rhetoric), Nahwu (grammar), as well as syntax and phonology. These valuable works continue to be studied not only within Nigeria but also in other regions such as Egypt and the broader Middle East. With approximately eighty writings to his name, Abdullahi is widely regarded as the "greatest Nigerian poet in classical Arabic literature".

One notable collection of Abdullahi's works is titled Diya, meaning 'an illuminating light'. Each work within this collection focuses on a specific juristic question, exploring different aspects of Islamic law. Examples include Diya' al Ummah, Diya' ahl-Ihtisub, Diya' al-Sultan, Diya' Al-faraid, Diya' al-Umara, Diya' al-hukkam, Diya' ul al-amr wa al-Mujahideen, and Diya' al-Ulum al-Deen.

=== Tazyin al-waraqat ===
The full title of this work is Tazyin al-waraqat bi-jam' ba'd ma li min al-abyat (Decorating Pages with Some of my Poems) and it was completed on 14 October 1813 in Bodinga. It consists of thirty-six folios. This work by Abdullahi serves as a historical source, providing a contextual understanding of the jihad in Sokoto through his numerous poems dedicated to the campaigns. It shares similarities with other renowned works such as Ayyam al-Arab and Sira literature, which also document significant events and narratives in Islamic history.

The German explorer Heinrich Barth described it as containing "besides a great deal of theological matter, some important historical data" in his journal describing his journey through Sokoto published in 1857. The work was edited and translated to English by Mervyn Hiskett of the School of Oriental and African Studies in 1963. In 1919, Adolph Brass translated the work to German titled Eine neue Quelle zur Geschichte des Fulreiches Sokoto.

=== Diya' al-hukkam ===
Abdullahi composed the work Diya' al-hukkam (The light for governors) in 1806–7, following his departure from the ongoing jihad and his arrival in Kano while en route to Mecca. The full title of this work is Diya' al-hukkam fi-ma lahum wa-'alayhim min al-ahkam. The Kano community pleaded with him to stay and provide guidance and education. During this time, Hausaland, and particularly Kano, faced significant instability, as the various Fulbe clans in the emirate contended for power in the aftermath of the death of Malam Dan Zabuwa, a prominent leader of the jihad. Zabuwa's son, Abdullahi, was considered too young to assume a ruling position, and another candidate, Alkali Usuman, lacked the necessary resources, followers, influence, and, being of Hausa ethnicity, the ethnic status and fluency in Fulfulde, the language of the Fulbe leaders. Additionally, many Hausa residents of Kano viewed Abdullahi with suspicion due to his close association with the Fulbe clans. Suleimanu, who served as the Imam, was chosen by Usman to be the Sarkin Kano, but he lacked significant followers and influence, rendering him politically weak. Restoring political stability to the emirate became a crucial objective during this period as it was the commercial centre of the region. It was within this complex political context that Abdullahi wrote the work Diya' al-hukkam, aiming to provide guidance and counsel on matters of governance and leadership. The work came to be regarded as the "second Kano constitution" by the emirate's ulama.

This book delves into the topic of governance in accordance with Sharia, Islamic law. Abdullahi primarily focuses on hereditary systems of government and emphasises the principles of accountability that those in positions of power should adhere to. The translation of this work into Hausa, titled Hasken Mahukunta, was written by the renowned writer Abubakar Imam in 1966.

=== Diya' al-sultan ===
The full title of this work is Diya' al-sultan wa-ghayrihi min al-ikhwan fi ahamm ma yutlabu 'ilmuhu fi umur al-zaman (A Guide to the Sultan and other Brothers), completed on 19 January 1812 in Bodinga. This work specifically focuses on providing guidance to Muslim rulers and leaders. This work was based on the works of al-Maghili. Within its pages, Abdullahi delves into the potential pitfalls and risks associated with kingship, particularly in the context of succession from father to son. It is likely that Abdullahi's concerns stemmed from his perception that Usman was favoring his son, Bello, as his successor.

In response to Abdullahi's work, Usman penned his own piece titled Najm al-ikhwan in 1813. In this work, Usman countered Abdullahi's viewpoint and argued that it was not in violation of Islamic law for a son to inherit a position of power, as long as the son possesses the necessary qualifications and capabilities for effective leadership.

=== Diya' al-ta'wil ===
The full title of this work is Diya' al-ta'wil fi ma'ani 'l-tanzil (Lights on Interpreting the Meaning of the Given Word). This comprehensive work on Tafsir, consisting of two volumes and 747 folios, gained widespread popularity in West Africa, reaching as far as Mauritania. The first volume was completed on 2 September 1815 in Bodinga or Gwandu and the second on 10 July 1816 in Gwandu. It is regarded as his magnum opus by some scholars. Abdullahi also produced an abridged version titled Kifayat du'afa' al-sudan. In this work, Abdullahi emphasized the importance of al-Shura (consultation) in politics within an Islamic society. According to him, al-Shura is crucial for the efficiency, firmness, and strength of all Muslim governments. It serves as a means to gauge the will of the people and formulate appropriate policies and legislation. Abdullahi argues that a nation that governs through mutual consultation consistently achieves the best results. Therefore, Islamic rulers are obligated to govern based on al-Shura, and failure to do so may necessitate their removal by the Muslims.

=== Bayan al-arkan ===
In this work, completed in 1817, Abdullahi presents a description of the initiation process for a Sufi novice into the Khalwatiyya order. According to his account, the initiation involves seven stages, each corresponding to the seven degrees of the soul recognized by Sufi practitioners. During the initiation, the novice and the Sufi master would sit together in a dimly lit room. The master would then hold the hand of the novice, establishing a physical connection. The master guides the novice to focus on listening to his recitation of dhikr, a form of repetitive remembrance of Allah's names. As the master closes his eyes and repeats the dhikr three times, the novice is encouraged to attentively listen and internalize the spiritual aspects of the remembrance. This was likely the method Mallam Jibril used to initiate Abdullah and Usman into the Sufi orders.

== Sufism ==
Sufism is said to have been introduced to Hausaland by al-Maghili in the late 15th-century. Both Abdullahi and his brother, Usman, dedicated themselves to the study of Sufism from a young age and continued their engagement with Sufi teachings throughout their lives. Abdullahi, in particular, produced numerous writings that explored the interplay between Sufism and Shariah. Under the guidance of his mentor, Jibril ibn Umar, Abdullahi underwent initiation into various Sufi orders, including the Shadhiliyah, Khalwatiya, and Qadiriyah. Among these, the Qadiriyah order gained significant popularity within the Sokoto Caliphate and eventually became the official Sufi order of Sokoto. Abdullahi followed the orthodox Sufism of Abu Hamid al-Ghazali. He also studied works of Ibn Ata Allah al-Iskandari and Abd al-Karim al-Jili.

== Legacy ==
Abdullahi dan Fodio's enduring influence in Hausaland and later Northern Nigeria can be attributed not only to his military achievements but also to his extensive literary contributions. He authored approximately eighty writings, encompassing various poems and books. These writings have retained their relevance over time, particularly among Muslims in Northern Nigeria, who continue to draw inspiration and guidance from his teachings. Many of his poems that were written in Fulfulde are still being sung by women and children in Adamawa and northern Cameroon. Atiku Abubakar, former Vice-President of Nigeria, described him as "...a great intellectual, a general in the jihad campaigns, an administrator whose objective was to establish equity and social justice among people, and a reputed statesman of exemplary character".

Abdullahi's followers were numerous, as evidenced by the listing of 750 individuals by name in Tartib al-ashab. These dedicated supporters hailed from various regions, encompassing Zamfara, Gobir, Agades, Adar, Kassala, Zabarma, Songhai, Massina, Guinea, Garoa and Bornu.

Abdullahi's legacy continued through his descendants, with all subsequent Emirs of Gwandu, tracing their lineage back to him, a tradition that has persisted for over two centuries. The title retains its significance and is the third most important Muslim traditional leader in Nigeria, following only the Sultan of Sokoto and the Shehu of Bornu. Furthermore, his legacy is evident in the contemporary landscape of Nigerian Islamic scholarship. Prominent scholars, such as Shaikh Nasiru Kabara, claim connection to Abdullahi through their teachers, who were either directly taught by Abdullahi or were students of his disciples.According to Shaikh Abubakar Gumi, because of the teachings and guidance of Abdullahi, Gwandu remains the most Sunnah oriented emirate in Nigeria. His tomb in Gwandu stands as a significant historical site and draws numerous visitors.
