= Gwandu Emirate =

Co-capital of the Sokoto Caliphate

Gwandu Emirate: Jihar Gwandu (Hausa); إمارة ﻏﻨﺪو
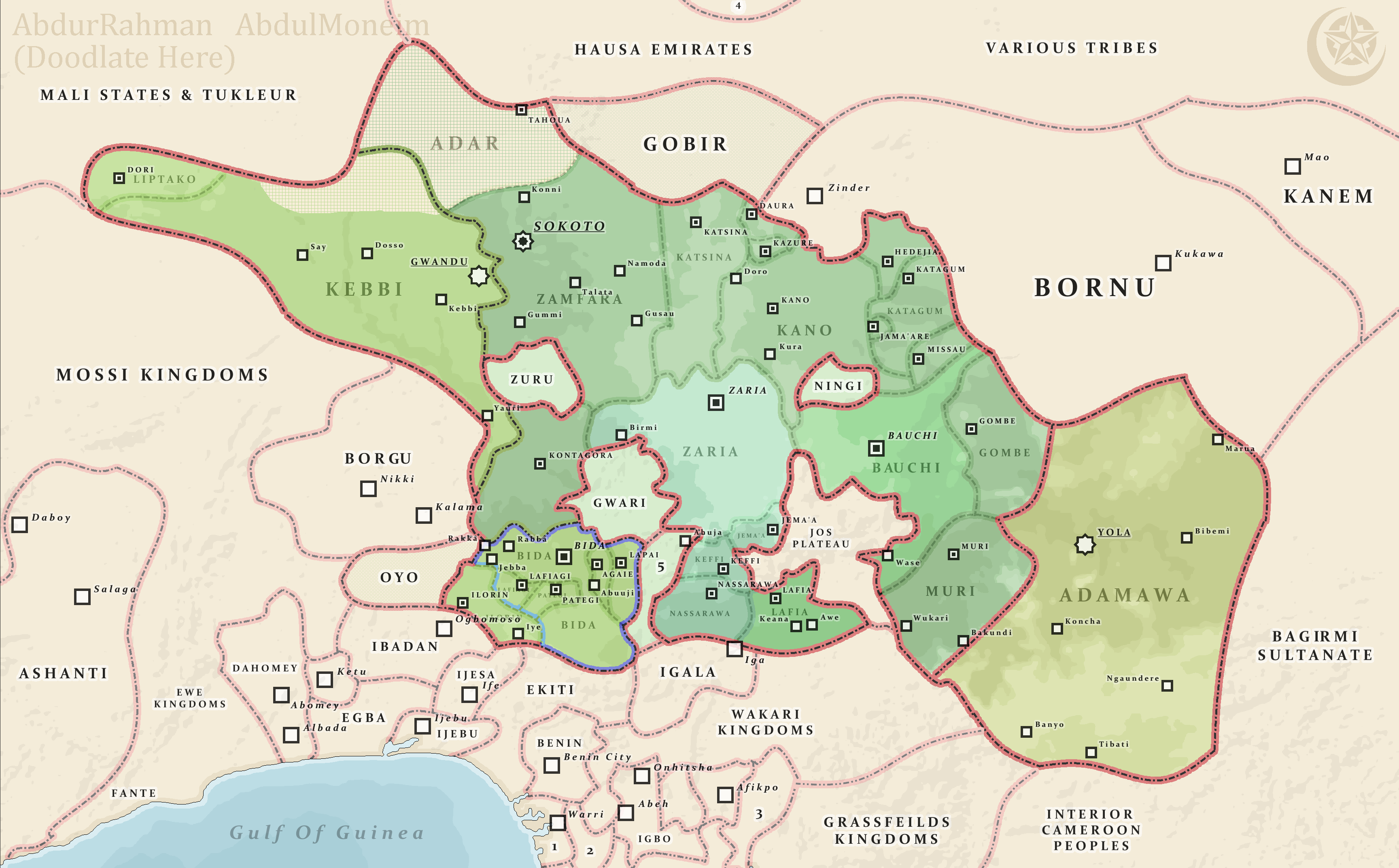
- Map of the Sokoto Caliphate in 1870. Its western and southern territories were supervised by Gwandu.
- Status: Co-capital of the Sokoto Caliphate (1807–1903); Currently non-sovereign monarchy within Nigeria
- Capital: Gwandu (1807–1811, 1817–1860, 1876–1906); Bodinga (1811–1817); Ambursa (1860–1876); Birnin-Kebbi (1906–)
- Common languages: Arabic (official); Fulfulde; Hausa
- Religion: Sunni Islam
- Government: Sarauta-Emirate
- Emir
  - 1812–1828: Abdullahi dan Fodio (first)
  - 1898–1903: Bayero Aliyu (last sovereign)
  - 2005–present: Muhammadu Iliyasu Bashir
- Legislature: Gwandu Emirate Council

Establishment
  - Co-capital of the Sokoto Caliphate: 1807
  - Native Authority under British colonial rule: 1903
  - Native Authority within the Nigerian First Republic: 1960
  - Non-sovereign monarchy in Nigeria: 1966
Preceded by
Kingdom of Kebbi
- Today part of: Kebbi State, Nigeria; Burkina Faso; Niger

The Emirate of Gwandu (Arabic: إمارة ﻏﻨﺪو), sometimes referred to as the Gwandu Caliphate or simply Gwandu, was one of the two political centers of the Sokoto Caliphate. Established in 1805 during the Sokoto jihad, it served as the administrative base for the caliphate's western and southern territories, while the eastern and northern domains were governed from Sokoto. This arrangement has led some scholars to describe the Caliphate as a 'dual empire'. Although the emirs of Gwandu were subordinate to the caliph, they were traditionally autonomous. The territory under Gwandu extended as far west as Dori (in present-day Burkina Faso) and south beyond Ilorin.

Throughout the 19th century, Gwandu was engaged in a series of protracted military conflicts with Kebbi and its successor state Argungu. Remembered as the Kebbi Wars, these conflict shaped much of its political and military history. Following the British conquest of the Sokoto Caliphate in 1903, Gwandu became part of the Sokoto Province under colonial indirect rule.

In independent Nigeria, the emirate lost its political sovereignty but has remained an important traditional authority. Today it is the largest emirate in Kebbi State, covering ten local government areas, including the state capital Birnin Kebbi. Its emir remains an important Muslim traditional leader in Nigeria, only behind the Sultan of Sokoto and the Shehu of Borno.

== History ==
=== Sokoto jihad and establishment ===
Following the fall of the capital of the Kebbi Kingdom, Birnin Kebbi, to the Sokoto jihadists in 1805, they moved to the Kebbi town of Gwandu as their main base. At the time, it was a small, unfortified settlement established by the 16th-century Kebbi founder Kanta Kotal and used as a royal farm (gandu) by his successors. The settlement was surrounded by rich, fertile lands, which attracted Fulani pastoralists who found the area suitable for grazing. Its location in a valley with surrounding ridges made it a defensible stronghold against attacks.

Soon after their move to Gwandu in late 1805, the jihadists were attacked by a combined alliance led by Gobir and Kebbi, including the ousted Sarkin Kebbi Muhammadu Hodi. The two armies met at Alwassa, which ended in a disastrous defeat for the jihadists, who narrowly retreated to the naturally protected Gwandu, where they mounted a desperate defense over the course of five days, ultimately defeating and routing the alliance forces. Shortly after the Alwassa–Gwandu campaign, jihadist commander Muhammad Bello built walls around the town for better defense.

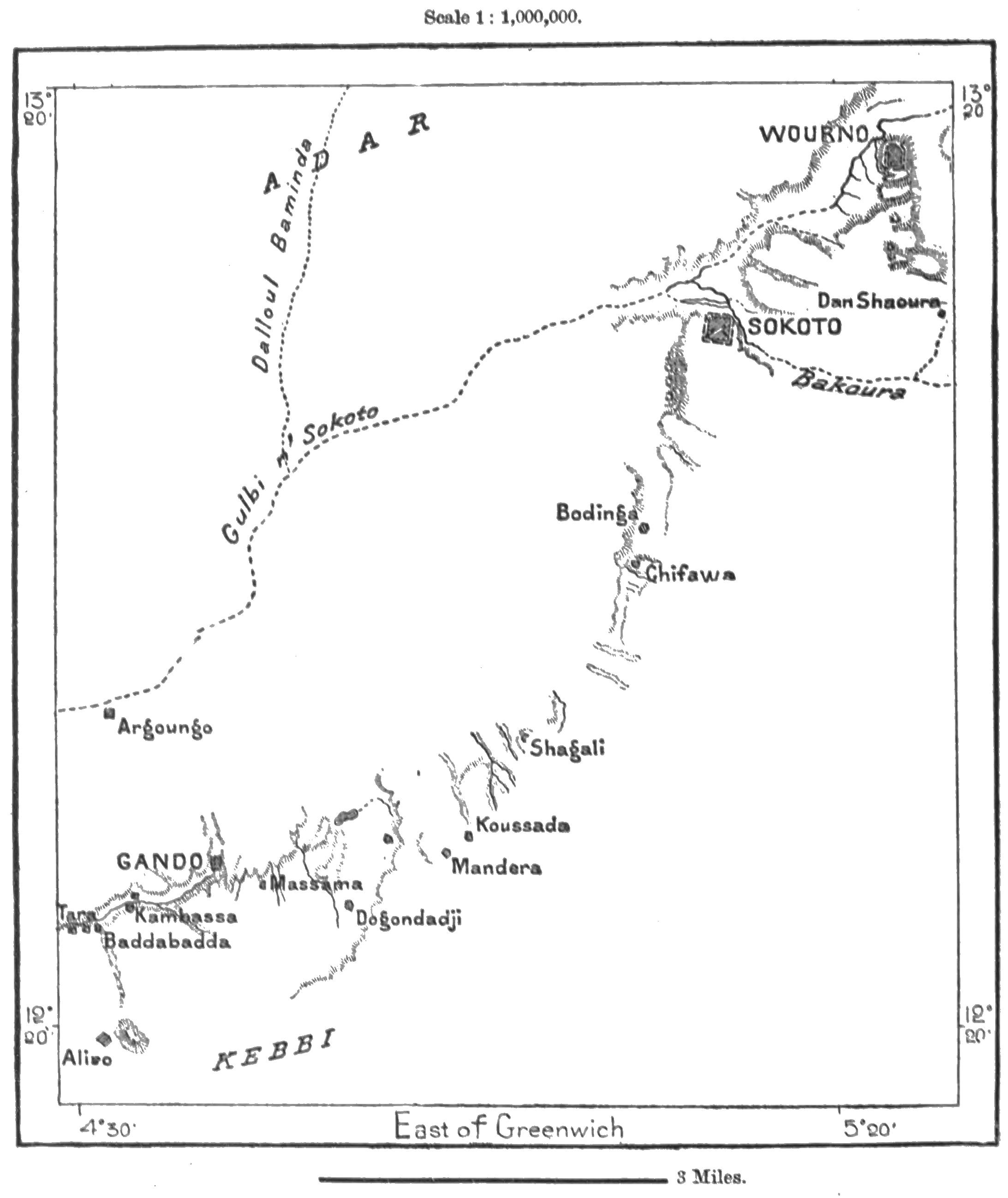
Map showing the major settlements around the Sokoto River

After Usman dan Fodio's jihad ended in 1808 with the fall of the Gobir capital Alkalawa, he moved with most of his followers to Sifawa, leaving his brother and wazir Abdullahi to continue the fighting westward. Abdullahi expanded into Gurma territory, occupying the provinces of Dandi, Kamba, and Zaberma, thereby extending the newly established Sokoto Caliphate's reach to the Niger River in the southwest. By 1812, Amir al-Mu’'minin ('Commander of the faithful') Usman had divided authority in the Caliphate among his top commanders. The eastern emirates fell under Muhammad Bello in Sokoto, the western territories under Abdullahi in Gwandu, the north under Ali Jedo, and the south was divided between Muhammad Bukhari and Abd al-Salam. At the time of the division, the western territories included the Niger valley down to Nupe and extended as far west as Dendi. They later expanded to include Ilorin in the south and Liptako in the west. It is possible that Abdullahi expected to extend farther west to include Masina, but a separate caliphate was later declared there under Ahmadu Lobbo.

So that he would be close to Usman, Abdullahi supervised the territories from Bodinga, a small settlement near Sifawa. After Usman's death in 1817, Abdullahi rode to Sokoto expecting to organise the funeral and oversee the election of a new Amir al-Mu'minin, possibly himself. However, on his arrival he found the gates closed and was turned back. Abdullahi had long been disillusioned with the way the jihad was carried out, believing the focus had shifted from religious reform to material pursuits. Hence, he became increasingly isolated from the other Sokoto leaders, including his brother Usman and nephew Bello. This episode further strained Abdullahi's relations with Sokoto, and he refused to recognise the newly appointed Caliph Bello as Amir al-Mu'minin.

=== Consolidation ===
Not long after Usman's death, a wave of revolts erupted in the Caliphate. The Kebbawa under Muhammad Hodi were never subdued and continued their resistance against Gwandu and Sokoto. The most significant, however, was that of Abd al-Salam, an important Ba-Are scholar who had been one of the leading commanders in the jihad but renounced his allegiance after he felt cheated by the division of fiefs. He was defeated by Caliph Bello in 1818 and his revolt quashed, but some of his followers gathered at the town of Kalambaina, located about three miles southeast of Gwandu. They eventually rebelled and held out for several years against a Gwandu siege until around 1821, when a combined army led by Bello succeeded in quelling the rebellion.

With the victory secured, the two leaders were said to have reconciled, with Abdullahi officially recognising Bello as Amir al-Mu'minin, and Bello in turn recognising Abdullahi as Emir of Gwandu. Henceforth, Sokoto and Gwandu became the twin capitals of the Caliphate, with Sokoto serving as the metropolitan center for the eastern territories and Gwandu for the west.

At Gwandu, Abdullahi built a community of scholars, poets, and Sufis who composed and memorised works of scholarship. In this way, under Abdullahi and his successors, the western territories emphasised scholarship rather than the politics that characterised Sokoto in the east. From 1817, Abdullahi left most of the military campaigning and administration to his son Muhammad Wani, who based himself at Birnin Kebbi. When Nupe and Ilorin came under Gwandu's authority, his nephew Muhammad Bukhari, also a noted poet, was responsible for their management. Historian Murray Last suggests this possibly made Gwandu "a kind of 'alternative' polity, deliberately distant from the post-jihad marketplace."

When Abdullahi died in 1829, he was succeeded by his eldest son Muhammad Wani. During his reign, the Kebbawa rebels remained a persistent threat. From their center at Argungu, and under the leadership of Sarkin Kebbi Karari, they waged armed resistance against Sokoto and Gwandu with support from the Zabermawa and Arewa. In 1831, a combined Sokoto–Gwandu force besieged Argungu, and its inhabitants eventually capitulated, expelling Karari and his followers. Karari was pursued and killed shortly afterward. He was said to have been found by Gwandu forces seated on his shield in the posture of prayer. His son Yakubu Nabame escaped capture but later surrendered, and was banished to Sokoto where he lived under the Caliph's supervision. Karari's death effectively suspended the Kebbawa-led resistance movement against the Caliphate.

=== Period of 'peace' ===
Wani was succeeded by his younger brother Ibrahim Khalilu in 1833. He reigned for a quarter of a century, much of it involving a series of military expeditions. He first set out to end the threat posed by Borgu to the southwest, whose forces had attacked Kaoje, an important town famed for its horses. The battle was a disaster for the Gwandu forces, who were led by Muhammad Sambo, but they eventually regrouped and succeeded in driving the Borgawa out of Kaoje. Among those killed was Abdullahi's youngest son, Isiaku.

Around 1836, a combined Borgu–Oyo force invaded Ilorin, which had been in conflict with the Oyo Empire since its establishment earlier in the century. The Emir of Ilorin, Abd al-Salam, appealed to Gwandu for reinforcements against the alliance. Consequently, a combined Sokoto and Gwandu force, led by Muhammad Bukhari and Sambo respectively, was sent to defend the city. The attackers nearly routed the Caliphate's forces, but after the death of the leading Borgu commander Sero Kpera, morale collapsed. Ilorin was able to repulse the attack and successfully defended its capital.

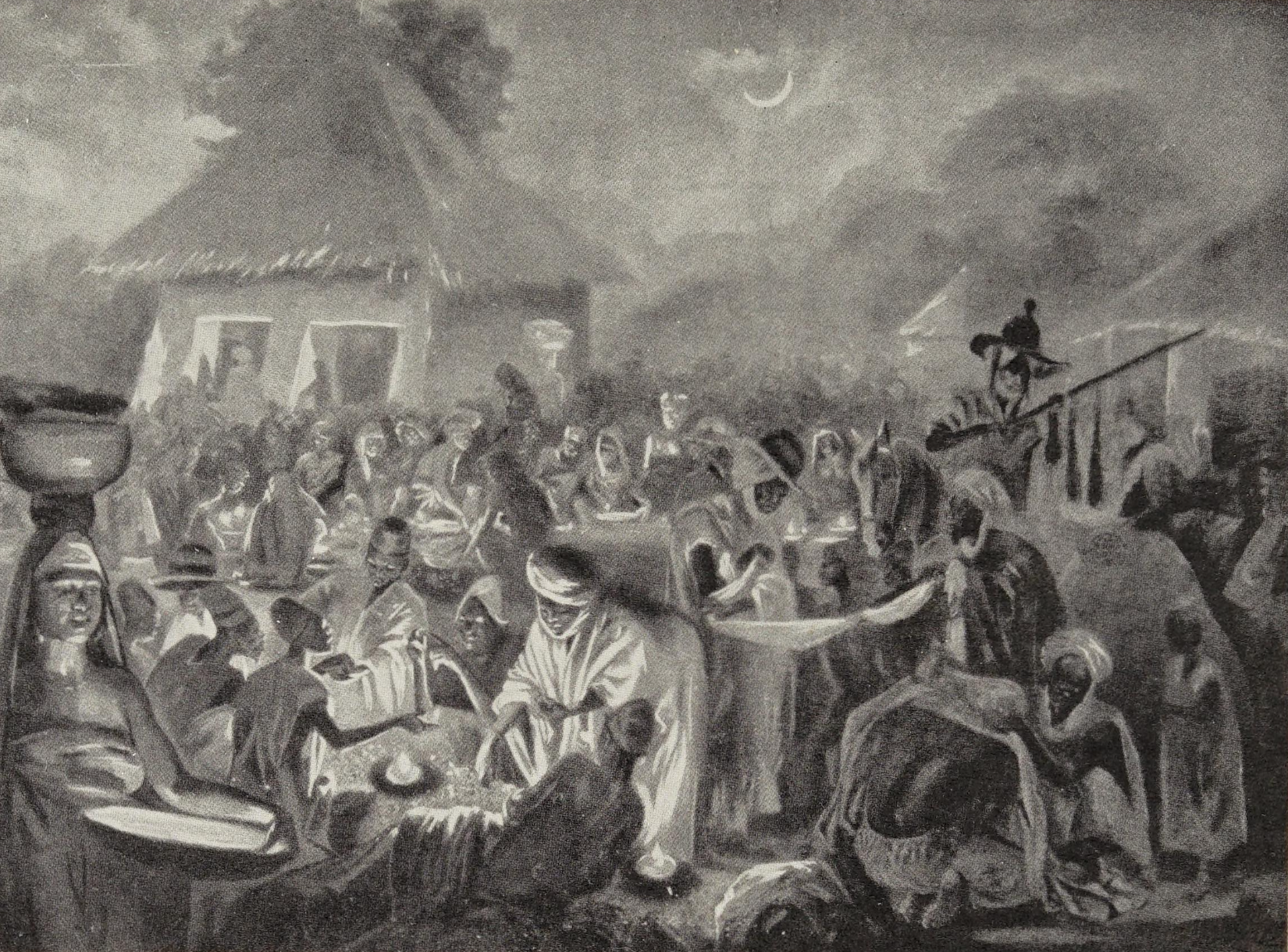
Depiction of a night market in Bida by illustrator Carl Arriens From the 1850s, the Nupe Emirate, under Gwandu supervision, experienced considerable economic growth, partly due to its slave plantations. Its markets also gained fame for the skill of their artisans.

In 1841, Emir of Bida Usman Zaki was chased out of his capital by his brother Masaba, who rebelled alongside some princes from the old Nupe dynasty. Upon receiving the news, Khalilu rode to Rabba to resolve the crisis. Following discussions, Emir Khalilu appointed Masaba as emir, removed Zaki, and returned with him to Gwandu. Two years later, Masaba himself was forced from his capital by one of his commanders, Umaru Bahaushe, who usurped the throne. It took until 1856 for Gwandu to overthrow Bahaushe. Khalilu then reinstated Usman Zaki as emir shortly afterward.

Sarkin Kebbi Karari's death had ended military confrontations between the Kebbawa and Gwandu. This period of relative peace, lasting between 1831 and 1849, improved Gwandu's economic position through the tributes it exacted from the Kebbawa. However, hostilities eventually returned after the Kebbawa accused Gwandu authorities, particularly certain princes and agents, of abuses and excesses. These officials extracted unofficial tribute, often sporadically, seizing grain and animals and, at times, enslaving children and citizens. The failure of Gwandu authorities to curb these abuses contributed to deep resentment among the Kebbawa.

Meanwhile, the Ba-Kebbi prince Yakubu Nabame, during his exile in Sokoto, became a noted commander in the Caliphate army and was eventually granted his freedom by Caliph Aliyu Babba. In 1849, however, he renounced his allegiance to the Caliphate and adopted the title of Sarkin Kebbi. Centered at Argungu, he led a powerful resistance movement consisting mainly of Kebbawa, the Arewa, and Zabermawa against the Caliphate.

=== Kebbi Wars ===
Around the same time, Khalilu seems to have withdrawn from military and administrative matters. When German explorer Heinrich Barth visited Gwandu in 1853, he found Khalilu "a man without energy," who "lived in a state of the greatest seclusion, well fitted for a monk but by no means suited to the ruler of a vast empire." Khalilu died in 1858 and was succeeded by his brother Haliru. The new emir immediately set out to respond to the Argungu revolt. His first campaign was successful, but was killed on his second at Tilli in 1860. He was succeeded by his brother Aliyu, who moved the capital to Ambursa some months after his appointment. This move allowed Aliyu to better protect the towns situated on the south bank of the River Kebbi, which were vulnerable to Kebbawa attack. Throughout his reign, Aliyu fought with the Kebbawa until his death in 1864.

Abdulkadiri, another of Abdullahi's sons, succeeded as emir. To end hostilities with the Kebbawa, he agreed to a peace treaty in 1868. The treaty, negotiated by Caliph Ahmadu Rufai, is remembered as Lafiyar Toga ("the peace of Toga"), after the Argungu ruler Sarkin Kebbi Abdullahi Toga. While on his way to Bida, Abdulkadiri died in 1868. He was succeeded by al-Mustafa, a son of Emir Muhammad Wani.

In 1873, the inhabitants of the Kebbi town of Fanna sent a deputation to al-Mustafa, requesting to join his emirate, which he accepted. This was viewed by Argungu as a breach of the Lafiyar Toga treaty. Acting on orders from Argungu, the chief of Fanna reportedly seized as many as ten thousand cattle from the local Fulani in his district and Giru. Al-Mustafa then marched on Giru but was unable to capture it. He called on reinforcements from Bida but died before they arrived. His successor Hanafi attacked Giru with the Nupe army's support. In response, Abdullahi Toga attacked Ambursa during the emir's absence. Led by Sarkin Kalgo Abdulkadiri, the Gwandu capital was successfully defended and the Kebbawa were driven off. Hanafi eventually captured Giru after a four-month siege. The Giru War ended the eight-year Lafiyar Toga treaty, with hostilities continuing until the end of the century, when British troops occupied the emirate.

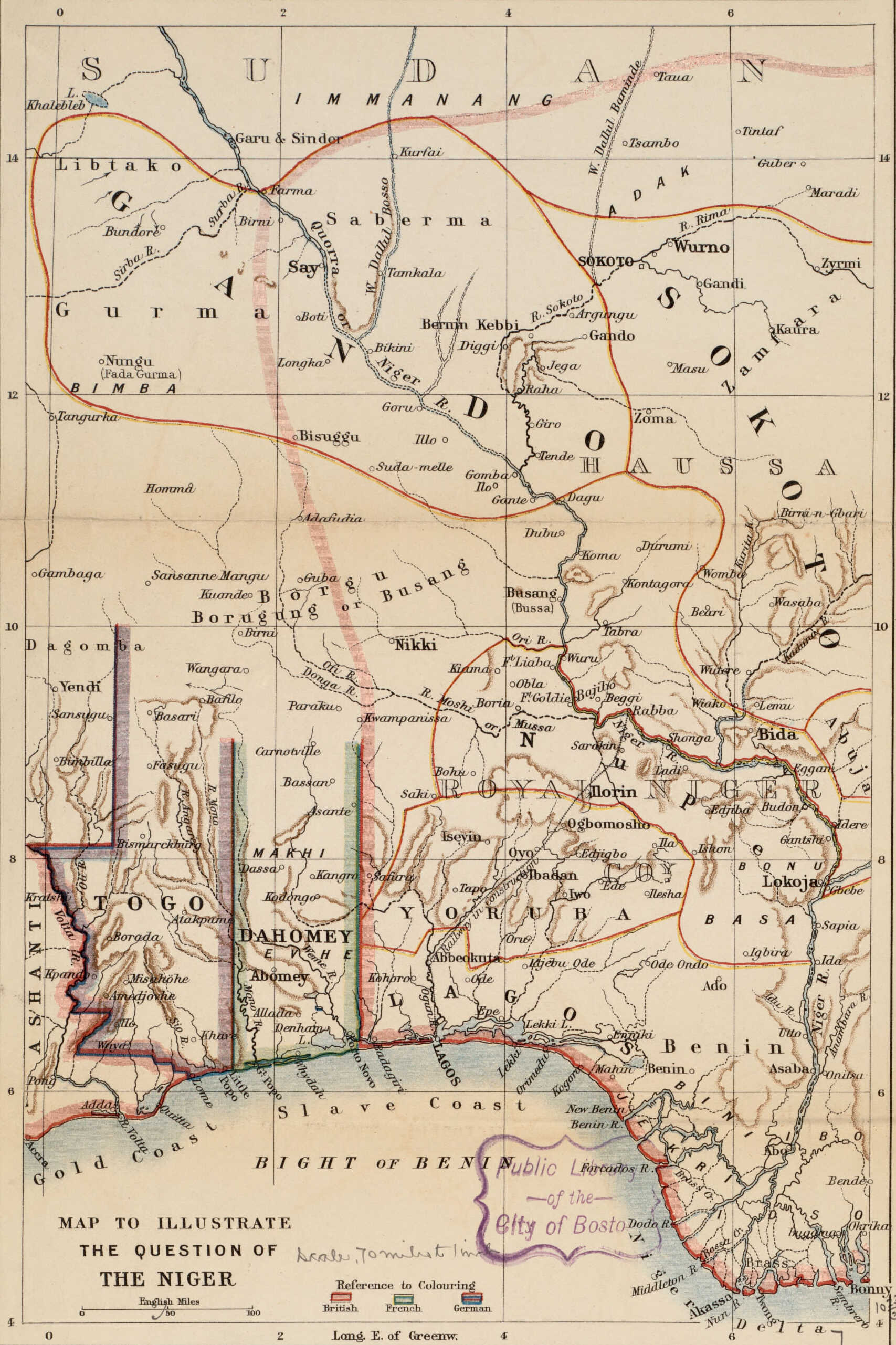
1898 map of Gwandu (labelled GANDO) and surrounding polities

On Hanafi's death in 1876, he was succeeded by Maliki. A year into his reign, the Kebbawa again attacked Ambursa and captured thirty guns. After this, Maliki moved the capital back to Gwandu. In 1885, the Royal Niger Company (RNC) signed a treaty with Gwandu. Maliki was succeeded by Umaru Bakatara in 1888. During Bakatara's reign, he was visited in Gwandu by British officials George Goldie and William Wallace, who brought gifts from the RNC. Two of his chiefs, Haliru of Kalgo and Haliru of Raka, led several expeditions against the Kebbawa, "with varying degrees of success."

From 1887 to 1891, Gwandu suffered a catastrophic rinderpest epidemic, remembered simply as sannu, from the Hausa expression of condolence. According to modern accounts, the majority of the bovine population was wiped out, forcing Fulani pastoralists to turn to farming. Today, the area has relatively low numbers of pastoral Fulani, partly because of the epidemic. A likely cause of the epidemic's severity was the widespread insecurity of the Kebbi wars, which restricted cattle movement. Their confinement within villages left them emaciated and vulnerable.

=== Modern history ===
==== British occupation ====
Umaru Bakatara was succeeded by Abdullahi Bayero, who reigned for only a year before his death. He was followed by Bayero Aliyu, another grandson of Abdullahi dan Fodio. When British troops invaded the emirate in 1903, Gwandu offered no physical resistance.

There are a variety of possible explanations for Gwandu's non-resistance, including its relations with Argungu, the manner in which the British subdued other emirates, and Gwandu's prior experience of British aggression before the final invasion. The nearly century-long Kebbi wars had ravaged the region and greatly weakened Gwandu, especially during the reign of Sarkin Kebbi Samaila III (1883–1915), whose skill in guerrilla warfare was so effective that he was said to have captured more than ninety towns and villages. Both Gwandu and Argungu were so preoccupied with the wars that they paid little attention to the growing British threat until it was too late. Even by 1898, the rulers of Argungu "were inclined" to view the Europeans as allies against their common enemies, Gwandu and Sokoto.

In the late 19th century, Gwandu had maintained diplomatic relations with the British through the RNC. It also had a history of military confrontations with them, especially after 1897, when they first invaded the southern emirates of Bida and Ilorin. Consequently, Gwandu and Sokoto stopped accepting the yearly jizya that the RNC had been paying since 1885. Soon after the attack on Bida, the French established military posts at Bussa, Yagha, Botu, Karimama, Illo, and Gwamba. In response, the RNC reconciled with Gwandu and Sokoto, allying with them against the French. The French threat was neutralised in 1898 with the killing of Marius-Gabriel Cazemajou, the leader of the French expedition in the region.

With France no longer a serious danger, Gwandu and Sokoto again turned their attention to the British. Under the pretext of protecting the Caliphate, the RNC attempted to station a garrison at the important Gwandu town of Jega, but was "forcefully rebuffed" by Sokoto. However, they were able to establish garrisons in Borgu and Yauri, an independent kingdom with treaty relations with Gwandu. The establishment of these garrisons, and the British message to the Caliph at Sokoto declaring that refusal to host a Jega garrison was an act of enmity, permanently ruptured relations between the RNC and Gwandu. Later in 1898, the RNC established another post at Illo, but it was soon abandoned after its inhabitants killed two British officers and the mercenaries manning the garrison.

When Frederick Lugard issued his "Protectorate Proclamation," establishing the Northern Nigeria Protectorate in 1900, he sent an Arabic translation to Emir Bayero Aliyu. When Lugard's messenger brought the proclamation to Gwandu, he was told there was no need to reply after Lugard had seized some of Gwandu's territory. Between 1900 and September 1901, the British protectorate had occupied the emirates of Bida, Kontagora, Yola, Muri, Bauchi, Gombe, Zaria, and Kano, deposing their rulers. In the immediate hinterland of Gwandu town, the British, stationed at Illo, attacked and burned the towns of Raha and Kalgo in March 1901. Throughout, Emir Bayero Aliyu took no punitive measures against the British post at Illo. When they planned a second attack on Kalgo, its chief, Haliru, invited the post's commander to pay a friendly visit, and warmly received him.

Another likely reason for Gwandu's non-resistance was that its ruler, Bayero Aliyu, was already an old and sick man "occupied with winning paradise in the next world." Lugard's repeated assurances to the Caliphate's emirs that he would retain the ruling dynasties and allow them to continue their religious duties with little or no change also contributed to Gwandu's decision to accept British rule. On their way to Sokoto, the British occupied Gwandu, which capitulated on 12 March 1903, a few months before the final fall of the Caliphate at Burmi in July 1903.

==== Early years of colonial Indirect rule ====
Emir Bayero Aliyu died soon after the British occupation. Dan Galadima Muhammad Aliyu was immediately installed as emir on 18 May 1903, supervised by the colonial Resident of the newly established Sokoto Province, Alder Burdon. The province comprised Sokoto, Gwandu, and Argungu emirates. Soon after his appointment, he fell out with the British after naming his own Dan Galadima without Resident Burdon's "sanction". Relations worsened as "he continued to behave like the traditional Emir of the pre-British era," frustrating the Residents. He later became openly hostile to the administration, described as "a hopeless case; old and intelligent, under the influence of evil councillors." By October 1905, British officials in the province had recommended his deposition to High Commissioner Lugard.

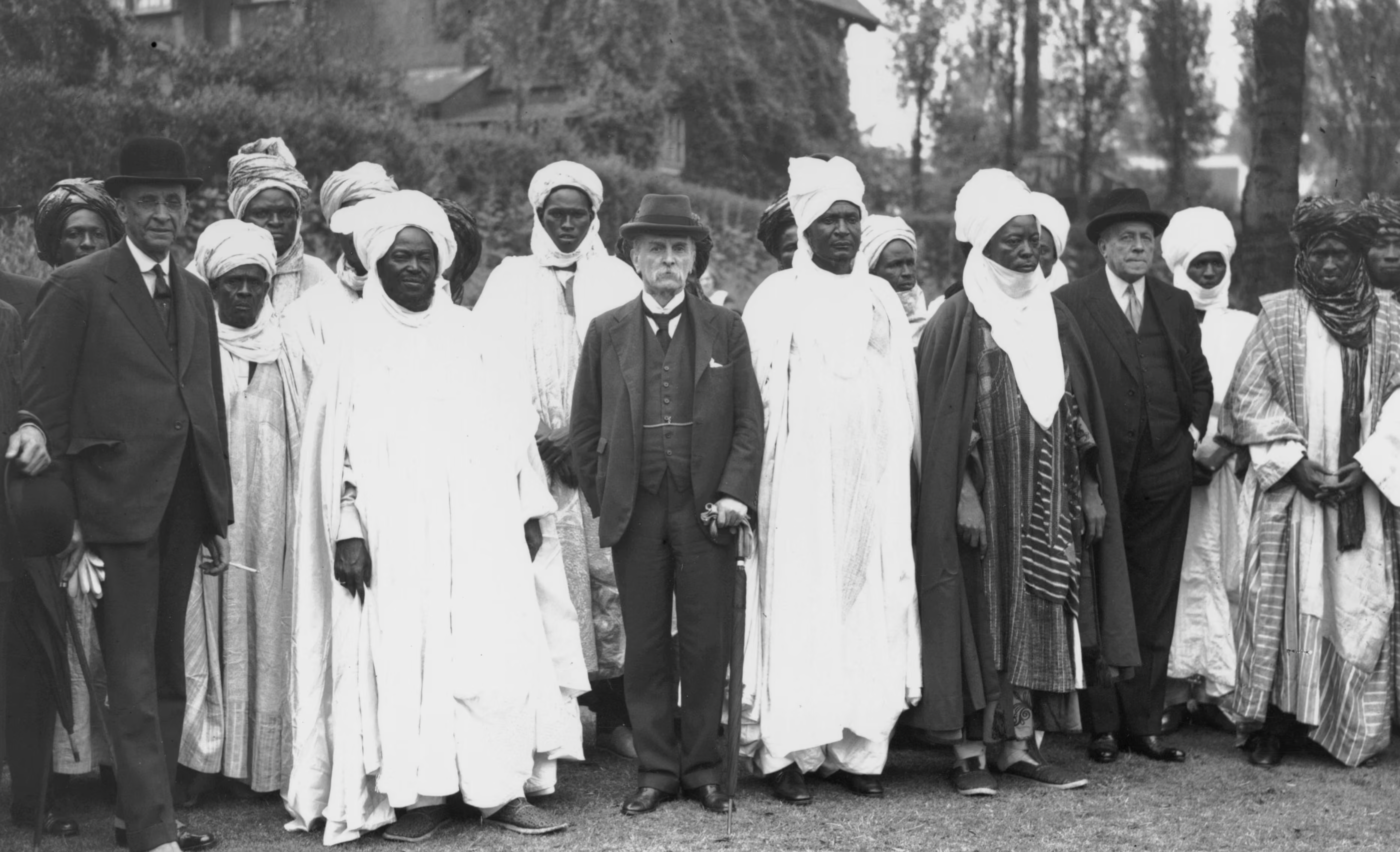
Emir of Gwandu Usman (centre), with Frederick Lugard on his right, together with the Sultan of Sokoto and the Emir of Kano at the London Zoo (1934)

When Emir Muhammad was deposed in early 1906, immediately after the Satiru Revolt, the British had already prepared for months. When the revolt broke out in February, the rebels contacted him, and he apparently promised cooperation if the Sultan supported them. However, Sultan Attahiru II helped to crush the rebellion, while Muhammad contributed some of his troops. After Satiru was destroyed on 10 March, the British marched to Gwandu to depose the emir as earlier planned. On reaching the town, the British troops took square formation and summoned the emir to come out of his compound. Acting Resident Goldsmith argued that this show of force was necessary, as the emir was likely to resist violently, stating that Muhammad "had made public to his followers that he was an old man now and valued his life of little account and his one ambition before he died was to kill a white man."

After his deposition, Muhammad had to be forcibly placed on his horse when he refused to be taken to the protectorate's capital, Zungeru, declaring that "he would rather die." His arrest appeared unpopular in Gwandu, with Goldsmith remarking that he "thought at one time that the men of the town would be encouraged on by the women to attempt his rescue." However, this never came, and Muhammad was banished to Zungeru without major interference. On 21 March, a day after Muhammad's arrest, the British appointed Haliru, chief of Kalgo, as emir. His appointment undermined Gwandu's succession tradition. Previously, the Dan Galadima had always succeeded the emir. Nor was Haliru eligible, as neither his father nor grandfather had ever reigned. His installation was so unpopular that the British moved the capital from Gwandu to Birnin Kebbi. There were no violent protests, largely due to fear of reprisals after the aggressive British repression of the Satiru rebels.

Haliru died on 21 March 1915. On 16 April, his son Basharu was appointed to succeed him. This again undermined succession tradition of the automatic appointment of the Dan Galadima, then Haliru of Raha, son of Umar Bakatara. Immediately after the announcement, the chief Qadi of Birnin Kebbi protested to the District Officer, arguing it would be "impossible to work under Basharu." The next day, the Dan Galadima himself complained, offering to resign and "retire into private life."

In the morning of 19 April, a violent protest broke out in Birnin Kebbi against Basharu's appointment, led by the Magajin Gari of Gwandu, Bukhari na Malam. According to official records, the crowd numbered over 1,000 but was likely much larger. They blocked the road to the residency to prevent Basharu's installation. The crowd dispersed only after the District Officer threatened to call in the stationed British garrison to "deal ruthlessly with them." Despite this, the installation problem remained. The District Officer, Liddard, appealed to various officials to accept Basharu, including the Magajin Gari, Ubandoma, Mayaki, Dan Uwa, Bagudu, and the Magajin Gari's brothers. He also met with Dan Galadima Haliru, "virtually begging" him to accept the appointment. The crisis was resolved only on 28 April, when Resident E J Arnett held a peace meeting with Haliru and Basharu. The new emir was installed the next day.

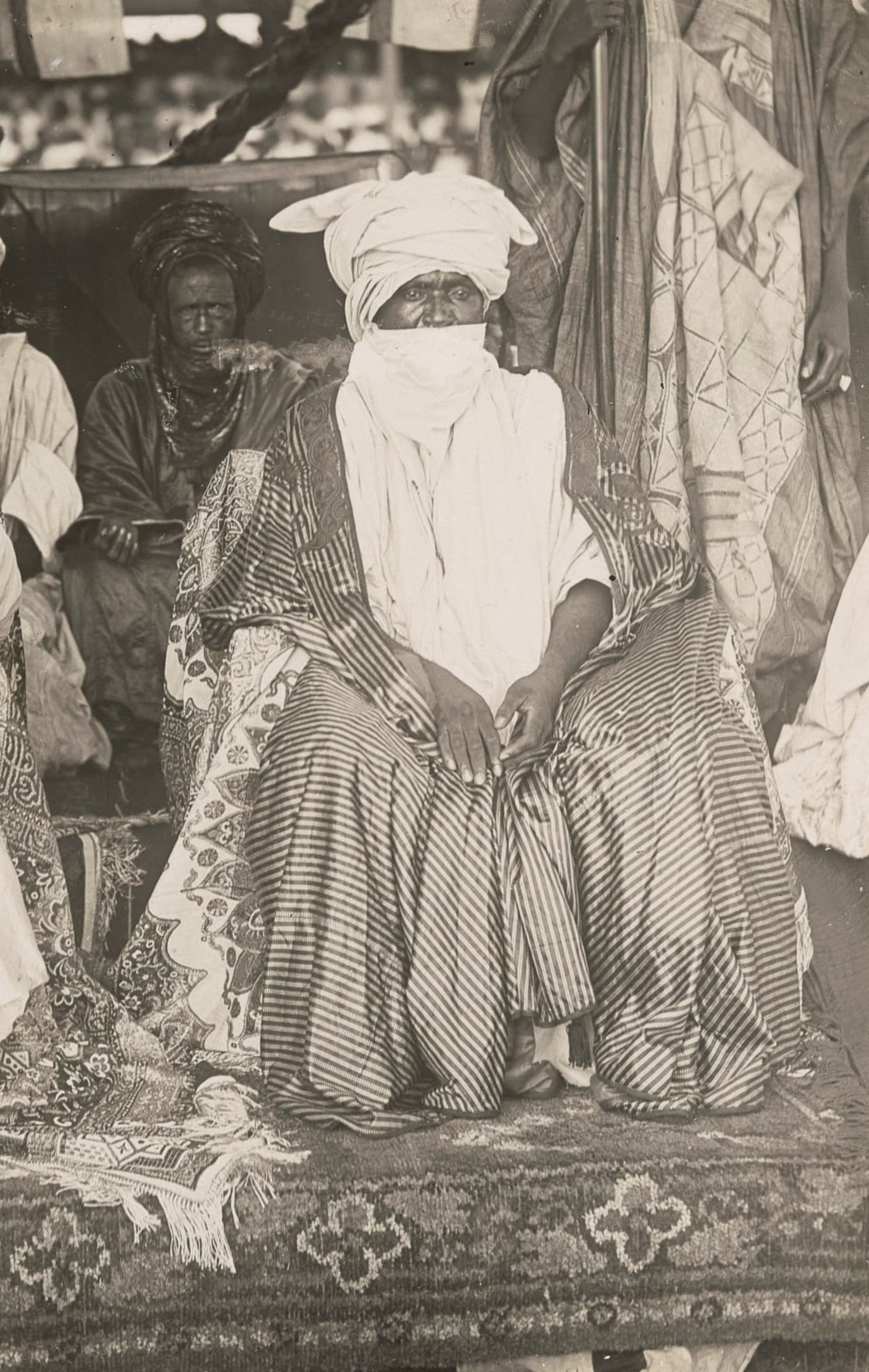
16th Emir of Gwandu Usman b. Haliru II (reigned: 1918–1938)

With Emir Basharu successfully installed, the British took steps to avoid future crises. In 1916, a year after, they deposed Magajin Gari Bukhari, alleging he was obstructing Basharu's administration. When Dan Galadima Haliru died in 1918, the title was abolished. On Basharu's death later that year, his brother Usman was appointed by Resident Arnett, despite opposition from the kingmakers. Apart from a Mahdist unrest in Besse in 1923, Usman's reign was largely uneventful.

==== Zamanin Siyasa and Nigerian First Republic ====
On Usman's death in 1938, he was succeeded by his brother, Yahaya. Yahaya gained a reputation for his piety and reformist zeal and is remembered for his "wisdom, selfless devotion and unlimited integrity". As Emir, he became an advocate for reform, fighting official corruption and pressing for measures such as the 1953 Customary Presents Order to regulate the conduct of Native Authority officials. He was also active in convincing other emirs to accept the appointment of ministers in Northern Nigeria. Remembered as one of the "progressive emirs" of the period, his reputation for adalci (righteousness) had earned some fame beyond Northern Nigeria. He was knighted during his reign, becoming Sir Yahaya.

Yahaya was succeeded by Haruna Rasheed, a son of Emir Basharu, in 1954. His reign coincided with the zamanin siyasa ("era of politics") of the 1950s, when the colonial administration experienced widespread reforms and increased democratisation, mostly due to pressure from western-educated elites. Under these reforms, emirs no longer monopolised Native Authority administration but were integrated into new regional structures. Legislative and representative institutions were introduced at both regional and local levels, which reduced power of the Emir and his officials, whose decisions increasingly had to coexist with elected representatives in local government councils. In 1958, Emir Haruna became President of the Northern Regional House of Chiefs, the upper chamber under the region's new bi-cameral system. Umaru Gwandu, another member of the Gwandu ruling house, was elected Speaker of the regional lower chamber, the House of Assembly in 1959. Both held their positions until the military coup of January 1966.

==== Military governments and return to democracy ====
With the end of Nigeria's First Republic in 1966 and the ushering in of military governments, further reforms to the emirate system followed. In 1967, military head of state Yakubu Gowon restructured the country into federal units, with the Gwandu Emirate falling under the newly created North-Western State. The 1976 Local Government Reforms marked the most decisive break with the colonial-era system. Native Authorities were abolished, replaced with elected local governments with defined boundaries, budgets, and responsibilities. Emirs were excluded from direct administrative functions and confined to advisory roles within newly constituted councils of chiefs. Though the Gwandu Emirate was stripped of formal political power, it remained influential in cultural and religious matters and continued to serve as an intermediary between communities and state authorities.

After over forty-years as Emir, Haruna died in July 1995, and was succeeded by his son Mustapha Jokolo. At that time, Jokolo had retired after a lengthy career in the Nigerian Army, at one time serving as Aide-de-Camp to Shehu Yar'Adua in the 1970s and Muhammadu Buhari during his military dictatorship in the 1980s. In June 2005, Emir Jokolo confronted President Olusegun Obasanjo and accused him of unfairly marginalising Muslims. The president's office then reportedly called Kebbi State Governor, Adamu Aliero, and insisted on the emir's deposition. By mid June, Jokolo was deposed, replaced by his cousin Muhammad Ilyasu-Bashar. At the time of his appointment, Ilyasu-Bashar was a retired general who twice served as military governor of the defunct Gongola State.

== Territory ==
With Usman dan Fodio's division of authority in 1812, Gwandu, under Abdullahi, was responsible for supervising the western and southern quarters of the Sokoto Caliphate. At its height, the polity extended as far as Dori (now in Burkina Faso) and south beyond Ilorin in Yorubaland. At the turn of the 20th century, the territories under Gwandu were apportioned between France, Germany and Britain, with much of it falling under French West Africa. Under British colonial rule, the emirate was incorporated into the Sokoto Province, alongside Sokoto and Argungu emirates.

When Kebbi State was created in 1991 out of Sokoto State, the Gwandu Emirate became the state's largest traditional state. Of Kebbi's 21 Local Government Areas (LGA), ten fall under the Gwandu Emirate followed by Argungu and Zuru's four each, and Yauri's three. The ten LGAs under Gwandu are namely: Birnin-Kebbi, Kalgo, Gwandu, Bunza, Jega, Aliero, Bagudo, Suru, Maiyama and Koko-Besse.

== Government ==
Much of Gwandu's statecraft was shaped by Abdullahi's vision of an ideal Islamic state. He admired the early orthodox caliphs, when knowledge and piety were prioritised in official appointments. Concerning succession, Abdullahi's preference for age and seniority became the norm in Gwandu, unlike in Sokoto where younger brothers could also compete. By appointing Muhammad Wani as the effective administrator of Gwandu, he ensured his eldest son would be the undisputed successor. This practice continued under subsequent emirs, who generally designated the most senior eligible prince as Dan Galadima (the heir apparent). The title, of Hausa origin, had earlier been used in 18th-century Kebbi. In Gwandu, the Dan Galadima was also responsible for leading the army in battle, even when the emir himself was present.

The appointment of an Emir of Gwandu was not official until it was confirmed by the Caliph. The Caliph either visited Gwandu or sent a representative with a letter of appointment and a set of insignia of office, which included a riga (robe), al-kibba (cloak), and rawani (turban). However, this confirmation was largely ceremonial due to Gwandu's succession rules. Since the Dan Galadima automatically succeeded, whoever appointed the Dan Galadima effectively appointed the emir. This system allowed Gwandu to prevent Sokoto's interference in its internal affairs.Another possible reason for this succession tradition was the need for stable leadership in the face of the Kebbawa danger.

Gwandu had relatively few titled officials, with administrative decisions made by a "council of elders". This council may have resembled the Batu mawdo (great council) of Ahmad Lobbo in Hamdullahi, which was composed mostly of legal scholars and Fulani clan leaders. Discussions and appointments were conducted in a secluded inner council. The exact composition of the council is uncertain, but those most often mentioned as electors included the Magajin Gari, Sarkin Dendi, Zogirma, Sarkin Aliero, and the Qadi. Over time, other leaders of powerful groups were added, such as the Sarkin Kebbi of Jega, who maintained an important cavalry contingent within the Gwandu army. The rulers of Jega were descendants of the jihadist leader and later rebel Abd al-Salam. After Abd al-Salam's death, Abdullahi his son to establish the town. By the late 19th century, Jega had become a major market centre, which made its rulers wealthy and strong.

== List of Emirs of Gwandu ==
Although the Sokoto Caliphate was considered a 'dual empire', with Sokoto and Gwandu serving a co-capitals, the Gwandu rulers were simply addressed as emirs. The Arabic title used in official correspondence was Amir al-gharb ('Emir of the West') and the title used with foreign states was Amir aqalim al-gharb al-falatiyya wa'l-sudaniyya.

No.	Portrait	Name	Reign	Notes	Seat
1		Abdullahi dan Fodio	1812 – 8 July 1829		Bodinga (1812–1817); Gwandu (1817–1829)
2		Muhammad Wani	1829 – 1833		Gwandu
3		Ibrahim Khalilu	1833 – 1858		Gwandu
4		Haliru	1858 – 1860		Gwandu
5		Aliyu	1860 – 1864		Ambursa
6		Abdulkadiri	1864 – 1868		Ambursa
7		Al-Mustafa	1868 – 1875		Ambursa
8		Hanafi	1875 – 1876		Ambursa
9		Maliki	1876 – 1888		Gwandu
10		Umaru Bakatara	1888 – 1897		Gwandu
11		Abdullahi Bayero	1897 – 1898		Gwandu
12		Bayero Aliyu	1898 – March 1903		Gwandu
Native Authority under British colonial rule (1903–1960)
12		Bayero Aliyu	March 1903 – May 1903		Gwandu
13		Muhammadu Aliyu	8 May 1903 – 20 March 1906		Gwandu
14		Haliru II	21 March 1906 – 21 March 1915		Birnin Kebbi
15		Muhammadu Basharu	16 April 1915 – 1918		Birnin Kebbi
16		Usman	1918 – 1938		Birnin Kebbi
17		Yahaya	1918 – January 1954		Birnin Kebbi
18		Haruna Rasheed	January 1954 – 1 October 1960		Birnin Kebbi
Native Authority under Independent Nigeria (1960–1966)
18		Haruna Rasheed	1 October 1960 – January 1966		Birnin Kebbi
Non-sovereign from military era to Nigerian Fourth Republic (1966–present)
18		Haruna Rasheed	January 1966 – August 1995		Birnin Kebbi
19		Mustapha Jokolo	July 1995 – 3 June 2005		Birnin Kebbi
20		Muhammad Ilyasu-Bashar	5 June 2005 – present		Birnin Kebbi
