= Nasiru Shehu Bodinga =

Nigerian politician

Representative of Dange Shuni, Bodinga, and Tureta at the 10th National Assembly
- Incumbent
- Assumed office 13 June 2023
- Preceded by: Balarabe Shehu Kakale

Personal details
- Born: 11 March 1988 (age 38) Bodinga
- Party: All Progressives Congress
- Education: Usmanu Danfodiyo University
- Profession: Politician

Nasiru Shehu Bodinga also known as Nasiru Bobo (born 11 March 1988) is a Nigerian politician and a current House of Representatives member in the 10th National Assembly, representing Dange Shuni, Bodinga, and Tureta Federal Constituency since June 2023.

== Early life and career ==
Nasiru was born on 11 March 1988 in Bodinga town. He pursued his education at Usmanu Danfodiyo University, where he obtained a degree in Political Science. During the 2023 Nigerian General Election, Nasir contested the House of Representatives seat representing the Dange Shuni, Bodinga, and Tureta Federal Constituency as the candidate for the All Progressives Congress (APC).

He won with 40,994 votes defeating his closest opponent, the incumbent Balarabe Shehu Kakale who garnered a total number of 35,687 votes after the supplementary elections.
