= Muhammad Wani =

Emir of Gwandu (1829–1833)

Emir of Gwandu
- Reign: 1829–1833
- Predecessor: Abdullahi dan Fodio
- Successor: Ibrahim Khalil
- Born: 1789
- Died: 1833 (aged 43–44); Gwandu, Sokoto Caliphate (today in Kebbi State, Nigeria)
- Issue: Al-Mustafa: Maliki; Abdullahi Bayero
- Father: Abdullahi dan Fodio

Muhammad Wani bin Abdullahi bin Fudi (1789–1833) was the second Emir of Gwandu from 1829 to 1833. He was the eldest son of Abdullahi dan Fodio, and fought as a young commander during the Sokoto jihad, which started in 1804 and ended in 1808. Wani later administered Gwandu on behalf of his father. After Abdullahi's death in 1829, Wani was elected as emir. His reign was marked by campaigns against the Kebbawa rebels of Argungu, the Arewa, and neighbouring Yoruba and Borgu states.

== Life ==
Muhammad Wani was born in 1789 as the eldest son of Abdullahi dan Fodio, a Fulani scholar and poet. Starting in 1804 and ending in 1808, Abdullahi's brother Usman led a jihad against the Muslim rulers of Hausaland, calling for Islamic reform and the adoption of Islamic law. As Usman's chief wazir (vizier or assistant), Abdullahi played a leading role in the jihad, especially in the western territories.

Wani also participated in the jihad, fighting as a young commander. Following the end of the jihad in 1808, Usman ruled as Amir al-Muʾminīn of the Sokoto Caliphate. A few years later, he delegated authority over the western territories to Abdullahi, who administered them from his headquarters in Gwandu. As Abdullahi increasingly withdrew from administration to focus on scholarship and religious teaching, he entrusted Wani with managing the emirate. From his base at Birnin Kebbi, Wani built up a circle of trusted followers and assigned them responsibilities over different aspects of administration.

In 1817, after Caliph Muhammad Bello crushed a revolt by the Ba-Are scholar Abd al-Salam, some of Abd al-Salam's followers regrouped at Kalambaina and began another revolt. They held out for two years against Abdullahi's forces until a combined army led by Bello and senior commanders, including Wani, succeeded in capturing it and quelling the rebellion.

=== Reign ===
In 1829, Abdullahi died of illness and Wani was soon elected his successor. According to local tradition, Abdullahi summoned Wani to Gwandu before his death so that his son could bury him. Although other candidates were candidates, particularly Abdullahi's other sons, Wani was the natural favourite due to his many years of administrative experience. His established control of the actual administration also allowed him to build a strong support of powerful followers and district administrators who were in the position to influence his formal appointment as emir. His appointment was later confirmed by Caliph Muhammad Bello on a special visit to Gwandu.

Wani's closest followers at Birnin Kebbi were Gudugudu, Zarumi na Kola, and Uthman b. Sanusi, all celebrated warriors. Others who led powerful groups were the Sarkin Dendi of Zogirma, and the Sarkin Aliero. Uthman was appointed Magajin Gari and put in charge of Birnin Kebbi, which reportedly angered Zarumi and Gudugudu, who fell out with Wani and left to found the villages of Kola and Kardin Gudugudu respectively.

During Wani's reign, the Kebbawa rebels of Argungu under Karari were a persistent threat. With support from the Zabermawa and Arewa, Karari led an armed resistance against the Caliphate. In 1831, a combined Sokoto-Gwandu force jointly commanded by Caliph Bello and Emir Wani, marched against Argungu. After taking a number of Kebbi towns, they besieged Argungu, and set fire to houses. Its inhabitants eventually capitulated, and expelled Karari and his followers. After a short pursuit, Karari surrendered and was killed. He was said to have been found by the Gwandu forces sat on his shield in the posture of prayer. His son Yakubu Nabame escaped capture but later surrendered and was taken to Sokoto, where he lived as a captive under the Caliph's supervision.

To prevent further revolts, Wani led the sacking of the Arewa towns of Beibei, Damana, and Birnin Debi, and forbade them ever to rebuild their walls. Other expeditions included an unsuccessful attack on Wawa in Borgu and a campaign against the Yoruba, in which a town called 'Kwajobi' was captured. The identity of the conquered town is uncertain but historian Robin Law suggests it may have been Gbajigbo near the River Moshi.

In 1831, the emirate of Ilorin was established and placed under the authority of Gwandu.

Wani died in 1833. His brother Ibrahim Khalil was elected as his successor. According to tradition, Wani had nominated Khalil before his death.
