= Inuwa Abdulkadir =

Nigerian politician (1966–2020)

Magatakarda Inuwa Abdulkadir

Minister of Youth Development
- In office 2012–2013
- President: Goodluck Jonathan

Personal details
- Born: 12 January 1966 Sokoto, Northern Region, Nigeria (now Sokoto, Nigeria)
- Died: 6 July 2020 (aged 54) Sokoto, Nigeria
- Citizenship: Nigerian
- Children: 10
- Education: Usman Danfodiyo University; Nigerian Law School
- Profession: Barrister and politician

Inuwa Abdulkadir (12 January 1966 – 6 July 2020) was a Nigerian lawyer and politician who was National vice-chairman (North West) of the All Progressives Congress (APC). He previously served as Federal Minister of Youth Development from 2012 to 2013, before falling out with President Goodluck Jonathan and supporting President Muhammadu Buhari in the 2015 presidential election.

He also served as Secretary of the Sokoto Sultanate Council before later becoming Secretary of the Arewa Consultative Forum – a political and cultural association of leaders in Northern Nigeria. In 1996, Sultan Muhammadu Maccido gave him the traditional title of Magatakarda (Chief Scribe) of the Sokoto Caliphate.

== Biography ==
Inuwa Abdulkadir was born in Sokoto on 12 January 1966. He attended Ahmadu Bello Academy in Farufaru from 1977 to 1982, before proceeding to the Usman Danfodio University in Sokoto from 1982 to 1990, where he studied and received a bachelor's degree in law. In 1990, attended the Nigerian Law School and was subsequently called to the Nigerian Bar in 1991. He later attended the Nigerian Institute of Advanced Legal Studies in Lagos in 1995.

Inuwa later joined the civil service as a state counsel in the Sokoto State Ministry of Justice. In 1992, Inuwa was Secretary (Northern Operations) of spymaster Umaru Shinkafi's presidential campaign for the conservative National Republican Convention (NRC) ticket, which he lost to Bashir Tofa who later contested the annulled 12 June, 1993 presidential election. Inuwa later became Secretary of the Sokoto Sultanate Council. He also served as Attorney General/ Minister of Justice of Sokoto State and was also a Member of the Sokoto State Penal Law Review Panel, Sokoto State Arabic and Islamic Board, National Youth Service Corps (Sokoto State), and Secretary of the Robbery and Firearms Tribunal under successive military governments in the state.

In 1999, Inuwa was a counsel at the Oputa Panel where he defended the Arewa Consultative Forum against Afenifere. He later became the Assistant National Organizing Secretary of the All Nigeria Peoples Party (ANPP). In 2003, he was the vice presidential running mate of Orji Uzor Kalu of the Progressive Peoples Alliance during the 2003 election. He later became legal adviser and Company Secretary of Sokoto Newspaper Company Limited, before joining the then ruling Peoples Democratic Party.

== Politics ==
In 2012, Inuwa was appointed Federal Minister of Youth Development by President Goodluck Jonathan. In 2013, he was unceremoniously removed from office due to his relationship with Governor Aliyu Wammako who was amongst seven serving governors who formed the G-7 faction within the PDP (nPDP). In November 2013, Wammako alongside five nPDP governors defected to the new opposition party the All Progressives Congress (APC). Inuwa joined them and became a founding member of the All Progressives Congress (APC).

He was later appointed National vice-chairman (North West) of the All Progressives Congress (APC) and supported President Muhammadu Buhari. He later became Chairman of National Agency for Food and Drug Administration and Control (NAFDAC). In 2019, he was suspended for "anti-party activities" from the APC state chapter following his ally Governor Aminu Tambuwal's defection to the Peoples Democratic Party. After calling for Adams Oshiomhole's resignation in July 2019, he was removed as National vice-chairman.

== Personal life ==
On 6 July 2020, Inuwa died after succumbing to complications related to COVID-19 during the COVID-19 pandemic in Nigeria. He was married with two wives[Fatima Ahmed Tafida & Maryam Bello Inuwa] and had ten children (.
