= Karimama =

Karimama may refer to:

- Karimama, Benin
- Karimama, Burkina Faso
