= Jibril ibn Umar =

18th-century Islamic scholar, jurist, and Sufi from Agadez

Personal life
- Died: circa 1790 Madaoua, Sultanate of Aïr (today in Niger Republic)
- Pen name: Jibril bin Umar al-Aqdasi

Religious life
- Religion: Islam
- Denomination: Sunni
- Tariqa: Khalwatiya: Qadiriya; Shadhiliya

Muslim leader
- Students: Usman dan Fodio, Abdullahi dan Fodio

Jibril ibn Umar (Arabic: جبريل بن عمر; died c. 1790) was an 18th‑century Sufi scholar, jurist, and Islamic reformist from Agadez. He is most remembered as a teacher and mentor of Usman dan Fodio, Abdullahi dan Fodio, and Muhammed Bello, the leaders of the Sokoto jihad.

Jibril was known for his extreme zeal to reform Islam in the central Sudan. He argued that Muslims who committed grave sins were no longer Muslims, a view regarded by many, including his own students, as excessively radical. Despite this, he had an immense influence on the Sokoto jihad, with Usman dan Fodio later crediting him as a major inspiration for his reformist campaign in the 19th century.

== Life ==
Not much is known about Jibril's life with certainty. According to his nisba, he was from Agadez and was likely of Hausa-Tuareg parentage. His teachers included well-respected scholars in Hausaland, the most renowned being Ali Jobbo, a Fulani scholar whose tomb was venerated as late as the mid-19th century. Jibril came to become a scholar of note, amassing a following of students from around the region, including Usman dan Fodio and his brother Abdullahi.

Jibril made two pilgrimages to Mecca during his life. During the first, he stayed in Egypt for several years, where he studied under Ahmad al-Dardir (d. 1786), one of the most prominent members of the Khalwati Sufi order at the time. Jibril was initiated into the order while in Cairo, and, upon returning to Agadez, he initiated Usman, Abdullahi, and Usman's son, Muhammad Bello, into the Khalwati order.

In the late 18th century, during a yearlong stay at Agadez, Jibril made a call to jihad, but this was unpopular and he was forced to flee. He then decided to undertake a second pilgrimage to Mecca, inviting his student Usman to accompany him. However, Usman's father refused to permit him. During this journey, Jibril met Muhammad Murtada al-Zabidi (d. 1790), who gave him a general ijaza. He did not stay in Mecca long and returned from his journey in 1786, seemingly settling in Adar. He died in Madaoua. One of his sons, Muhammadan, participated in the Sokoto jihad and was appointed Alkalin Daji, serving as a judge during the reign of Caliph Muhammad Bello (1817–1837).

== Legacy ==
Jibril, Shaykh of shaykhs in our country
Blessings are what he confers in great number
He disperses the gloom of error
Like a lamp shedding light over the land.

— Muhammed Bello

Jibril is most remembered for his influence on the leaders of the Sokoto jihad, particularly Usman dan Fodio. His overzealous commitment to reform Islam in the central Sudan has led some historians to describe him as an iconoclast. He argued that Muslims who committed grave sins or disobeyed Sharia law were no longer Muslims, a view his student Usman rejected as too radical. Jibril was also a vocal critic of practices such as syncretism, wine‑drinking, and the mixing of sexes. These views, according to Usman, put Jibril close to the doctrines of the medieval Muslim theological schools of the Khawarij and the Mu'tazila.

Some scholars attribute Jibril's radical views to possible exposure to Wahhabism during his long stays in the Middle East. Others, however, argue that despite some similarities, they were key differences between the Wahhabist movement and that of Jibril and his students, particularly the Wahhabi opposition to Sufism.

Although Usman saw some of his teacher's views as extreme, he greatly admired Jibril and gave him credit for initiating a campaign against "evil practices in this Sudanic land of ours." This admiration is captured in one of Usman's poems: "If there be said of me that which is said of good report, then I am but a wave of the waves of Jibril."
