= Balarabe Shehu Kakale =

Nigerian politician and doctor

Balarabe Shehu Kakale is a Nigerian medical doctor and politician. He served as the Commissioner of Health and later Budget and Economic planning in Sokoto State, before becoming a member of the House of Representatives representing Bodinga, Dange Shuni and Tureta federal constituency in Sokoto. He is currently the chairman of the House Committee on Nigeria/Brazil Parliamentary Relations.
