= Sokoto Sultanate Council =

Sultanate of Sokoto
- Northern Nigerian Emirate
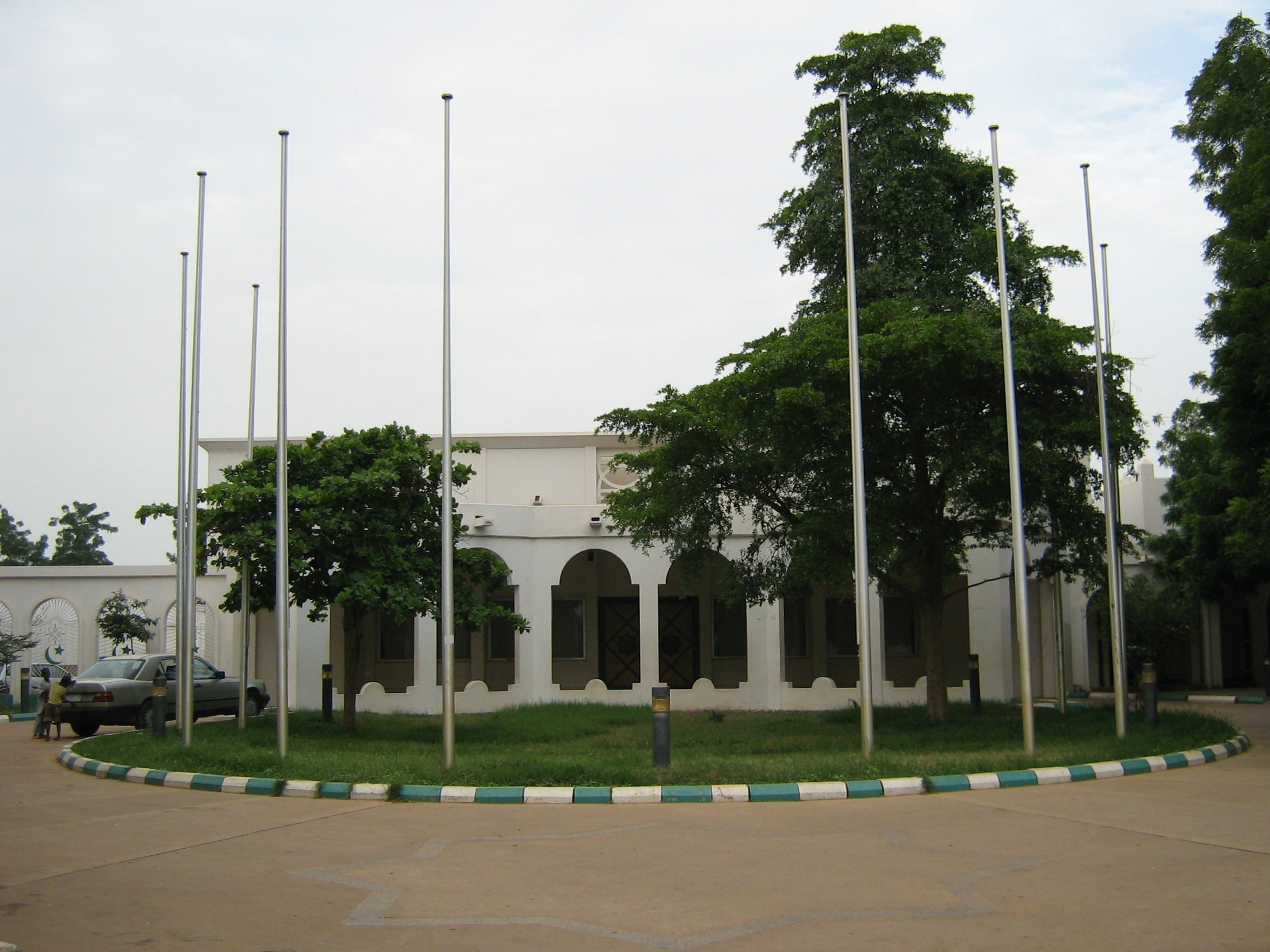
- Sokoto

- Flag

- Location within Nigeria
- Coordinates: 13°04′N 5°14′E
- Country: Northern Nigeria
- Emirate: Sultanate of Sokoto
- Established: 23 February 1903
- Founder: British Empire
- Emirate: Emirate
- Boroughs: List: Binji; Bondiga; Dange Shuni; Gada; Goronyo; Gudu; Gwadabawa; Isa; Kebbe; Kwara; Rabah; Sabon Birni; Shagari; Silame; Sokoto North; Sokoto South; Tambuwal; Tangaza; Tureta; Wamako; Wurno; Yabo

Government
  - Sultan: Sa'adu Abubakar
  - Grand Vazier: Sambo Junaidu
- Languages: Arabic (official), Hausa (official), Fula

The Sultanate of Sokoto is a traditional state in Northern Nigeria with headquarters in the city of Sokoto, capital of the modern Sokoto State. Preceded by the Sokoto Caliphate, the council was formed in 1903 after the British pacification of the caliphate.

The Sultan of Sokoto serves as the supreme spiritual leader of Muslims in Nigeria and the grand Sheik of the Qadiriyya sufi order in that country. In 2006, Sa'adu Abubakar was crowned the Sultan of Sokoto.

== History ==
After the pacification of Northern Nigeria, The British established the Northern Nigeria Protectorate to govern the region, which included most of the Sokoto empire and its most important emirates. Under Luggard, the various emirs were provided significant local autonomy, thus retaining much of the political organization of the Sokoto Caliphate. The Sokoto area was treated as just another emirate within the Nigerian Protectorate. Because it was never connected with the railway network, it became economically and politically marginal.

The Sultan of Sokoto has continued to be regarded as an important Muslim spiritual and religious titleholder; the lineage connection to dan Fodio has continued to be recognized. One of the most significant Sultans was Siddiq Abubakar III, who held the position for 50 years, from 1938 to 1988. He was known as a stabilizing force in Nigerian politics, particularly in 1966 after the assassination of Ahmadu Bello, the Premier of Northern Nigeria.

Following the death of Siddiq Abubakar in 1988, Nigerian dictator Ibrahim Babangida interfered in the succession, naming Ibrahim Dasuki, one of his business associates, as the Sultan of Sokoto. Large parts of Northern Nigeria erupted in violent protests targeting Dasuki's businesses. In 1996, the Nigerian dictator Sani Abacha deposed him, appointing Muhammadu Maccido, who ruled until he died in a plane crash in 2006.

== Government ==
House of Usman dan Fodio
- Nigerian royal dynasty The quasi-heraldic flag of Sokoto, symbol of the kings and emperors of the Caliphate
- Parent house: Torodbe
- Current region: North
- Founded: 19th century
- Founder: Usman dan Fodio
- Current head: Sa'adu Abubakar
- Titles: Sultan of Sokoto; Waziri of Sokoto; Sardauna of Sokoto; Yarima of Sokoto; Hakimi of Sokoto.
- Styles: Ranka Dede; Eminence; Royal Highness
- Members: Muhammed Bello; Nana Asma'u; Ahmadu Bello
- Connected families: Sullubawa of Kano and Katsina; Tall of Segou
- Traditions: Islam; Folk Islam
- Motto: NasrunminAllah (Arabic for "Victory is from God alone.")
- Cadet branches: Bello family (Sokoto); Gidado family (Sokoto); Tall family (Senegambia)

Under the British indirect administrative structure, the Sultan and his fellow Emirs were the sole Native Authorities, subordinate to the supervision of the British Colonial Residents. Hakimai (or titled chiefs) assisted the Sultan or Emir in the administration of his state. This system was largely retained during the Nigerian First Republic.

In 1966, the overthrow of the Government of Northern Nigeria led to a reorganisation of Nigeria's federal structure. This slowly decreased the administrative independence of Northern Nigeria and its emirates.

== Commerce ==
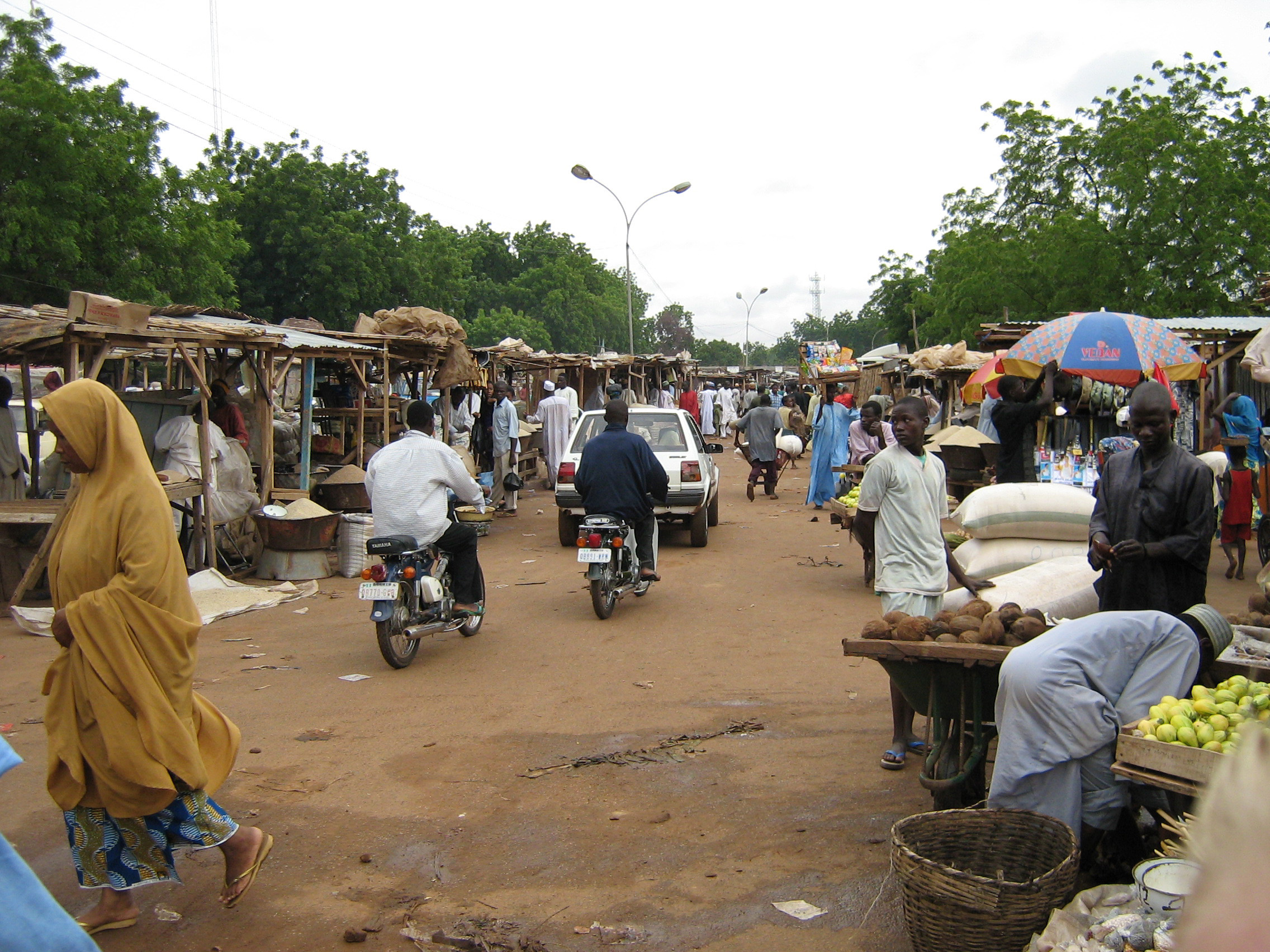
Sokoto Market

Over eighty percent (80%) of the inhabitants of Sokoto practice one form of agriculture or another. They produce such crops as millet, guinea corn, maize, rice, potatoes, cassava, groundnuts and beans for subsistence and produce wheat, cotton and vegetables for cash. Local crafts such as blacksmithing, weaving, dyeing, carving and leather work also play an important role in the economic life of the people of Sokoto; as a result different areas like Makera, Marina, Takalmawa and Majema have become important. Sokoto is also one of the fish producing areas of the country. Thus, a large number of people along the river basin engage in fishing.

Sokoto is equally endowed with natural and mineral resources. Agro-allied industries using cotton, groundnut, sorghum, gum, maize, rice, wheat, sugar cane, cassava, gum Arabic and tobacco as raw materials can be established in the area. Large scale farming can also be practiced in the state using irrigation water from Goronyo Dam, Lugu, Kalmalo, Wammakko and Kwakwazo lakes, among others.

Minerals such as kaolin, gypsum, limestone, laterite, red mills, phosphate both yellow and green, shade clay and sand are available in commercial quantities. Mineral based industries using these raw materials could be established in the state. The Sokoto cement factory, located in Wamakko, is a typical example.

The absence of the tse-tse fly on the open grassland benefits both wild and domestic animals. Sokoto ranks second in livestock production in the country's animal population of well over eight million.

The availability of this economic potential provides good investment opportunities, particularly in agro-allied industries such as flour mills, tomato processing, sugar refining, textiles, glue, tanning, fish canning, etc.

== See also ==
- Sokoto Caliphate
