= Sharh Qatr al-Nada =

Arabic grammar book

Sharḥ Qaṭr al-Nadā
- Author: Ibn Hisham al-Ansari (1309 – 1360 CE)
- Original title: شرح قطر الندى وبل الصدى
- Language: Arabic
- Subject: Arabic grammar
- Genre: Prose

Sharḥ Qaṭr al-Nadā wa-Ball al-Ṣadā (Arabic: شرح قطر الندى وبل الصدى, lit. 'Explanation of Dewdrop and the Quenching of Thirst') is an Arabic grammar book written by Ibn Hisham al-Ansari (1309 – 1360 CE) for learning the Arabic language.

== Presentation ==
Sharḥ Qatr al-Nada is a book on Arabic grammar written by Ibn Hisham al-Ansari, one of the main scholars of the Arabic language.

The book consists of an original and an explanation of the same author, so the original is a body Qatr al-Nada, and the commentary is an explanation of the same body.

It is considered one of the grammatical references in teaching students the Arabic language.

== Contents ==
The book includes most of the grammar chapters closely similar to the book The Golden Shades in Knowing the Words of the Arabs (Arabic: شذور الذهب في معرفة كلام العرب), in terms of subtraction and arrangement of titles, but it is less detailed than it, in a way that makes it more suitable for the reader and the learner, in the middle stages of education.

It begins with the Kalima and ends with Hamzat al-Wasl, and is considered a summary in which grammatical rules are summarized in a brief form, and the explanation is an explanation of the content of the body phrases, a statement of what is intended, and includes the divisions and details, and mention the evidence.

== See also ==
- Arabic grammar
