= Emirates of the Sokoto Caliphate =

The Sokoto Caliphate was a loose confederation of emirates that recognized the suzerainty of the Amir al-Mu'minin. The caliphate was established in 1809 and later became the largest pre-colonial African state. The boundaries of the caliphate are part of present-day Cameroon, Burkina Faso, Niger, and Nigeria.

According to historian Mahmud Modibbo Tukur, by the turn of the 20th-century, the Sokoto Caliphate covered an area of about 388,500 square kilometres (or 150,000 square miles), not including parts of Adamawa (Fombina), located in modern-day Cameroon, which is estimated to cover over 100,000 square kilometres.

At the end of the 19th-century, the Caliphate comprised 30 emirates, excluding its twin capitals of Gwandu and Sokoto. Some of these emirates had autonomous sub-emirates under them, with Adamawa having the most, numbering over 40. Most of the emirates were grouped by regional titles: the western emirates were known as the aqalim al-gharb; the southern ones aqalim al-yemen; and the emirates in the no-man's-land between Hausaland and Borno as Borno Gudiri or Ghaladi. The eastern and western territories were administered from the twin capitals of Sokoto and Gwandu respectively.

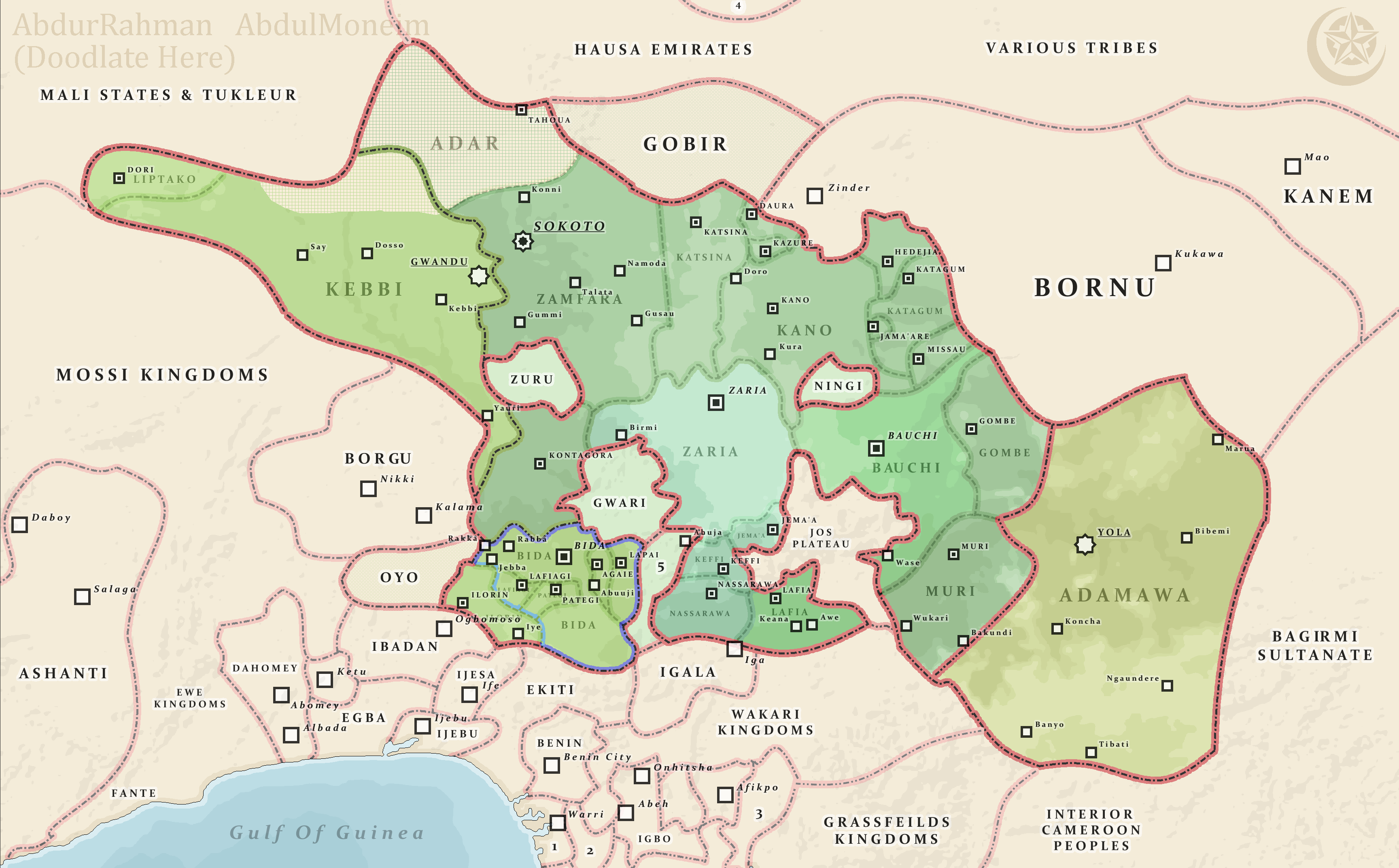
Sokoto Caliphate during the reign of Ahmadu Rufai (1867–1873)

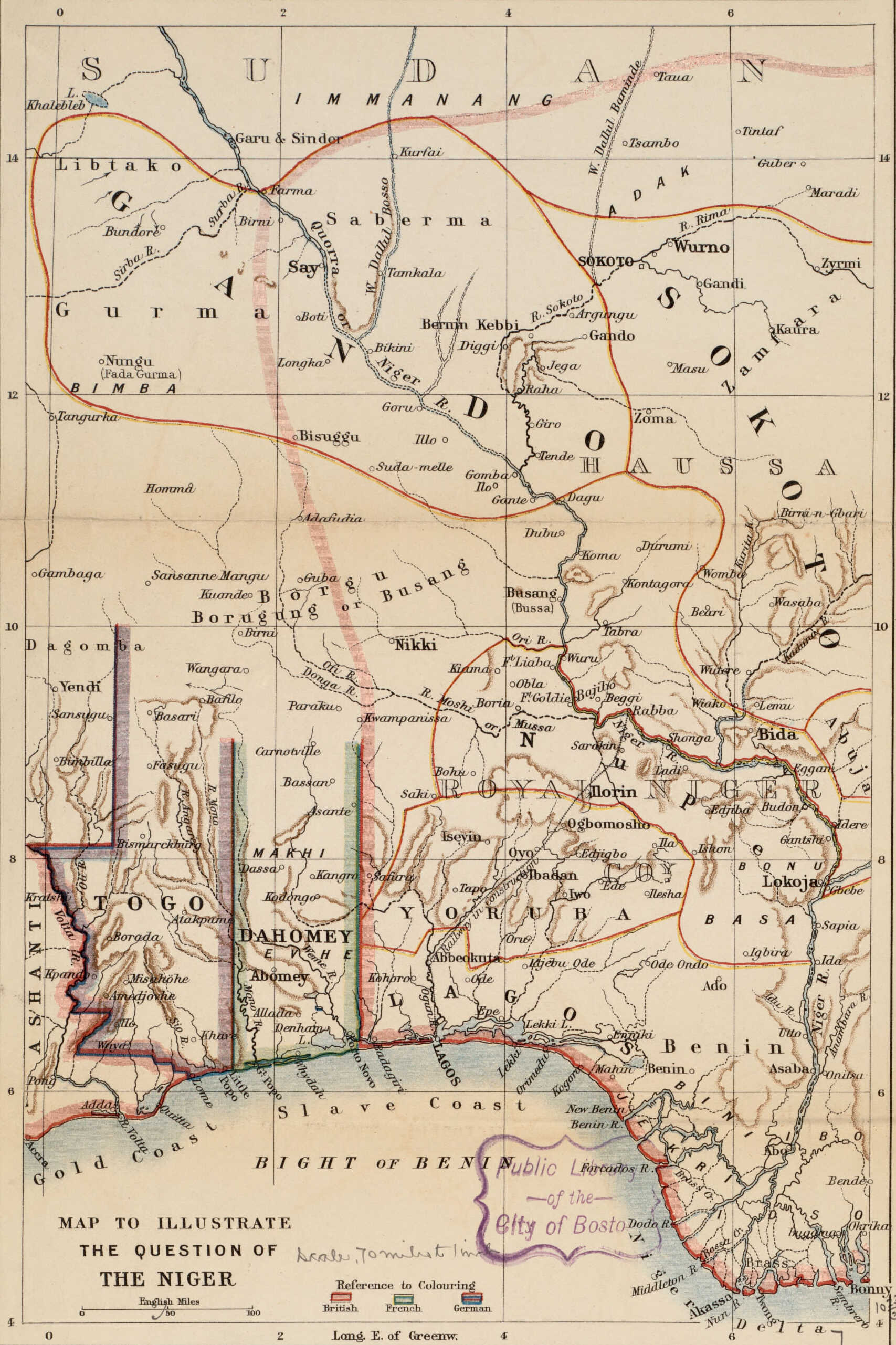
Map showing the westernmost area of the Caliphate which was governed by Gwandu

According to historian Yusufu Bala Usman, the emirates were:

Emirate	Date joined	Capital
Adamawa Emirate (Fombina)	1809 (created)	Yola
Agaie Emirate	1832 (created)	Agaie
Bauchi Emirate	1809 (created)	Bauchi
Bida Emirate	1835	Bida
Birnin-Gaoure		Birni N'Gaouré
Bitinkogi		Lamorde
Daura Emirate	1805	Daura
Gelajo		Gelajo
Gombe Emirate	1804 (created)	Gombe
Gwandu Emirate	1809 (created)	Gwandu
Hadejia Emirate		Hadejia
Jama'are Emirate		Jama'are
Jema'a Emirate		Jema'a
Junju Emirate		Gaya
Ilorin Emirate	1824 (created)	Ilorin
Kano Emirate	1807	Kano
Katagum Emirate	1807 (created)	Katagum
Katsina Emirate	1807	Katsina
Kazaure Emirate		Kazaure
Kontagora Emirate	1864 (created)	Kontagora
Lapai Emirate	1825 (created)	Lapai
Lafiagi Emirate		Lafiagi
Liptako Emirate		Dori
Missau Emirate		Missau
Muri Emirate (Hammanruwa)		Muri
Nasarawa Emirate	1838 (created)	Lafia
Say		Say
Shonga Emirate		
Torodi		Lamorde
Yaga		Sebba
Yauri Emirate		Yauri
Zazzau Emirate	1804	Zaria
