= Ibn Hisham al-Ansari =

Egyptian Arabic grammarian and scholar

- ابْنُ هِشَامٍ الْأَنْصَارِيُّ

Personal life
- Born: 1309 CE (708 AH) Cairo
- Died: 1360 CE (761 AH) Cairo
- Resting place: Cairo
- Region: Egyptian Mamluk Sultanate
- Notable works: Qatr al-Nada; Expressing the Arabic grammar rules; Awadhah al-Masalik; Choudhour al-Thahab; Moughni al-Labib; Charh Choudhour al-Thahab
- Known for: Arabic grammar, Aqidah

Religious life
- Religion: Islam
- School: Hanbali
- Profession: Writer, linguist, theologian, grammarian, poet

Abu Muhammad Abdullah Jamal al-Din bin Yusuf bin Ahmad bin Abdullah bin Hisham al-Ansari al-Masry commonly known as Ibn Hisham Al-Ansari (708 AH – 761 AH) (1309 CE – 1360 CE) was an Egyptian scholar of Arabic grammar. He is one of the imams of Arabic grammar, more famous than his peers. He was well-informed, well-spoken, righteous and pious. He accompanied Al-Shihab Abd al-Latif ibn al-Marhil and recited to Ibn al-Siraj, and he heard from Abu Hayyan Al-Andalusi the Diwan (collection) of Zuhayr bin Abi Sulma, but he did not stay with him or read to him anything else. He attended the lessons of Taj al-Din al-Tabrizi and read to Taj al-Din al-Fakahani his explanation of the sign, except for the last page. He narrated on Ibn Jama'ah in Shatibiyyah, and he learned to follow the Shafi’i school of thought. Then he converted to the Hanbali school and memorized Mukhtasar al-Khiraqi five years before his death. A group of people from Egypt and others produced it and issued it for the benefit of the students. It was unique in providing strange benefits and precise investigations. He had the ability to convey information and make students understand. He was humble, mild-mannered, very compassionate, and tender-hearted.

== Early life ==
The scholar Sheikh Ibn Hisham Al-Ansari was born in Cairo in Dhu al-Qadah, in the year of 708 AH, corresponding to the year 1309 CE.

During his youth, he had a love for knowledge and associated with scholars and intellectuals.

== His teachers ==
Ibn Hajar al-Asqalani mentioned that Ibn Hisham was associated with a number of stallions of his time, and he received knowledge at the hands of the scholars of his time and became their apprentices, including Ibn al-Siraj, Abu Hayyan al-Andalusi, al-Taj al-Tabrizi, al-Taj al-Fakahani, al-Shihab ibn al-Marhil, Ibn Jama'ah, and others.

== Scientific status ==
Ibn Hisham mastered Arabic, specialized in grammar, and had two books: “Moughni al-Labib 'an Kutub al-A'arib” and “Awdah al-Masalik Ilah Alfiyyah Ibn Malik.” He resonated with the souls, and he gained a status among scholars and writers “so he became famous during his lifetime, and people turned to him.” However, his fame was not limited to Egypt alone, but rather extended to the East and the West, as Ibn Hajar al-Asqalani mentioned, quoting Ibn Khaldun, saying: “While we are in Morocco, we still hear that an Arabic language scholar appeared in Egypt, called: Ibn Hisham".

Ibn Hisham was said to possess intelligence and memory, as he was able to collect several sciences and excel in them. He was known for his knowledge, deductive skill, and rhetorical faculty with which he was able to express intention in length and summary. He had strong memorization faculties throughout his entire life, and he memorized Mukhtasar Al-Kharqi in less than four months, five years before his death.

== Religiosity and ethics ==
Ibn Hisham was a devout scholar. He was not accused of his beliefs, his religiosity, or his behavior. He was a Shafi’i sect. He converted to Hanbali at the end of his life, and this indicates that he was deeply rooted in both sects. Ibn Hisham was distinguished by “humility, righteousness, compassion, gentleness of character, and tenderness of heart,” in addition to his religion, chastity, good conduct, and uprightness. In addition to that, he was patient in the pursuit of knowledge, continuing to pursue it until the end of his life. Among his poetry about patience is:

1. "Whoever perseveres in knowledge will achieve it..
2. ..Whoever proposes to a beautiful woman must be patient with the effort..
3. ..And who does not humiliate the soul in seeking highness..
4. ..For a short time will live a long life as a humiliated brother.

== Books ==
This linguist has written several books, including:

- Qatr al-Nada
- Expressing the Arabic grammar rules
- Awdah al-Masalik
- Shudhur al-Dhahab
- Mughni al-Labib
- Sharh Shudhur al-Dhahab

== Death ==
Ibn Hisham died on a Friday night on the fifth of Dhul al-Qaidah in the year 761 AH, corresponding to the year 1360 CE.
