= Sambo Junaidu =

13th Wazirin Sokoto

Professor Sambo Wali Junaidu is a scholar of Islam and Arabic Literature. He is the 13th Wazirin Sokoto and Chairman Advisory Committee on Religious Affairs and Moon Sighting Committee, Sokoto Sultanate Council. He was a former lecturer at the Department of Arabic Studies of the Usmanu Danfodiyo University, Sokoto. He succeeded his elder brother Alhaji Usman Junaidu the 12th Waziri of Sokoto, who died in 2017. He is an Officer of the Federal Republic.
