= Bodinga =

- LGA and town
- Interactive map of Bodinga
- Location within Nigeria
- Coordinates: 12°53′N 5°10′E
- Country: Nigeria
- State: Sokoto State
- Established: 1809
- Founder: Abdullahi dan Fodio

Government
  - Local Government Chairman: Muhammad Shehu Dingyadi

Area
  - Total: 564 km^{2} (218 sq mi)

Population (2006)
  - Total: 175,406
  - Density: 311/km^{2} (805/sq mi)
- Time zone: UTC+1 (WAT)
- 3-digit postal code prefix: 852
- ISO 3166 code: NG.SO.BO

Bodinga is a town and Local Government Area in Sokoto State, Nigeria. It was first established by Abdullahi dan Fodio in 1809.

It has an area of 564 km^{2} and a population of 175,406 at the 2006 census.

The postal code of the area is 852.

== Climate ==
The climate changes throughout the year from a wet season that is primarily cloudy to a dry season that is mostly hot and partly cloudy.

=== Temperature ===
Bodinga has a warmer climate with a positive trend continuing to rise in temperature and a declining trend continuing to fall in temperature.
