= Karimama, Burkina Faso =

Karimama
- Interactive map of Karimama
- Country: Burkina Faso
- Region: Est Region
- Province: Gnagna Province
- Department: Piéla Department

Population (2019)
  - Total: 1,271

Karimama is a village in the Piéla Department of Gnagna Province in eastern Burkina Faso.

Population
Year	Pop.	±%
1985	512	—
2006	1,051	+105.3%
2019	1,271	+20.9%
