= Sokoto Grand Vizier =

Sokoto Head of Government

Grand vizier of the Sokoto Caliphate
- Wazirin Sokoto
- Flag of the Sokoto Caliphate
- Incumbent; Sambo Wali Junaidu since 2018
- Member of: Sokoto Sultanate Council
- Appointer: The Sultan with Governor of Sokoto State approval and consent
- Formation: 1804
- First holder: Abdullahi dan Fodio

The Sokoto Grand Vizier, or Wazirin Sokoto, was the grand vizier to the sultan of Sokoto, the paramount chief of the Sokoto Caliphate and suzerain of the Usman dan Fodiyo Jihad states. The position survived the fall of the empire as a largely honorary ceremonial rank in contemporary Nigeria.

== List of grand viziers ==
- Abdullahi dan Fodiyo (1804–1817)
- Gidado dan Laima (1817–1842)
- Abd al-Qadir bn Usman Gidado (1842–1859)
- Ibrahim Khalilu bn Abd al-Qadir (1859–1874)
- Abdullahi Bayero bn Gidado (1874–1886)
- Muhammadu Buhari Bin Ahmad (1886–1910)
- Muhammadu Sambo bn Ahmad (1910–1912)
- Abd al- Qadir Maccido bn Bukhari (1912 -1925).
- Adili bn Khalilu (1925–1928)
- Abbas bn Bukhari (1928–1948)
- Muhammadu Junaidu Bin Buhari (1948-1997)
- Usman bin Junaid (1997–2017)
- Sambo Wali Junaidu (2017-Date)
