= Burmi campaign =

Battle between the British Empire and the Nigerian Sokoto Caliphate in 1903

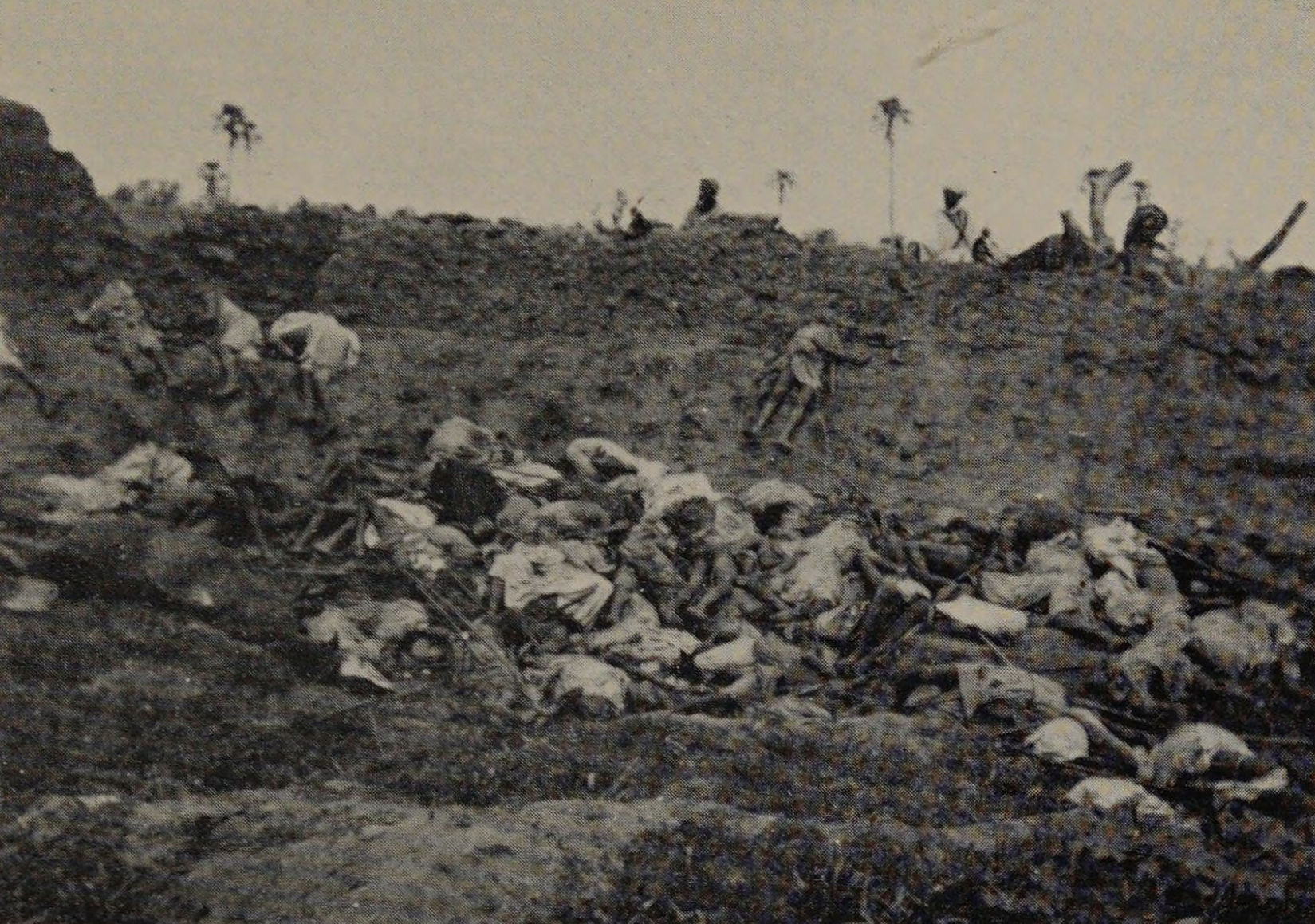
- Scene within the walls of Burmi after the final battle
Date	4 June – 27 July 1903
Location	Burmi, Gombe Emirate (today in Gombe State, Nigeria)
Result	British victory: Sokoto Caliphate subdued; Caliph Muhammadu Attahiru I killed

Belligerents
British Empire: Protectorate of Northern Nigeria	Sokoto Caliphate

Commanders and leaders
Frederick Lugard (United Kingdom of Great Britain and Ireland) Maj. Charles Marsh † (United Kingdom of Great Britain and Ireland) Cap. Hamilton Browne (United Kingdom of Great Britain and Ireland) Cap. W D Sword (United Kingdom of Great Britain and Ireland) Maj. Barlow	(Sokoto Caliphate) Muhammadu Attahiru I †; Emir Abubakar of Bida; Emir Ahmadu of Misau; Kwairanga, Madakin Kano †

Strength
Unknown	Estimated 1,000–10,000, including 1,000 cavalry

Casualties and losses
84 casualties	700+ killed

The Burmi campaign was a series of military engagements in 1903 between the British Empire, through its protectorate in Northern Nigeria, and the Sokoto Caliphate. The campaign followed British victories across the Caliphate's emirates and the capture of its twin capitals, Sokoto and Gwandu. After losing Sokoto, Caliph Muhammadu Attahiru I embarked on a hijra with his followers, seeking to avoid British rule and ultimately settle in Mecca. The British pursued him and his growing following, which included emirs, officials, and others opposed to colonial rule, as they travelled eastward. They were eventually cornered at the town of Burmi in the Gombe Emirate. After weeks of fighting, the campaign culminated in the Battle of Burmi on 27 July 1903, in which Attahiru and much of his following were killed. This marked the effective end of the Sokoto Caliphate, with its eastern territories, alongside some of its western territories, absorbed into British Northern Nigeria.

== Campaign ==
=== Background ===
After the capture of Sokoto by the British colonial forces on 15 March 1903, the Caliph of Sokoto Muhammadu Attahiru was constantly on the move with a large retinue of followers. His intention was to undertake a hijra to Mecca rather than remain under British rule. While attempting to evade British capture, the Caliph passed through several towns, drawing followers who joined him with the intention of making the hijra as well. In the Kano districts, at least half the population of the areas he passed through joined his pilgrimage.

The British continued their pursuit with orders to capture or kill Attahiru, but they were unable to overtake him. During the chase, British forces killed at least 35 people attempting to join the Caliph across "6 engagements". The pursuit continued until it reached the town of Burmi in the Gombe Emirate on 13 June.

=== Early clashes ===
Burmi was nominally under British control. However, after the British appointed town head refused to respond to their summons, they attacked the town. The assault resulted in significant losses for the Burmi forces, with the town head among those killed. Despite their victory, the British were unable to enter the town due to heavy arrow fire from its defenders. They eventually decided to withdraw to Bauchi "lest the 'enemy' mount a successful counter-offensive and finish them off." British casualties included two soldiers killed and fifty-six slightly wounded, while the Burmi defenders suffered heavy losses, with at least 150 killed, their bodies reportedly "lying in heaps in front of the gate."

The British commander at Gujba in the Bornu Province, Captain Hamilton Browne, received news that Attahiru had reached Bima near Gwoni, about 30 miles west of Gujba. Browne immediately left Gujba with one other officer, 51 mercenaries, and a Maxim gun. They eventually reached Gwoni on May 17. Upon sighting Attahiru's camp, they opened fire with the Maxim gun and rifles. Caught by surprise, the Caliph's followers fled across the Gongola River to the west, leaving behind their "entire baggage, 63 guns, a quantity of powder, many camels, horses and donkeys."Attahiru retreated in the direction of Burmi, writing to the British Resident at Bauchi, C L Temple, stating that "he had no wish to fight [and that] all he asked for was to be allowed to travel in peace." Temple replied, "demanding an unconditional surrender."

After learning of the British retreat from Burmi, Browne returned to Gujba, leaving a patrol on the left bank of the Gongola River "to watch the enemy." Around the same time, Major Barlow, another British officer, left Zaria with two other British officers and 60 mounted mercenaries. He reached Gombe on May 23 and, upon receiving news of Attahiru's presence in Burmi, set out to capture the Caliph on May 26. On May 31, Barlow, joined by the patrol left by Browne, occupied the town of Ashaka, located on the Gongola River. The defenders of the town suffered heavy casualties.

=== Failed siege and reinforcements ===
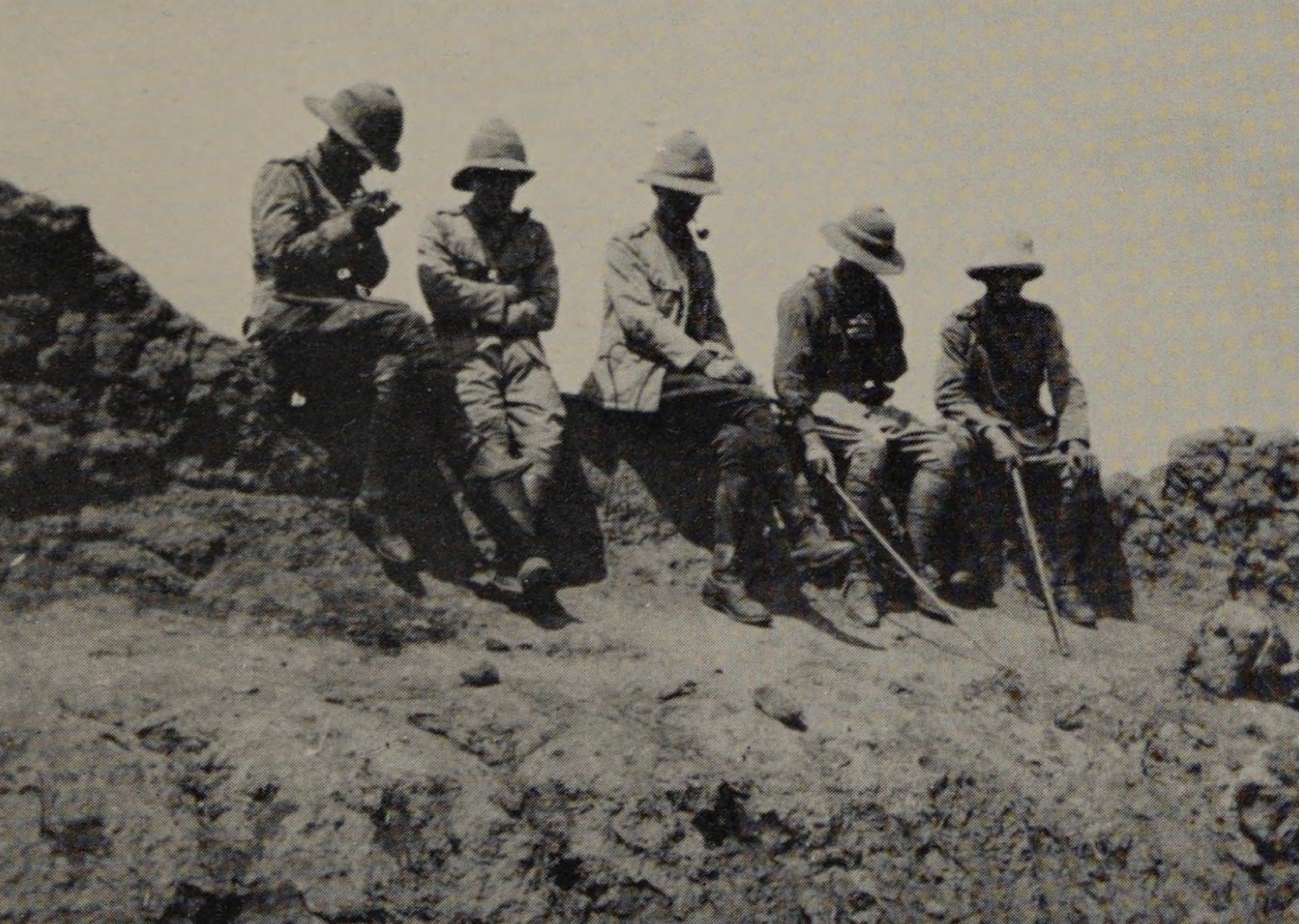
A group of British officers after the battle of Burmi (1903). Second from left is Lieutenant Lawrence, and Major Barlow is fourth from left.

With this combined force, Barlow "proceeded to reconnoiter the town of Burmi without attempting to force an entrance." Beginning on June 4, Barlow enforced a blockade on Burmi, "cutting off their cattle and food supplies" sent in from Bauchi. After about two weeks, the people of Burmi, sufficiently provoked, came out to attack the besieging British. They were eventually repulsed after a long battle, with 18 of them killed.

Meanwhile, news of the earlier British retreat from Burmi reached Zungeru on June 6. In response, the British dispatched an additional force of two officers, half a company of mercenaries, and a large supply of ammunition from Zaria to Bauchi. Major Charles Marsh was sent from Lokoja with a force of nine European officers, 165 mercenaries, and one 75-millimeter gun, arriving in Bauchi on July 12. However, before Marsh's arrival, another force of two European officers and 50 mercenaries under Captain W D Sword reached Burmi from Bauchi on June 19. On the same day, Hamilton Browne arrived at Burmi with 30 mercenaries and a Maxim gun. The reinforcements brought the total British strength at Burmi to seven officers and 180 men. On June 22, they attempted to storm the town but were repulsed, suffering four casualties with 'slight wounds.'

Further reinforcements arrived at Burmi on June 27, increasing the force to 270 'Rank and File.' The reinforcements brought orders from William Wallace, Frederick Lugard's second-in-command, that no further attacks should be made on Burmi until all reinforcements had arrived. On June 30, Barlow, accompanied by Resident Temple and 130 mercenaries with a Maxim gun, proceeded to 'visit' various villages in the surrounding area. During this 'visit,' they sacked and burned down a town called Birri, sustaining a casualty of two men severely wounded and fifteen others slightly wounded.

Meanwhile, back at Burmi, the remaining British forces engaged a small party of 200 defenders who attacked while the British were cutting off food supplies. During the fighting, fifty of the Burmi defenders were killed, while the British lost a horse and several mercenaries were wounded. By July 24, all reinforcements had arrived at Burmi, and the British were prepared to besiege the town again.

=== Final battle ===
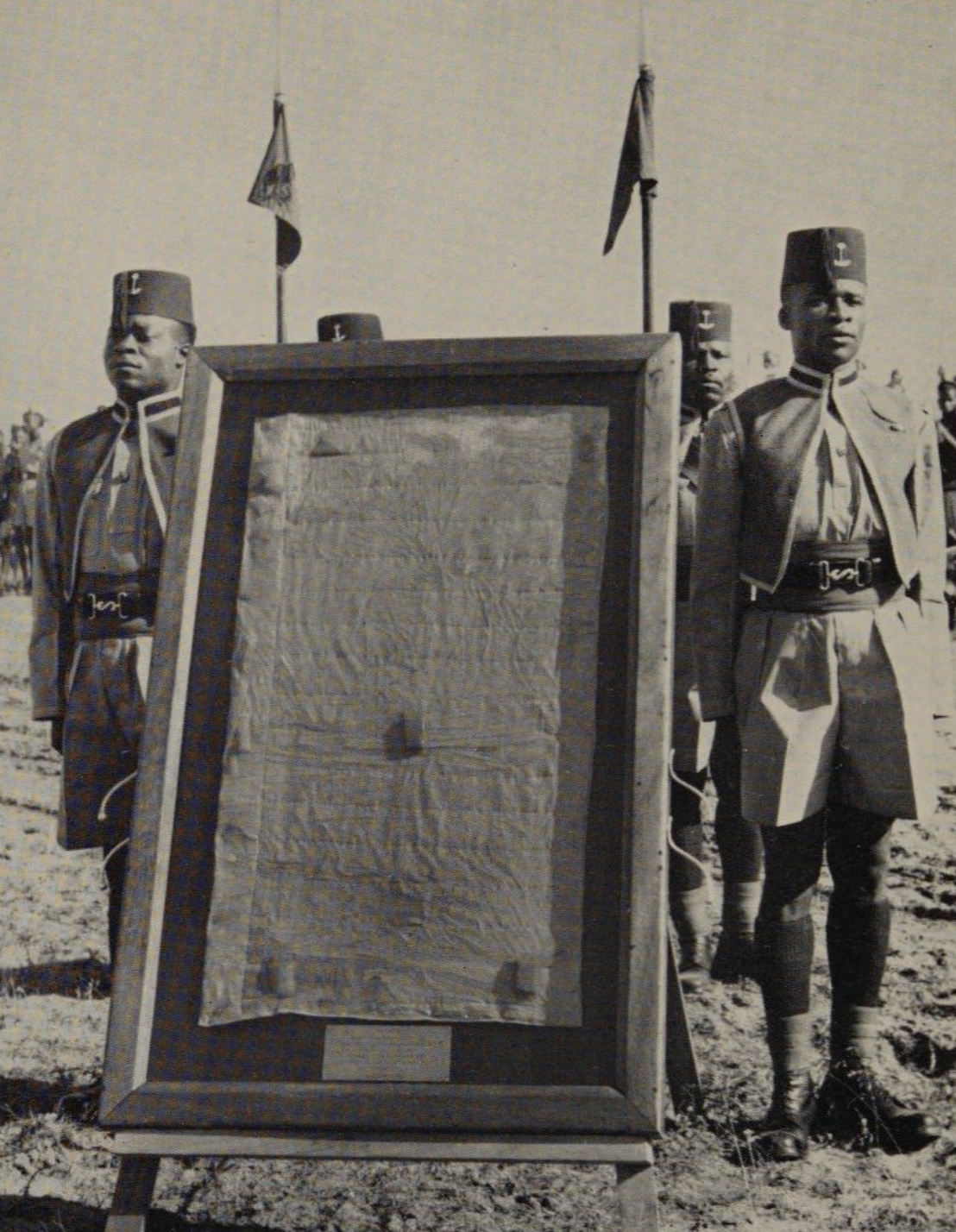
The flag taken by British officer Captain Mundy from beside Caliph Attahiru's body at Burmi. The 1st Battalion, the Queen's Own Nigeria Regiment, returned it to the Sultan of Sokoto on November 6th 1960

The battle began at 11am on 27 July 1903, with British artillery shelling the town of Burmi. Following the shelling of the town, the British launched a frontal assault on the town, lead personally by Major Charles Marsh, who was hit by a poison arrow during the advance. Marsh succumbed to his wounds about 20 minuties later, whilst the battle was still raging.

Once inside the settlement, the British and the remaining Burmi forces engaged in vicious hand-to-hand combat, eventually achieving victory over the remaining defenders and eliminating Muhammadu Attahiru I. According to British reports, "the [Maxim] guns did excellent execution" and at least "over 600 of the enemy were killed and the town burnt." Attahiru's dead body was found lying underneath the corpses of 90 of his followers.

== Aftermath ==
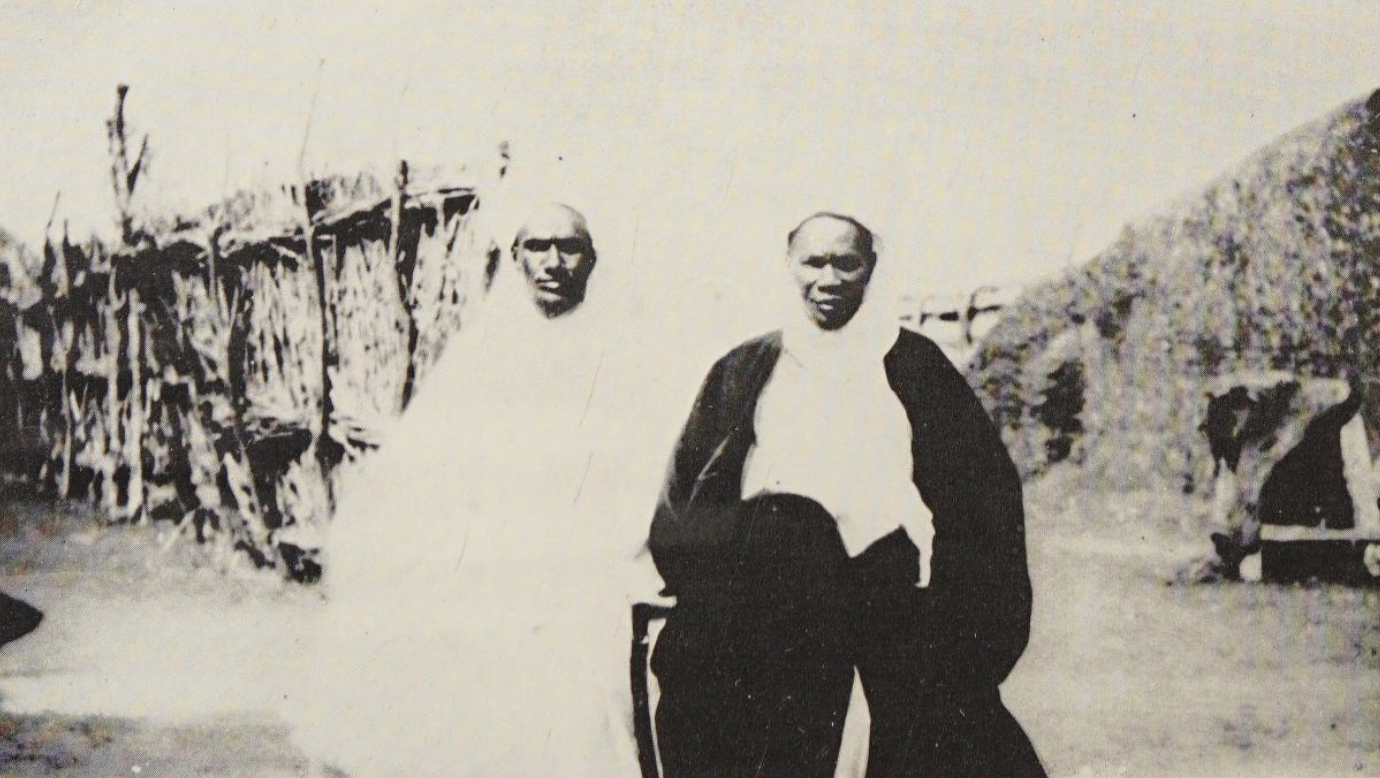
Mai-Wurno (right) with his Waziri at Maiurno (today, located in the Sennar State, Sudan) in October 1928

A British defeat at Burmi was feared by the colonial administration, largely due to the message it would send to the newly conquered emirates within the protectorate. The initial failures to capture Burmi by Captain Sword prompted the Colonial Office in London to alert Sierra Leone, the Gold Coast, Lagos, and Southern Nigeria to prepare reinforcements. The total casualties incurred on the British at Burmi were by far the highest they had suffered during their conquest of the Caliphate. According to William Wallace, then acting High Commissioner of Northern Nigeria, British success was largely attributed to "the great stopping power of our bullets, mark IV, which was one of the principal factors leading to our success. Without this ammunition, our success would have been doubtful."

Attahiru's son, Muhammad Bello bin Attahiru or Mai Wurno continued to lead the remaining members of the movement and eventually settled in Sudan, where many of the descendants still live today. Some other notable Sokoto officials managed to escape capture or death, including Etsu Nupe Abubakar and the Emir of Misau, Ahmadu, both of whom fled to Mecca. However, the Madaki ('commander of the cavalry') of Kano, Kwairanga, was among those killed.

Following the defeat of the Sokoto Caliphate at Burmi, the British installed Muhammadu Attahiru II as Sultan of Sokoto. Further instances of rebellion against British rule persisted until 1906, after another armed rebellion was subdued in the village of Satiru, near Sokoto itself.
