= Battle of Sokoto =

Battle between the British Empire and the Sokoto Caliphate in 1903

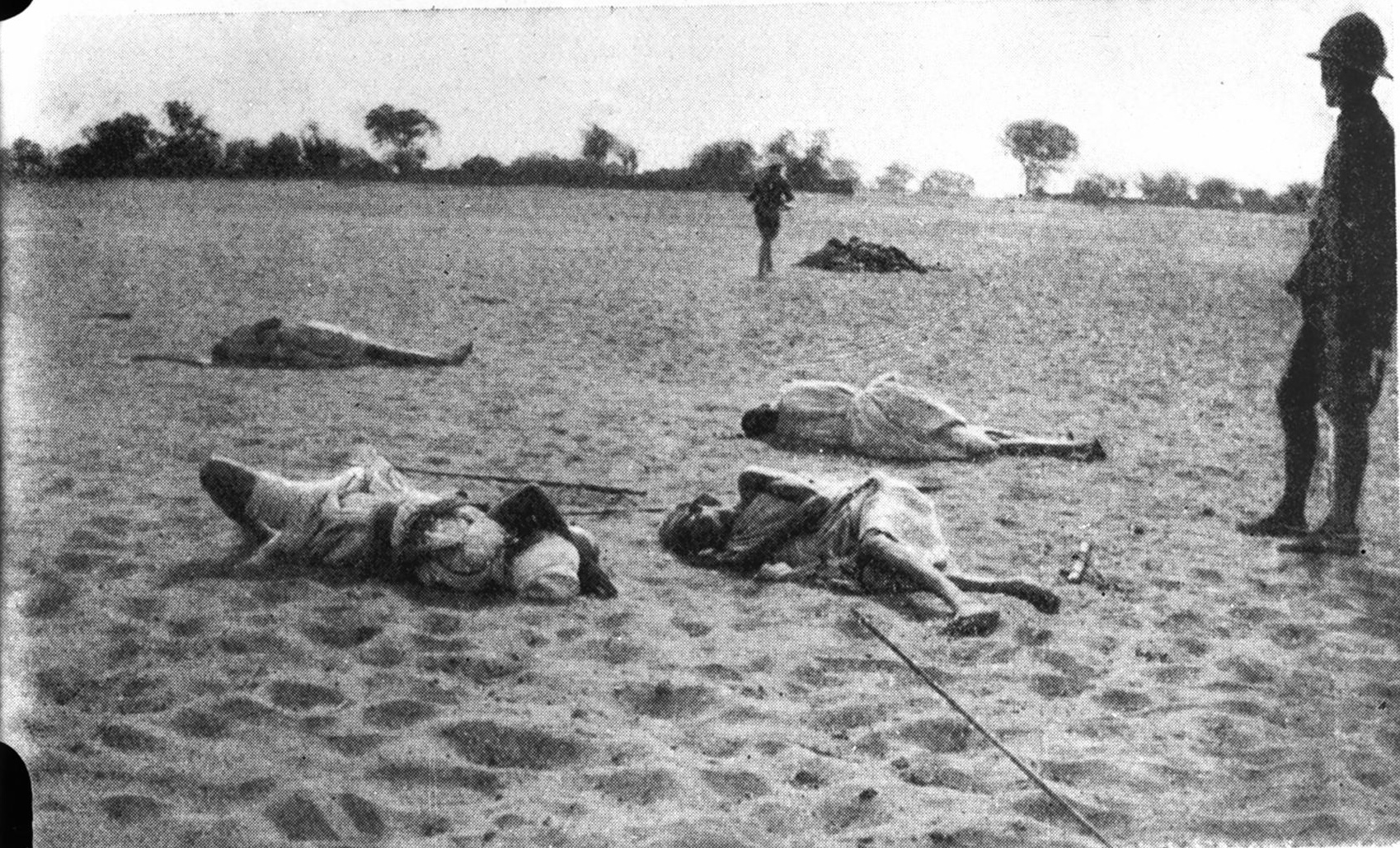
- Some of the dead and wounded being finished off by a British officer after the battle
Date	15 March 1903
Location	Sokoto, Sokoto Caliphate 13°03′44″N 5°14′02″E
Result	British victory: fall of Sokoto city to the British Empire; start of Caliph Muhammadu Attahiru's hijra; installation of Sultan Muhammadu Attahiru II

Belligerents
British Empire: Protectorate of Northern Nigeria	Sokoto Caliphate

Commanders and leaders
Frederick Lugard; Lt. Col. George Kemball; Major Thomas Morland	Muhammadu Attahiru I; Muhammadu Maiturare (WIA); Ibrahim, Sarkin Rabah

Strength
656 rank and file; 400 carriers; 25 officers; 5 NCOs; 2 medical officers; 1 medical NCO; 4 Maxims	~4,000 infantry; ~2,000 cavalry

Casualties and losses
1 dead; 2 wounded	~100

The Battle of Sokoto was fought on 15 March 1903 between the British Northern Nigeria Protectorate and the Sokoto Caliphate in present-day northern Nigeria. In the face of British aggression, the Caliphate's leaders were divided over whether to respond with force, pursue martyrdom, or make a mass hijra (pilgrimage to Mecca) to avoid Christian rule. After the British captured Sokoto, they installed a puppet sultan with reduced powers under the Protectorate, while the fugitive Caliph Attahiru I was pursued and killed at the Battle of Burmi in July 1903, marking the formal end of the century-long Caliphate and the beginning of colonial rule over Northern Nigeria.

== Background ==
News of the 1890 French conquest of Ségou likely reached Sokoto before the end of 1891. By that time, the Sokoto authorities were aware of the rivalry between the European powers of France, Britain and Germany to conquer the caliphate. Later in 1894–95, they witnessed the rivalry between France and Britain (through the Royal Niger Company) in Borgu, Yawuri and Nupeland as both sought to control the Niger River region.

Despite this, Sokoto was preoccupied with the more immediate threat posed by warlord Rabeh az-Zubayr, who had conquered neighbouring Kanem-Bornu in 1893. When the Royal Niger Company (RNC) invaded and destroyed Bida in January 1897, ousting its emir, the Emir of Gwandu opted for diplomacy to resolve the conflict, while the Caliph of Sokoto, Abdurrahman Atiku, did not retaliate. A month later, the Company occupied Ilorin, inflicting heavy casualties on its population. The heavy defeats suffered by these emirates signaled to other emirs and the Caliph that the foreign traders, previously regarded as musta'min, were no longer willing to remain subordinate and possessed superior weaponry and a well-organised force.

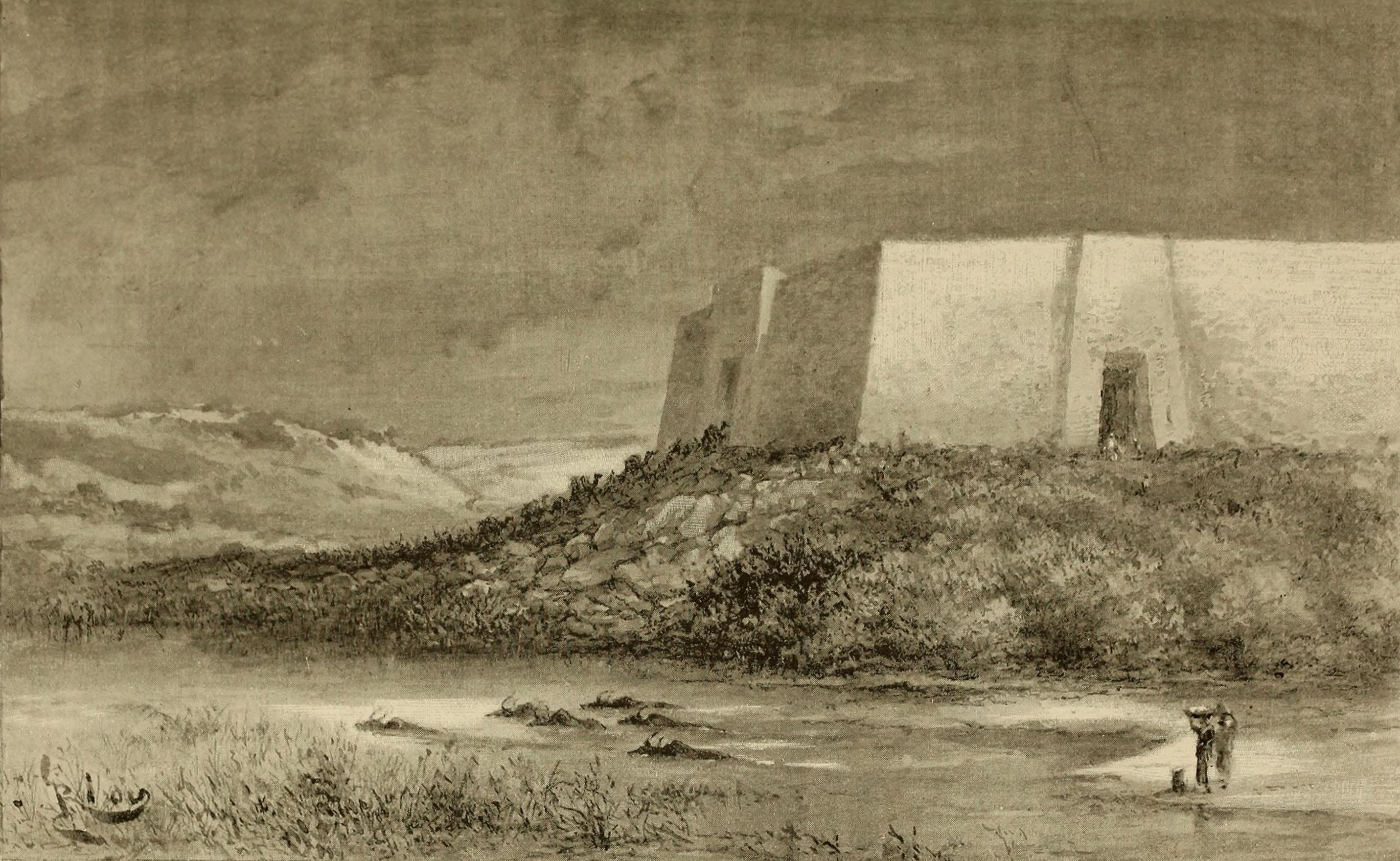
1890 depiction of Sokoto's walls

In early 1898, the arrival of the deposed ruler of Ségou in Sokoto and the French expedition under Marius Gabriel Cazemajou alarmed Caliph Abdurrahman. He permitted the RNC to send a force toward Sokoto under the guise of providing assistance against the French. The company's actual aim was to establish a military post near Sokoto and to secure the Caliph's approval for a Resident in the capital. When Cazemajou agreed to withdraw from the Caliphate, the Company continued its advance. Sensing the threat, Caliph Abdurrahman sent the Emir of Kontagora with 7,000 horsemen to intercept the British and warn them to turn back, which the Company force then did.

Following these events, the Caliph's attitude toward the British became increasingly hostile. In 1900, he formally suspended relations with the RNC and attempted to shut down its military garrisons and posts within his territory. Despite this, Frederick Lugard proclaimed the establishment of the Northern Nigeria Protectorate in January 1900, after the British government took control of the company. Sokoto immediately rejected British claims to sovereignty over the Caliphate. When Caliph Abdurrahman received High Commissioner Lugard's "Proclamation", he read it aloud to his councilors and dismissed the messenger without a reply.

With the founding of the Protectorate and the arrival of reinforcements, many of whom had fought in the Anglo-Ashanti wars, Lugard set up his headquarters at Zungeru and began extending British authority further north from the Middle Niger. Following the "Proclamation", the emirate of Ilorin immediately accepted British rule, while Bida offered only limited resistance before its emir fled as British forces occupied the capital. By early 1902, the British had also captured Kontagora, Yola, Muri, Bauchi, Gombe, and Zaria. With these conquests, Lugard turned his attention to Kano and eventually Sokoto.

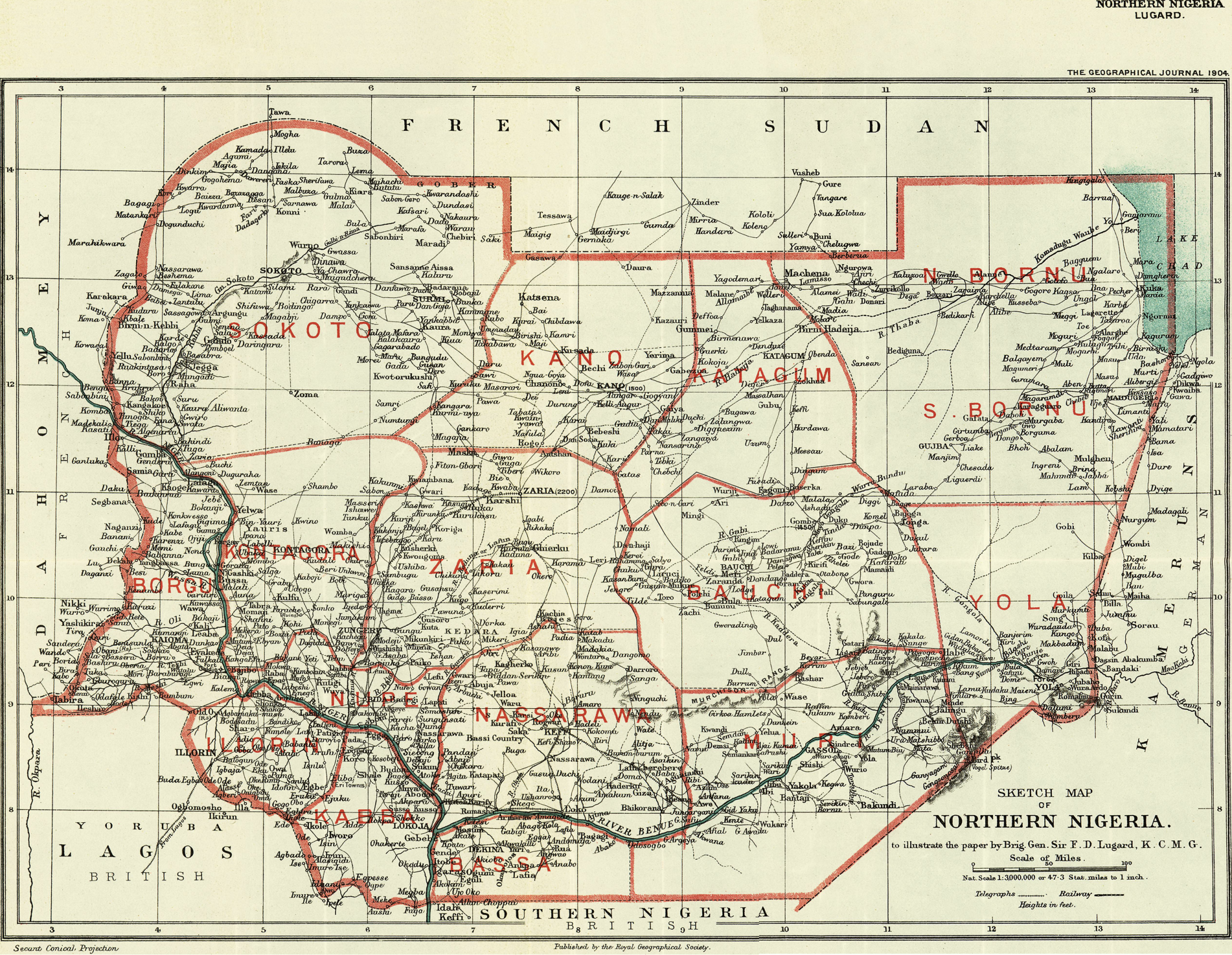
1904 sketch map of Northern Nigeria

In early 1901, the British attacked the emirate of Kontagora. Its emir Ibrahim Nagwamatse had resisted British authority in the Middle Niger region. The Northern Nigeria Regiment of the West African Frontier Force (WAFF) defeated the Kontagoran army and occupied its capital. Emir Ibrahim escaped capture and fled with his remaining forces, reportedly carrying out raids in the Zaria Emirate. The Emir of Zaria appealed to the Caliph to restrain Ibrahim but Sokoto failed to resolve the situation. As a result, Emir Muhammad Kwassau accepted Lugard's offer of military assistance against the fugitive emir. But even after Ibrahim was captured by British forces, they remained in Zaria and established a garrison outside the city. Despite the emir's objections, they also appointed a Resident. When Emir Muhammad refused to meet Lugard at Zungeru, the British arrested and exiled him.

After occupying Zaria, the WAFF attacked Kano in February 1903. Although Kano's defenders resisted, they were defeated and the emirate was subdued. However, the emir had already escaped to Sokoto with many of his chiefs and contingents, following the death of Caliph Abdurrahman in late 1902.

Opinions within the Caliphate were divided on how to respond to the growing British threat. Some officials supported armed resistance, though this faction diminished over time as more emirates were subdued by the British. Others supported mass hijra (migration) to Mecca, arguing that life under Christian rule would compromise their ability to practice Islam. The British repeatedly tried to reassure the rulers of the Caliphate on retaining the emirates' ruling dynasties in office and letting them carry on their religious duties very much as before, as was demonstrated in already occupied emirates. This policy, combined with the perceived futility of resistance, led many Sokoto officials to favour submission, hoping it would be temporary.

And when they received the news [about the capture of Kano] they discussed the matter amongst them. Some of them counselled peace with the whites, should they arrive, others favoured fighting and some resolved on migration. The amir al-muminin was inclined towards migration, and people began to prepare for the journey. They bought shoes, mules, donkeys and other necessary things. They even fixed the date of departure, but while thus engaged they suddenly heard that the whites had arrived. Thus the determination to depart gave way and fighting ensued.

— Muhammadu Junaidu, Waziri of Sokoto (1948–1997)

Caliph Abdurrahman, however, remained ready to meet the British aggression with force, motivated both by religious conviction and a belief that victory was still possible. In a letter sent to High Commissioner Frederick Lugard in May 1902, following the British occupation of Bauchi, he wrote: "Between us and you there are no dealings except as between Mussulmans and unbelievers, war, as God Almighty has enjoined on us." He added, "There is no power or strength save in God on high." Lugard interpreted the letter as a declaration of war but did not act immediately, believing the letter was not enough to justify an invasion to the Colonial Office.

Caliph Abdurrahman died in October 1902, and his death marked the end of the official resistance policy. His successor, Caliph Muhammadu Attahiru I, consulted his advisers and agreed to undertake a hijra. While preparations were underway, news arrived in Sokoto of the approach of a British force.

== Battle ==
After occupying Gwandu without resistance, the British force prepared for its advance on Sokoto by establishing a camp at Shagari on 10 March 1903. Commanded by British officers George Kemball and Thomas Morland, the expedition consisted of twenty-five officers, five non-commissioned officers, two medical officers and one medical NCO, sixty-eight gunners, 650 rank and file, 400 carriers, four Maxim guns, and four 75 mm artillery pieces.

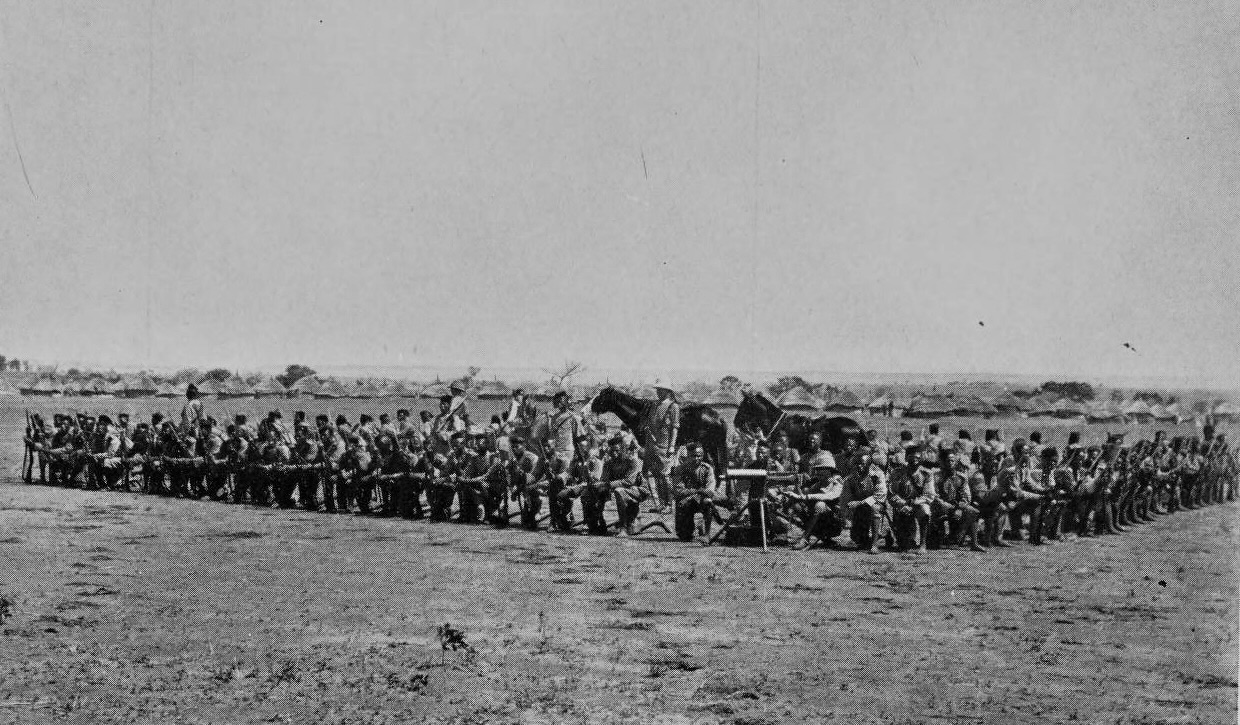
Square formation of the British WAFF

Early on 15 March 1903, the British column advanced on Sokoto. Upon reaching a ridge outside the city walls, they saw the Sokoto army, estimated at 2,000 cavalry and 4,000 infantry armed with spears, arrows, and old guns. Caliph Muhammadu Attahiru I commanded the centre, Ibrahim, Sarkin Rabah, on the left flank and Marafa Muhammadu Maiturare on the right.

The British advanced in square formation. Seeing this, the Majidadi, a slave official of Waziri Muhammadu Buhari, approached the Caliph to request the goron yaki (the "kola-nut of war"), signaling his intention to die in battle. He was following the example of his colleague the Shamaki, who had been killed in a skirmish with the British the previous day while deliberately seeking martyrdom. With the Caliph's approval, the Majidadi charged the approaching British forces alongside his young squire, who refused to leave him. Both were killed by machine gun fire.

As the British force continued its advance up the slope of the valley, Sokoto cavalry attacked from the flanks while an advance guard approached from the front. Within twenty minutes, the British Maxim guns repelled the assault, inflicting heavy casualties on the main body of the Sokoto forces. The surviving defenders regrouped around the Sokoto flag and fought to the last man before it was taken by a British officer. The flag was later reported stolen but was said to have been recovered after the Battle of Burmi.

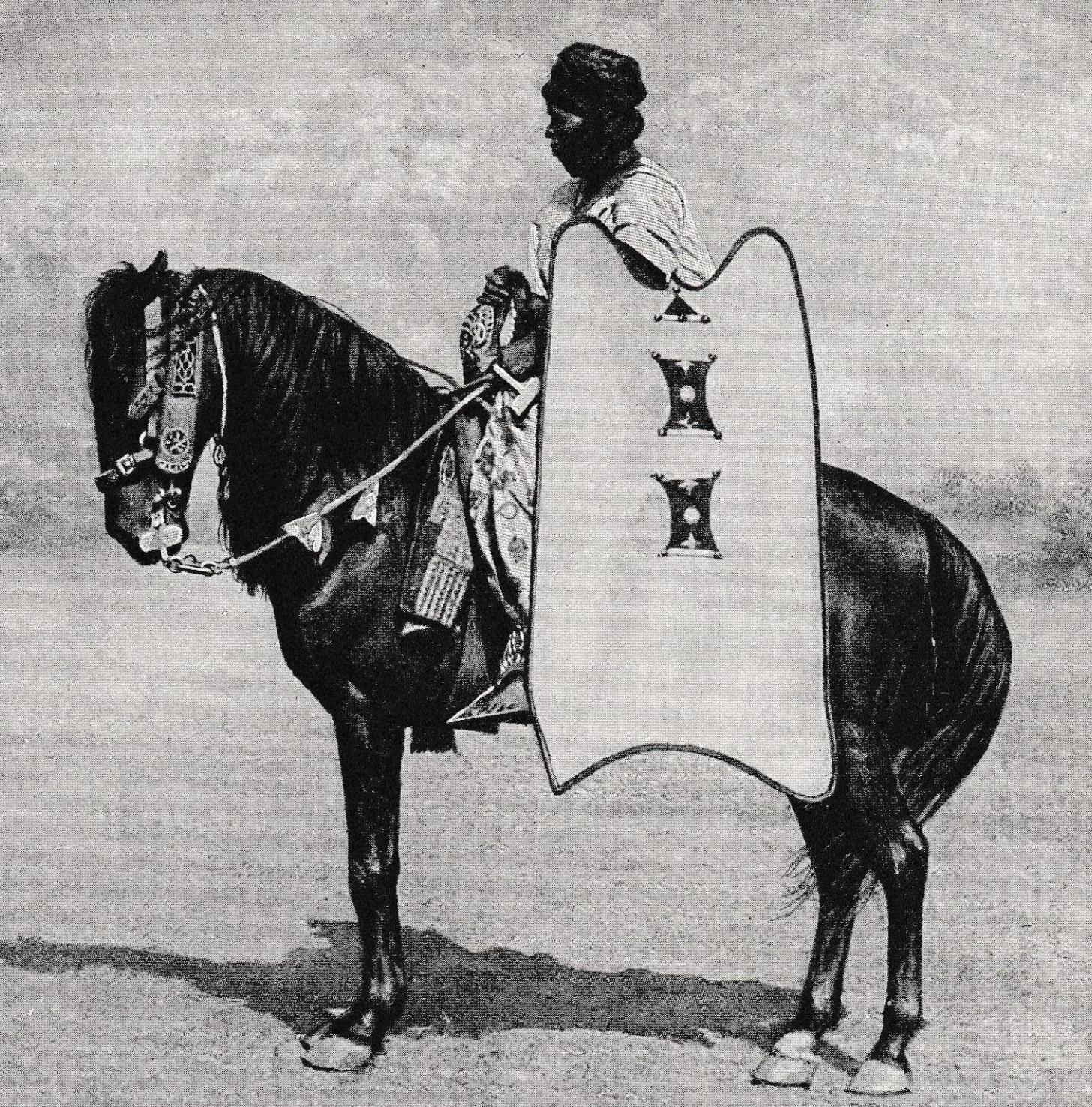
Sokoto cavalryman

The fighting lasted nearly two hours before the British broke the resistance and occupied the largely deserted city. Sokoto reportedly suffered about 100 killed, while British casualties included two carriers wounded and two soldiers severely wounded.

Following the city's fall, the whereabouts of Caliph Attahiru were initially unknown. Some days later, reports reached the city that he had embarked on a hijra to Mecca, increasing his following in each settlement he visited. A detailed account of the battle and the Caliph's withdrawal, recorded by the Majasirdi, a Sokoto official who participated in the fighting, was later compiled by the colonial officer and historian H. A. S. Johnston:

...The Marafa was an experienced soldier and he had soon seen that our horsemen could not fight against guns. He had therefore galloped over to the Sultan and urged him to abandon the battle. What he had actually said was: 'Don't let the torch go out while you are holding it. By this he had meant that if the Sultan persisted he would be risking the destruction of Sokoto and Shehu's line.

But the Sultan had not welcomed this advice and had said angrily: 'Do you think that this is my first battle? Leave it to me, will you.' The Marafa had then remounted his horse but it had immediately been shot under him. He had mounted another but that too had been brought down. Finally, he himself had been hit in the shoulder.

Meanwhile the fire round the Sultan had been growing hotter. Shells had been falling all round the palm-tree and the Sa'i Umaru and his standard-bearers had all been mown down by the machine-guns. At this the Waziri Buhari had spoken up. 'God give you long life' he had said to the Sultan 'from now on the blood of all those who are killed will be on your head.' Attahiru had still been unwilling to quit but when he had heard this he had let his slaves lead his horse away.

By the time that I got back to where the Sultan had had his headquarters he and his bodyguard had gone. But the dead were lying thick round the fan-palm and among them I found my own father.

Why do you say that you are sorry? Were his days not fulfilled?

== Aftermath ==
On 19 March 1903, High Commissioner Frederick Lugard arrived in Sokoto and installed Muhammadu Attahiru II as Sultan with greatly reduced powers limited to Sokoto Province under the Northern Nigeria Protectorate. British forces continued to pursue the fugitive Caliph and his followers, culminating in the Battle of Burmi in July 1903, where Caliph Attahiru I was killed, ending the century-long Sokoto Caliphate.
