= Charles Marsh =

Charles Marsh may refer to:

- Charles Marsh (American politician) (1765–1849), American congressman from Vermont
- Charles Marsh (barrister) (1774–1835), English MP and lawyer
- Charles Marsh (railroad builder) (1825–1876), American railroad builder, instrumental in the transcontinental railroad
- C. Carroll Marsh (Charles Carroll Marsh, 1829–after 1863), American Civil War Union colonel
- Charles H. Marsh (1840–1867), American Civil War Union soldier and Medal of Honor recipient
- Charles Dwight Marsh (1855–1932), American botanist
- Charles E. Marsh (1887–1964), American newspaper publisher; founder of the Public Welfare Foundation
- Charles Marsh (1893–1953), American actor who appeared in Cloak and Dagger
- Charles F. Marsh (1903–1984), American economist and educator
- Charles R. Marsh, American professor of religious studies and 2009 recipient of a Guggenheim Fellowship

== See also ==
- Othniel Charles Marsh (1831–1899), American paleontologist
- Charles Marsh Schomberg (1779–1835), British naval officer and colonial governor
- Charlotte Marsh (1887–1961), known as Charlie Marsh, English suffragette and organiser
