= Tomb of Muhammadu Attahiru I =

Nigerian Tourist Center

The tomb of Muhammad Attahiru I, the 12th Sultan of Sokoto, who ruled between October 1902 to March 1903 was once an attractive tourist centre. The tomb is located in Mbormi, four kilometres from Bajoga, Gombe State, Nigeria.

== History ==
In 1903, the Sokoto Caliphate, under sultan Muhammad Attahiru I, protested against the arrival of British troops in the area. The sultan decided to leave Sokoto for Medina and he eventually stopped at Mbormi to make use of the advantage of its defensive walls to fight the British Army. A war that led to the end of his reign. The town of Mbormi had been deserted from the day Sultan Atahiru I and his two sons were killed in an intense battle fought by the trio and their over 600 followers against the British forces. The town of Mbormi was razed by the British, and the site is now farmland, except for a fenced enclosure containing the tomb as well as the burial sites of the chief imam of Sokoto and Major Francis Charles Marsh, who died in the battle. The town is popularly known now as Mbormi Battle Ground
