= Alice Marsh =

American socialite and political hostess; mistress of President Lyndon B. Johnson

- Marsh in c. 1940
- Born: Alice Glass; October 11, 1911; Lott, Texas, U.S.
- Died: December 9, 1976 (aged 65); Marlin, Texas, U.S.
- Education: Texas Christian University; Columbia University
- Known for: Mistress to U.S. President Lyndon B. Johnson
- Political party: Democratic
- Spouse: Charles E. Marsh (m. 1940; div. 1949) Palmer Weber (divorced) Zadel Skolovsky (divorced) Robert Lester (divorced) Richard J. Kirkpatrick (m. 1959; died 1974)
- Children: 2

Alice Glass Kirkpatrick (October 11, 1911 – December 9, 1976), best known as Alice Marsh, was an American socialite and political hostess who was the long-time mistress of U.S. President Lyndon B. Johnson. Their affair began in 1938 and ended in the 1960s due to Marsh's disagreement with Johnson's policy regarding the Vietnam War. Throughout this period, they were both married to other people (Johnson to Lady Bird Johnson and Marsh, starting in 1940, to several successive men) but they continued to have an ongoing intimate relation, although their sexual relation may have ceased.

== Early life ==
She was born in Lott, Texas, the daughter of Judith (née Ligon) and George Glass. She also had a sister Mary Louise Glass. She grew up and attended high school in Marlin, Texas and attended Texas Christian University and Columbia University.

== First marriage and meeting LBJ ==
After graduating from Columbia, Glass moved to Austin, Texas where she worked as a secretary to state senator William R. Poage. In 1931, at a party, she met Charles E. Marsh, the powerful publisher of the Austin American-Statesman newspaper in Texas. Marsh was married and twenty-four years her senior; despite this, Glass became his mistress. Marsh reportedly showered her with gifts. Glass's cousin said: "The first time she came back to Marlin and walked down the street in her New York clothes and her jewels, women came running out of the shops to stare at her."

While Marsh was still married, Glass gave birth to two children: a daughter, Diana and a son, Michael. Marsh left his wife and the couple moved in together at a home he had built specifically for her called Longlea, in Boston, Virginia. However, Glass refused to marry Marsh until 1940.

During her affair with Marsh, Glass met Lyndon B. Johnson, a first-term Congressman from Texas, when he first came to Longlea in 1937; Marsh was a patron and supporter of Johnson. Glass was reportedly immediately attracted to Johnson. Robert Caro, Johnson's biographer, said of their first meeting: "She believed that he was unlike the other politicians who came to Longlea, and whose conversation revealed, before a weekend was over, that their only interest was personal advancement... She believed that she had finally met a politician who was not constantly scheming on behalf of his ambition, a politician whose dreams were for others rather than for himself."

By 1938, the two began an affair. One acquaintance said: "They were unbelievably discreet and no one could have guessed that they were lovers. Nothing showed. Nothing at all." Whenever Marsh was out, she and Johnson would spend time together at Longlea. When Marsh was home, Johnson brought along his wife Lady Bird Johnson.

According to her sister Mary, the reason Alice refused to marry Marsh was because she wanted to marry Johnson, claiming that "Lyndon was the love of Alice's life. My sister was mad for Lyndon — absolutely mad for him." However, in 1939, Marsh discovered their affair. Glass had been unfaithful before but her affair with Johnson, whom Marsh had helped get elected, infuriated him and he threw him out of the house after berating him.

Johnson later came back and asked for Marsh's forgiveness, promising to discontinue his affair with Glass. Marsh forgave him. Marsh's daughter Antoinette commented on Marsh and Johnson's relationship: "They didn't let her come between them. Men in power like that don't give a damn about women. They were not that important in the end. They treated women like toys. That's just the way it was."

Soon afterwards, Alice finally agreed to marry Marsh. After their marriage, the couple moved to Washington where they purchased a stately four-story house at 2136 R Street in Dupont Circle. However, their marriage was rocky and with affairs on both sides, finally ending in divorce in 1949.

== Relationship with Johnson ==
Caro would later say of the relationship between Marsh and Johnson: "He had a lot of affairs, but none of them seemed to have any impact or significance for the way he ran - for his professional life. They didn't seem to mean much to him. But all of a sudden, I discovered there was one affair that he had for a long time, perhaps 25 years... She was valuable to him because he relied on her political advice, and no one had ever heard of her. Her name was Alice Marsh."

Marsh was known for her beauty. Lady Bird Johnson called her a "Valkyrie". One friend of hers described her as: "Almost six foot in her bare feet, she was slim, graceful, and startlingly beautiful with delicate features, wide-set blue eyes, and strawberry-blond hair that cascaded past her shoulders."

Their physical relationship ended with her marriage but the two continued a long-time emotional affair and correspondence. Caro stated that Lady Bird Johnson was aware of their relationship and tolerated it. She told Caro that Glass played a huge role in Johnson's political career, advising him to re-run for the House of Representatives rather than run for the Senate or on what to wear – reportedly she told him to wear French cuffs as they suited his long arms – and about policies. Lady Bird also admitted that "she helped educate Lyndon and me, particularly about music and a more elegant lifestyle than he and I spent our early days enjoying".

Their relationship finally ended over a heated disagreement over Johnson's policies on the Vietnam War which she considered one of "history's horrors." She reportedly burned the love letters Johnson had written her because she "didn't want her granddaughter to know she had been associated with the man [she] considered responsible for the Vietnam War."

== Later life ==
After her marriage with Marsh, Alice went on to marry four more times. Her second marriage to Palmer Weber was brief and ended in divorce. Her third husband, Zadel Skolovsky, was a concert pianist. Her fourth husband, Robert Lester, was a Korean War veteran. Her fifth and final marriage was to Colonel Richard J. Kirkpatrick in 1959 and lasted until his death in 1974.

A few months before her death, she moved back to Marlin, Texas, where she died of cancer on December 9, 1976.
