= Charles E. Marsh =

American newspaper publisher

- Born: January 7, 1887; Cincinnati, Ohio, U.S.
- Died: December 30, 1964 (aged 77); Washington, D.C., U.S.
- Education: Haverford College; University of Oklahoma (B.A.)
- Occupation: Newspaper owner
- Political party: Democratic
- Spouse: Leona Johns (m. 1911; div. 1935) Alice Glass (m. 1940; div. 1949) Claudia Haines (m. 1953)
- Children: 5

Charles Edward Marsh (January 7, 1887 – December 30, 1964) was an American newspaper publisher who owned several newspapers in Texas and also founded the Public Welfare Foundation. He was a supporter and mentor of President Lyndon B. Johnson and helped him get his political career started.

== Early life ==
Marsh was born in Hartwell, Cincinnati, Ohio, one of six children. His father was a lawyer who left his wife and children. Charles' mother took them to Coalgate, Oklahoma (then still Oklahoma Territory), where he attended school and later worked in the coaling mining industry. In 1906, Charles enrolled in Haverford College in Pennsylvania before transferring to the University of Oklahoma to be nearer to his mother.

== Career ==
After graduating college, Marsh worked as a newspaper reporter in Oklahoma before going to Ohio where he joined the Cleveland Press and then went on to become an editor at The Cincinnati Post in 1911. In 1914, he was appointed editor of the Des Moines News. By then, Marsh had grown frustrated with interference from newspaper owners. In 1916, along with Ephraim Silas Fentress, he purchased the Fargo Forum. The owner of a conservative newspaper was upset by Marsh's liberal views and bought the newspaper from the pair. The sale turned in a profit for the men.

Marsh and Fentress then went Waco, Texas where they purchased the Waco Morning News and the Waco Tribune, merging and renaming them the Waco News-Tribune. They subsequently bought numerous newspapers in cities and towns across Texas, including: Austin, Wichita Falls, Corpus Christi, Brownsville, Cisco, Cleburne, Eastland, Laredo, McAllen, Paris, Port Arthur, and Texarkana. This was a profitable venture and both men became millionaires.

Robert Caro said of Marsh: "Having made money, he liked to play the patron with it. A tall man - six-feet-three - he had the broad, high forehead and the beaked nose of a Roman emperor, and a manner to match. Tips headwaiters were dispensed with a gesture reminiscent of a king tossing coins to subjects." Welly Kennon Hopkins, a Texas politician supported by Marsh described him as: "A great manipulator behind the scenes... He would have liked to have been a little William Randolph Hearst, because he got into very much of a newspaper broker position."

Marsh was a strong supporter of President Franklin D. Roosevelt and the New Deal and close friends with many people on the left wing of the Democratic Party. In 1936, he supported Lyndon B. Johnson, then a candidate for Texas 10th Congressional District, when told that Johnson was a passionate "New Dealer". Marsh met Johnson for the first time in May 1937 and they became close friends.

== Personal life ==
Marsh was married three times. He married his first wife, Leona Johns, in 1911 and had three children: Charles Jr., John, and Antoinette. While they were still married, in 1931, he began an affair with Alice Glass, who was nineteen years old and twenty-four years his junior. Alice gave birth to two children, Diana and Michael, before they married in 1940.

Before their marriage, Alice Marsh also began a long-term affair with then-Congressman Lyndon B. Johnson, the discovery of which led to their marriage; up until then, she had turned down his proposals. Johnson promised to end his relationship with Alice and Alice, in return, accepted Marsh's proposal. The marriage was rocky, however, with infidelity on both sides. They divorced in 1949.

Marsh's third marriage, to Claudia Haines, at one time his secretary, lasted from 1953 until his death in Washington, D.C. in December 1964; they had no children together. Claudia was the president of the Public Welfare Foundation between 1952 and 1974 and survived her husband for thirty-six years, dying at the age of 100 in 2000.
