= Sokoto Caliphate =

Islamic state in West Africa (1804–1903)

Coordinates: 13°04′02″N 05°14′52″E

Sokoto Caliphate: دَوْلَارْ خَلِيڢرْ سَݣَُوتُواْ (Hausa); Daular Khalifar Sakkwato; دَوْلَةُ الخِلَافَة فَي بِلَاد السُودَان (Arabic); Dawlatu'l-Khilāfah fī Bilād as-Sūdān
- 1804–1903
- Flag

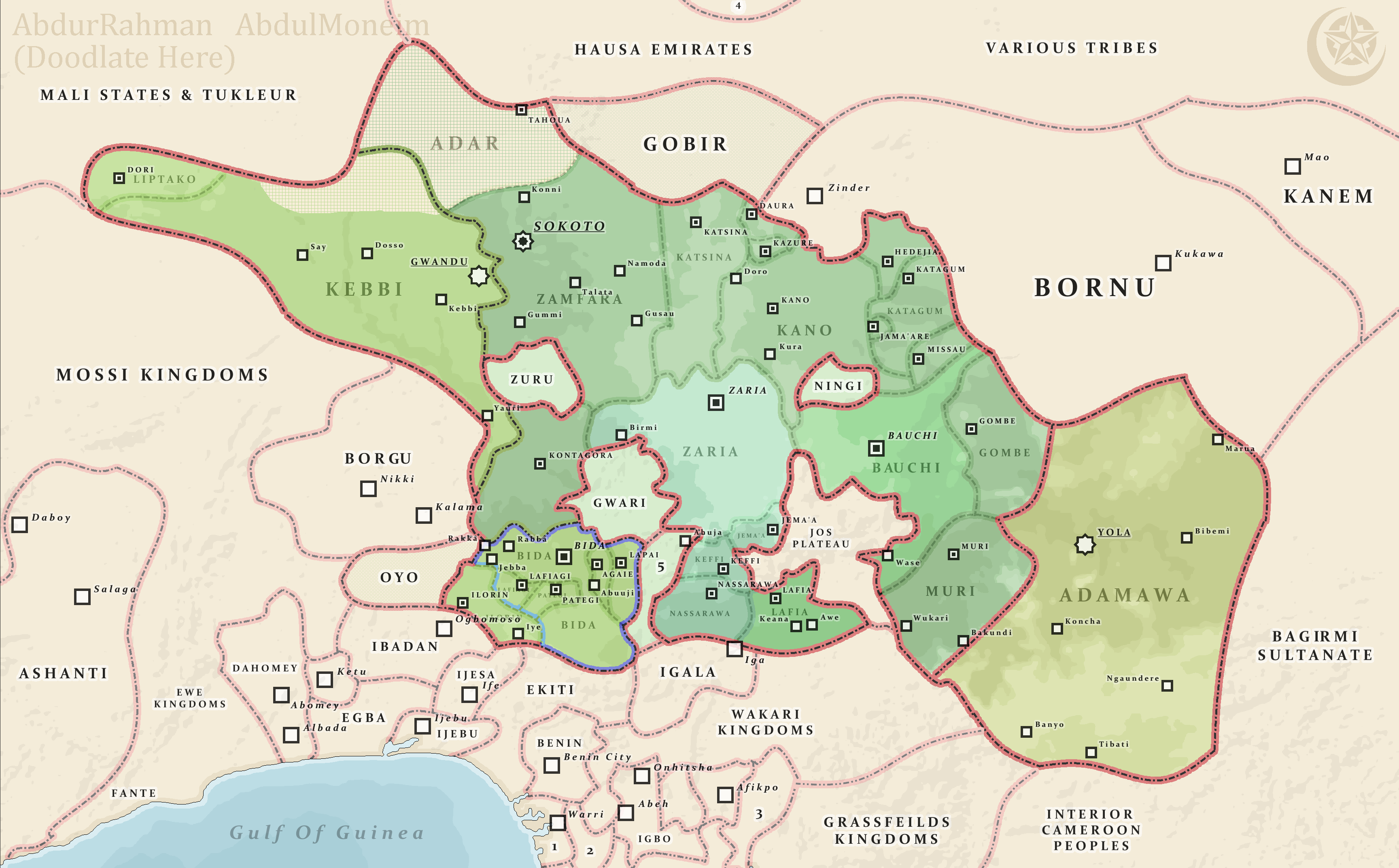
- Map of the Sokoto Caliphate in 1870
- Capital: Eastern territories: Sokoto (1808–1850, 1851–1902); Birnin Konni (1850); Burmi (1903); Western territories: Gwandu (1808–1811, 1817–1860, 1876–1903); Bodinga (1811–1817); Ambursa (1860–1876)
- Official languages: Arabic
- Common languages: Hausa; Fulfulde
- Religion: Sunni Islam
- Government: Sarauta-Caliphate
- Caliph / Amir al-Mu'minin
  - 1804–1817: Usman dan Fodio (first)
  - 1902–1903: Muhammadu Attahiru (last)
- Grand Vizier
  - 1804–1817: Abdullahi dan Fodio (first)
  - 1886–1903: Muhammadu al-Bukhari (last)
- Legislature: Shura
- Historical era: Fula jihads
  - Founded: 21 February 1804
  - Fall of Alkalawa: 3 October 1808
  - Battle of Burmi: 27 July 1903

Area
- 1900: 488,500 km^{2} (188,600 sq mi)
- Currency: Various (no official): Cowrie; Thaler; Dirham
Preceded by
Sultanate of Kano
Sultanate of Katsina
Sultanate of Gobir
Sultanate of Zazzau
Bornu Empire
Sultanate of Damagaram
Jukun Kingdoms
Kebbi Sultanate
Nupe Kingdom
Dendi Kingdom
Sultanate of Agadez
Tuareg Oligarchy
Sultanate of Zamfara
Sultanate of Yauri
Succeeded by
Northern Nigeria Protectorate
German Kamerun
French West Africa
Sokoto Sultanate Council

The Sokoto Caliphate (Arabic: دولة الخلافة في بلاد السودان, literally: Caliphate in the Lands of Sudan), also known as the Sultanate of Sokoto, was a Sunni Muslim caliphate in West Africa. It was founded by Usman dan Fodio in 1804 during the Fulani jihads after defeating the Hausa Kingdoms in the Fulani War. The boundaries of the caliphate extended to parts of present-day Cameroon, Burkina Faso, Niger, and Nigeria. By 1837, the Caliphate had a population of 10–20 million people, becoming the most populous empire in West Africa. It was dissolved when the British, French, and Germans conquered the area in 1903 and annexed it into the newly established Northern Nigeria Protectorate, Senegambia and Niger and Kamerun (the latter during the Adamawa Wars) respectively.

The caliphate emerged after the Hausa King Yunfa attempted to assassinate Usman Dan Fodio in 1802. To escape persecution, Usman and his followers migrated towards Gudu in February 1804. Usman's followers pledged allegiance to Usman as the Commander of the Faithful (Amīr al-Muʾminīn). By 1808, the Sokoto Caliphate had gained control over Hausaland and several surrounding states. Under the sixth caliph Ahmadu Rufai, the state reached its maximum extent, covering a large swath of West Africa. In 1903, the twelfth and last caliph Attahiru was assassinated by British forces, marking the end of the caliphate.

Developed in the context of multiple independent Hausa Kingdoms, at its peak, the caliphate linked over 30 different emirates and 10–20+ million people in the largest independent polity in the continent at the time. According to historian John Iliffe, Sokoto was "the most prosperous region in tropical Africa". The caliphate was a loose confederation of emirates that recognized the suzerainty of the Amir al-Mu'minin, the Sultan of Sokoto.

Slaves worked plantations and much of the population converted to Islam. By 1900, Sokoto had "at least 1 million and perhaps as many as 2.5 million slaves" behind only the American South (which had four million in 1860) and perhaps Brazil (1.7–2.5 million) among all modern slave societies. Jan Stafford Hogendorn and Paul Ellsworth Lovejoy writes that "Our own estimate is based on the assumption that slaves constituted between a quarter and a half of the population of the Caliphate, which certainly numbered many millions and perhaps as many as 10 million."

Although European colonists abolished the political authority of the caliphate, the title of sultan was retained and remains an important religious position for Sunni Muslims in the region to the current day. Usman Dan Fodio's jihad inspired a series of related jihads in other parts of the Sudanian Savanna and the Sahel far beyond the borders of what is now Nigeria that led to the foundation of Islamic states in the regions that are now in modern-day Senegal, Mali, Ivory Coast, Chad, the Central African Republic, and Sudan.

The legacy of the Sokoto Caliphate and Usman dan Fodio's teachings have left a lasting impact on the region's history, including contemporary Nigeria and other parts of West Africa. The Sokoto era produced some of the most renowned writers in West Africa with the three main reformist leaders, Usman, Abdullahi and Bello, writing more than three hundred books combined on a wide variety of topics, including logic, tafsir, mathematics, governance, law, astronomy, grammar, medicine, and so on. Some other famous scholars of that era were Shaikh Dan Tafa and Nana Asma'u. All of these scholars are still being widely studied around West Africa and some as far as the Middle East.

== Nomenclature ==
Throughout the 19th century, the Islamic state founded by Usman dan Fodio had no fixed name. In Hausa, the local lingua franca, it was sometimes referred to as daular 'Uthmaniyya ("Uthmani state"), not to be confused with the Ottoman state, the original daular 'uthmaniyya. Usman and his successors, who ruled from Sokoto, used the title of Commander of the Believers (Amir al-mu'minin in Arabic; Sarkin Musulmi in Hausa; Lamido Julbe in Fulfulde). The townspeople of the capital, Sokoto, were known as Kadirawa, followers of the Qadiriyya Sufi order.

Following the British conquest of Sokoto, the British colonist appointed Muhammad Attahiru II as Emir of the newly established Sokoto Emirate, indicating the loss of sovereign powers over the other emirs and his subordination to the governor. Unlike other Native emirs in the region, however, he was given the courtesy title of Sultan. The title was never used in the 19th century and was only reserved for subordinate rulers, such as the later emirs of Kano and Zaria, both major, wealthy cities answerable to the caliph at Sokoto.

In post-colonial Nigeria during the 1960s, the label "Sokoto Caliphate" was introduced by Murray Last and became the most widely accepted name. According to Last, the term was influenced by the work of Professor Abdullahi Smith, Head of the History Department at Ahmadu Bello University, Zaria. Smith had liked to use the term 'caliphate' when teaching the history of Usman's state. When Last titled his 1966 PhD dissertation "The Sokoto Caliphate", his supervisor Smith preferred "The Caliphate of Sokoto", but the shorter "Sokoto Caliphate" (Daular Sakkwato in Hausa) became more widely adopted. Last explained his reasoning:

The decision to relabel the historical state whose capital was at Sokoto was partly intellectual, partly political: intellectual, because we needed a properly Islamic term for a properly Islamic state (and a term that could be justified both on textual evidence and on a technical legal rationale); political, because the newly autonomous regional government of Northern Nigeria needed a model on which to base its new political morality of "work and worship."

Some scholars contest this rationale and continue to use old terms like Fulani Empire (l'empire peul in French). The relabelling by Last and Smith reflected an interpretation of Usman's jihad as a religious movement and, thus of Sokoto as an Islamic state, rather than as an 'empire' as was common among colonial British writers. The assumption was that an 'empire' was a political system in which one 'race,' 'nationality' or 'tribe' dominated other groups, and excluded them from government. The interpretation of the movement as an 'ethnic' revolution by the Fulani was mainly based on the fact that all but one of the new emirs were indeed Fulani. However, the prevailing view among scholars is that Usman's movement was primarily religious. The early emirs were chosen on their piety as Muslim scholars, and they were expected to provide proper Islamic governance.

== History ==
=== Background ===
The major power in the region in the 17th and 18th centuries had been the Bornu Empire. However, revolutions and the rise of new powers decreased the power of the Bornu empire and by 1759 its rulers had lost control over the oasis town of Bilma and access to the Trans-Saharan trade. Vassal cities of the empire gradually became autonomous, and the result by 1780 was a political array of independent states in the region.

The fall of the Songhai Empire in 1591 to Morocco also had freed much of the central Bilad as-Sudan, and a number of Hausa sultanates led by different Hausa aristocracies had grown to fill the void. Three of the most significant to develop were the sultanates of Gobir, Kebbi (both in the Rima River valley), and Zamfara, all in present-day Nigeria. These kingdoms engaged in regular warfare against each other, especially in conducting slave raids. In order to pay for the constant warfare, they imposed high taxes on their citizens.

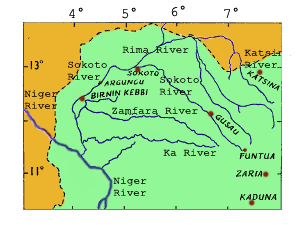
The Sokoto-Rima river system

The region between the Niger River and Lake Chad was largely populated with the Fulani, the Hausa, and other ethnic groups that had immigrated to the area such as the Tuareg.

Much of the population had converted to Islam in the centuries before; however, local pagan beliefs persisted in many areas, especially in the aristocracy. In the end of the 1700s, an increase in Islamic preaching occurred throughout the Hausa kingdoms. A number of the preachers were linked in a shared Tariqa of Islamic study. Maliki scholars were invited or traveled to the Hausa lands from the Maghreb and joined the courts of some sultanates such as in Kano. These scholars preached a return to adherence to Islamic tradition. The most important of these scholars is Muhammad al-Maghili, who brought the Maliki jurisprudence to Nigeria

=== Fulani Jihad ===
Usman dan Fodio, an Islamic scholar and an urbanized Fulani, had been actively educating and preaching in the city of Gobir with the approval and support of the Hausa leadership of the city. However, when Yunfa, a former student of dan Fodio, became the sultan of Gobir, he restricted dan Fodio's activities, eventually forcing him into exile in Gudu. A large number of people left Gobir to join dan Fodio, who also began to gather new supporters from other regions. Feeling threatened by his former teacher, Sultan Yunfa declared war on dan Fodio on 21 February 1804.

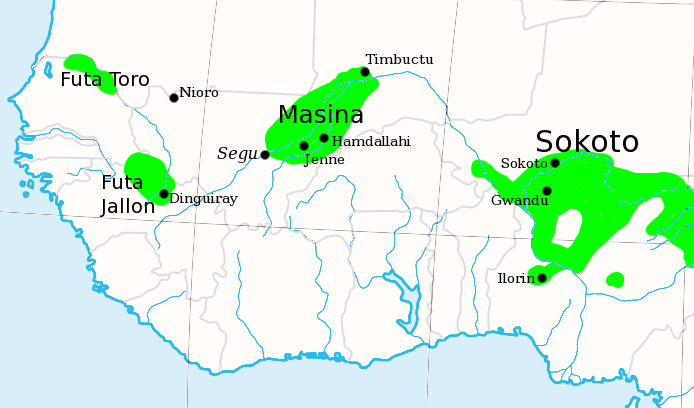
The Fulani jihad states of West Africa, c. 1830

Usman dan Fodio was elected as the "Commander of the Faithful" (Amir al-Mu'minin) by his followers, marking the beginning of the Sokoto state. Usman dan Fodio then created a number of flag bearers amongst those following him, creating an early political structure of the empire. Declaring a jihad against the Hausa kings, dan Fodio rallied his primarily Fulani "warrior-scholars" against Gobir. Despite early losses at the Battle of Tsuntua and elsewhere, the forces of dan Fodio began taking over some key cities starting in 1805. The Fulani used guerrilla warfare to turn the conflict in their favor, and gathered support from the civilian population, which had come to resent the despotic rule and high taxes of the Hausa kings. Even some non-Muslim Fulani started to support dan Fodio. The war lasted from 1804 until 1808 and resulted in thousands of deaths. The forces of dan Fodio were able to capture the states of Katsina and Daura, the important kingdom of Kano in 1807, and finally conquered Gobir in 1809. In the same year, Muhammed Bello, the son of dan Fodio, founded the city of Sokoto, which became the capital of the Sokoto state.

The jihad had created "a new slaving frontier on the basis of rejuvenated Islam." By 1900, the Sokoto state had "at least 1 million and perhaps as many as 2.5 million slaves", second only to the United States (which had 4 million in 1860) in size among all modern slave societies.

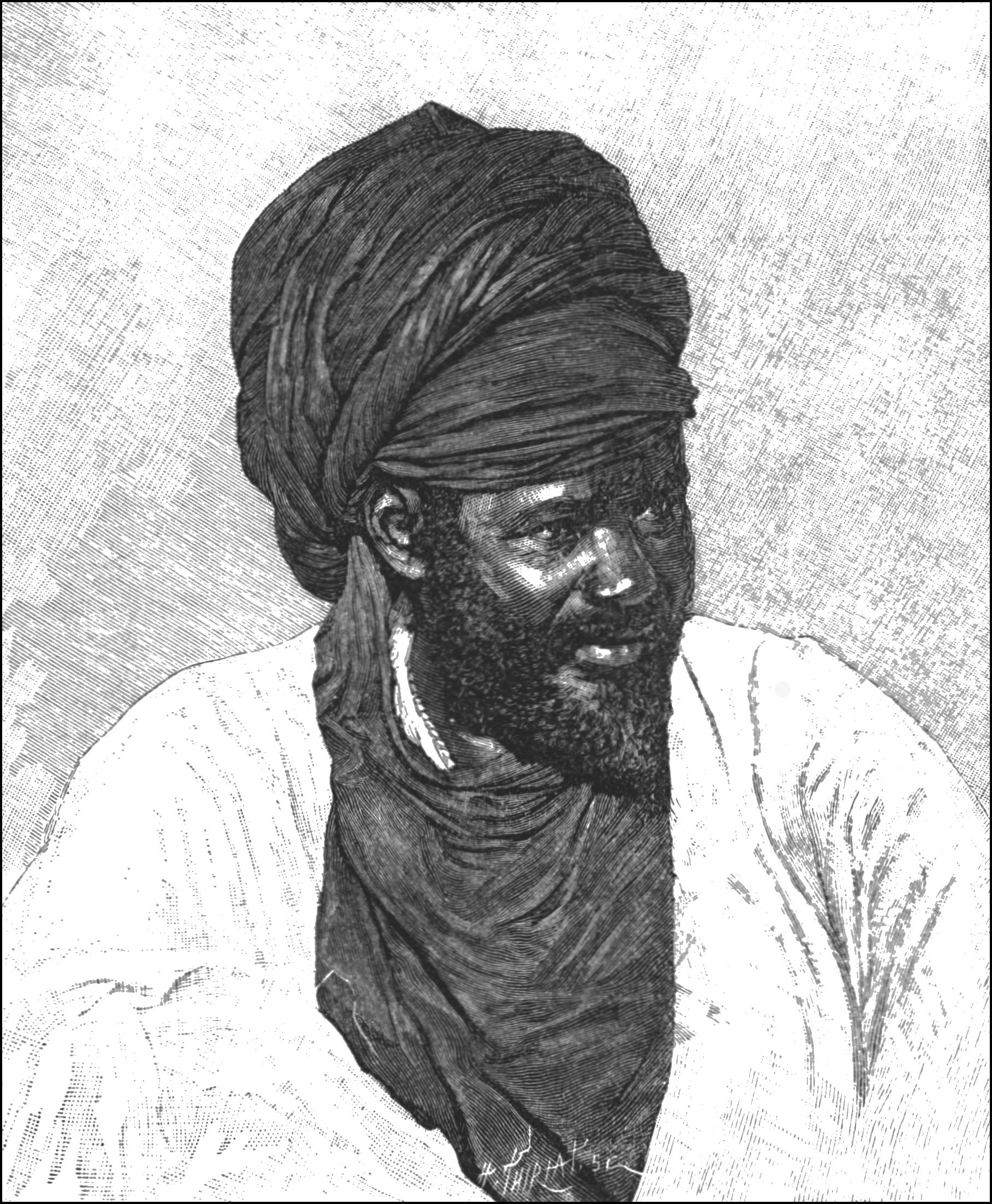
A brother of Sultan Umaru bin Ali (1888) by Élisée Reclus

=== Notable Flag-Bearers of the Caliphate and their Emirates ===
Name	Emirate
Abdullahi dan Fodio	Gwandu Emirate
Umar Dallaji	Katsina Emirate
Suleiman dan Abu Hamma	Kano Emirate
Yaqubu dan Dadi	Bauchi Emirate
Ishaq	Daura Emirate
Musa ibn Suleiman Ibn Muhammad	Zazzau Emirate
Ibrahim Zakiyul Kalbi	Katagum Emirate
Modibbo Adama	Adamawa Lamidate
Buba Yero	Gombe Emirate
Shehu Alimi	Ilorin Emirate
Mallam Dendo	Nupe Emirate

=== Expansion of the Sokoto Caliphate ===
From 1808 until the mid-1830s, the Sokoto state expanded, gradually annexing the plains to the west and key parts of Yorubaland. It became one of the largest states in Africa, stretching from modern-day Burkina Faso to Cameroon and including most of northern Nigeria and southern Niger. At its height, the Sokoto state included over 30 different emirates under its political structure. The political structure of the state was organized with the Sultan of Sokoto ruling from the city of Sokoto (and for a brief period under Muhammad Bello from Wurno). The leader of each emirate was appointed by the sultan as the flag-bearer for that city but was given wide independence and autonomy. Much of the growth of the state occurred through the establishment of an extensive system of ribats as part of the consolidation policy of Muhammed Bello, the second Sultan. Ribats were established, founding a number of new cities with walled fortresses, schools, markets, and other buildings. These proved crucial in expansion through developing new cities, settling the pastoral Fulani people, and supporting the growth of plantations which were vital to the economy.

The expansion of the Sokoto Caliphate had significant impacts on local populations. In many cases, conquered peoples were assimilated into the Caliphate, adopting Islam and becoming part of the Caliphate's political and social structures. In other cases, communities resisted the Caliphate's rule, leading to conflicts and tensions that sometimes persisted for years. The most significant impact was the spread of Islam among the local populations. The Sokoto Caliphate was intensely Islamic, and it actively sought to convert the peoples of the territories it conquered. As a result, Islam became the dominant religion in the region, with profound implications for local cultures, legal systems, and social norms. The imposition of Islamic law (Sharia) brought about changes in areas such as property rights, marriage, and criminal justice. Not all local populations accepted the Caliphate's rule, and there were instances of resistance. Some communities maintained their traditional religions and practices despite the Caliphate's efforts to enforce Islam. There were also armed rebellions against the Caliphate's rule, some of which were successful in achieving local autonomy.

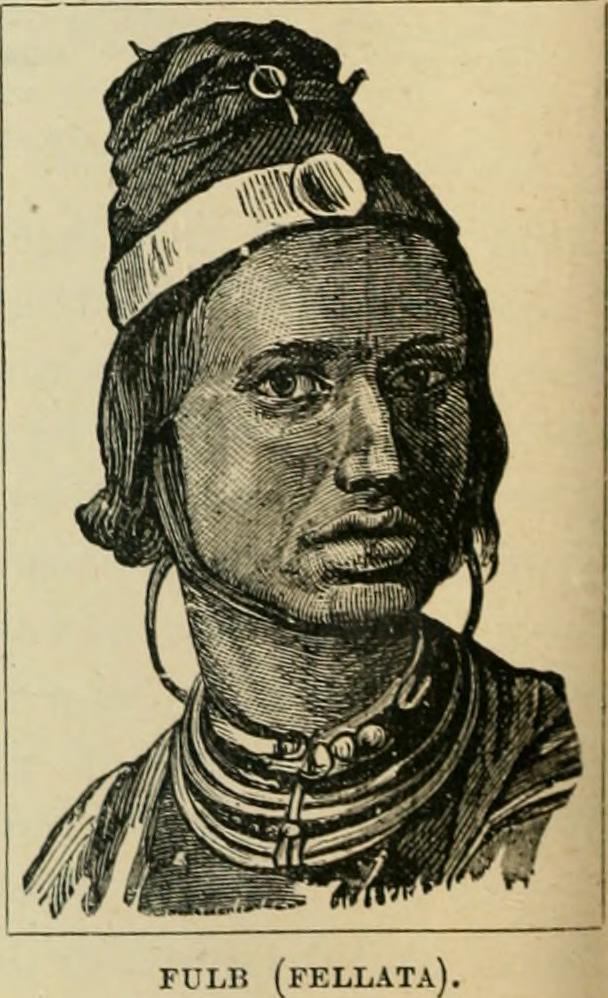
A Fulani from the Sokoto Caliphate

The expansion of the Sokoto Caliphate can be understood as a three-stage process. Initially, from 1804 to 1808, the consolidation of power occurred in Gobir and the neighboring Hausa states. The successful military campaigns against these rulers won him considerable support, establishing the foundation for the forthcoming expansion. The second stage (1809–1815) marked the eastward and southward expansion, reaching the Bornu Empire and Yorubaland. Dan Fodio and his lieutenants led a series of jihads, framed as a battle against un-Islamic practices. The success of these jihads was due not only to military prowess, but he appealed to the Fulani through the desire for conquest and enslavement of the polytheists. The Fulani were instrumental in the expansion of the Caliphate. The final stage (1815–1840) involved further consolidation and minor campaigns against resistant elements. By this time, the Caliphate had grown into one of the largest empires in Africa, extending over present-day northern Nigeria, parts of Niger, Cameroon, and Benin.

This expansion led to profound changes on local populations. The spread of Islam was a significant outcome, transforming the religious landscape of the region. Islamic law was imposed, affecting local customs and norms, especially concerning property rights, marriage, and criminal justice. This religious influence continues to shape the socio-cultural dynamics of the region. Moreover, the Caliphate's administrative and social structures were imposed on conquered territories. The Caliphate established a system of emirates, with appointed emirs overseeing local governance. The social hierarchy saw the Sultan and the ruling elite at the top, followed by free Muslims, non-Muslims, and slaves. This system significantly altered the political fabric of the region.

==== Into the Nupe Kingdom ====
The Nupe Kingdom, historically a powerful state in Central Nigeria, was conquered by the Sokoto Caliphate in the early 19th century as part of its expansionist campaigns. The Sokoto forces, under the leadership of Usman dan Fodio's brother, Abdullahi dan Fodio, advanced towards the Nupe Kingdom c. 1806. The Nupe Kingdom, under the rule of Etsu Majiya II, was a prosperous state known for its military prowess. However, the kingdom was internally divided due to succession disputes and other political tensions. Abdullahi dan Fodio exploited these internal divisions and launched a military campaign against the Nupe Kingdom. Despite the initial resistance, the Nupe Kingdom was eventually defeated. Etsu Majiya II was killed in battle, and the kingdom fell to the Sokoto forces c. 1808. After the conquest, the Sokoto Caliphate established the Bida Emirate in the Nupe Kingdom. The Caliphate appointed a local Fulani leader, known Mallam Dendo, as the emir, who ruled on behalf of the Sultan of Sokoto. The emir was expected to enforce Islamic law and pay tribute to the Sultan. The conquest of the Nupe Kingdom had significant impacts on the region. Islam became the dominant religion, and the Arabic script was introduced for writing the local Nupe language. The Sokoto Caliphate also established new trade routes and markets in the region, leading to economic changes.

==== Into the Oyo Empire ====
The Oyo Empire, located in present-day southwestern Nigeria, was one of the most powerful kingdoms in West Africa during the 18th century. However, by the early 19th century, the Oyo Empire was in decline due to internal conflicts, succession disputes, and pressures from external enemies. The Sokoto Caliphate, on the other hand, was on the rise. The Sokoto Caliphate's main involvement with the Oyo Empire was through Ilorin, a northern Yoruba vassal state of the Oyo Empire. The Ilorin, backed by the Sokoto Caliphate, launched a series of attacks against the Oyo Empire. These attacks, combined with internal conflicts, led to the final collapse of the Oyo Empire by the mid-19th century.

==== Into other parts of Hausaland ====
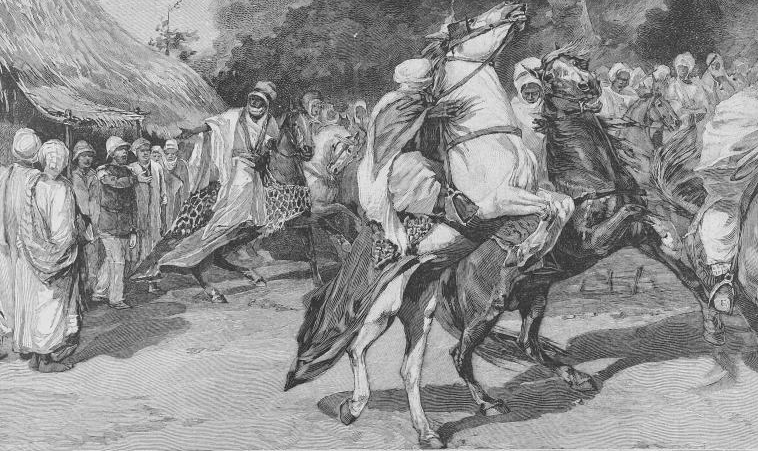
A brother of Sultan Abdur Rahman Atiku taking a leave from Antoine Mizon (1894)

Parts of present-day Niger, particularly the regions bordering Nigeria, were conquered by the Sokoto Caliphate. The town of Birnin Konni, for instance, was a significant center of the Caliphate in this region. The Sokoto Caliphate extended its influence into the northern areas of present-day Benin, which borders Nigeria to the west. The process of expansion into these regions was similar to that within Nigeria. The Caliphate launched military campaigns against local rulers, often exploiting internal conflicts and divisions. Upon conquering an area, the Caliphate would typically establish an emirate, appointing an emir to govern on behalf of the Sultan of Sokoto. The new rulers were expected to enforce Islamic law and pay tribute to the Sultan.

==== Into the Kanem-Bornu empire ====
The last major expansion of the Fulani jihadists was their part in the fall of the Sayfawa dynasty in 1846. The Sokoto Caliphate did not directly overthrow the dynasty that ruled the Bornu Empire, but the jihadist movements of the 19th century certainly had an impact on it. The empire was weakened by internal conflicts, as well as by external threats, including the expansion of the Sokoto Caliphate and the encroachment of other jihadist groups. The Fulani jihadists, under Usman dan Fodio's banner tried to conquer Borno, who was governed by Mai Dunama IX Lefiami, in 1808. They partly succeeded. They burnt the capital, Ngazargamu and defeated the main army of the Mai of Borno.

=== Influence on other Fula Jihad states ===
The 19th century was a period of significant Islamic reform and jihads in West Africa, and the Sokoto Caliphate was just one of several powerful states that emerged during this time. In present-day Mali, the Massina Empire and the Toucouleur Empire were examples of states established through similar processes of Islamic reform and military expansion. The Massina Empire, also known as the Diina of Hamdullahi, was an early 19th-century Fulani Jihad state centered in the Inner Niger Delta area of present-day Mali. This West African state was founded by Seku Amadu, also known as Sheikh Amadu Sheikh, who started a jihad movement among the Fulani people in the region. In the early 1800s, Seku Amadu, inspired by the teachings of Usman dan Fodio and the success of the Sokoto Caliphate, was authorized by Fodio to carry out jihad in the Massina region. Seku Amadu's forces succeeded in overthrowing the ruling elites and establishing a new jihadist state. The capital of the Massina Empire was Hamdullahi, a city founded by Seku Amadu. The expansion of the Massina Empire occurred mainly through military conquest. The Empire extended its control over the Inner Niger Delta and parts of the surrounding Sahelian and savannah regions. Some of the notable areas that came under the control of the Massina Empire include Timbuktu and Djenné, key centers of trans-Saharan slave trade. The Massina Empire's rule was characterized by a strict interpretation of Islamic law. Seku Amadu implemented legal and social reforms, including the outlawing of many traditional polytheist practices as well as forcing many polytheists into slavery. However, the Massina Empire also faced resistance. Some local communities resisted the imposition of Islamic law and the centralization of political power. Furthermore, the Massina Empire faced external threats from neighboring states, including the Toucouleur Empire under El Hadj Umar Tall. The Massina Empire fell to the Toucouleur Empire in 1862. Despite its relatively short lifespan, the Massina Empire had a significant impact on the region. It played a key role in spreading Islam.

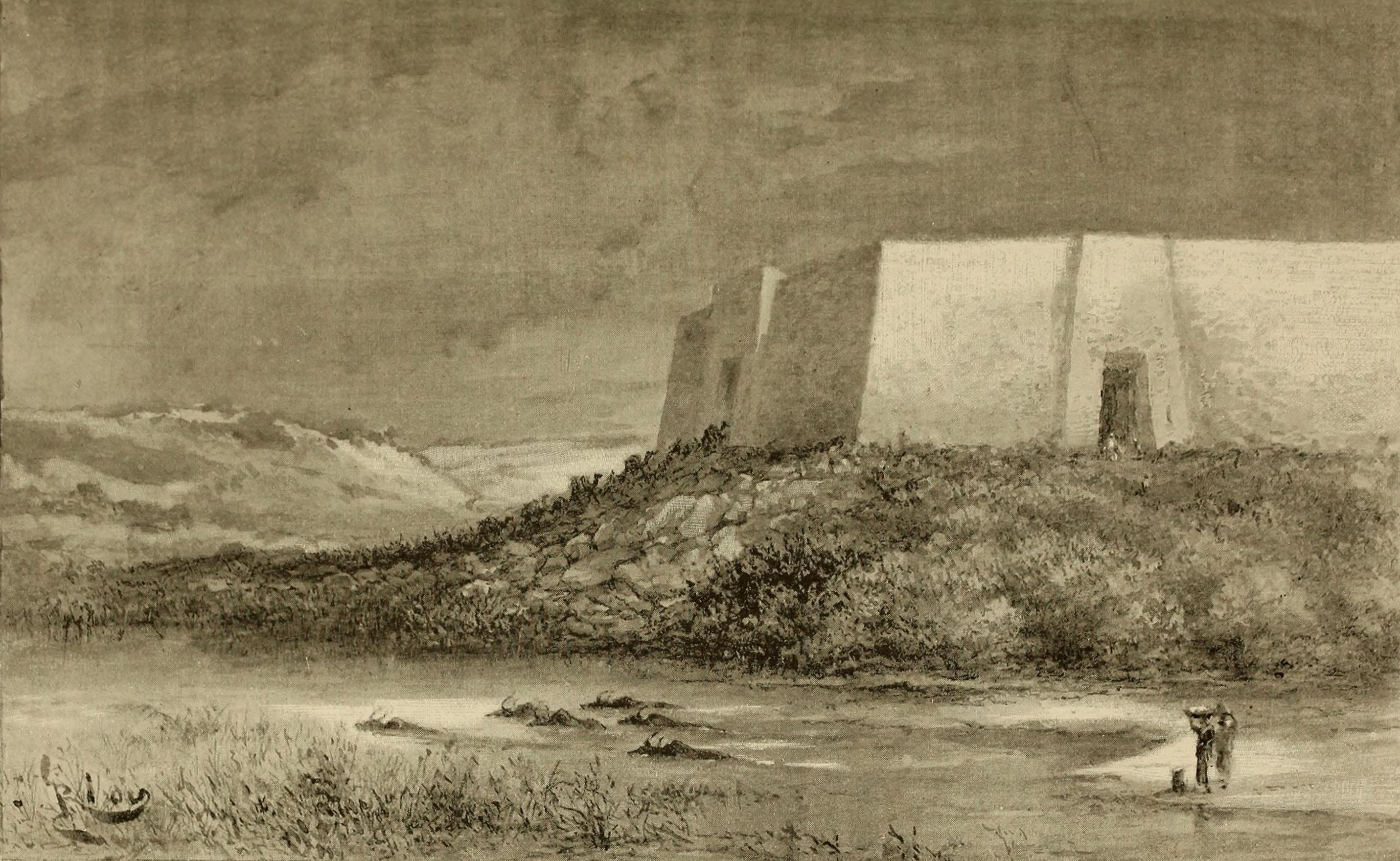
View of the outskirts of Sokoto (1890)

The Toucouleur Empire, also known as the Tukulor Empire, was a significant West African state that emerged during the 19th century, in what is now Mali, Senegal, and Guinea. It was founded by El Hadj Umar Tall, an Islamic leader of Tukulor descent, who sought to establish a jihadist state and conquer and enslave the polytheists in the region. Umar Tall began his jihad, or holy war, in the 1850s after studying in the Sokoto Caliphate. In 1854, Umar Tall declared a jihad against the un-Islamic practices of the local rulers. He assembled a large army, which included his fellow Toucouleurs, as well as other Muslim groups and enslaved individuals. With this army, he undertook a series of successful military campaigns against various West African kingdoms, including the Kingdom of Segou in 1861 and the Massina Empire in 1862. At its height, the Toucouleur Empire stretched from modern-day Senegal in the west to Timbuktu in the east. Its capital was established at Segou, in present-day Mali.

Though not strictly a jihadist state, the Wassoulou Empire, founded by Samori Ture, was a significant Islamic state during this period. Located in what is now Guinea, Sierra Leone, and Ivory Coast. The Wassoulou Empire was known for its strict implementation of Islam and enslavement of polytheists.

During and subsequent to the 18th century, the Wolof people were significantly affected by the tumultuous jihads spreading across West Africa. These militant Islamic campaigns faced heavy resistance from the Wolof kingdoms. However, in the 19th century, as the French colonial forces began taking territory in West Africa, the Wolof resisted French rule and increasingly turned towards Islam.

Despite their eventual dissolution, these jihadist states played a significant role in the spread of Islam and shaping of West Africa. They marked a crucial phase in the regional spread of Islam and a turbulent period in the region's indigenous political and social structures. Many of the jihadist movements began with the overthrow of traditional rulers who were accused of un-Islamic practices. These rulers were often replaced with leaders who had led the jihad and who sought to establish governance in diverse communities such as the Yoruba kingdoms, based on their new rules. The jihads often led to shifts in the social hierarchy.

=== Decline ===
European attention had been focusing on the region for colonial expansion for much of the last part of the 19th century. The French in particular had sent multiple exploratory missions to the area to assess colonial opportunities after 1870.

French explorer Parfait-Louis Monteil visited Sokoto in 1891 and noted that the Caliphate was at war with the Emir of Argungu, defeating Argungu the next year. Monteil claimed that Fulani power was tottering because of the war and the accession of the unpopular Caliph Abderrahman dan Abi Bakar.

However, following the Berlin Conference, the British had expanded into Southern Nigeria, and by 1901 had begun to move into the Sokoto Caliphate while simultaneous German efforts occurred in Cameroon. British General Frederick Lugard used rivalries between many of the emirs in the south and the central Sokoto administration to prevent any defense as he marched toward the capital, while the Germans conquered Adamawa. As the British approached the city of Sokoto, the new Sultan Muhammadu Attahiru I along with Muhammad bin Anabwani organized a quick defense of the city and fought the advancing British-led forces. The British force quickly won, sending Attahiru I and thousands of followers on a Mahdist hijra.

Muslim supporters and officials moved from Hausaland, Segu, Massina and Adamawa towards to Burmi, a military station on the far-eastern border of the Empire.

The now shattered Caliphate was partitioned by Britain and Germany. On 13 March 1903, at the grand market square of Sokoto, the last Vizier of the Caliphate officially conceded to British Rule. The British appointed Muhammadu Attahiru II as the new Caliph. Fredrick Lugard abolished the Caliphate, but retained the title Sultan as a symbolic position in the newly organized Northern Nigeria Protectorate. This remnant became known as "Sokoto Sultanate Council". In June 1903, the British defeated the remaining forces of Attahiru I in an engagement where he was killed in action; by 1906, armed resistance to British rule had ended.

== Administrative structure ==
The Sokoto state was largely organized around a number of largely independent emirates pledging allegiance to the sultan of Sokoto. The administration was initially built to follow those of Muhammad during his time in Medina, but also the theories of Al-Mawardi in "The Ordinances of Government". The Hausa kingdoms prior to Usman dan Fodio had been run largely through hereditary succession.

The early rulers of Sokoto, dan Fodio and Bello, abolished systems of hereditary succession, preferring leaders to be appointed by virtue of their Islamic scholarship and moral standing. Emirs were appointed by the sultan; they traveled yearly to pledge allegiance and deliver taxes in the form of crops, cowry shells, and slaves. When a sultan died or retired from the office, an appointment council made up of the emirs would select a replacement. Direct lines of succession were largely not followed, although each sultan claimed direct descent from dan Fodio.

The caliphate absorbed many of the structures of governments of their Hausa predecessors which they had conquered. It ruled under Islamic law with powers falling to the emirates which made up the caliphate. A large number of emirs and senior officials were Fulani clerics and scholars who participated in the Fulani War.

The major administrative division was between Sokoto and the Gwandu Emirate. In 1815, Usman dan Fodio retired from the administrative business of the state and divided the area taken over during the Fulani War with his brother Abdullahi dan Fodio ruling in the west with the Gwandu Emirate and his son Muhammed Bello taking over administration of the Sokoto Sultanate. The Emir at Gwandu retained allegiance to the Sokoto Sultanate and spiritual guidance from the sultan, but the emir managed the separate emirates under his supervision independently from the sultan.

Sokoto Caliphate, c. 1875

The administrative structure of loose allegiances of the emirates to the sultan did not always function smoothly. There was a series of revolutions by the Hausa aristocracy in 1816–1817 during the reign of Muhammed Bello, but the sultan ended these by granting the leaders titles to land. There were multiple crises that arose during the 19th century between the Sokoto Sultanate and many of the subservient emirates: notably, the Adamawa Emirate and the Kano Emirate. A serious revolt occurred in 1836 in the city-state of Gobir, which was crushed by Muhammed Bello at the Battle of Gawakuke.

The Sufi community throughout the region proved crucial in the administration of the state. The Tariqa brotherhoods, most notably the Qadiriyya, to which every successive sultan of Sokoto was an adherent, provided a group linking the distinct emirates to the authority of the sultan. Scholars Burnham and Last claim that this Islamic scholarship community provided an "embryonic bureaucracy" which linked the cities throughout the Sokoto state.

=== Viziers of Sokoto ===
The Caliphate and its resulting emirates each had Viziers (Waziris) as they are called in the Caliphate. Those Viziers mostly came from the most learned families in Sokoto, learned not only in the legal and political aspects of Islam but also in its mystical side. The classical vizierate is based on some verses from the Quran.

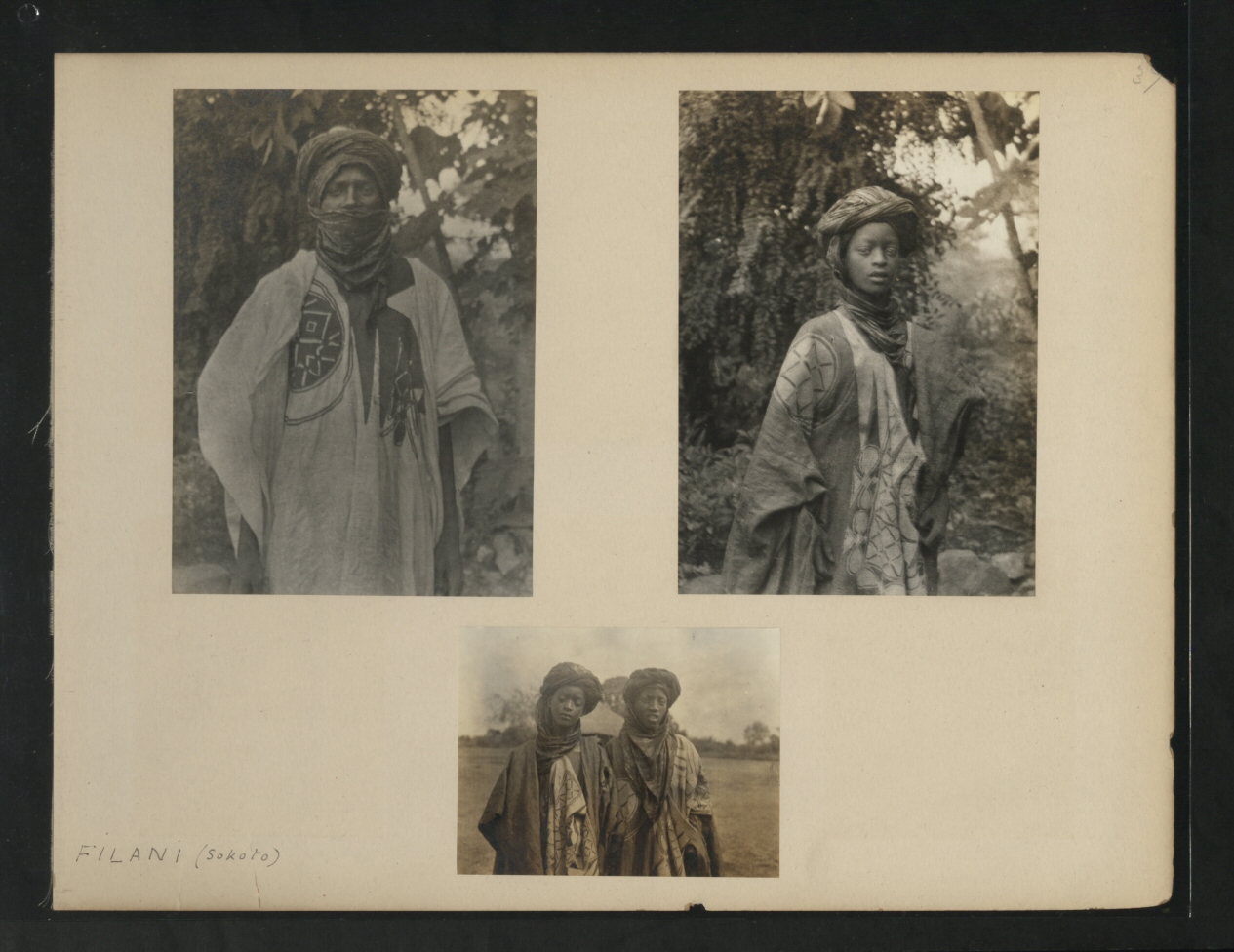
Fulani from Sokoto

يَفْقَهُوا۟ قَوْلِى
وَٱجْعَل لِّى وَزِيرًۭا مِّنْ أَهْلِى
هَـٰرُونَ أَخِى
ٱشْدُدْ بِهِۦٓ أَزْرِى
وَأَشْرِكْهُ فِىٓ أَمْرِى

— Quran 20:28–32
Translation:

so people may understand my speech,
and grant me a helper from my family,
Aaron, my brother.
Strengthen me through him,
and let him share my task

The vizierate in Sokoto was based on the Abbasid Caliphate version of the position. Shaikh Uthman dan Fodio's book, Bayan wujab al-hijra, justifies the existence of the position in the caliphate:

The first pillar [of a kingdom] is an upright wazir (vizier) over the wilaya who wakens [the king] if he sleeps and gives him sight if he cannot see and reminds him if he is heedless. The greatest catastrophe which could befall the wilaya and its subjects is to be deprived of good wazirs and helpers. One of the requirements of a wazir is that he should truly be benevolent and kind-hearted towards the people.

The first Grand Vizier of Sokoto was Abdullahi dan Fodio. He was described as a 'helper' to the Shaikh, the most important of his helpers. The 2nd Grand Vizier was Waziri Gidado bin Abu Bakr who was under Sultan Muhammad Bello. All subsequent 'Grand Vizier of Sokoto' came from his family, with his great-grandson, Gidado Idris, continuing the tradition of being the 'helper' to a Head of State by serving as Secretary to the Government of the Federation under the government of General Sani Abacha.

Waziri Gidado was married to the Shaikh's daughter Nana Asma'u dan Fodio. Abdullahi dan Fodio, the previous Grand Vizier, refused to relinquish the position even though Sultan Bello chose Gidado but he later formally recognised Gidado as the new vizier after his reconciliation with Muhammad Bello, giving Gidado his robes in token. As Vizier, Gidado had considerable freedom of judgement. He retired the Emir of Daura, Ishaq, and appointed his son, Zubair bin Ishaq which was later approved by Sultan Bello.

The position had a 'considerable following'. The Scottish explorer Hugh Clapperton in 1826 speaks of 'a numerous train of attendants on horseback and on foot'; another explorer Paul Staudinger in 1886 says the Vizier had considerable 'house-power' ('eine ziemliche Hausmacht'), having a hundred gunmen in his following. He had several estates and villages under him but their inhabitants are often scattered and distant from Sokoto only joining him for a major expedition.

Foreign visitors between 1880 and 1890 often saw the position as all-powerful. The Scottish geologist and explorer Joseph Thomson described him as being 'more powerful than the Sultan himself' since 'nothing is done except by his advice'; Staudinger reported that he was the most powerful of ministers, almost more so than the Sultan, since all government business went through him; William Wallace found that 'the grand Vizier practically rules the Fulah Empire' and holds 'all the real power, the Sultans being completely hedged in by formalities'. Though these impressions are exaggerated, the Vizier did appear to have the whole civil service under his control. The vizierate never rivalled the Caliph's position. The Vizier was the chief supporter, adviser and friend to the Caliph, and in that position was able to reassert the Islamic tradition in Sokoto.

=== Military ===
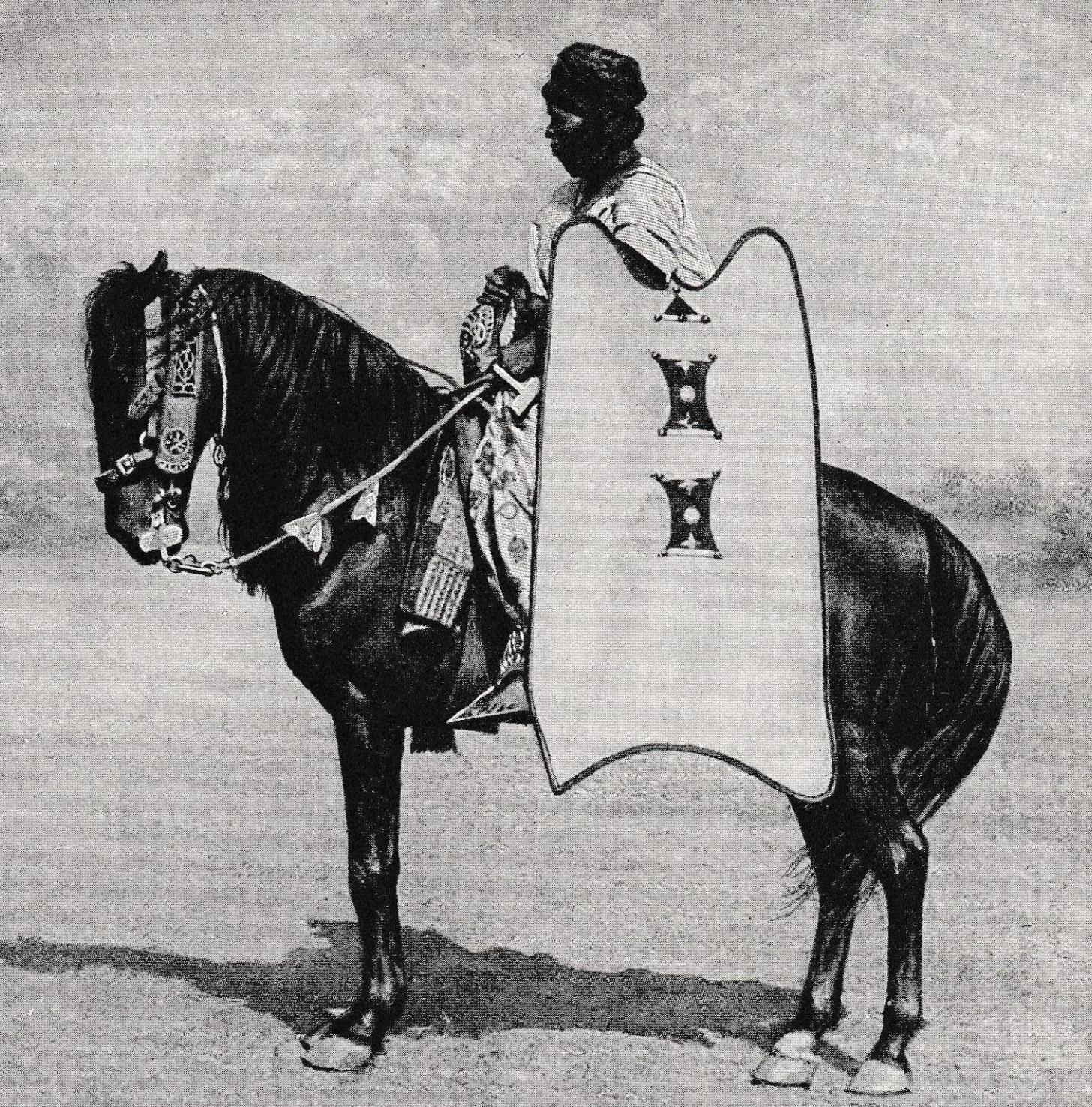
A Sokoto cavalryman carrying a large shield of oryx hide.

The military, which was commanded by the Sarkin Yaki (war commander) the title still held by the descendants of Ali Jedo, at the time of the jihad was organized into a standing army and a cavalry. The standing army was composed of Hausa and Fulani warriors who were trained in warfare and were responsible for the Caliphate's defense and the expansion of its territories. The cavalry was an essential part of the military, as horses were the primary mode of transportation during this period. During the expansion, the Caliphate's military utilized a strategy of establishing emirates in conquered territories. These emirates were governed by emirs, who were either appointed by the Sultan or were local rulers who had submitted to the Caliphate's authority. This strategy helped in maintaining control over the vast territories of the Caliphate.

The Sokoto Caliphate relied heavily on the use of cavalry in its military campaigns. The Fulani horsemen, renowned for their equestrian skills, formed the core of the Caliphate's cavalry. They were instrumental in the rapid expansion of the Caliphate's territories. Parfait-Louis Monteil, the french explorer who visited the caliphate in 1890, claimed that he witnessed Sultan Umaru bin Ali raise "an army of forty thousand men, half of whom were cavalry, to lay siege to Argungu."

Additionally, the Caliphate's military strategy involved a system of alliances with local rulers. In some cases, these rulers were allowed to maintain their positions under the condition that they pledged allegiance to the Caliphate and adopted Islam. This strategy helped to solidify the Caliphate's control over conquered territories. The military expansion of the Sokoto Caliphate had significant social, political, and economic impacts. It led to the spread of Islam and the Fulani language and culture in the region. The Caliphate's rule also resulted in changes in local governance systems and the economy, with the introduction of new administrative structures and trade networks.

Firearms introduced a major shift in the Sokoto Caliphate's military organization in the late 19th century. Initially, the Sokoto army relied on cavalry, close combat, and shock tactics, but after 1860, it transitioned to infantry, long-range fighting, and firepower. This shift hinted at a broader transformation from a "feudal" to a "bureaucratic" military system with standing armies. However, this evolution was halted by the British conquest (1897–1903), not internal resistance.

=== Scholarship ===
Islamic scholarship was a crucial aspect of the Caliphate from its founding. Sultan Usman dan Fodio, Sultan Muhammed Bello, Emir Abdullahi dan Fodio, Sultan Abu Bakr Atiku, and Nana Asma'u devoted significant time to chronicling histories, writing poetry, and Islamic studies. A number of manuscripts are available, and they provide crucial historical information and important spiritual texts. This role did diminish after the reign of Bello and Atiku.

Although veiling was practiced, it did not stop women from being educated in the caliphate. Many of the women around Shaikh Uthman dan Fodio, like his wives and daughters, were also his students and attained great learning. Slaves were encouraged to become Muslims and their children were given Muslim education and were taught Arabic. The Yan Taru movement started by Nana Asma'u dan Fodio in 1838 encouraged the education of women.

== Economy ==
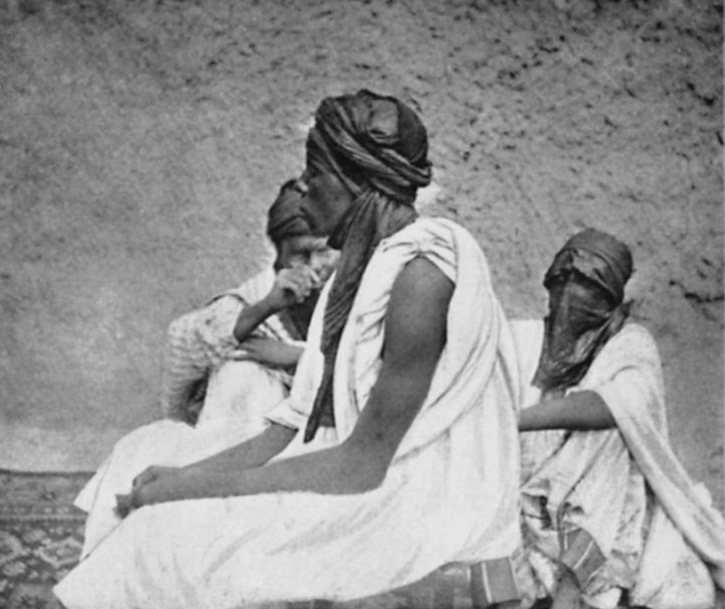
Photo of residents of Kano, Sokoto Caliphate in 1900

After the establishment of the Caliphate, there were decades of economic growth throughout the region, particularly after a wave of revolts in 1816–1817. They had significant trade over the trans-Saharan routes.

After the Fulani War, all land in the empire was declared waqf or owned by the entire community. However, the Sultan allocated land to individuals or families, as could an emir. Such land could be inherited by family members but could not be sold. Exchange was based largely on slaves, cowries or gold. Major crops produced included cotton, indigo, kola and shea nuts, grain, rice, tobacco, and onion.

Considerable numbers of scholars and the poor depended on the "great houses" for basic amenities like food and clothing. Food was prepared in the houses, which then acted like communal canteens. Clothing came largely from the payments from the other emirates in the caliphate and was redistributed to the community. This system helped Sokoto maintain a large scholar community.

Its commercial prosperity was also based on Islamic traditions, market integration, internal peace and an extensive export-trade network.

== Slavery ==
Slavery remained a large part of the economy, although its operation had changed with the end of the Atlantic slave trade. Slaves were gained through raiding and via markets as had operated earlier in West Africa. The founder of the Caliphate allowed slavery only for non-Muslims; slavery was viewed as a process to bring such peoples into the Muslim community. At least half of the Caliphate's population were enslaved people in the nineteenth century. There was a huge expansion of slaves due to the jihad campaigns, frontier wars and slave raids. The expansion of agricultural plantations under the Caliphate was dependent on slave labor. These plantations were established around the ribats, and large areas of agricultural production took place around the cities of the empire.

The institution of slavery was mediated by the lack of a racial barrier among the peoples, and by a complex and varying set of relations between owners and slaves, which included the right to accumulate property by working on their own plots, manumission, and the potential for slaves to convert and become members of the Islamic community. There are historical records of slaves reaching high levels of government and administration in the Sokoto Caliphate. On the other hand, these liniments to the slaving system were, like those in other slave societies, a buttress rather than a detriment although in some cases undoubtedly beneficial to individual slaves as Mohammed Bashir Salau writes: "Unfortunately for most slaves, however, masters often selected those they granted freedom in part because to maintain the plantation order, and in part to prevent the formation of a group consciousness among slaves ... Similarly, although the Islamic religion encouraged voluntary emancipation, and slave-owners were convinced that God would reward them when they freed slaves, most masters were very selective about whom they freed. They often gave first preference to slaves who exhibited "good behavior" and were "honest" and "hardworking"; also to those who were "too sick" and "too old" (to engage in rigorous plantation activities). This not only perpetuated the plantation's social order, but also reduced the slave-owner's expenditures; by freeing elderly and infirm slaves, the owner did not have to pay for their care."

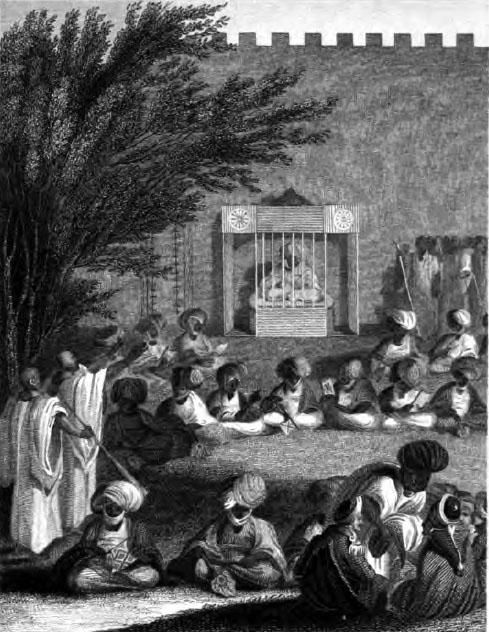
Reception of Dixon Denham and Hugh Clapperton by mai Ibrahim of Bornu, Muhammad al-Amin al-Kanemi in 1823

In 1829 Bain Hugh Clapperton wrote: "In this space is also the prison, a building of about eighty feet long, and nearly the same in breadth, covered at top with a flat clay roof, overlaid with boughs. Inside is a deep pit, where those who have committed the greatest crimes are confined. No person is put in prison for debt; only thieves, prisoners of war (taken singly), such as spies, and disobedient slaves, who, on a complaint to the sultan that they will not work, are sent to prison. Their only food is the bran or husks of millet and dourra, with water; but their friends are allowed to give them food, if they have any. It is a filthy place, and the terror of the men-slaves of Soccatoo. The prisoners are taken out, two and two, every day to work at the walls, or any laborious work which may occur." "In the Kano area, for instance, Gidan Ma'ajin Watari was the primary slave prison." If not desiring sale, the slave-owner would lay out the particular charge and "Thereafter, the erring slave was admitted into the facility through a succession of two doors, being severely beaten in the process."

Frederick John Dealtry Lugard, 1st Baron Lugard in a 1903 colonial account wrote thusly about conditions:

"I visited the dungeon myself. A small doorway 2 feet 6 inches by 1 foot 6 inches gives access into it. The interior is divided (by a thick mud wall with a similar hole through it) into two compartments, each 17 feet by 7 feet and 11 feet high. This wall was pierced with holes at its base through which the legs of those sentenced to death were thrust up to the thigh, and they were left to be trodden on by the mass of other prisoners till they died of thirst and starvation. The place is entirely air-tight and unventilated except for the one small doorway, or rather hole, in the wall through which you creep. The total space inside is 2,618 cubic feet, and at the time we took Kano 135 human beings were confined here each night, being let out during the day to cook their food, &c., in a small adjoining area. Recently as many as 200 have been interned at one time. As the superficial ground area was only 238 square feet there was not, of course, even standing room. Victims were crushed to death every night and their corpses were hauled out each morning. The stench, I am told, inside the place when Colonel Morland visited it was intolerable, though it was empty, and when I myself went inside three weeks later the effluvium was unbearable for more than a few seconds. A putrid corpse even then lay near the doorway."

Salau adds that "While in prison, a slave was usually subjected to torture by fellow inmates as well as by guards....Ultimately, it was the master who decided how many days the slave would spend in the facility."

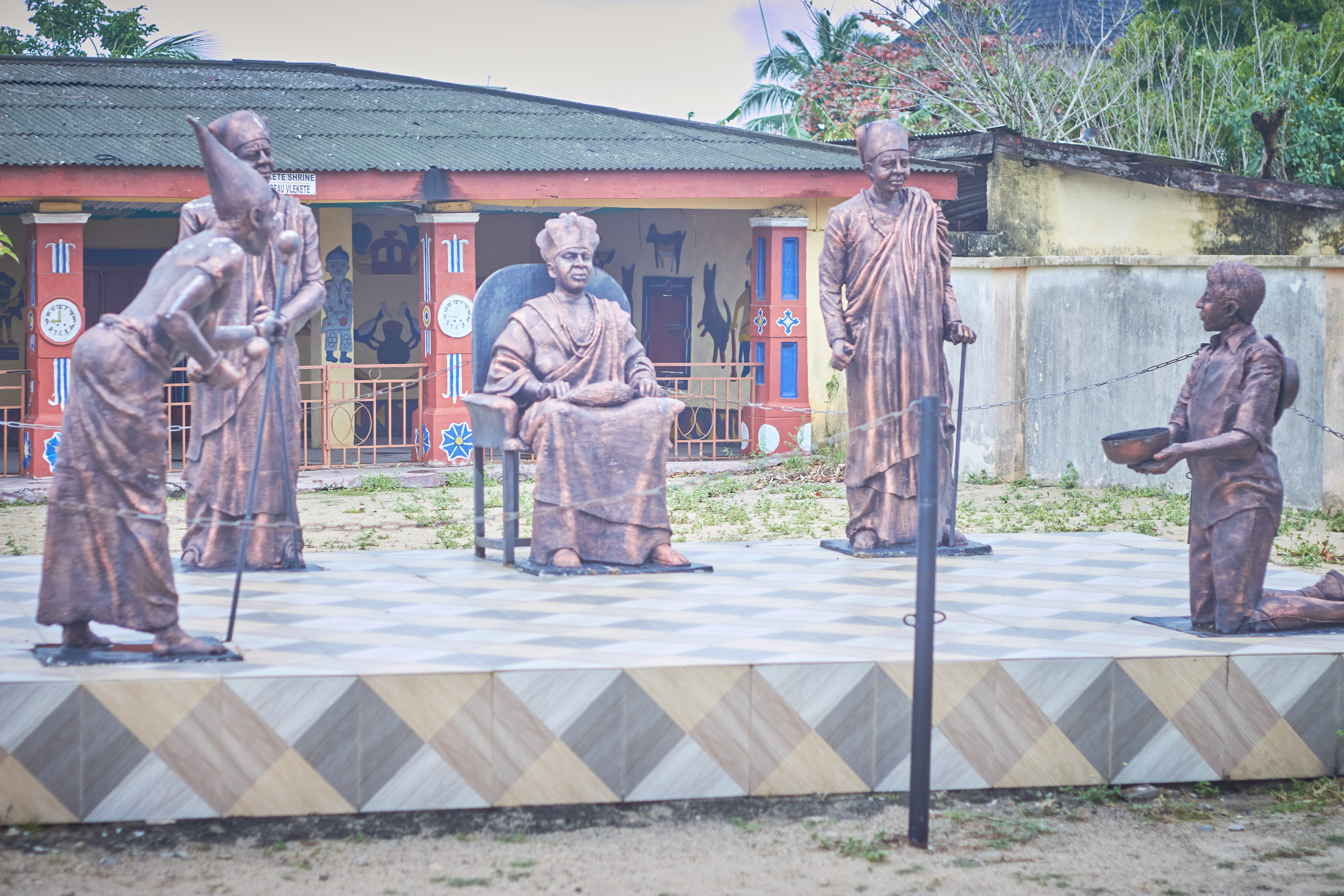
The Velekete slave market in Lagos State, Nigeria

In the early twentieth-century, the Protectorate of Northern Nigeria inherited one of the largest slave populations in the world, one to two and a half million slaves, a flourishing slave trade supplied by slave raids and thousands of slaves given as tributes to the Sultan of Sokoto and his emirs. The British High Commissioner Lugard abolished the legal status of slavery without compensation and officially declared all children born to slaves after 31 March 1901 as born free; however the slaves were given no assistance and cases of fugitive slaves were often handed over to indigenous Islamic sharia courts, which often restored them back to their Muslim owners.

By the 1920s big slave trade caravans had been eradicated by the colonial officials, but small scale slave trading was difficult to fully abolish. One example was the trade in girls from Adamawa, who were bought by merchants and kept for a year in Cameroon learning Hausa until they could be smuggled in to Nigeria to be sold in Kano for concubinage or domestic service. "Slave brokers, who themselves were formerly concubines, were procuring young girls for purposes of sale into slavery. Despite legal prohibitions which dated from the colonial era to the contrary, slave concubinage was a functioning institution in the northern states of Nigeria in 1988."

Even in the early twenty-first century the practice of wahaya (taking a "fifth wife") still existed in parts of Niger and the Sultanate of Sokoto:

"in the last quarter of 2008, prominent members of the Sultanate of Sokoto went to Zouraré, Tajaé, in search of young wahayu. Three female slaves were presented to them. They declined the offer of these three girls; they were not suitable. A two-month deadline was given to the suppliers to find 'suitable' girls from other nomadic groups. Girls had to be found, because it would be dishonourable for the Touareg elites and their groups to say that they do not have slaves available".

— Anti-Slavery International, citing Chaibou Sarkin Bouzayé of Wournoc

== Culture ==
The Fulani ruling class engaged in marriage alliances with Hausa families. The Hausa language became the language of administration and main medium of poetry in the caliphate.

== Legacy ==
Although it has lost its former political power, the Sokoto Sultanate Council continues to exist, and the Sokoto Sultans are still "leading figures in Nigerian society". Even the Presidents of Nigeria have sought their support.

Due to its impact, the Sokoto Caliphate is also revered by Islamists in modern Nigeria. For example, the Jihadist militant group Ansaru has vowed to revive the Sokoto Caliphate in order to restore the "lost dignity of Muslims in black Africa".

The influence of the Sokoto Caliphate can also be seen in extremist groups like Boko Haram. Boko Haram, based in northeastern Nigeria, promotes an extremist interpretation of Islam and seeks to establish an Islamic state governed by strict Sharia law. While they have occasionally referenced Usman dan Fodio's legacy to justify their actions, presenting their struggle as a continuation of the original jihad, there are fundamental differences between the two jihadist movements. The Sokoto Jihad's intellectual thought, according to historian Michael Cook, can be described as part of the sixteenth to eighteenth centuries Islamic world's "conservative orientation towards intellectual innovation". The three leaders of the jihad, namely Usman, Abdullahi and Bello, drew heavily from Maliki and Qadriyya texts, with connections to wider Islamic intellectual networks. In contrast, Boko Haram operates in a globalized world and draws influences from Salafi and Wahhabi ideology and is connected and influenced by global Salafi jihadist networks.

Boko Haram operates primarily in Borno State, and the historical context of the state, which is the central fragment of the old Kanem-Bornu empire of the Kanuri people, has effects today. Bornu, led by Shaikh al-Kanemi, had a history of resistance against the Sokoto jihad and actively opposed the encroachment and ideology of the caliphate. There were intense debates and correspondence between Bello and al-Kanemi during the jihad, reflecting their differing perspectives. While the Sokoto Caliphate had limited success in fully subjugating Bornu, Boko Haram, founded by Muhammad Yusuf and later led by Shekau, emerged from the Kanuri community. Their ideology criticized the established Islamic tradition of the Sokoto Caliphate, considering it impure and in need of reform. They sought to return to what they perceived as more orthodox practices based on Salafi thought, rejecting the Maliki law and Sufi influences of the Sokoto Caliphate. Influential Salafi scholars in Nigeria critique Boko Haram, highlighting their leaders' lack of proper education in fiqh (Islamic jurisprudence) and their misinterpretation and misuse of Salafi texts. This is in contrast to the Sokoto jihad leaders who were renowned Maliki scholars, with Usman and Abdullahi already being respected scholars prior to the jihad.
