= Charles Dwight Marsh =

American botanist (1855–1932)

Charles Dwight Marsh (December 20, 1855 – April 23, 1932) was an American botanist.

Marsh graduated with A.B. from Amherst College in 1877 and with Ph.D. in Zoology and Botany from the University of Chicago in 1904. Employed by the Bureau of Plant Industry, U.S. Department of Agriculture, he was in charge of field experiments on locoweed. In 1912 from January 15 to February 16 he did field research for the Biological Survey of the Panama Canal Zone, where he collected samples of the plankton in fresh waters.

== Selected publications ==
- The plankton of Lake Winnebago and Green Lake (1904)
- The loco-weed disease of the plains (1909)
- Stock-poisoning plants of the range (1924)
