= Mbormi Battle Ground =

Nigerian Historical Site

Mbormi Battle Ground is an historical site near Nafada in Gombe State, Nigeria. It is the site of a 1903 battle in which Muhammadu Attahiru I, the Sultan of the Sokoto Caliphate, was killed alongside many of his people. The site embodies the fight and resistance against colonial rule. Three tombs lie on the battle ground, and the site attracts many visitors.

== History ==
Muhammadu Attahiru I, the 12th Sultan of the Sokoto Caliphate, fled from the invasion of British forces who sought to conquer the caliphate and put it under the control of the colonial government. The Sultan was fleeing to Medina as instructed by his grandfather Usman Danfodio for fear of an invasion. While on his way to Medina, he stopped at Mbormi for some days, and in this period, a British attack on July 27, 1903, led to the battle and killings. The Sultan's death marked the end of the Sokoto Caliphate and the creation of the Sokoto Sultanate, which was then controlled by the colonial government.

Many descendants of both Sultan Attahiru and the leader of the colonialists refuse to exchange pleasantries when they visit the tombs of their ancestors. The site comprises the three tombs and a large area of farmland.

== Mbormi village ==
Mbormi village is four kilometres from Bajoga, the headquarters of Funakaye local area, which is about 76 km from the state capital Gombe. The village was founded by Jibril Gaini, a militant Mahdist, after he was expelled from the Katagum emirate in Bauchi state. The fourth emir gave him a farm known as "Mbormi".

The village is deserted because the government has not allowed people to settle. The Sultan's tombs are close to the central mosque. The chief imam's tomb is about 50 meters from the Sultan's tomb. Major Mash, the commander of the British forces, was buried where he was killed, about 150 meters from the Sultan's tomb. The remains of the other dead were piled up to form a pyramid beneath a tree near the mosque.

Mbormi Battle Ground is one of five Nigerian sites that have been proposed for the World Islamic Heritage list.
