= Muhammadu Attahiru I =

- Sultan of Sokoto
- Reign: October 13, 1902 – March 15, 1903
- Predecessor: Abderrahman dan Abi Bakar
- Successor: Muhammadu Attahiru II
- Born: Sokoto
- Died: August 1903; Burmi, 5km East of Bajoga in Funakaye local government area in present gombe state Nigeria.
- House: Atiku Clan
- Father: Ahmadu Atiku

Muhammadu Attahiru I (died 1903) was the twelfth Sultan of the Sokoto Caliphate from October 1902 until March 15, 1903. He was the last independent Sultan of Sokoto before the Caliphate was taken over by the British.

== Reign as Sultan ==
Attahiru came to the throne upon the death of Abderrahman dan Abi Bakar in October 1902 while the British forces had already taken over parts of the Sokoto Caliphate. During the last year of Abderrahman's reign, British General Frederick Lugard had been able to use rivalries between the emirs in the south with the Sokoto Caliphate to prevent a coherent defense against British troops. A British led force was quickly approaching the city of Sokoto with clear intentions to take it over. Attahiru I organized a quick defense of the city and decided to fight the advancing British army outside of the city of Sokoto. This battle ended quickly in favor of the British with superior firepower causing high casualties on the side of Attahiru I.

== Resistance to British rule ==
Attahiru I and many followers fled the city of Sokoto on what Attahiru I described as a hijra to prepare for the coming of the Mahdi. The British moved into the largely depopulated Sokoto and appointed Muhammadu Attahiru II the new Caliph on March 21, 1903. Lugard essentially abolished the Caliph and retained the title Sultan as a symbolic position in the newly organized Northern Nigeria Protectorate.

Attahiru I began traveling through the rural regions of the Sokoto Caliphate to gather supporters for his movement, pursued by the British. The British and emirs working with the British were shocked at the large number of people who joined Attahiru and his force grew to thousands. Marching through Zamfara and Kano, the British became increasingly concerned with the force. The British attacked the rebels in the Mbormi Battle Ground (near present-day Gombe) on July 29, and Attahiru I was amongst those killed. The British then proceeded to decapitate Attahiru, took photographs of the beheaded sultan, and then displayed the photographs throughout Northern Nigeria to "convince the diehards of the futility of fighting". His son, Muhammad Bello bin Attahiru or Mai Wurno continued to lead the remaining members of the movement and eventually settled in Sudan, where many of the descendants still live today.

== See also ==
- Tomb of Muhammadu Attahiru I

Preceded by Abderrahman dan Abi Bakar	12th Sokoto Caliph; 1902–1903	Succeeded by Muhammadu Attahiru II
