= Bida (disambiguation) =

Bida is a city in Nigeria.

Bida may also refer to:

== Places ==
- Bida, part of Eraguene, Algeria
- Bida (North Africa), an ancient city, former bishopric and Latin Catholic titular see
- Bida Emirate, traditional state in Nigeria
- Bida Setar, village in Iran

== People ==
- Bida (footballer) (born 1984), Brazilian footballer
- Alexandre Bida (1813–1895), French painter
- Aliyu Makama Bida (1905–1980), Nigerian politician
- Bartosz Bida (born 2001), Polish footballer
- Sergey Bida (born 1993), Russian Olympic medalist épée fencer
- Violetta Khrapina Bida (born 1994), Olympic épée fencer

== Other ==
- Bida Airstrip in Nigeria
- Bida (moth), a moth genus in the family Xyloryctidae
- Bid‘ah, the Islamic concept of innovation
- Federal Medical Centre (Bida) in Nigeria
- Federal Polytechnic Bida, school in Nigeria
- Bangladesh Investment Development Authority (BIDA)

== See also ==
- Baeda Maryam (disambiguation), Emperors of Ethiopia
