= Musa Bello =

11th Etsu Nupe

- Etsu Nupe
- Reign: 1967–1975
- Coronation: 1967
- Predecessor: Usman Sarki
- Successor: Umaru Sanda Ndayako
- Born: 1919; Bida
- Died: 1975 (aged 55–56)
- House: Usman Zaki rulings dynasty
- Father: Etsu Bello Maliki
- Religion: Sunni Islam

Musa Bello (1919–1975) was the 11th Etsu Nupe in Nupe kingdom reigns from 1967 to his death in 1975 and was succeeded by the 12th Etsu Nupe Umaru Sanda Ndayako.

== Background ==
his father was the seventh Etsu Nupe Bello Maliki. He had his entire education in Bida Emirate and later he became the head district of Badeggi in 1965 and Katcha before then he worked at Kaduna contractor company.

== Ruling house ==
He belong to the second house of rulings house, house Masaba in Nupe Kingdom and Bida Emirates. He is a grandfather to the present 13th Etsu Nupe Yahaya Abubakar, and uncle to the 12th Etsu Nupe Umaru Sanda Ndayako both came in a different rulings house but the same great grandfather Mallam Dendo.
