= Saidu Musa Abdullahi =

Nigeria Politician

Honourable Saidu Musa Abdullahi

Member Federal House of Representative from Niger State
- Incumbent
- Assumed office June 2019
- Preceded by: Hon. Bala Faruk Muhammadu
- Constituency: Bida; Gbako; Katcha

Personal details
- Born: Saidu Musa Abdullahi; 31 May 1979 (age 47) Bida, Niger State
- Party: All Progressive Congress (APC)
- Education: Ahmadu Bello University; Bayero University; The Federal Polytechnic Bida

Saidu Musa Abdullahi mostly known as SMA (born 31 May 1979) is a Member of the Federal House of Representative, representing Bida/Katcha/Gbako federal constituency assumed office in June 2019.

He is the deputy chairman, House of Representatives' Committee on Finance; Secretary, Niger State Caucus of Ninth National Assembly; Member of House of Representatives' Committees on Public Petitions; Banking & Currency; Insurance & Acturial Matters; Federal Capital Territory; Agricultural Colleges & Institutions; and Interpaliamentary Affairs. Within few months of assumption of office as a lawmaker, Etsu Nupe and Chairman Niger State Council of Traditional Rulers, Alhaji Yahaya Abubakar(CFR) conferred on him the traditional title of Dan-Barije Nupe which was a few hours later elevated to Gorozon (Mesiah) of Nupe Kingdom.

== Education and career ==
He is a graduate of Economics of Ahmadu Bello University, (ABU) Zaria with a second class and had his master's degree in Development Studies from Bayero University, Kano with ten years of professional work experience, under three sectors which include Banking, and Oil/Gas. He started with the Zenith Bank Plc in 2000 and then Oando Plc being the sales manager in Adamawa, Jalingo, Benue, Kano, Jigawa. He is the COO of Gerawa Global Engineering Limited. Also in 2005, he was the spokesman in the Solitaire Economics Class at the Ahmadu Bello University, Zaria, which took place in Abuja. He is the present Deputy Chairman of the House Committee on Finance.

He is the son of Musa Abdullahi a retired chief judge in Niger State High Court. He joined politics in 2019 under the platform of All Progressives Congress as a candidate of Bida/Gbako/Katcha Federal constituency in Niger State, in a statements by him that if the ticket of Gubernatorial election was not given to the present Governor as well as Muhammadu Buhari that it would be a diversion to him.

== Students Educational Pro-support ==
Saidu helps to support 100 students from his constituency for educational purposes in institutions such as Ibrahim Babangida University, Lapai Nigeria Army University Biu, Federal University of Technology Minna, Ahmadu Bello University Zaria and also made the arrangements of 2020, 2021 and 2022 Unified Tertiary Matriculation Examination registering 2,500 candidates so far.
