= Abubakar Dzukogi =

Nigerian educator

Abubakar Abdul Dzukogi

Rector of the Federal Polytechnic Bida
- Incumbent
- Assumed office 2015
- Preceded by: Dr. Abdullahi Sule

Personal details
- Born: 1956 (age 70) Bida, Nigeria
- Occupation: Educator, author
- Website: www.abubakarabduldzukogi.com.ng

Abubakar Abdul Dzukogi (born 1956) is a Nigerian educator. He serves as the rector of Federal Polytechnic Bida by Muhammadu Buhari. He was the rector from 2015 to 2019. He assumed office in May 2019.

As the 11th rector, he created a special fund to assist students on their school registration dues, mainly indigenous students.

== Controversy ==
FPB's governing body requested that Dzukogi be fired. The campaign was led by chair Saganuwon in the Etsu Nupe Abubakar Yahaya palace in Bida. Speaking with Etsu Nupe protesters hoisted banners saying Dzukogi must go, we will not be intimidated, we say no to forced sack, They insisted that process must be followed. Insisting the rector should be sacked, this chaos came across for the dissolution of the sixteen weeks ASUP body and strike that was later resolved by the secretary of National Board for Technical Education (NBTE).
