= Gogo Habiba =

19th-century Nigerian slave trader and aristocrat

- Sagi of Nupe
- Born: 1805; Rabba, Kingdom of Nupe (in modern-day Niger State)
- Died: 1867 (aged 61–62); Bida, Bida Emirate
- Father: Mallam Dendo
- Occupation: Slave merchant
- Cause of death: Suicide

Gogo Habiba, also known as Habiba Sabaci (1805–1867), was a Fulani noblewoman and slave merchant who wielded significant political influence in Nupeland during the mid-19th century. She was the daughter of Mallam Dendo, the founder of the Nupe-Fulani dynasty that had ruled Nupeland since the early 19th century.

Habiba reached the height of her power during the second reign of her younger brother, Emir Masaba (r. 1859–1873). During this period, she was granted the royal title of Sagi, which put her in charge of the affairs of women in the Emirate. She was answerable only to the Emir. Habiba was also said to have commanded an army comparable to that of Masaba's in Bida. Operating from her slave depot at Badegi-Lapai (now called Badeggi, located in Katcha), her men regularly conducted slave raids in neighbouring, weaker Nupe and Gbagyi settlements. She traded the captured slaves as far as Lagos, notably with Madame Tinubu, another influential female slave trader.

Fearing Habiba's growing influence and popularity, Emir Masaba convinced his sister to move to Bida, the capital of his Emirate. However, in Bida, her influence continued to grow, once again overshadowing her half-brother. The arrival of British merchants in the early 1860s presented Masaba with another opportunity to curtail his sister's power over the Emirate. Throughout the decade, he cultivated a strong friendship with these merchants, who supplied him with modern weaponry and a steady flow of firearms. As Masaba's wealth and power rapidly increased, his relationship with Habiba deteriorated. This led Habiba to plot a rebellion against him. She, along with some members of the ruling family, allied with Etsu Baba of the old Nupe ruling dynasty to eliminate Masaba. However, before they could act, the plot was discovered, and Habiba was forced to commit suicide.

== Early life ==
Gogo Habiba was born in the early 19th century in Rabba, at the time the capital city of the Nupe Kingdom. Her father was Mallam Dendo, an itinerant Fulani preacher. In the late 18th century, during the second reign of Etsu Ma'azu (r. 1778–1795), Dendo first appeared in Nupeland as a diviner and seller of charms. He quickly gained a considerable following in the region, particularly among the Fulani. In 1796, the kingdom was plunged into a dynastic feud between two rival claimants, which split the kingdom into two: Jimada, who ruled the eastern half from Gbara, and Majiya, who controlled the western half from Rabba. With the support of Dendo and his followers, Majiya was able to defeat Jimada and reunite the kingdom. Among the several gifts Majiya gave Dendo for his support were two slave girls. Dendo took one as a concubine and gifted the other to the Caliph of Sokoto. It was this slave concubine who gave birth to Gogo Habiba.

Despite her mother's status as a slave, Habiba was raised as a legitimate child of Dendo. Of her eight siblings, only two survived into the latter half of the 19th century, both of whom were her half-brothers: Usman Zaki, the first Emir of Bida (r. 1857–1859), and Muhammad Saba, also known as Masaba, who succeeded as the second Emir of Bida (r. 1859–1873). Habiba grew to be fond of her younger brother Masaba, who was born to a Nupe princess shortly after her birth. Their close relationship was due to the friendship both their mothers shared.

== Succession crisis ==
By the time of Mallam Dendo's death in 1832, he had amassed significant power in the Nupe Kingdom, effectively controlling the region while the Etsus of Nupe served as puppet rulers. His second eldest surviving son, Usman Zaki, succeeded him. Not long after his appointment, Usman faced a rebellion from his half-brother Masaba, who believed he was more entitled to the position due to his Nupe lineage. After being expelled from Rabba in 1833, Masaba allied with the shadow Nupe princes, Idrisu and Tsado, in an effort to overthrow Usman. After their rebellion failed, Usman adopted the title of Etsu Nupe and established an emirate, pledging his loyalty to the Sokoto Caliphate. Later, Tsado led another revolt against Usman, and once again, Masaba joined forces with him. This time, they successfully captured Rabba and forced Usman to flee the capital. In response to the crisis, the Emir of Gwandu, Ibrahim Halilu, who had authority over Nupeland, traveled to Rabba in 1841. After consulting with the kingdom's leaders, including Usman, Masaba, and Tsado, he appointed Masaba as the Emir of Nupe.

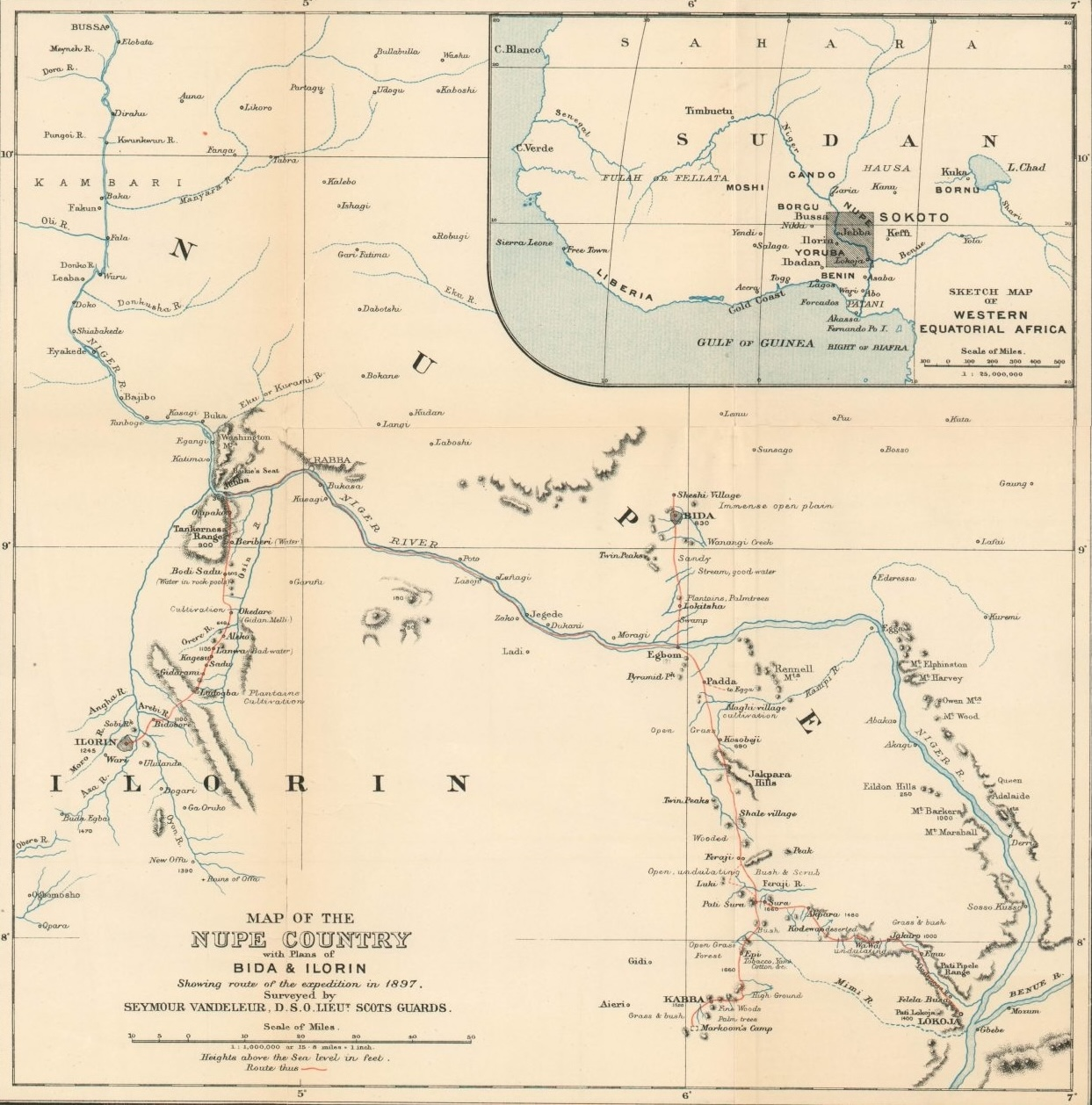
An 1897 map of the emirates of Nupe and Ilorin

During these turbulent times, Habiba remained in Rabba, managing the slave trading business she had established before her father's death in 1832. In the early 1850s, however, one of Masaba's generals, Umar Bahaushe, turned against him and rebelled. Although Masaba was defeated, he managed to escape to Ilorin. Habiba, now the only remaining member of the Dendo family in Rabba, recognised the threat to her family's power and property. She quickly sent messengers to Gwandu, where her brother Usman Zaki and cousin Umaru Majigi were in exile. She also ensured the safe passage of Masaba's wives and children to Ilorin. With the support of the Gwandu Emirate, the Dendo family defeated General Bahaushe in 1856. Usman Zaki was then installed as the Emir of Nupe, a position he held until his death in 1859. He was succeeded by Masaba, who ruled until 1873.

== Rise of influence ==
Soon after the return of the Dendo family, the Emirate underwent significant reforms, including relocating the capital to Bida. Among the changes introduced was the reintroduction of an ancient Nupe royal title, the Sagi, which was conferred upon Habiba. As Sagi, Habiba was responsible for overseeing the affairs of women in the Emirate and served as an active member of the Emir's council, answerable only to him. This office granted her considerable power over the women of the Emirate. British anthropologist S F Nadel explains that the Sagi and her deputy, Nimwoye, were considered 'kings over the women of Nupe'. Habiba also commanded a hierarchy of officials similar to that of the Emir, including a war commander, and had a large following of slaves and adventurers.

Habiba's slave trading business expanded further during Masaba's reign. She extended her interests into Gbagyiland, ordering and sometimes leading slave raids into settlements. By 1860, she moved out of Bida and settled at a slave depot she had established in Badegi-Lapai (now called Badeggi, located in Katcha). During Masaba's reign, this slave depot grew into a district with over 60 slave villages ('tungazi'). Because she was fond of giving lavish gifts to her followers and soldiers, her following continued to grow. Eventually, she built a standing army comparable to that of the Emir. At Badegi-Lapai, she traded in slaves as far as Lagos, particularly with another influential female slave merchant, Madam Tinubu. Her vast economic resources earned her the loyalty of the Emirate's nobility, which made her very influential politically. It was said that Emir Masaba could not make any major decisions without her approval. Additionally, those seeking favors from Masaba often went through her.

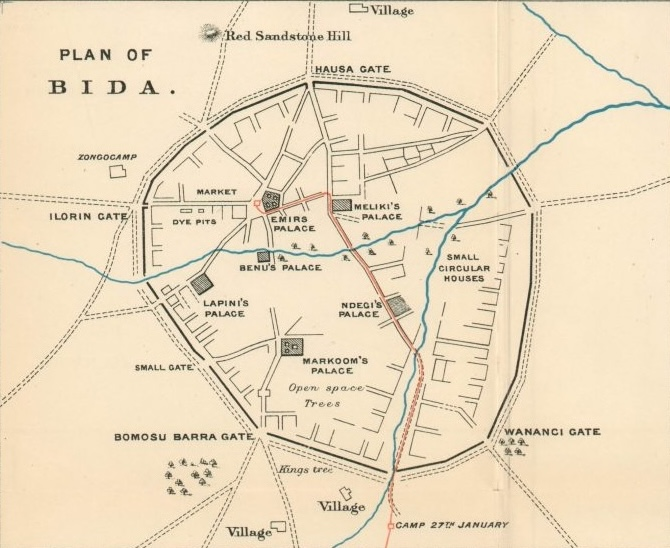
An 1897 plan of Bida city

Habiba's considerable influence over Masaba angered his other counselors. They met with Masaba and argued that his sister's influence might one day overshadow his own if not curtailed. They also warned that her rising popularity could lead to a mass exodus of people from Bida to stay with her at Badegi-Lapai. As a result, Masaba spent seven months trying to convince his sister to move back to Bida. After initially refusing his requests, she eventually established a new settlement about 15 km from Bida, which she named Badegi-Alugi. However, this did not seem to ease Masaba's anxiety, as he visited her several times at her new base, pleading with her to return to Bida. She finally agreed to his requests on the condition that a large palace be built for her. She rejected the first three presented to her, deeming them too small to accommodate her and her personal attendants. Masaba was eventually forced to commission a palace comparable to his own for Habiba. She finally accepted this new compound, located in the Bantigi quarters of Bida, and also took possession of the other three buildings she had earlier rejected. The ruins of these houses are still visible today. Habiba was said to have returned to Bida with around six thousand followers, along with thousands of slaves and cattle. She came to control much of the activities in Bantigi and even established an administrative structure headed by a Ndeji ('prime minister'), whom she took as her only spouse.

== Arrival of British merchants and death ==
In Bida, Habiba's popularity continued to grow, further frustrating Emir Masaba. The people saw her as a benevolent and courageous leader who led her soldiers into battle, in contrast to her ruthless and high-handed half-brother. When British merchants arrived in the early 1860s, Masaba was presented with another opportunity to curtail his sister's influence over the Emirate. Throughout the 1860s, he had cultivated a strong friendship with these merchants, even permitting them to establish the city of Lokoja, a trading settlement at the confluence of the Niger and Benue rivers. In return, the merchants supplied Masaba with modern weaponry and a steady flow of firearms.

As Masaba's wealth and power grew rapidly, his relationship with Habiba deteriorated. He ignored her frequent complaints and concerns about the recent developments. This led Habiba to plot a rebellion against him. In 1867, she, along with some members of the ruling family, allied with Etsu Baba of the old Nupe ruling dynasty to eliminate Masaba. However, before they could act, the plot was discovered, and Habiba was forced to commit suicide.

== See also ==
- Efunsetan Aniwura
- Efunroye Tinubu
