= Muhammadu Ndayako =

9th Estu Nupe (9th Emir of Bida)

- 9th Estu Nupe (9th emir of bida)
- Reign: 1935-1962
- Predecessor: Saidu Mamuda
- Successor: Usman Sarki
- Born: Muhammadu; 1884
- Died: 1962 (aged 77–78); Nigeria
- Spouse: Aisha Nuendo
- Issue: Umaru Sanda Ndayako 12th Etsu Nupe
- House: Ndayako
- Religion: Islam

Muhammadu Ndayako CMG CBE (1884–1962), popularly known as Baba Kudu, is the 9th Etsu Nupe, from 1935 till his death in 1962.

== Background ==
He was born into 3rd Bida ruling house of Umaru Majigi. He is the son of the 6th Etsu Nupe Malam Muhammad Makun who was the son of the 3rd Etsu Nupe, Umaru Majigi. Muhammadu Ndayako is a grand uncle to the 13th Etsu Nupe Yahaya Abubakar.

Etsu Ndayako reigned for 26 years (1935–1962), also as his son the 12th Etsu Nupe Umaru Sanda Ndayako ruled for 28 years, being longest server of the throne.

== Notes ==
Preceded by Saidu Mamuda	Etsu Nupe	Succeeded by Usman Sarki
