= Umaru Sanda Ndayako =

12th Etsu Nupe (Emir of Bida); Nigeria

- 12th Etsu Nupe Emir of Bida
- Reign: February 1975 – 8 September 2003
- Coronation: February 1975
- Predecessor: Musa Bello
- Successor: Yahaya Abubakar
- Born: Umaru Sanda; 1937; Bida Emirate, Nigeria
- Died: 2003 (aged 65–66)
- Burial: Bida Native ground
- Spouse: Hajiya Sanda
Names
- Umaru Sanda Muhammadu Ndayako
Era name and dates
- Sanda Ndayako: 1974–2003
Posthumous name
- Muhammadu Ndayako Sanda
Temple name
- Etsu Sanda
- House Masaba (three rulings arms): Umaru Majigi/Masaba/Usman zaki: Etsu Palace
- Father: Muhammadu Ndayako
- Mother: Aisha Nuendo
- Religion: Sunni Islam
- Occupation: Civil servant, traditional ruler

Alhaji (Dr) Umaru Sanda Ndayako (CFR, OFR), (1937 – 8 September, 2003) was the 12th Etsu Nupe from one of the ruling houses of Bida. His parents were Muhammadu Ndayako (CBE), the late 9th Etsu Nupe and Aisha Nuadoro.

== Background education ==
Ndayako started elementary school at Elementary School Bida in 1945 and went to Ilorin for middle school in 1949, finishing in 1951. He obtained his high school certificate at the prestigious Government College Zaria (now Barewa College Zaria) where he graduated in 1956, and then he attended Nigeria College of Art Science and Technology Zaria in 1957. He later proceeded to University College Ibadan (now University of Ibadan) and obtained a Bachelor's Degree in 1962.

== Career ==
Ndayako started his government Careers in early 60's as an Assistant Secretary in Ministry of Local government Kaduna State also being the Assistant District Officer in charge of the Tiv Divisions and letter he was transfer to Kano State there he served as District Officer for Urban in 1965 he was Principal Secretary Ministry of Housing Lagos and was also Deputy Permanent Secretary of Political Division, in 1968 he was appointed Chancellor University of Ile-Ife (now Obafemi Awolowo University) Ile Ife, he once serve as member National Universities Commission and chairman Ahmadu Bello University council, and member National Council of States. He became the Etsu nupe in 1975 till his death in 2003, there he serve for 28 years being the longest holder of the title Etsu nupe, he was given national honour Commander of the order of the Federal Republic, CFR in 1982. He was also head of Technical Committee, set up by Olusegun Obasanjo in 2003, leading eleven men's to reform the local government administration commitment and effectiveness. The committee was established in 1976 by Obasanjo Military Administration in Nigeria.

== Ruling house ==
Etsu Ndayako was of one ruling house of Bida, house Masaba which he succeed Etsu Bello of the house Usman Zaki his grandfather, the emirate has tree rulings houses and council Electors, Umaru was succeeded by Maliki (1884–1895) and later the title Etsu was introduced by Maliki until the succession to the Muhammadu Ndayako in 1935, Muhammadu Ndayako was the son of Muhammadu Makun of Dendo.

He built the General hospital of Bida, which was named after him, Umaru Sanda General Hospital, by the 13th Etsu Yahaya Abubakar, who was his nephew and successor.

== The Ndayako families ==
The name Ndayako in Nupe kingdom of Bida serves as synonymous with royalties; with more than 20 houses in Bida, it is a popular name known across the country. The family history came across during the reign of Etsu Muhammadu Ndayako known as Baba Kudu, who reigned for 27 years from 1935 to 1962, and Makun, the third Etsu Nupe son and grandson of Mallam Dendo mostly referred to as Manko, the Fulani Islamic Preacher from Kebbi sent by Usman dan Fodio to spread Islam in Nupe kingdom. The Ndayako are a large family, with Lineage spreading all over the kingdom and beyond. The tree ruling households, Usman Zaki, Masaba and Umaru Majigi have ruled the kingdom in rotation till today.

He died in September 2003 at Bida spending 28 years on the throne due to an unknown illness, after finishing the Project of Technical Committee for local government reforms.

== See also ==
- Abubakar Yahaya
- Muhammadu Ndayako

Preceded by Musa Bello	Etsu Nupe	Succeeded by Yahaya Abubakar
