= Usman Sarki =

10th Etsu Nupe and Federal minister of interior 1959-1962

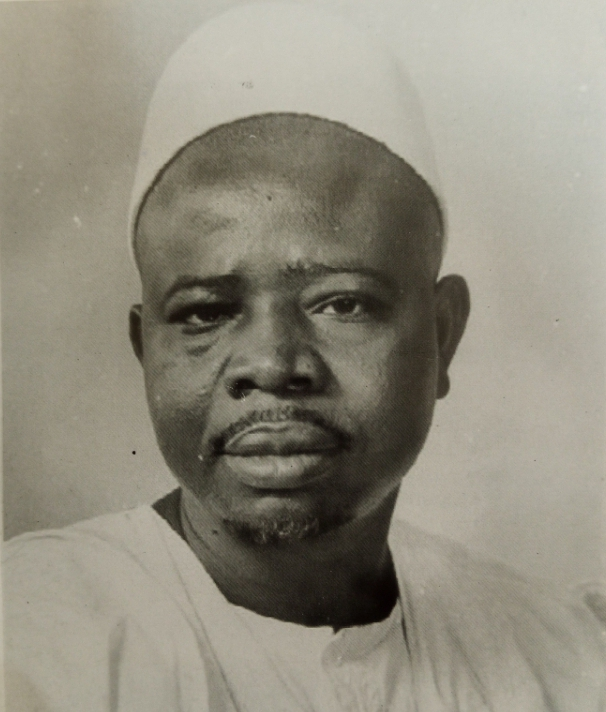

Federal Minister of Interior
- In office 23 December 1959 – 7 December 1962
- Prime Minister: Tafawa Balewa
- Preceded by: J. M. Johnson
- Succeeded by: Shehu Shagari

Etsu Nupe
- In office 1962–1969
- Preceded by: Muhammadu Ndayako
- Succeeded by: Musa Bello

Personal details
- Born: 1920 Bida
- Died: 1984 (aged 63–64)
- Party: Northern People Congress
- Education: Bida Middle School; University of Ibadan

Usman Sarki dan Malam Saidu MP, CFR (b. 1920 - 1984) was the Federal Minister of Interior from 1959 to 1962 succeeded J. M. Johnson and served as the 10th Etsu Nupe from 1962 to 1969 succeeding the 9th Etsu Nupe Muhammadu Ndayako. He was succeeded by his cousin, the 11th Etsu Nupe Musa Bello.

== Biography ==
Born into Masaba ruling house of Bida, his father Saidu Sarki was the 8th Etsu Nupe. He began his early education in the well known Bida Middle School from 1933 to 1943 and then the Kaduna College in 1944. In 1954 he studied development economics and an extra moral studies in the University of Ibadan for engineering.

== Career ==
He started his career as engineer and supervisor in Bida native authority before becoming a federal representative in 1955 on the platform of NPC and was secretary of works and survey serving as Federal representative. In 1960 he was federal minister of internal affairs before leaving in 1962 to succeed his uncle, HRH Etsu Nupe Muhammadu Ndayako, who had died. He was succeeded in the ministry by HE Alhaji Shehu Shagari.

He was part of the 1966 Northern delegation to deliberate in meetings between the major regions after the coup of 1966.

== Zaki and Masaba dynasty ==
Belonging to the Masaba dynasty, he struggled for the title of Etsu Nupe serving as a minister of internal affairs together with Usman Zaki's dynasty Abubakar Nakordi the father to the present 13th Etsu Nupe Yahaya Abubakar. He was the country's Federal Minister of Interior from 3 January 1960 to 29 October 1969 during the Abubakar Tafawa Balewa administration.

He died in 1984 at Sokoto on a visit to Sultan of Sokoto Sir Abubakar III his school mate and was buried in Bida Native ground.

== Notes ==
Preceded by Muhammadu Ndayako	Etsu Nupe	Succeeded by Musa Bello
