= Abd al-Rahman Tsatsa =

19th century Nupe scholar (died c. 1829)

- Title: Shehu

Personal life
- Born: Abd al-Rahman b. Muhammad c. 1756 Abaji (today in FCT, Nigeria)
- Died: c. 1829

Religious life
- Religion: Islam
- Denomination: Sunni
- Tariqa: Qadiri
- Movement: Sokoto jihad

Shehu Abd al-Rahman b. Muhammad al-Nufawi (c. 1756 – c.1829), also known as Tsatsa or Chacha, was a Nupe Muslim scholar, teacher, and military leader. One of Usman dan Fodio's flag-bearers during the Sokoto jihad, he became a prominent reformist figure in the spread of Islam across Nupeland. He was celebrated as both a pious scholar and a commander who sought to establish Islamic governance among his people, and later remembered in oral and written traditions as a martyr and saintly reformer.

In the early 19th century, Abd al-Rahman emerged as one of several contenders for power in a politically divided Nupeland. His campaigns marked the first phase of the jihad's expansion into the Middle Niger region. Over time, however, tensions grew between the Caliphate's two centres, Sokoto and Gwandu, over influence in Nupe. Caught between them, Abd al-Rahman gradually lost official backing from Sokoto as Gwandu shifted its support to Muhammad Dendo, a Fulani commander who also led the jihad in Nupeland and a close ally of Etsu Majia, ruler of western Nupe.

Although Emir Abdullahi of Gwandu is believed to have favoured Dendo's rise, historians note that he likely opposed Abd al-Rahman's murder at the hands of Dendo's followers, which occurred around the time of his death in 1829. The ambiguous response from Sokoto reflected Caliph Muhammad Bello's deference to Gwandu's authority in Nupe and illustrated the fragile relations between the two centres of the Caliphate following Usman's death in 1817.

== Biography ==
=== Early life ===
What is remembered of Abd al-Rahman's early life is largely obscured by later legendary accounts that presage his elevation to sainthood, and ultimately, his martyrdom.

According to the Nupe scholar Alkali Umar b. Muhammad (died 1918), Abd al-Rahman was born at Abaji, on the eastern marches of Nupeland, to an Arab father of Sharifian descent and a Nupe mother who gave her son traditional facial scars of her people. According to the alkali, Abd al-Rahman's father had emigrated to Nupe "at the time of a war between the Arabs and the Turks". He left Abaji before his son was born, around 1756.

After early studies among the local Muslim scholars, Abd al-Rahman is said to have traveled north to Sokoto, where he became a student of Shehu Usman dan Fodio. Owing to his learning and reputed karama, he developed a close relationship with Usman, which, according to Alkali Umar, made Usman's brother Abdullahi resent him. Umar suggests that this rivalry may have foreshadowed the later enmity between Abd al-Rahman and Abdullahi.

=== Nupe jihad ===
During the Sokoto jihad in the early 19th century, Abd al-Rahman emerged as one of the foremost jihadists in Nupeland, leading or participating in several campaigns against local non-Muslim groups with some support from the Sokoto Caliphate. Even before the jihad reached Nupeland, the region had experienced instability caused by competing factions vying for paramount control, including two rival royal lineages and Abd al-Rahman himself. One of his major jihad campaigns was against another one these competitors, Ikako (or Manmachu), an enigmatic Nupe general. The battle took place at Dabban, where Ikako may have been killed. Abd al-Rahman then made Kere (in northern Nupe) his main base, ruling there for about three years.

Around 1820, a combined Sokoto–Gwandu army launched a series of expeditions into Nupeland, the first known as Yakin Kusa. This campaign was followed by a treaty negotiated between the rival Nupe kings Idrisu of eastern Nupe and Majia of western Nupe, establishing a temporary peace and outlining their respective spheres of influence. At some point thereafter, Abd al-Rahman appears to have lost official support from Sokoto and Gwandu. The Scottish explorer Hugh Clapperton, who visited the region in May 1826, was in contact with Abd al-Rahman:

I had a letter from the learned Abdurahman, of Kora, a noted chief of banditti, and who once, with his followers, overran Nyffé, and held possession of the capital six months. He now keeps the town of Kora, a day's journey to the north-east, and is much feared by Mohamedan and Kafir. He is a native of Nyffé. He is particularly anxious that I should visit him, as he wants my acquaintance, and begs I will give him the Psalms of David in Arabic, which he hears I have got. His letter was written on part of the picture of the frontispiece of an [sic] European book, apparently Spanish or Portuguese. He says he has something to communicate to me, which cannot be done but by a personal interview; but unless he come to Koolfu I told his messenger, I could not see him.

Clapperton's description of Abd al-Rahman as a "chief of banditti" suggests his marginalisation and outlaw status by that period. According to historian Abdullahi Smith, before the Kalambaina revolt of 1820 in Gwandu, Abd al-Rahman still enjoyed Sokoto's backing, but afterwards Gwandu shifted its support to Muhammad Dendo, a Fulani scholar active in Nupe. Dendo, once a Qur'anic teacher and diviner, became involved in Nupe politics, allying with Etsu Majia against his rivals, including Abd al-Rahman. Early Caliphate campaigns may have sought to install Abd al-Rahman as emir of Nupe, but in later ones, especially after 1820, Gwandu instead favoured Dendo as their preferred leader of the Muslims in Nupeland.

=== Death ===
The most widely accepted account of Abd al-Rahman's death comes from Muhammad Junaidu, the Waziri of Sokoto, whose Ta'nis al-ahibba'ʾ (1958) asserts that he was killed around 1828–1829 during a raid led by Muhammad Dendo's followers. The waziri's account is supported by oral traditions collected in Bida and Mokwa, both of which claim Dendo's forces as responsible for Abd al-Rahman's death.

Much is still unclear as to whether the Caliphate's leadership approved of Abd al-Rahman's killing. Historian Michael Mason argues that while Abdullahi dan Fodio, emir of Gwandu, may have supported or even advocated replacing Abd al-Rahman with Dendo, "being an idealist and a scholar as well as a political leader he could not support the claim that 'Abd al-Rahman was a rebel, and even less his murder and the imprisonment of his followers." Abdullahi died in April 1829, and, as Mason notes, "his objections seemed to have died with him." Abdullahi Smith later suggested that Caliph Muhammad Bello's reluctance to support Abd al-Rahman may have been to grant Gwandu freedom of action in Nupe, as that region fell under its jurisdiction. Relations between Sokoto and Gwandu had remained delicate since Usman's death in 1817 and continued so throughout Bello's reign.

== Legacy ==
Although overshadowed by Muhammad Dendo, whose lineage established the ruling dynasty of Bida, Abd al-Rahman is remembered in both oral and written traditions as an early mujaddid and continues to be venerated as a wali (saint) and shahid (martyr), especially among the Nupe people.

Some of Abd al-Rahman's surviving writings include several poems composed in both Arabic and Nupe, focusing on fiqh (Islamic jurisprudence) and madh al-nabi. These manuscripts are among the earliest known examples of Nupe Ajami, and are today preserved in the Northern History Research Scheme collection at the Ahmadu Bello University Library, Zaria.

== Sources ==
=== Oral traditions ===
Accounts of Abd al-Rahman's life remain widespread in Nupe oral tradition, where he is remembered as a scholar, preacher, militant revivalist, and saint. Stories recorded around Nupeland recall his jihad campaigns and establishment of mosques.

=== Alkali Umar's chronicle ===
The fullest local written account of Abd al-Rahman's life is in Tarikh al-Balad Raba wa Tarikh Shaykh 'Abd al-Rahman Mujaddid by Alkali Umar b. Muhammad (d. 1918), noted as the most learned Nupe scholar of his day. The chronicle portrays Abd al-Rahman as a saintly reformer endowed with miraculous powers. It recounts his jihad campaigns, his victory over Ikako, and his brief rule at Kere before being killed by Etsu Majia in 1819. Although historians regard much of the account as hagiographic, elements are corroborated by other local traditions. It is also worth noting that Umar's ties to the Fulani ruling family of Bida, descendants of Muhammad Dendo, may have influenced his portrayal of events.

=== Sokoto sources ===
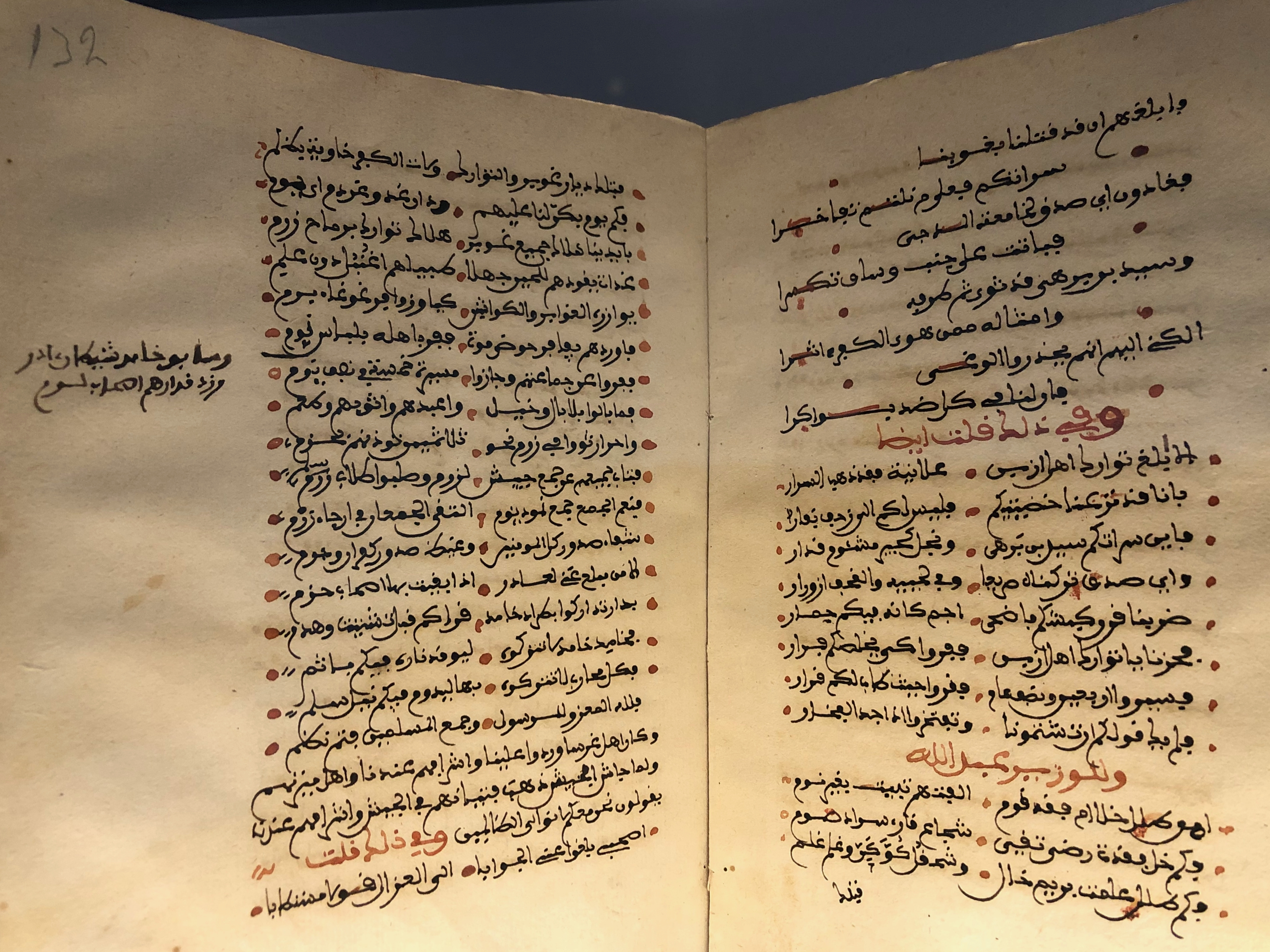
Copy of Muhammad Bello's Infaq al-Maisur

Mentions of Abd al-Rahman and his campaigns also appear in the Arabic chronicles of some Sokoto scholars. In Muhammad Bello's Infaq al-Maysur (c. 1812), one passage refers explicitly to a campaign that likely took place in April 1810, which provides the earliest record of his collaboration with the Caliphate's armies:

Then, when the season of rabi' had passed, there returned our people who had gone to Nupeland to help 'Abd al-Rahman al-Nufawi against the army of Nupe. And indeed they fulfilled their trust. We put forward our best endeavour and brought back what there was to bring.

Abdullahi dan Fodio's Tazyin al-Waraqat (1813) records consecutive years of military expeditions into Nupeland between 1810 and 1813, though without naming Abd al-Rahman directly. Both sources imply that the Caliphate initially regarded him as a legitimate ally in the jihad. The later account of Waziri Muhammad Junaidu, in Ta'nis al-Ahibba' bi-dhikr Umara' Gwandu (1958), presents the most comprehensive account from a Sokoto perspective.
