= Mohammed Bello =

Mohammed Bello or Muhammad Bello is a common Fulani name, which may refer to:

- Muhammed Bello (1781–1837), Sultan of Sokoto, 1814–1836
- Mohammed Bello (1930–2004), Chief Justice of Nigeria, 1987–1995
- Haliru Mohammed Bello (born 1945), Nigerian statesman and politician
- Mohammed Adamu Bello (born 1957), Nigerian politician and businessman
- Mohammed Bello Adoke (born 1963), Minister of Justice, 2010–2015
- Mohammed Musa Bello (born 1959), Minister of the Federal Capital Territory, 2015–present
- Mohammed Bello Abubakar (1924–2017), Nigerian polygamist
