= Mohammed Bello Abubakar =

Nigerian imam and scholar

Muhammadu Bello Abubahkar Masaba Bida (28 January 1924 – 28 January 2017), also known as Mohammed Bello Abubakar, was born in Nigeria. Masaba is known for having stirred up controversy in his hometown Bida, Niger State due to his extensive polygamy, and for being outspoken, he was charged under Sharia law and sent to prison in 2008 for refusing to divorce 82 of his wives. Islam limits the number of wives a Muslim man can have to four, mandating they must be all treated equally. He married 120 wives, divorced 10, and fathered 203 children. At the time of his death in 2017, some of his wives were believed to be pregnant.

Masaba was a teacher and imam. He lived in an entire apartment block with his family. Masaba claimed that he never pursued his wives, and that he was sought by them due to his reputation as a healer. Most of his wives were younger than 30, and a few younger than his elder children. In interviews with Al Jazeera English, his wives claimed he was a good husband and father.

== Interpretation of the Quran ==
The Quran states that a man may marry up to four wives mandating they must be all treated equally. Masaba claimed that when the Quran set a law, it must also set a punishment for offenders, and no punishment was given for this offense.

During a prison interview Masaba told The Christian Science Monitor:

"If God permits me, I will marry more than 86 wives. A normal human being could not marry 86 – but I can only by the grace of God, I married 86 women and there is peace in the house – if there is peace, how can this be wrong?"

== Interrogations and trials ==
After the death pronouncement on him by the Islamic group, Jama'atu Nasril Islam (JNI), the Bida Emirate Council and an assembly of Islamic leaders invited Masaba for interrogation. Deliberations were given in Etsu Nupe's palace Bida and the Etsu Nupe of Bida, Yahaya Abubakar read out a verdict saying that Masaba should divorce 82 of the 86 wives within 48 hours or leave the entire Nupe Kingdom as his safety could not be guaranteed within the kingdom. At the expiration of the ultimatum, Masaba refused to divorce any of his wives and denied ever promising this.

In 2008 Bello was arrested by Islamic authorities and tried before a Sharia court. Before his trial at the Sharia court, Police in Niger State gave him a clean bill, as the state command declared that nothing incriminating was found in his house. The leader of the police team, that arrested the Islamic cleric in Bida before 27 September 2008, Deputy Commissioner of Police, John Olayemi declared:

"We found nothing incriminating in his house. There was no knife, no pistol or skull in his house when we went to invite him to the headquarters for a chat."

Olayemi explained that the command of arresting Masaba acted on an instrument of Upper Sharia Court.

== Life in prison ==
On October 6, 2008, while in detention in Minna Prison, an Upper Sharia Court Judge in Minna, Abdulmalik Imam, transferred Masaba's case to a Chief Magistrate's Court in Minna after admitting the court lacked jurisdiction. Masaba was still remanded in prison custody at the instance of the Sharia Court.

Thousands of protestors gathered to protest against his actions, and claimed that if he were released, they would not allow him to return to his home. His wives announced their outrage at his arrest. Due to his persistent refusal to divorce 82 of his wives during his trial, he was sentenced to death. The sentence was lifted in early September 2008. Masaba still faced eviction from his home. The case was reported globally and throughout Nigeria, angering many Nigerian Muslims.

Following the case, Masaba told the BBC:

"A man with ten wives would collapse and die, but my own power is given by Allah. That is why I have been able to control 86 of them."

== Release ==
On 12 November 2008, a Federal High Court sitting in Maitama, Abuja ordered the release of Masaba from detention in Minna Prison with immediate effect. The trial high court judge, Justice G.O. Kolawole attached no condition to his release. The judge also ordered the Inspector General of Police, Mike Okiro, to ensure the protection of Masaba's fundamental rights to life, liberty and privacy, as enshrined in the 1999 constitution of Nigeria, through the Niger State Commissioner of Police. Masaba returned to his hometown, Bida, on 13 November 2008.

In July 2011 Mu'azu Babangida Aliyu, the governor of Niger State, said "though we have Sharia in place in the state, but we have no law to pin him down". Niger State government's effort to prosecute Masaba was unsuccessful because of legal lacuna. The Speaker of Niger State House of Assembly, Adamu Usman, disclosed that various attempts to prosecute Masaba ran into hitches because there was no provision in the law of the state to effect his prosecution.

Usman said:

"As Attorney General then I personally appeared before Sharia court, Minna, as prosecutor to prosecute the man but later discovered that Sharia courts in Niger State cannot deal with the case. No provision made in Penal code C.P.C or Sharia administration of Justice law to deal with such cases."

== Appearance on media ==
Masaba is frequently depicted by the media as "the man with 86 wives." Contrary to some media reports that Masaba divorced 82 out of his 86 wives, he refused to divorce any of his wives.

In 2011, Masaba reappeared in articles concerning an alleged plot to disenfranchise his family. Members of his family were prevented by thugs from registering to vote. Nine members of the Masaba family were injured by thugs whenever they attempted to register to vote.

After a Federal High Court sitting in Abuja ordered the release of Masaba from detention, he had 18 more children, having a total of 138. Masaba came into limelight with another super polygamist, Ziona Chana of India in 2011. As of May 2011, Masaba had 89 wives and 133 children while India's Ziona Chana had 39 wives, 94 children and 33 grandchildren.

In June 2012, Masaba had an interview with Jide Orintunsin where he debunked his rumoured death and said:

"Large number of wives? I only have 97 wives. I am still going to marry more. I will keep marrying them for as long I am alive. Whoever is fighting me because of my wives or love life. Such an individual has missed it. Left for me, I would have married maybe two wives, but what I am doing is divine. It is an assignment and I will keep marrying till the end of time. I just want to advise those fighting against the number of my wives to stop because such people are waging war against God, their creator."
