= Etsu Bello Maliki =

8th Etsu Nupe

Bello Maliki
- Etsu Nupe
- Reign: 1916 – 1926
- Coronation: 1916
- Predecessor: Muhammadu Majigi
- Successor: Saidu Mamudu
- Born: 1887; Bida
- Died: 1926 (aged 38–39)
- House: Usman Zaki rulings dynasty
- Religion: Sunni Islam

Bello Dan Maliki (1887 – 1926) was the 8th Etsu Nupe King of Nupe. His reign lasted from 1916 to 1926.

In 1918, he was the first monarch to have bought a car. At the time roads were not constructed in Bida, and the whole community of Nigeria and the emirate benefited from the car.

He belonged to the Usman Zaki ruling house of Fulani Nupe rulings dynasty.
