= Ahmed Muhammad Ketso =

Former deputy governor of Niger state

His Excellency; Alhaji; Ahmed Muhammad Ketso
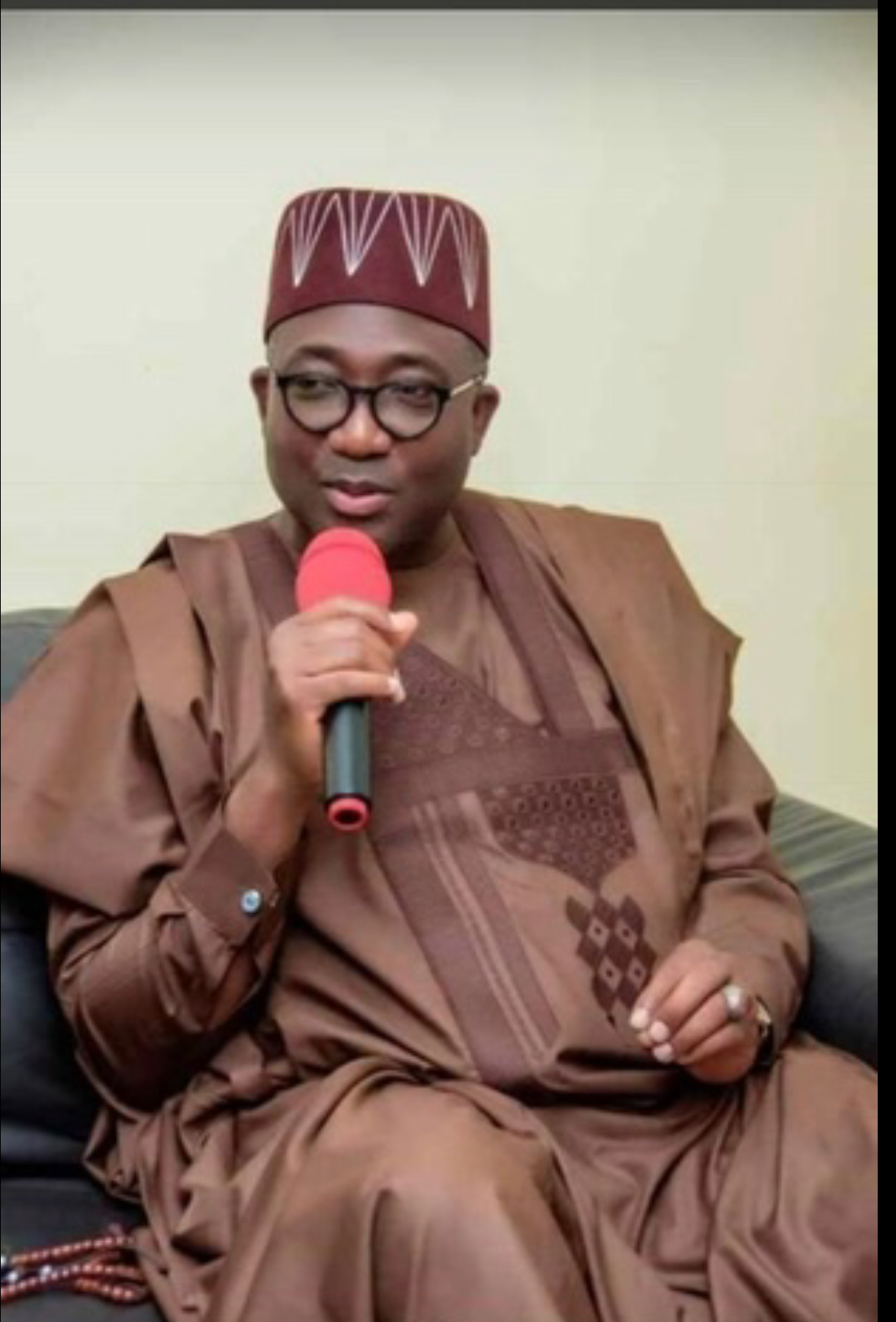
- Ketso in 2020

Deputy Governor of Niger State
- In office 2019–2023
- President: Mohammed Buhari
- Governor: Abubakar Sani Bello
- Succeeded by: Yakubu Garba

Personal details
- Born: 27 July 1969 (age 57) Mokwa, Niger State, Nigeria
- Party: All Progressives Congress
- Other political affiliations: All Nigeria Peoples Party (ANPP)
- Education: Federal Polytechnic, Bida (ND)
- Occupation: Politician

Alhaji Ahmed Muhammad Ketso is a Nigerian politician who served as the deputy governor of Niger State from 2015 to 2023.

== Early life and education ==
Ketso was born on 27 July 1969 in Ketso village in Mokwa local government area of Niger state. He completed his primary education in 1976 and passed out in 1981, and his secondary school education 1991. He obtained his national diploma in Financial Studies at Federal Polytechnic, Bida from 1995 to 1998.

== Career ==
In 2007, he contested for the Niger State House of Assembly and in 2011, he contested for the House of Representatives' seat under the now defunct All Nigeria Peoples Party (ANPP). In 2015, he was elected as the deputy governor candidate under the All Progressives Congress during the 2015 gubernatorial election and re-elected in 2019. In 2023, he lost the party tickets to contest for the governorship position to Mohammed Umar Bago.
