= J. M. Johnson =

Nigerian politician

Joseph Modupe Johnson
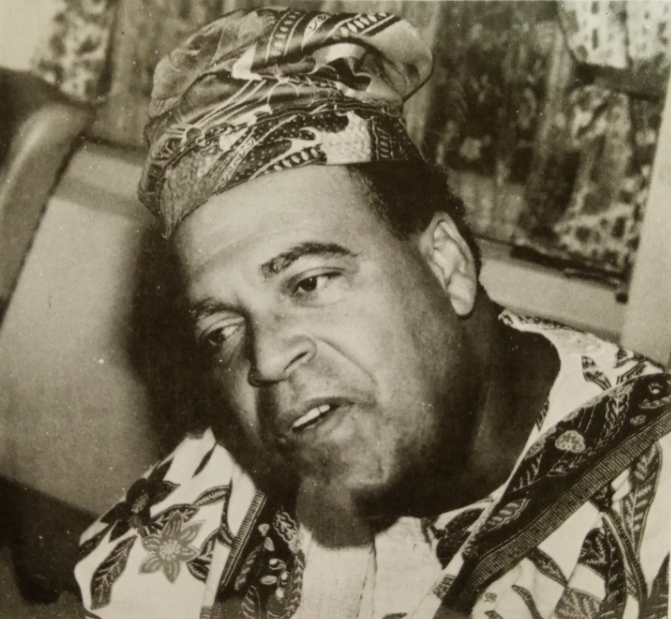

Federal Minister for Labour, Welfare, & Sports
- In office 1959–1964

Federal Minister of the Interior
- In office 1957–1959
- Succeeded by: Usman Sarki

Personal details
- Education: William Wilberforce Academy

Military service
- Branch/service: Nigerian Army
- Years of service: 1939–1946

Chief Joseph Modupe Johnson CFR, (30 March 1912 – 15 June 1987), was a Nigerian politician and Federal Cabinet Minister.

== Life ==
He was born in Lagos, and was educated at the William Wilberforce Academy.

After a brief stint in the Nigerian Army during World War II, he returned to civil life after the war's end and was a bank clerk, and a radio broadcaster for a few years. From 1948, he tried his hands in business and politics, was elected into the Ibadan District Council the same year, and later became the first and only ever non-indigene to serve as the chairman of the council. In 1956 he became a Nigerian federal cabinet minister and served in internal affairs, later in labour and social welfare and sports, acting twice as prime minister in the coalition Government.

In these capacities, he distinguished himself by resigning as President of the Nigerian branch of the ILO, protesting the admission of South Africa as member. He built the first and largest National Sports Stadium in Lagos, attended the victorious battle of Nigeria's Middleweight and Light Heavyweight Boxing champion of the world, Dick Tiger vs Gene Fullmer in California, and in collaboration with London-based world-renowned boxing promoter, Jack Solomons, staged the very first world boxing title fight in Africa, in Ibadan, Western Nigeria, between Tiger and Fullmer, in 1963, well before the much publicized Rumble in the Jungle fight between Muhammad Ali and George Foreman in Zaire, in 1974.

In 1963 he retired from politics by declining to contest the General Elections. This was, as he put it, to make way for the young, which endeared him to many Nigerians. Born into Lagosian and Brazilian families in Lafiaji, Lagos, he was described as tall, handsome, flamboyant, gregarious and renowned as a ladies man. He is said to have sired several children from mothers of diverse backgrounds and ethnicities. His second son, Abiola, followed in his footsteps, became a politician and was a Regional Minister in Lagos.

== Sources ==
- Ronald Segal, et al. Political Africa: A Who's Who of Personalities and Parties. Praeger (1961)
- Nigeria's book of firsts: a handbook on pioneer Nigerian citizens (p. 191)
- West Africa, Issues 3638-3650 (p. 1365)
