= Muhammadu Bangana =

19th-century Fulani leader in Nigeria

Mallam Muhammadu Bangana
- Born: 18th-century Kingdom of Kebbi
- Died: 1832; Rabba, Kingdom of Nupe
- Other names: Mallam Dendo, Manko
- Occupation: preacher
- Known for: Founding the Bida Emirate in Nupe Kingdom
- Children: 7 sons and 2 daughters, including: Usman Zaki; Gogo Habiba; Muhammad Saba

Mallam Muhammadu Bangana (also known as Mallam Dendo or Manko) was a prominent historical figure in the 19th century in what is now modern-day Nigeria. He hailed from the Fulani community in Kebbi, located in the Northern Nigeria.

== Biography ==
During the 19th century, when the Central Sudan region was undergoing significant changes due to the conquests led by Uthman dan Fodio, Mallam Dendo migrated to Nupe country. This period marked the Nupe People's subjugation by the Emir of Gwandu.

Mallam Dendo participated in the transformation of the Nupe Kingdom. He is credited with establishing the Bida Emirate, a new political entity that lasted for almost 200 years, and introducing reforms that modernized Nupe society.

Mallam Dendo was interested in studying Islam and became a leader in his community. His biography, from learning about Islam to founding the Bida Emirate in Nupe Kingdom, reflects his role in Nupe history.

Mallam Dendo's legacy is still relevant today. He is regarded as a significant figure in Nupe history and culture.

== See also ==
- Abd al-Rahman Tsatsa
