= Bida Setar =

Bida Setar بيداستر
- Village
- Location within Iran
- Coordinates: 28°39′04″N 60°57′56″E
- Country: Iran
- Province: Sistan and Baluchestan
- County: Khash
- Bakhsh: Nukabad
- Rural District: Taftan-e Jonubi

Population (2006)
  - Total: 283
- Time zone: UTC+3:30 (IRST)
  - Summer (DST): UTC+4:30 (IRDT)

Bida Setar (Persian: بيداستر, also Romanized as Bīdā Setar; also known as Bīd Setar) is a village in Taftan-e Jonubi Rural District, Nukabad District, Khash County, Sistan and Baluchestan Province, Iran. At the 2006 census, its population was 283, in 53 families.
