= Federal Medical Centre, Bida =

Geography
- Location: Niger state, Northern Nigeria, Niger State, Nigeria

Organisation
- Type: General hospital

Services
- Emergency department: Available

History
- Opened: 1997

Links
- Website: https://fmcbida.org/
- Lists: Hospitals in Nigeria

The Federal Medical Centre, Bida (FMCBida) is a federal medical center owned by the federal government of Nigeria and built by the Sani Abacha military administration. It was built in 1997 and it also has a medical institution resided beside it in Bida, Niger state.

The medical center has three major role headed which Chairman Management is the head of office Dr Ishaq Usman, it has an outpost at Gurara Local Government.

== Government ==
With the new administration in 2018, the Board Management inaugurated a new member commissioned by Prof. Adewale Minister of Health to create opportunities for the youth who participated in and supported the victory of the new government.

== Department ==
Clinical departments are:

- Department of Medicine
- Department of Ophthalmology
- Department of pharmacy
- Department of physiotherapy
- Department of Mental health
- Department of Gynecology
- Department of Radiology
- Department of Nursing
- Department of NHIS
- Department of Accident and Emergency
- Department of Anaesthesia.

Non clinical are:

- Department of Administration
- Department of Finance
- Department of Internal Audits
- Department of Works and Estate

=== Medical laboratory ===
- Microbiology
- Chemical pathology
- Hematology

Other departments in the medical center include:

- Comprehensive Health Centre, Zungeru.
- Family Medicine Practice Centre, Lambata.

== CMD ==
The current chief medical director of the medical center is Doctor Abubakar Usman. He was appointed by the former president Mohammad Buhari in 2021. He was also reappointed for a second tenure after his initial 4 year tenure formally by the Federal Ministry of Health and Social Welfare on April 14, 2026.

== Renovation of facilities ==
Federal medical center bida was renovated and there are increases in the bed capacity of the hospital to be able to contain more patients. The general out-patient clinic was also renovated.

== See also ==
- Federal Medical Center, Azare
