= Baeda Maryam =

Baeda Maryam may refer to:

- Baeda Maryam I (1448–1478), Emperor of Ethiopia
- Atse Baeda Maryam (1787–1788), proclaimed Emperor of Ethiopia
- Baeda Maryam II (r. 1795), Emperor of Ethiopia
- Baeda Maryam III (r. 1826), Emperor of Ethiopia
