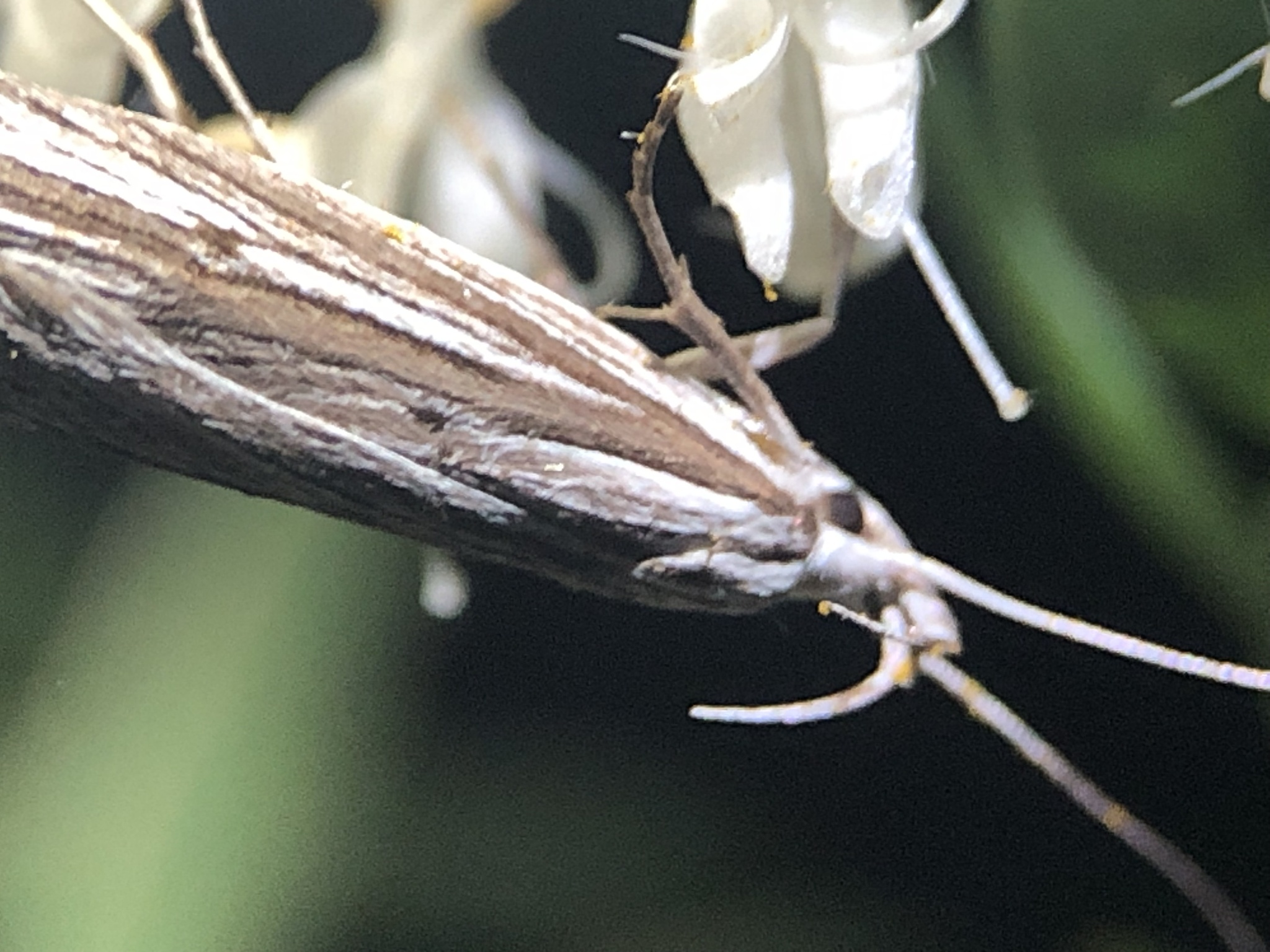
- Bida radiosella, Australia

Scientific classification
- Domain: Eukaryota
- Kingdom: Animalia
- Phylum: Arthropoda
- Class: Insecta
- Order: Lepidoptera
- Clade: Apoditrysia
- Superfamily: Gelechioidea
- Family: Xyloryctidae
- Genus: Bida; Walker, 1864
- Species: B. radiosella

Binomial name
- Bida radiosella (Walker, 1863)

Synonyms
- Psecadia radiosella Walker, 1863; Bida crambella Walker, 1864

= Bida radiosella =

Sole species in xyloryctid moth genus Bida

Bida is a monotypic moth genus in the family Xyloryctidae described by Francis Walker in 1864. Its only species, Bida radiosella, described by the same author one year earlier, is found in Australia, where it has been recorded from New South Wales, South Australia, Tasmania, Victoria and Western Australia.

The wingspan is 23–29 mm. The forewings are white with all veins marked with fine fuscous lines mixed posteriorly with blackish. There are three pale fuscous longitudinal streaks, the first from the base beneath the costa to the costa beyond the middle, extending along it to near the apex, the second median, from the base to the apex, united with the first at the base, finely edged with dark fuscous beneath on the basal third, and above from one-third to three-fifths, the third is less marked, subdorsal and runs from near the base to near the tornus. There are indications of faint pale fuscous streaks, between the veins towards the tornus. The hindwings are whitish grey.
