= Usman Zaki =

1st Etsu Nupe

- Etsu Nupe
- Reign: 1856-1859
- Coronation: 1856
- Predecessor: First appointed
- Successor: Ma'a Saba the Second
- Born: c. 1790; Gwandu Emirate
- Died: 1859
- Father: Mallam Dendo
- Religion: Sunni Islam

Usman Zaki Dan Dendo (c. 1790–1859) was the first Etsu Nupe, the traditional ruler of the Nupe Kingdom.

== History ==
Usman Zaki was the first son of Islamic preacher Malam Dendo, a Fulani man from Gwandu who was sent from Sokoto, Nigeria to introduce Islam into the Nupe Kingdom. The name "Usman Zaki" is renowned for being the first ruling household of Bida Emirate. He was the first emir in Bida to become Etsu Nupe ("King of Nupe"). He introduced this title in 1856, during his second term as emir, defeating his rival Malam Umar Bahaushe, a Fulani man. The title was proclaimed during the civil war of Nupe in 1847, which lasted until 1856.

Between 1840 and 1857, Etsu Usman Zaki appointed Ogba for the North-East Yoruba territories. Some of these Ogba were Maiyaki for Bunu and Itaka for East Yagba.

Usman Zaki reigned for less than four years. During his reign, he resided at the military camp in the Bini area. It was during his reign that the city of Bida was renamed and made the capital.

He died in 1859 and was succeeded by Ma'a Saba the Second, who reigned for four years, and then by Majigi the Third, who reigned from 1884 until his death in 1895.
