= Federal Polytechnic Bida =

Public polytechnic in Nigeria

Federal Polytechnic, Bida
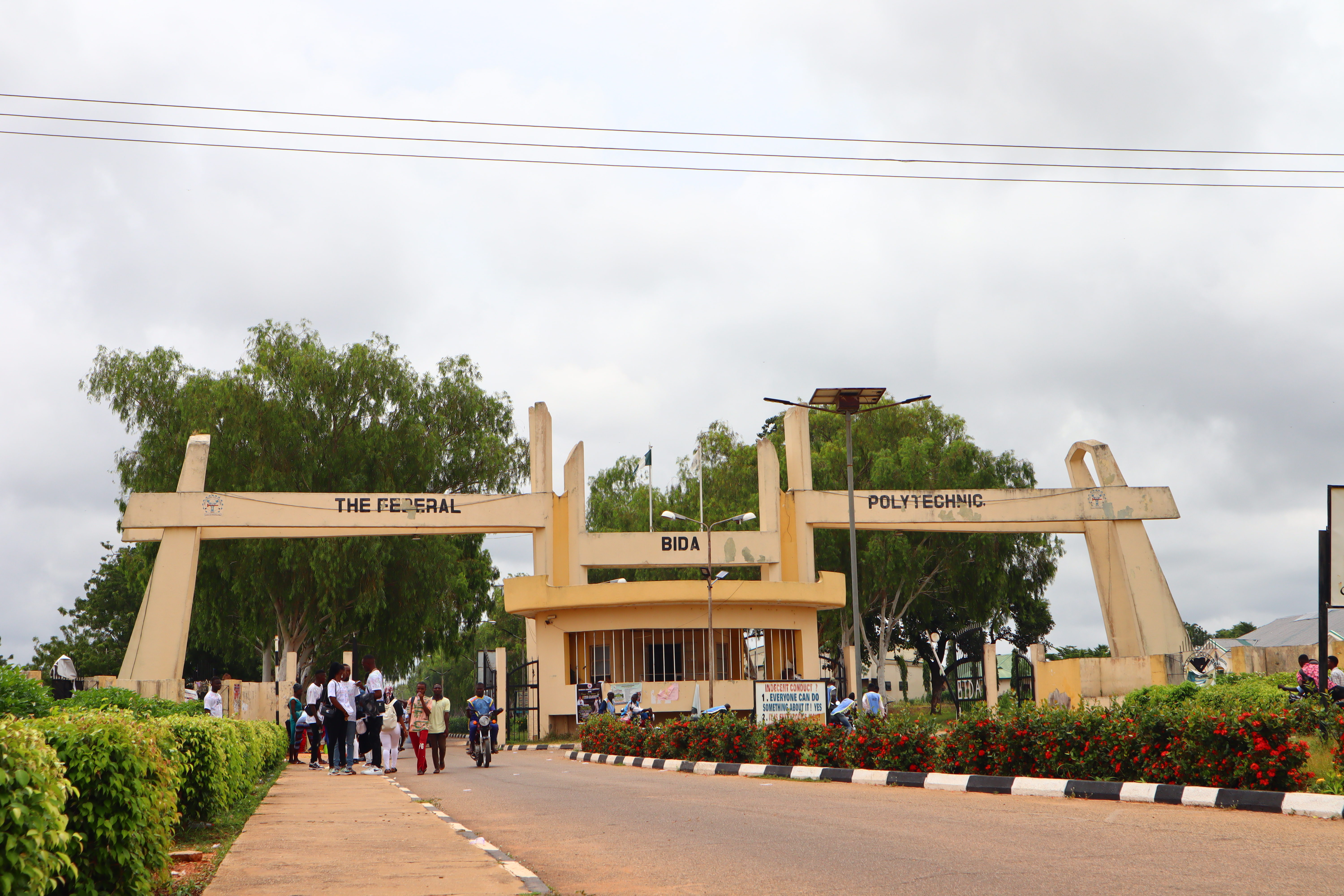
- Other names: FPB, Fedpoly, Bidapoly, Polybida
- Motto: Technologically skilled, morally sound and entrepreneurial
- Type: public
- Established: 1977; 49 years ago
- Rector: Dr. Engr. A.H. Baba
- Academic staff: 200
- Administrative staff: 97
- Students: 4500
- Undergraduates: 1200
- Location: Bida Road, Doko, Niger State, Nigeria; 9.041°N 6.005°E
- Website: fedpolybida.edu.ng

Federal Polytechnic, Bida is a polytechnic school based in Niger State, in north central Nigeria. It opened in 1977.

== History ==
Federal Polytechnic Bida was established in 1977 following a decision of the Federal Government of Nigeria to move the institution to Bida. Before then, it was Federal College of Technology, Kano.

The first academic session started in April, 1978 with the population of 211 students and 11 senior staff, 33 junior staff. Federal Polytechnic, Bida is a Federal Government tertiary institution situated in Bida, Niger State, Nigeria. Currently, there are seven faculties in the institution,

== Faculties ==
The institution has seven faculties:

- School of Applied and Natural Sciences
- School of Business Administration and Management
- School of Engineering Technology
- School of Basic and General Studies
- School of Environmental Studies
- School of Financial Studies
- School of Information and Communication Technology
Campus of Bida polytechnic

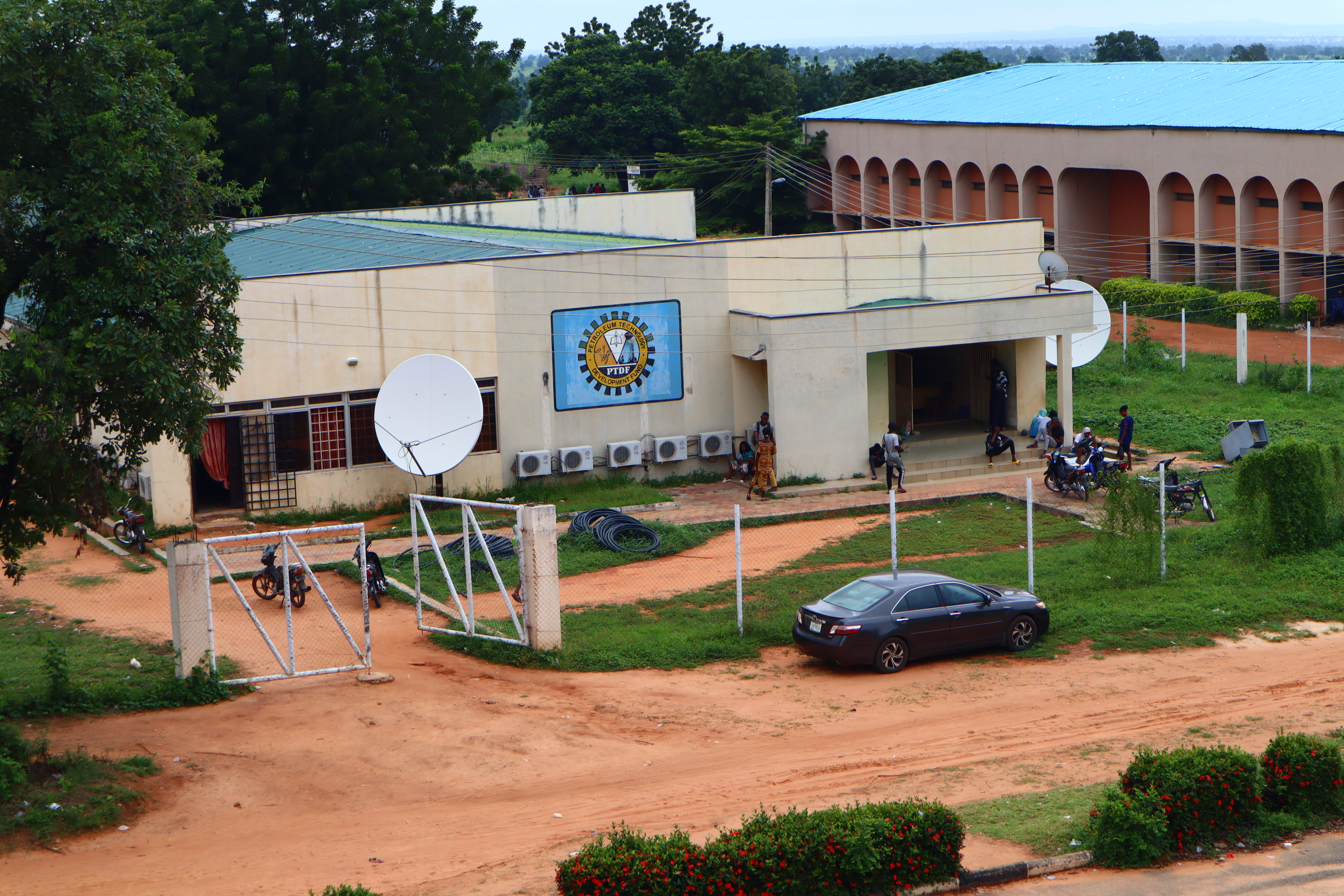
MSI building

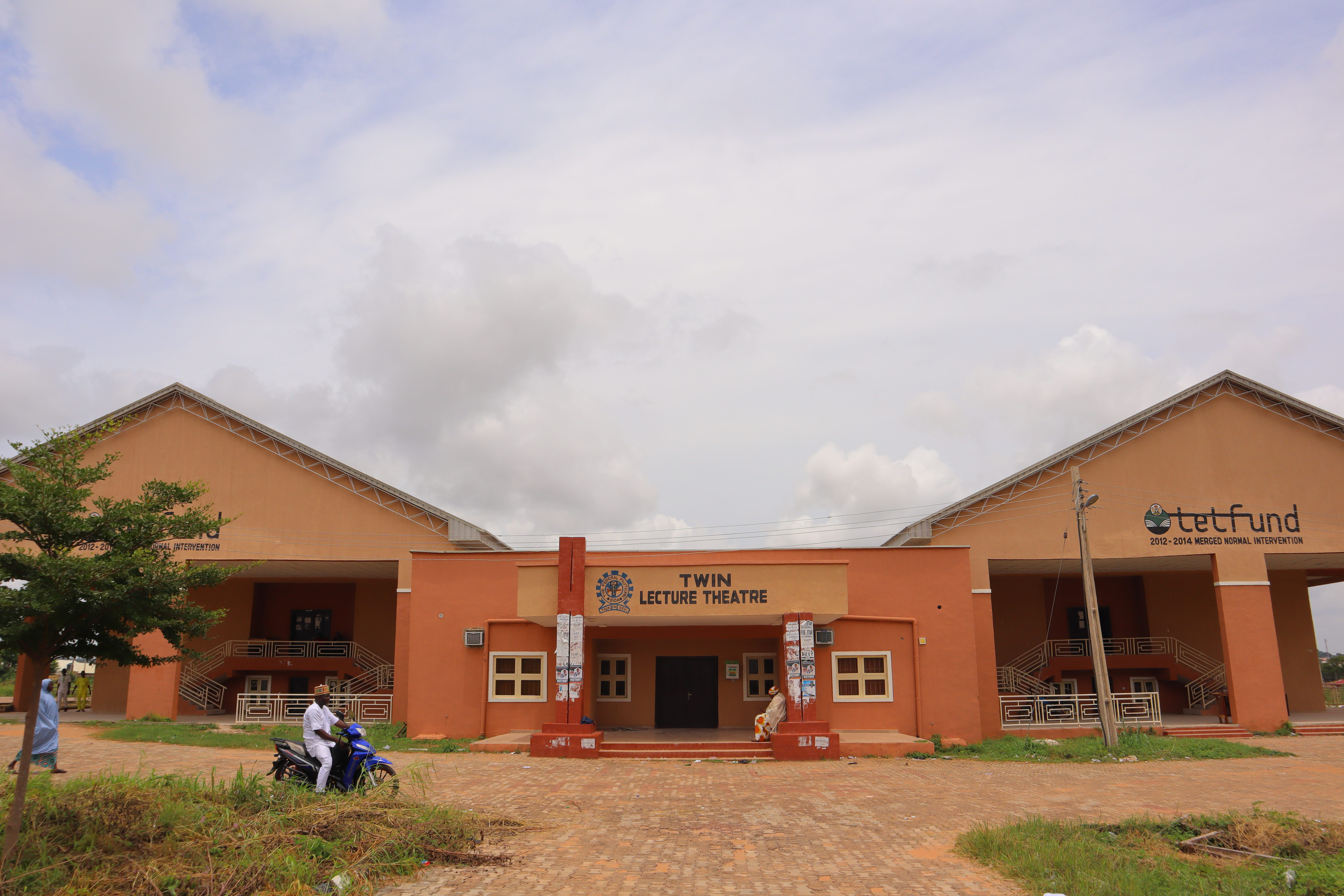
Twin lecture theatre

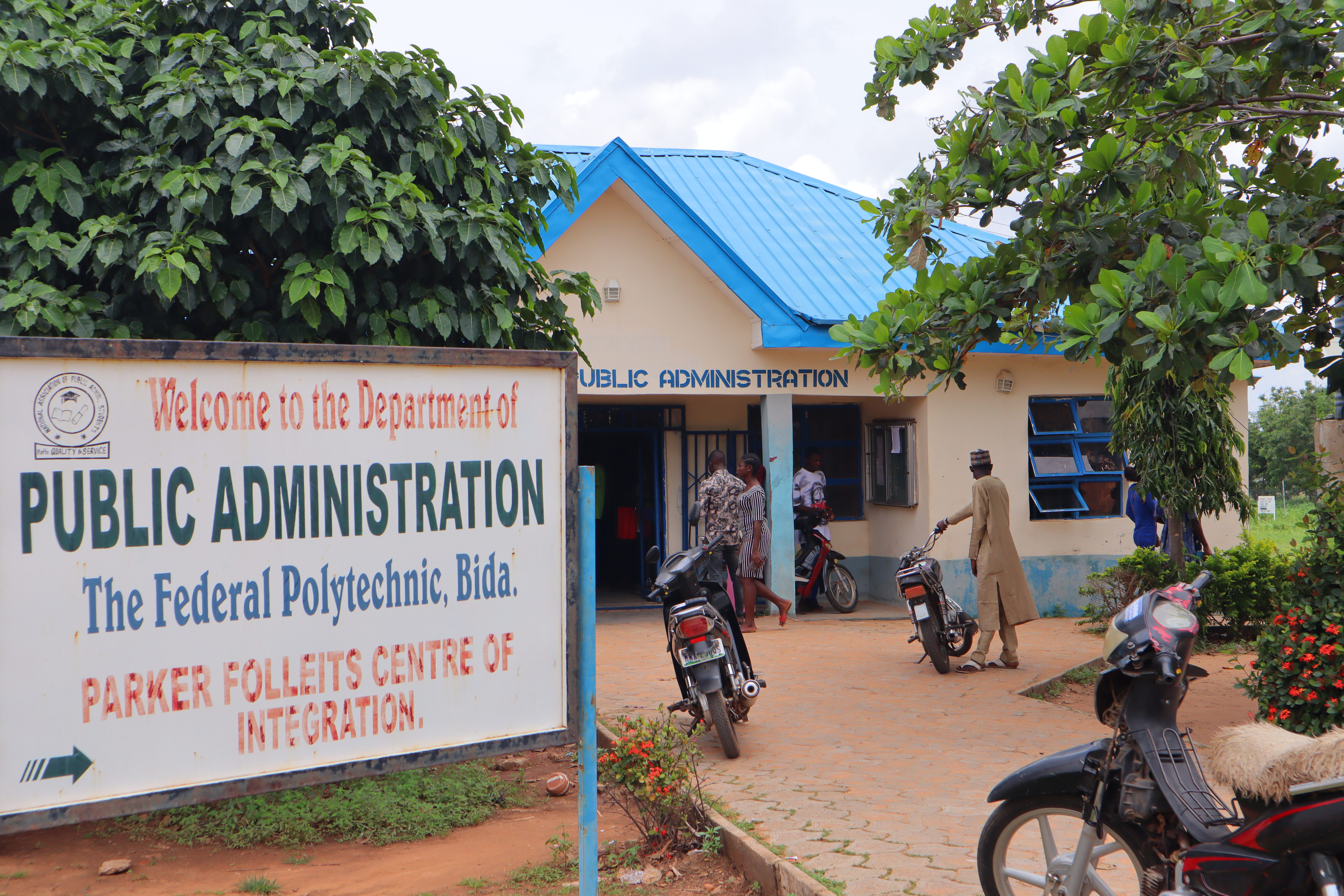
Department of Public Administration

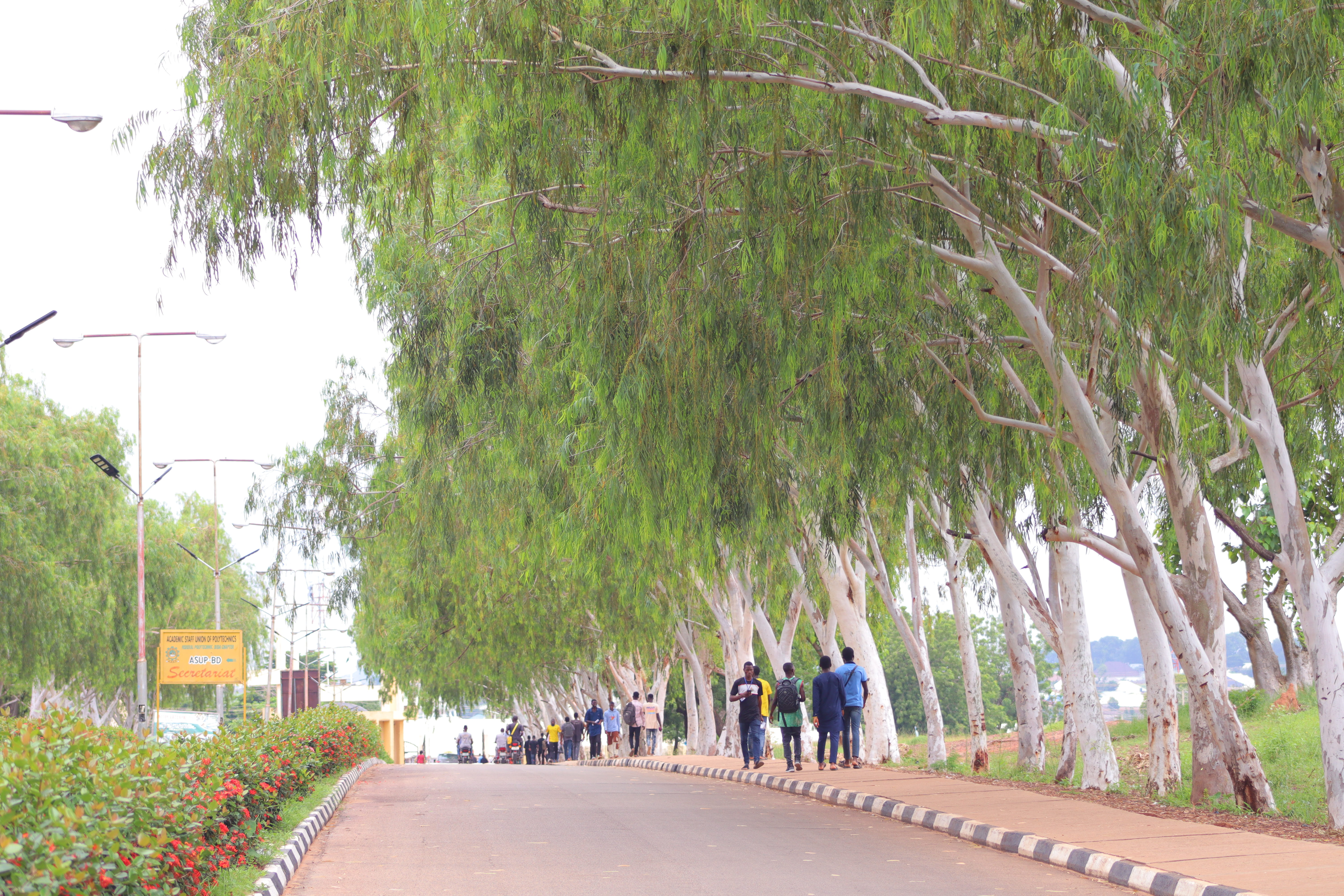
Students on campus grounds

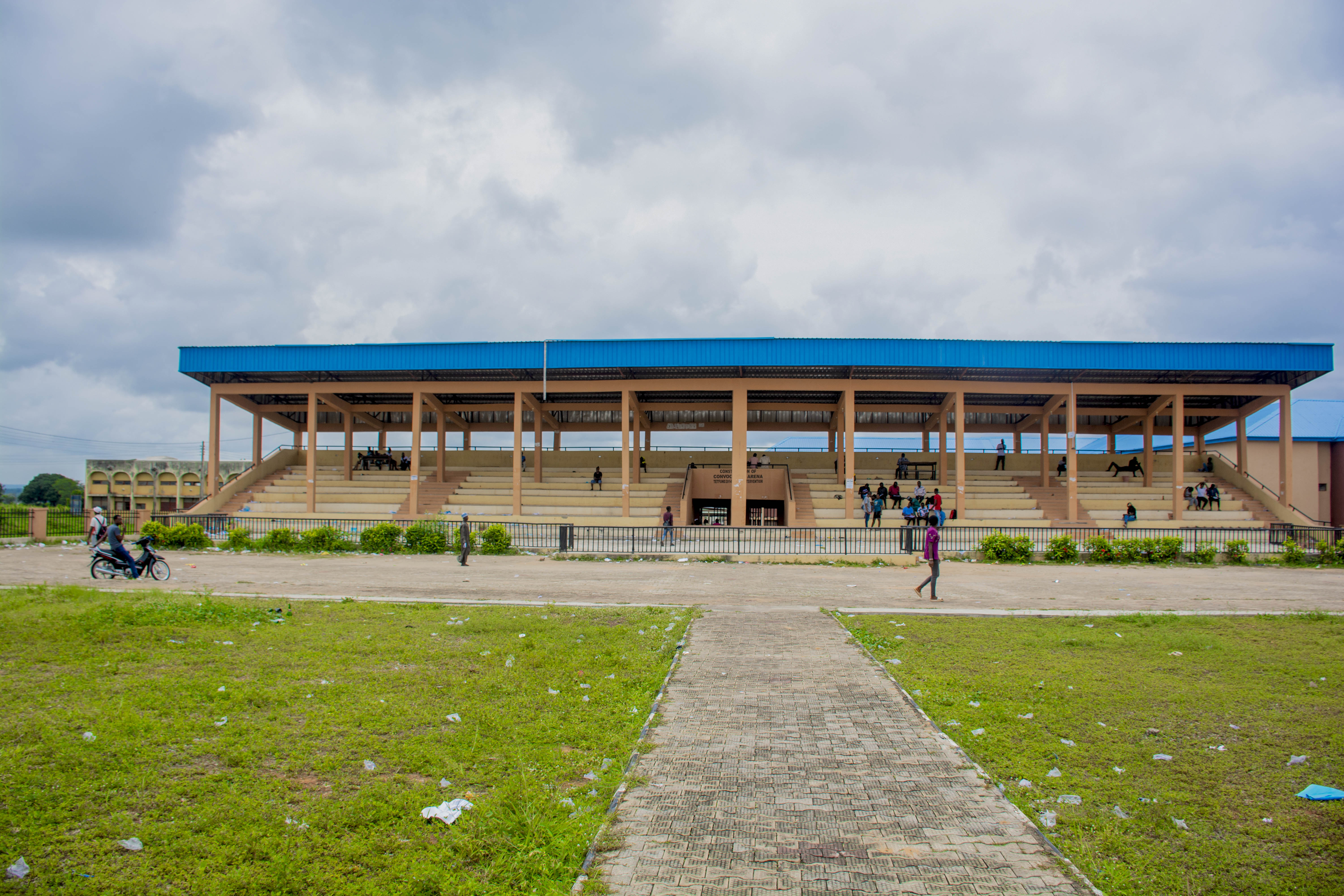
Convocation Arena

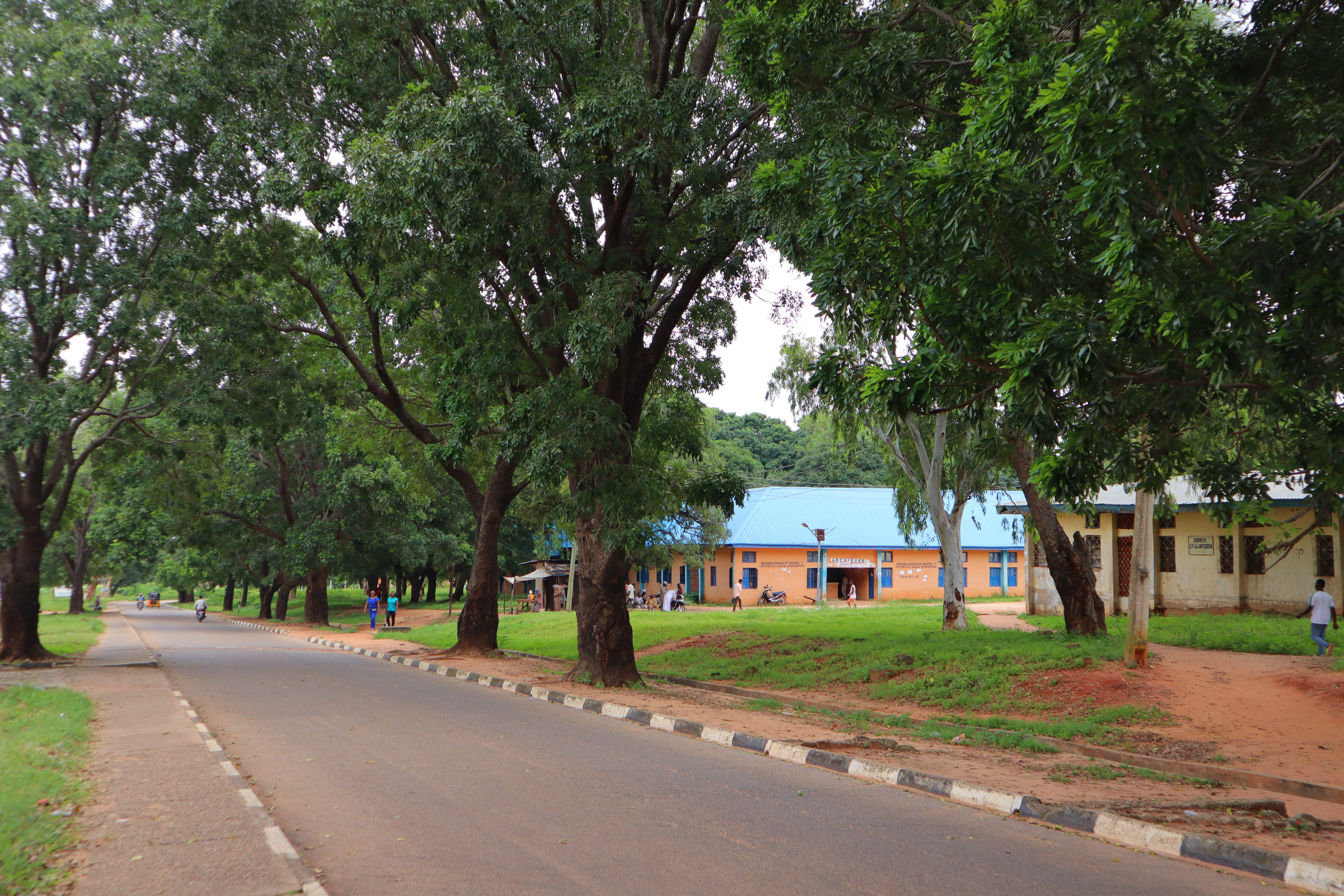
Polytechnic Campus grounds

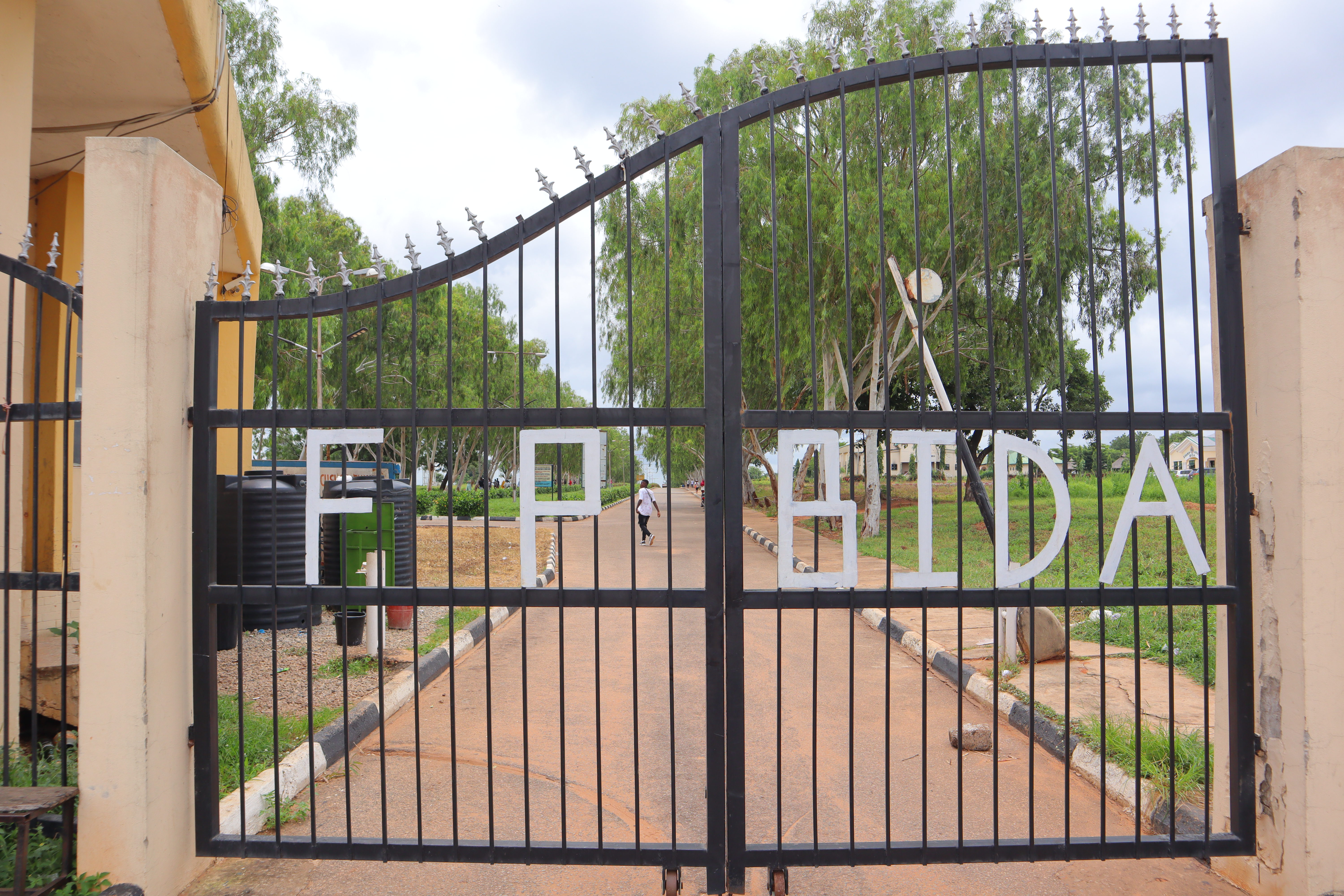
School gate

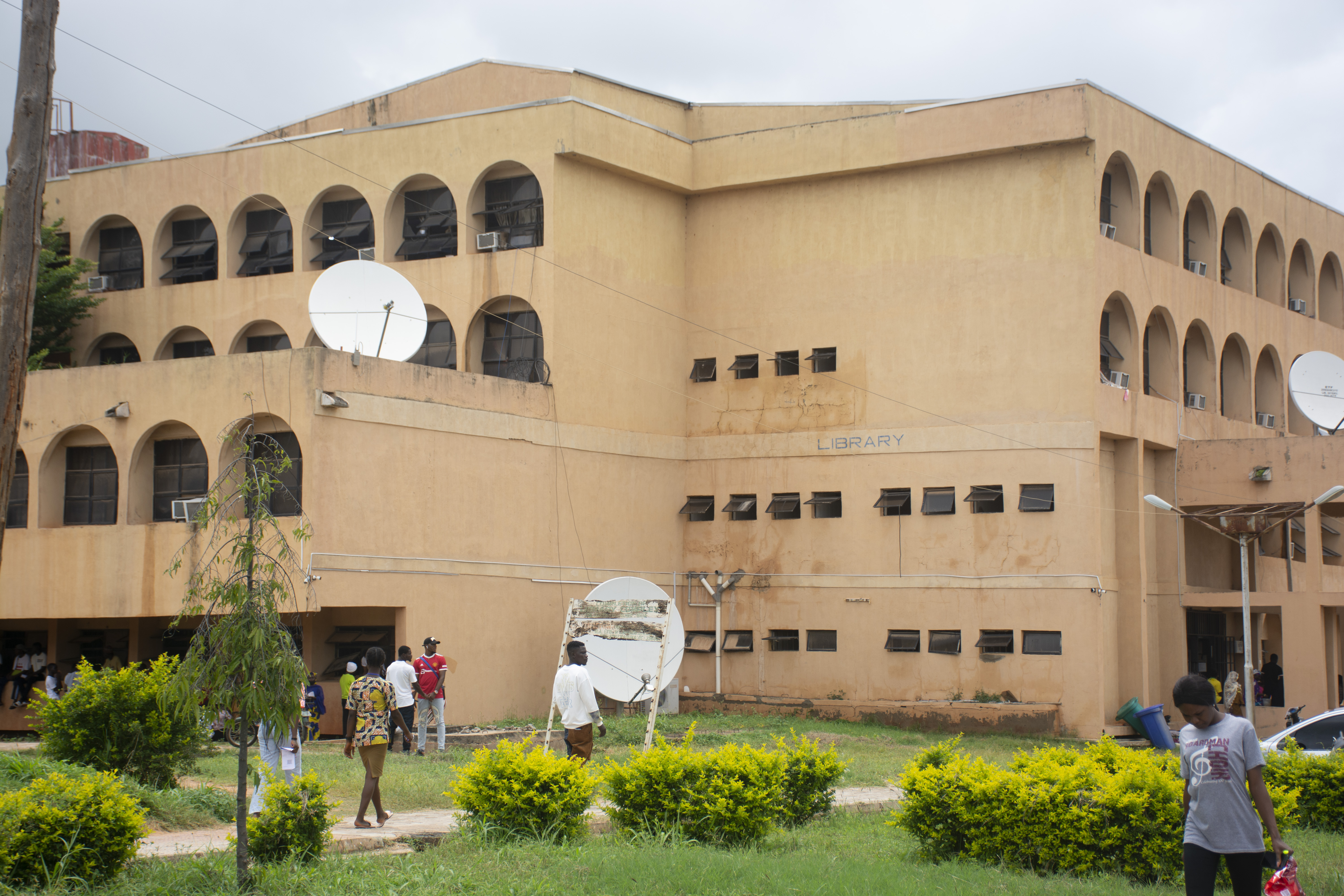
School library

== See also ==
- List of polytechnics in Nigeria
