= Yahaya Abubakar =

Etsu Nupe of Bida

Yahya Abubakar
- Etsu Nupe
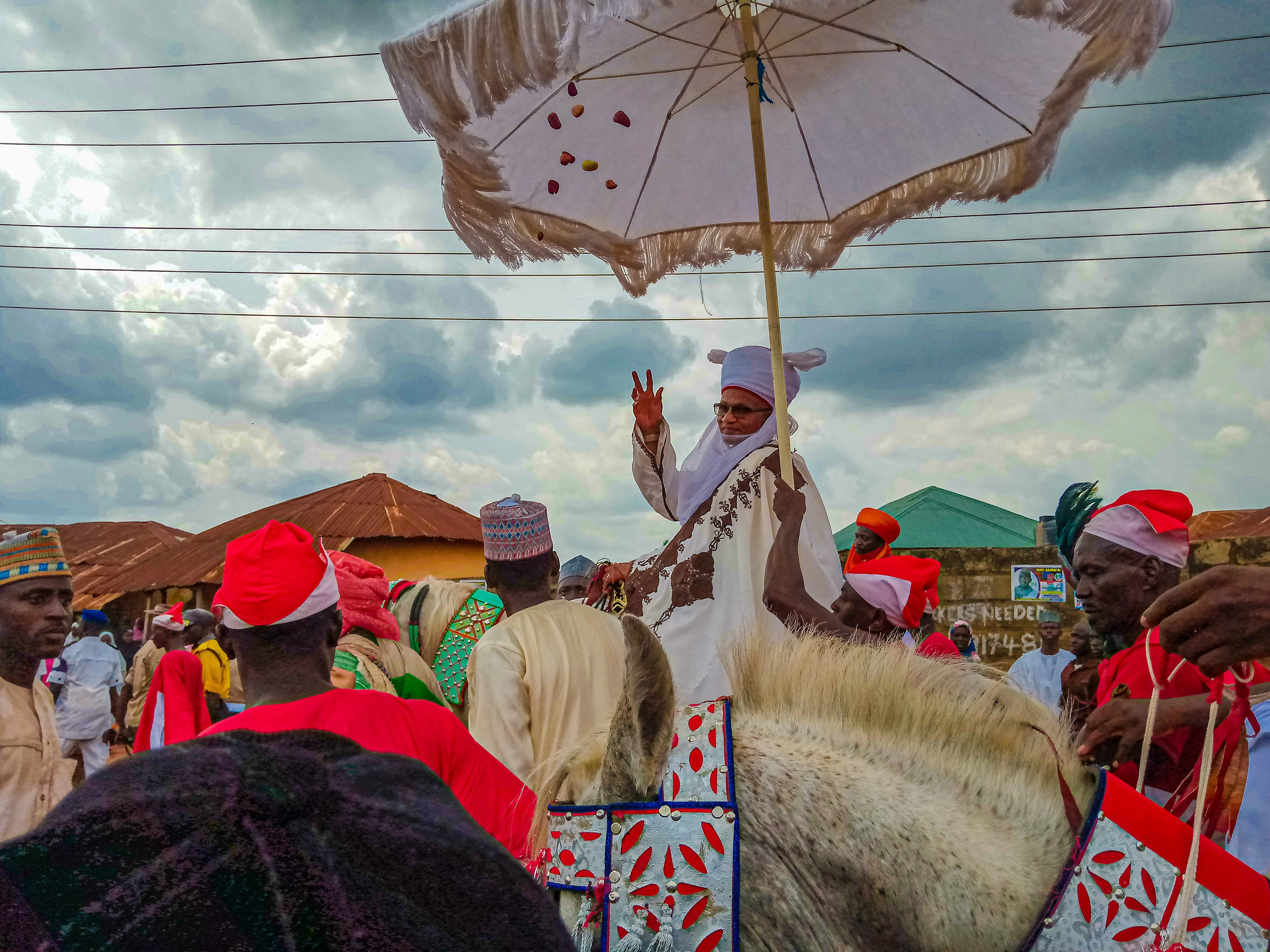
- Yahya Abubakar during the 2019 Durbar Festival

Etsu Nupe
- Reign: 2003
- Coronation: 20 August 2003
- Predecessor: Umaru Sanda Ndayako
- Born: Yahaya Abubakar; 12 September 1952 (age 74); Bida
- Spouse: Married to Four Wives
Names
- Yahaya Abubakar Sanganuwar Nakordi
- Royal: Usman Zaki Ruling house
- Father: Alh. Abubakar Saganuwa (Nakordi Nupe)
- Mother: Princess Haj. Habiba Bantigi Ndayako
- Religion: Islam
- Occupation: Ex-Military, Traditional Ruler

Brig. Gen. Yahaya Abubakar (Rtd) CFR is a first class traditional ruler (Emir or Amir) who has been the 12th Etsu Nupe, or King of the Nupe Kingdom of Nigeria, since 2003. His royal stool is situated in Bida, Niger State.

== Background ==
Yahaya was born on 12 September 1952 at Bida in Niger State and hails from one of the ruling houses of Bida Emirate (Usman Zaki). He attended Government College, Sokoto and later Commercial College, Kano (1967–1971), then enrolled into the Nigerian Defence Academy (1973–1975) in preparation for joining the Nigerian Army.

Before he was appointed the Etsu Nupe, he was the Kusodu Nupe. His last military posting was at the Nigerian Defense Headquarters Abuja, where he was a director of foreign operations, before retiring as a brigadier general in September 2003.

Yahaya Abubakar Kusodu Nupe was appointed the 13th Etsu Nupe on 11 September 2003, the ruler of all the Nupe speaking people around the world (Etsu Nupe: The King of Nupe) in succession to his late uncle Alhaji Umar Sanda Ndayako.

By this title, he is the Chairman of the Niger State Council of Traditional Rulers. He is the chairman, Coordinating Committee National Council of Traditional Rulers of Nigeria.

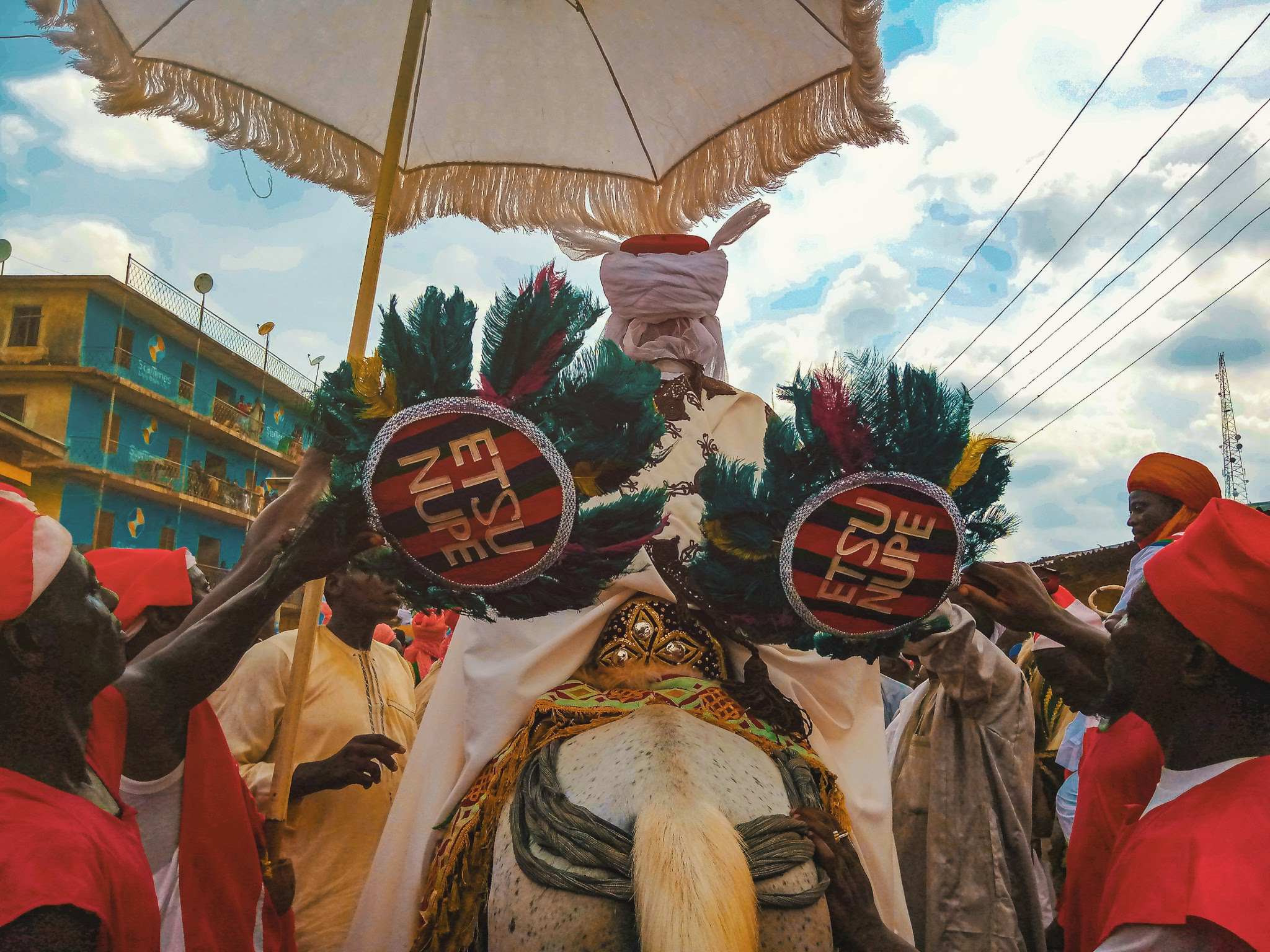
Etsu Nupe in durbar 2019

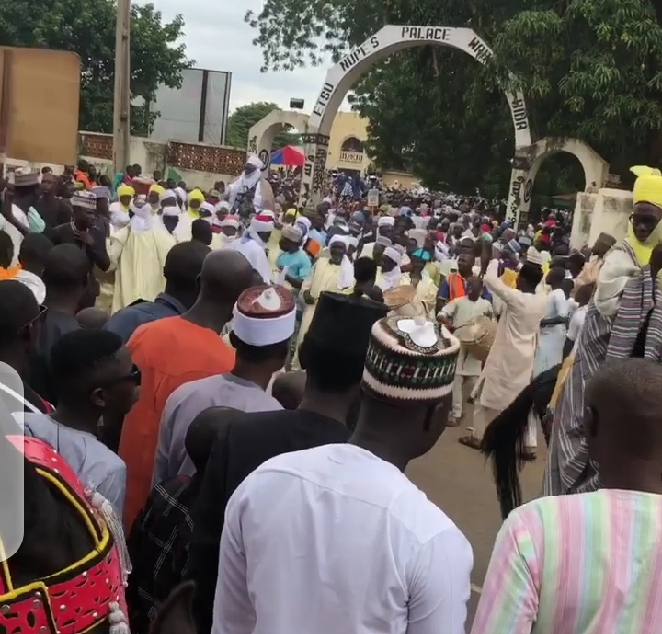
Etsu Nupe palace, wadata bida

== Other positions ==
The Emir chair the committee pushing for the creation of Edu State with headquarters at Bida out of the present Niger, Kogi and Kwara states to form a homeland for the Nupe people.

Other promoters for the creation of Edu State are Etsu Lapai, Etsu Agaie, Etsu Lafiyagi, Etsu Tsaragi, Etsu Patigi, Etsu Tsonga, prominent Nupe elder statesmen across the nation and abroad.

He chaired the committee management Board of the Abuja National Mosque.

Following a scandal when it was found that a Nupe man, Alhaji Muhammadu Bello Masaba, had married 86 wives, the Etsu Nupe set up a five-member committee of Islamic scholars to handle the issue. In September 2008 it was reported that Masaba has agreed to divorce all but four of the wives.
