= Bida Emirate =

- Traditional state
- Flag

- Location in Nigeria
- Coordinates: 9°05′N 6°01′E
- Country: Nigeria
- State: Niger State
- Established: 1835

Government
  - Etsu: Dr. Alh. (Brig Gen). Yahaya Abubakar

The Bida Emirate is a traditional state in Nigeria, a successor to the old Nupe Kingdom, with its headquarters in Bida, Niger State. The head of the emirate is the Etsu Nupe, who is the leader of the Nupe people.

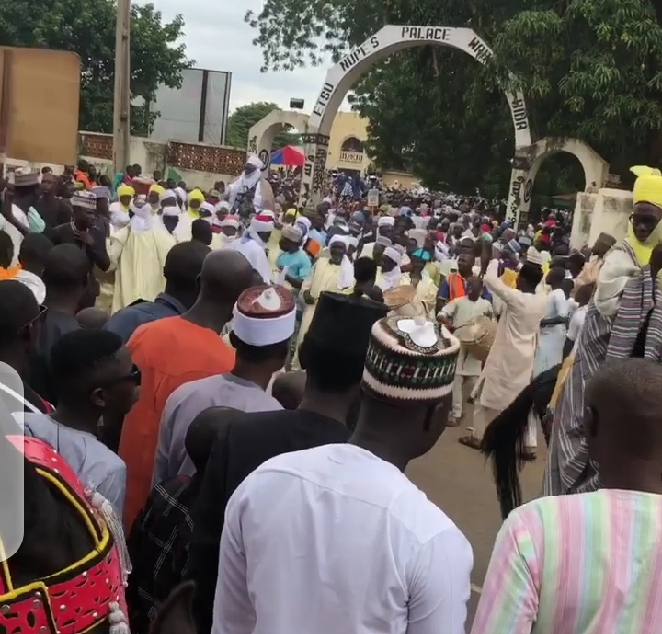
Etsu palace, wadate Bida

== History ==
The old Nupe Kingdom was established in the middle of the 15th century in a basin between the Niger and Kaduna rivers in what is now central Nigeria. Early history is mostly based on verbally-transmitted legends. King Jibiri, who reigned around 1770, was the first Nupe king to become Muslim. Etsu Ma’azu brought the kingdom to its period of greatest power, before dying in 1818. During that period, the Fulani were gaining power across Northern Nigeria. After Ma’azu's death and during the subsequent wars of succession, the Nupe Kingdom came under the control of the Gwandu Emirate. Masaba, son of the Fulani leader Mallam Dendo and a Nupe mother, gained power in 1841.

Faced with revolt by one of his generals, Masaba allied with the former Etsu Nupe, Usman Zaki, to recover control. Usman Zaki was enthroned as Etsu Nupe at Bida, and after his death around 1859 Masaba again became ruler until 1873. During his second period of rule, Masaba established the Bida Emirate as an important military power, steadily expanding its territory at the expense of its neighbors to the south and east. His successors retained control until 1897, when British Niger Company troops finally took Bida and established a puppet ruler. The Bida emirate became subject first to the British colonial regime, then to the independent state of Nigeria, with its rulers playing an increasingly ceremonial role.

Till today, the emirate celebrates its cultural day known as Nupe Cultural Day, for the remembrance of the defeat to British rulers in their region.

== Rulers ==
Rulers use the title "Etsu".

Names, dates and notes taken from John Stewart's African States and Rulers (1989).

Nupe Kingdom (1531-1835)

Name	Start	End	Notes
Tsoede	1531	1591	Founded the Kingdom of Nupe in 1531. Illegitimate son of Attah of Idah. Also known as Edegi or Choede.
Shaba	1591	1600	Also known as Tsoacha.
Zaulla	1600	1625	Also known as Zavunla or Zagulla.
Jiga	1625	1670	Also known as Jia or Jigba.
Mamman Wari	1670	1679	-
Abdu Waliyi	1679	1700	-
Aliyu	1700	1710	-
Ganamace	1710	1713	Also known as Sachi Gana Machi.
Ibrahima	1713	1717	-
Idrisu I	1717	1721	Also known as Ederisu.
Tsado	1721	1742	Also known as Chado or Abdullahi.
Abu Bakr Kolo	1742	1746	-
Jibrin	1746	1759	Also known as Jibrilu.
Ma'azu	1759	1767	-
Majiya I	1767	1777	Also known as Zubeiru.
Iliyasu	1777	1778	-
Ma'azu	1778	1795	Second reign.
Alikolo Tankari	1795	1795	-
Mamma	1795	1796	-
Jimada	1796	1805	In 1796 a civil war broke out between Jimada and Majiya II (grandsons of Iliyasu), which led to the Nupe Kingdom being temporarily split into West and East Nupe. Jimada ruled East Nupe until his death in 1805.
Majiya II	1796	1810	Ruled West Nupe until the death of Jimada in 1805, after which the Nupe Kingdom was reunited.
Idrisu II	1810	1830	-
Majiya II	1830	1834	Second reign.
Tsado	1834	1835	In 1835 Nupe became part of the Fulani Empire.

Nupe Emirate (1835-1901)

Name	Start	End	Notes
Usuman Zaki dan Malam Dendo	1835	1841	-
Masaba dan Malam Dendo	1841	1847	-
Umar Bahaushe	1847	1856	-
Usuman Zaki dan Malam Dendo	1856	1859	Second term.
Masaba dan Malam Dendo	1859	1873	Second term.
Umaru Majigi dan Muhamman Majigi	1873	1884	-
Maliki dan Usman Zaki	1884	1895	-
Abu Bakr dan Masaba	1884	1895	Died 1919.
Muhammadu dan Umaru Majigi	1895	1901	Nupe Emirate incorporated into the Northern Nigeria Protectorate in 1901.

Bida Emirate (1901-present)

Name	Start	End	Notes
Muhammadu dan Umaru Majigi	1901	February 1916	-
Bello dan Maliki	6 March 1916	1926	-
Malam Sa'idu dan Mamudu	1926	February 1935	-
Malam Muhammadu Ndayako dan Muhammadu	28 February 1935	29 October 1962	-
Usman Sarki dan Malam Sa'idu	29 October 1962	1969	Died 1984.
Malam Musa Bello	1969	10 January 1975	-
Umaru Sanda Ndayako	January 1975	1 September 2003	-
Yahaya Abubakar	1 September 2003		-
