= Bida =

LGA in Niger state

- LGA and city
- Interactive map of Bida
- North Central
- Coordinates: 9°05′N 6°01′E
- Country: Nigeria
- State: Niger State

Government
  - Local Government Chairman and the Head of the Local Government Council: Rt. Hon. Usman Mohammed Manko
  - Etsu: Yahaya Abubakar

Area
  - Total: 1,698 km^{2} (656 sq mi)

Population (2006 census)
  - Total: 266,008
  - Density: 156.7/km^{2} (405.7/sq mi)
- Time zone: UTC+1 (WAT)
- 3-digit postal code prefix: 912
- ISO 3166 code: NG.NI.BI

Bida is a Local Government Area in Niger State, Nigeria and a city on the A124 highway which occupies most of the area.

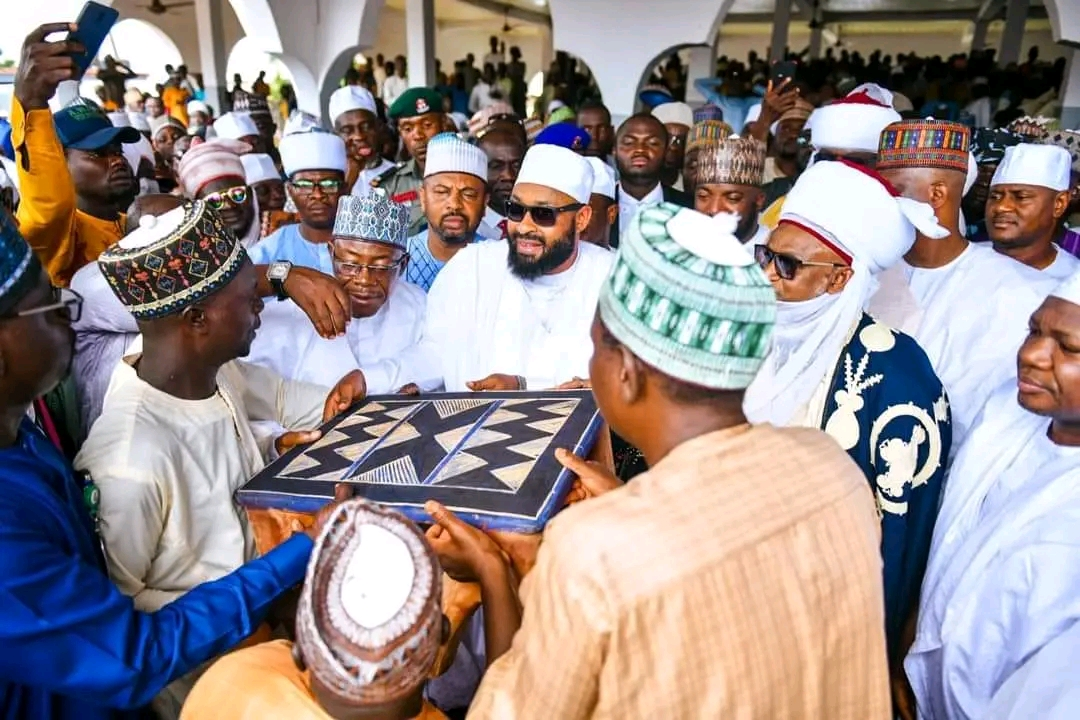
Festival in Bida, Niger State Nigeria

The LGA has an area of 51 km^{2} (20 sq mi) and a population of 188,181 at the 2006 census.

The postal code of the area is 912.

== Geography ==
Bida is the second largest city in Niger State with an estimated population of 178,840 (2007). It is located southwest of Minna, capital of Niger State, and is a dry, arid town. Bida has produced great men and women of substance who have positively had some great impact in the development of Nigeria.

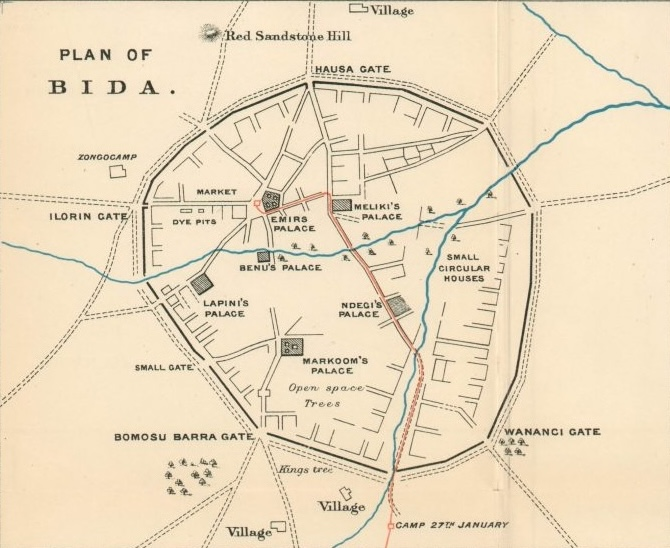
An 1897 plan of Bida city

It is the capital of Nupe kingdom that stretches from the tip of Gurara local government down to river Niger on Jebba North Axis.

Bida is listed by UNESCO as one of the cultural centers of the world as it housed the famous Masaga, Tswata Mukun, Dokodza bronze and brass industry till date. Bida is the only place in the world where the best groundnut crunchy cakes; popularly known as kuli- kuli is made.

Districts include Katcha, Enagi, Baddeggi, Agaie, Pategi, Lemu, Kutigi, and others.

There are other places in Bida such as Bamisu estate, Ramatu dangana, ECWA poly road, Small Market, Main Market and the Federal Medical Centre (Bida) others. There are also different schools like Federal Government Girls College Bida, Federal Polytechnic Staff Secondary School, New Solutions Comprehensive School, Egwafin College of Health Sciences, Edumana College of Health Science, Government College, Bida and other places of interest.

== Economy ==
As an agrarian society, Bida is the centre of all the commercial activities in the Niger South district of Niger state. It is where mostly all the cash crops such as shea nuts, cashew nut, groundnut and rice are exported inlarge quantities to the outside world. The town is the heart of Niger state has it is blessed with arable land for farming different grains and tuber crops. It is also a gate way town to Ways - suburban village where virtually all the states in the South eastern part of the country converge to engage in buying, selling an exportation of livestock within an outside the country.

== Climate ==
Temperatures rarely drop below 13 °C (56 °F) or rise over 38 °C (101 °F) in the humid, partly cloudy dry season, which has a hot and uncomfortable range of 17 °C (62 °F) to 35 °C (95 °F).

The hot season lasts for 2.7 months, from February 3 to April 23, with an average daily high temperature of over 34 °C (93 °F). The hottest month of the year in Bida is April, with an average high temperature of 34 °C (94 °F) and low temperature of 24 °C (76 °F).

With an average daily maximum temperature below 30 °C (86 °F), the chilly season lasts 3.3 months, from June 28 to October 7. With an average low of 18 °C (64 °F) and a high of 32 °C (90 °F), December is the coldest month of the year in Bida.

Climate data for Bida (1991–2020)
Month	Jan	Feb	Mar	Apr	May	Jun	Jul	Aug	Sep	Oct	Nov	Dec	Year
Record high °C (°F)	40 (104)	43 (109)	42 (108)	42 (108)	40 (104)	38 (100)	35 (95)	34 (93)	35 (95)	38 (100)	39 (102)	41 (106)	43.0 (109.4)
Mean daily maximum °C (°F)	35.3 (95.5)	37.7 (99.9)	38.5 (101.3)	37.3 (99.1)	34.2 (93.6)	32.0 (89.6)	30.8 (87.4)	30.3 (86.5)	31.0 (87.8)	32.9 (91.2)	35.5 (95.9)	35.4 (95.7)	34.2 (93.6)
Daily mean °C (°F)	28.3 (82.9)	30.9 (87.6)	32.5 (90.5)	31.7 (89.1)	29.4 (84.9)	27.7 (81.9)	27.0 (80.6)	26.6 (79.9)	26.9 (80.4)	27.9 (82.2)	28.7 (83.7)	28.0 (82.4)	28.8 (83.8)
Mean daily minimum °C (°F)	21.3 (70.3)	24.2 (75.6)	26.4 (79.5)	26.1 (79.0)	24.6 (76.3)	23.4 (74.1)	23.2 (73.8)	23.0 (73.4)	22.7 (72.9)	23.0 (73.4)	22.0 (71.6)	20.6 (69.1)	23.4 (74.1)
Record low °C (°F)	15 (59)	17 (63)	21 (70)	15.8 (60.4)	16 (61)	16.4 (61.5)	14 (57)	17 (63)	19 (66)	16.8 (62.2)	17 (63)	16 (61)	14.0 (57.2)
Average precipitation mm (inches)	0.1 (0.00)	2.4 (0.09)	7.7 (0.30)	48.7 (1.92)	158.5 (6.24)	180.4 (7.10)	218.0 (8.58)	227.8 (8.97)	214.8 (8.46)	90.7 (3.57)	2.7 (0.11)	0.1 (0.00)	1,151.9 (45.35)
Average precipitation days (≥ 1.0 mm)	0.0	0.2	0.9	3.7	9.4	10.3	13.0	12.5	12.4	6.9	0.2	0.0	69.5
Average relative humidity (%)	47.9	45.3	52.7	67.6	79.0	83.4	85.6	86.9	85.6	81.2	64.8	54.8	69.6
Source: NOAA

== Demographics ==
The major ethnic group is the Nupe. Bida is the headquarters of the Nupe Kingdom led by the Etsu Nupe (presently Etsu Yahaya Abubakar). The leadership style of the ancient town of Bida is emirship, and the head of the town is addressed as Etsu Nupe. Other tribes include Igbo, Yoruba, Hausa, Igala and Gbagi, Ibira.

== See also ==
- Federal Medical Centre (Bida)
- Federal Polytechnic Bida
