= Dadasare Abdullahi =

Nigerian writer, nurse, journalist and women's educator (1918–1984)

Hajiya Dadasare Abdullahi MON
- Born: Maimunatu Abdullahi; 1918; Gola, Colonial Nigeria (in present-day Adamawa state, Nigeria)
- Died: August 1984 (aged 65–66); Jimeta, Gongola State, Nigeria
- Other name: Dada Sare East; Mama Hajiya
- Occupations: writer, journalist, nurse, adult educator
- Notable work: It Can Now be Told (2019)
- Partner: Rupert East (1939–1951)

Hajiya Maimunatu Dadasare Abdullahi MON (1918 – August 1984) was a Nigerian writer, nurse, journalist and adult educator. She was the first female journalist in Northern Nigeria and a pioneering figure in women's education in the region.

As a child, Dadasare was abducted by a British colonial officer and forced into concubinage. Her life as his informal "wife" gave her access to colonial social circles, an experience that profoundly shaped her early life and worldview. After escaping the traumatic situation, she entered a long and formative relationship with the colonial education officer Rupert East, whom she affectionately called Jaumusare (master of the house). While with East in Zaria, she made notable contributions to his work, particularly in the development of Hausa literacy and publishing through the Literature Bureau, and received a literacy education in Hausa and English that gave her access to the city's male-dominated intellectual arena. Through her work at the Gaskiya Corporation, she became the first woman to work as a journalist in Northern Nigeria. Dadasare was an influential but often anonymous contributor to Gaskiya Ta Fi Kwabo, with her articles focusing on social and political issues, and also established the women's page of Jakadiya, the first Hausa-language newspaper for women, where she wrote biographical articles on prominent women such as Elizabeth Fry and Florence Nightingale, as well as pieces on relatable Victorian "feminine" topics, including hygiene and childcare.

From the mid-1950s, Dadasare emerged as a leading figure in adult and women's education in Northern Nigeria, designing and implementing large-scale programmes that gave instruction in literacy, hygiene, and childcare to thousands of women, especially those living in purdah. As Assistant Superintendent of Adult Education, she built a region-wide network of female teachers and produced innovative teaching materials that gained international recognition. She was also a trained nurse and health visitor in Nigeria and Britain and volunteered extensively in hospitals.

Scholars use Dadasare's life to explore colonial trauma, with a focus on how subalterns negotiated the brutal realities of overwhelming colonial violence while engaging with colonial networks. Moses Ochonu has examined her intimate relationship with Rupert East as an example of how colonised individuals could form affectionate connections within oppressive structures and navigate, and sometimes, leverage colonial power.

== Life ==
=== Early childhood ===
Maimunatu Abdullahi was born in 1918 in the Gola District of the Adamawa Province in colonial Nigeria. Most of the townspeople of Gola were her relatives; both her father Dewa Abdullahi and her mother Inna Demmo were related to the district head. She came from a fairly privileged Fulani family that was largely involved in cattle-rearing.

Abdullahi was the fifth of seven children, with three brothers and three sisters. By her late childhood, most of her siblings had died. The loss of so many children seriously affected her father's health, and he eventually died, "almost certainly of a broken heart," according to Abdullahi. In her autobiography, It Can Now Be Told, Abdullahi later noted that this series of deaths in her family could have been avoided had they had access to adequate medical services. She wrote that the tragedy "created in me subconsciously an awareness of the need of the people, especially of women, for help and education," and that it "founded in me a desire to do something about it."

Despite this, Abdullahi recalled her early childhood fondly, describing it as "happy and uneventful." She dedicated the first chapter of her autobiography to her time in Gola, recalling songs and games as well as lessons she received from her family. She noted "I owe so much to the guiding, sustaining influence of the home. My parents were wise, loving and gentle […] The foundations laid for me in early childhood have stood firm during the psychological earthquakes of grief and shock."

=== Abduction ===
Shortly after her husband's death, Abdullahi's mother took her remaining children, all daughters, to the nearby town of Jambutu, which was largely inhabited by his relatives. In Jambutu, Abdullahi's mother reluctantly married her deceased husband's brother in order to ensure better support for her children. In 1929, Abdullahi accompanied her aunt on a visit to relatives in Gola. During this trip, she was abducted by two horsemen on the orders of a British Administrative officer and taken to the town of Pella (in present-day Hong, Adamawa State). Abdullahi was eleven years old at the time. She later learned that the abduction had been orchestrated through an elaborate plan by one of her cousins, who "wished to stand well with this bature (white man)." The unnamed colonial official, who was feared by the local population, was nicknamed Maisikeli ("the man with the scale"). He had an English wife and children in Britain and was seeking a young Fulani girl to serve as his "unofficial wife." A group of kidnapped pubescent Fulani girls was paraded before him, from which he selected Abdullahi.

Abdullahi was placed under the watch of Siddiki, a member of her abductor's colonial staff, who was to follow her wherever she went and prevent her escape. Upon learning of her abduction and forced appropriation, her family in Jambutu were enraged. They armed themselves and began preparations to invade Gola to rescue her, but other clan members convinced them to stand down. Instead, they advised that the matter be taken to the colonial authorities at the provincial headquarters in Yola. An inquiry was then launched by the Yola officials, during which information was gathered from multiple sources. In the end, the colonial authorities asked Abdullahi whether she wished to return to her mother or remain with her abductor. She was asked three times (according to local custom), and on each occasion stated her "earnest wish to return to my mother." Her wishes were ignored, and she was forced to remain with her abductor.

Realising she was stuck with her abductor, Abdullahi resolved to escape as soon as the opportunity presented its self. This came while they were encamped at Sigire. While her abductor, along with his African servants and policemen, were taking their midday nap, Abdullahi fled towards the Gola Hills, which were visible from the camp. Her escape was discovered around sunset, and a search party was dispatched on horseback to recapture her. She spent the night in the cold, wet bush while attempting to make her way toward Jambutu. Upon reaching the town, however, no one was willing to assist her, fearing reprisals from her abductor. Hungry and exhausted, she hid in the bushes between Gola and Jambutu until she was discovered by colonial policemen and returned to her abductor. On her return, he beat her, later recalling that he "slapped me hard." Suspecting that Abdullahi's family had assisted her attempted escape, her abductor stripped her uncle of his chieftaincy as district head of Gola. Several relatives later fled the district, fearing further reprisals and were "afraid that [their] daughters might suffer a fate similar to mine."

=== Move to Benue ===
Abdullahi's abductor was later transferred to Ibbi in the Benue Province. He took her with him, a move that caused her considerable anxiety, as she was now much farther from her family and friends. In Ibbi, as her abductor's informal "wife", she socialised with colonial officials and their wives. One of these officials was Rupert East, who was eager to learn Fulfulde. Considering him "very attractive", Abdullahi became particularly close to East. She taught him her mother tongue, while he in turn "aroused" in her a "strong interest in Western music.

Meanwhile, Abdullahi was impregnated by her abductor. Shortly after she gave birth to a son, his term of service ended, and he was asked to retire and return to England. He told Abdullahi that he was merely going on leave and would soon be back. He arranged for her to travel back to her mother in Gola, instructing her to remain there until his return. During the difficult journey on the Benue River back to Adamawa, she lost her son to malaria. She recounts her journey as thus:

I spent the night at a small place called Bajabure. Mosquitoes swarmed everywhere. My baby was badly bitten all through the night. He quickly got malaria, and as he was not very strong and I could not get to a doctor, he died in my arms at Song on the way to Gola. I shall not dwell on this event. Only a mother can know how I felt.

Shortly after her return to Gola, Abdullahi's kinsmen, unwilling to allow her to return to her abductor, proposed that she marry a local man. The prospect, she later wrote, "filled me with gloom." She further wrote that she was no longer the "child who had been unscrupulously carried off," noting that "something […] had fundamentally changed and my horizon had widened." So when she received a message in 1933 from Rupert East inviting her to join him in Zaria, she accepted eagerly. She secured a chaperone, an escort, and a horse from the district head of Gola for the journey to Zaria, around five hundred miles away. While en route, she received a message from the district head ordering her to back to Gola to be married. Instead, she sent her assigned escort away, "engaged a new horseboy," and continued on to Zaria.

=== Relationship with Rupert East ===
Abdullahi described her time with East in Zaria as "happy days". She affectionately called him Jaumu-sare ("Master of the House" in Fulfulde), while he called her Dadasare ("Mother of the House"), a name she later adopted. Other sobriquets she used for him included Maigida (the Hausa equivalent of Jaumu-sare) and Giɗaɗo ("Beloved"). In her memoir, Dadasare explained her apparently paradoxical decision to rejoin the colonial network and move in with East:

This time I did not have to be kidnapped. I had decided of my own free will to go to a man I felt I could love and who, I was sure, had real feeling for me. I do not propose, now or later, to expatiate on the personal relationship that grew up between Jaumu-sare and myself. Those who have deeply loved will not need to be told, and those who have not, could never understand.

During this period, East was serving as an education officer and as the inaugural director of the Translation Bureau in Zaria, which later became the Literature Bureau, which was the mass literacy and literary publishing division of the Northern Nigerian colonial administration. At Zaria, Dadasare encountered East's intellectual and literary world, which she initially found "a mystery". He soon arranged for her to be taught how to read and write using the Roman alphabet. She began learning Hausa in Roman script and quickly progressed, later recalling that she read Hausa books faster than East could obtain them. Because of the scarcity of Romanised Hausa texts at the time, she read the Hausa translation of the Bible three times, despite being Muslim. Noting this, East arranged for her to learn English, assuring her that once she learnt the language "it would be impossible for me to run out of books." She soon got attached to English fiction, becoming particularly fond of Jane Austen and developing a passion for detective novels. She also began keeping a diary, a practice she maintained for the rest of her life. As East's informal wife, Dadasare managed his household, including supervising his African servants, and hosted parties and dinners for his European friends, as expected of a colonial spouse. East insisted that she be accepted and treated as his wife, a stance that displeased a number of his British colonial colleagues and friends. In later years, when she entered government service, she used the name "Mrs. Dada Sare East." H P Elliott, a friend of East and a member of his colonial social circle, recalled: "He lived with a delightful Fulani woman, Dada Sare, who though not formally married to him was treated by him as his wife and was the hostess in their home." Elliott also later recounts,

I was still finding my feet in this exacting job when a message reached me one day urgently to call and see Dada Sare. I found her in tears. 'I am sure something dreadful has happened to my husband', she said. I did my best to calm and comfort her, but was disbelieving. Rupert was on his way home via the Sudan and Egypt with a DO [District officer] friend. We learnt some days later that the DO had been killed and Rupert seriously injured in a train crash on the railway between Cairo and Tel Aviv. Dada Sare was right. It was a 'psychic' sensing—the only one of its kind I encountered in Nigeria. She was a remarkable woman who became later an Education Officer and died, greatly respected, recently in her native Adamawa Province.

In 1951, East retired from colonial service and returned to England with his new wife Jacqueline de Naeyer, a Belgian artist who had worked for the Gaskiya Corporation. Dadasare maintained close relations with East and his new family, including his two children, with whom she later recalled having a "wonderful relationship". She made several visits to their home in Wiltshire during her holidays in Britain. In her memoir, Dadasare described her relationship with East in later years up to his death in 1975:

But all the time whether I was with him or alone I had encouragement and help from Jaumusare. In later years, partly perhaps because of the great disparity in our ages, I came to look on him as a father rather than a husband [...] Always, the deep bond between us remained, right up to the time of his death in 1975. Indeed it continues right up to this very moment, not only in my memory but also in me myself for I am and will always be the person that he made me.

When he died, East left "some substantial amount of money" to Dadasare in his will. The funds were later paid to her adopted daughter, Aishatu Dikko.

=== Journalist at Gaskiya Corporation ===
As head of the Literature Bureau, East transformed it from a simple bureaucratic organ into one invested in supporting reading and writing without insisting that these activities be explicitly tied to colonial priorities. He took a strong interest in the cultures and societies of Northern Nigeria and toured the region collecting examples of imaginative writing, many of which were later published as some of the earliest novellas aimed at a growing readership of Romanised Hausa readers.

In January 1939, the Literature Bureau published its first issue of Gaskiya Ta Fi Kwabo, the first newspaper entirely written in the Hausa language. The paper soon became highly popular in Northern Nigeria, particularly among Western-educated men. Dadasare was an engaged reader of the paper and frequently wrote anonymous letters to the Hausa editor, Abubakar Imam, on social and political issues. Writing under pseudonyms, she also wrote opinion editorials that raised matters of local concern. On one occasion she "complained bitterly" about the absence of clinics in Zaria or its densely populated suburb of Tudun Wada. Her article reportedly angered colonial authorities, who unsuccessfully attempted to identify its author. After some delay, clinics were established in both Zaria and Tudun Wada. Dadasare was later employed by the Literature Bureau as an editor. Among her responsibilities was reviewing the large volume of letters sent to the chief editor by readers across Northern Nigeria and selecting those suitable for publication. She also replied to many of these letters, some of which took on the character of debate and disputation on a variety of contemporary social and political topics. She noted that "readers certainly did not hesitate to express their feelings" on these matters.

At East's urging, the colonial government established the Gaskiya Corporation in 1945. The corporation was conceived as a community of Europeans and Nigerians aimed at further developing literature for local audiences through its publishing arm. In 1946, the Gaskiya Corporation launched Jakadiya (lit. "The Female Messenger"), a newspaper targeted at women. The paper's popularity grew rapidly, largely because it expanded beyond its intended readership. Many women who could not read the Roman script had the newspaper read aloud to them by literate husbands or acquaintances, while public readings were also organised in villages by those familiar with the script. Another reason for its success was the women's page, established and edited by Dadasare. Writing under her real name, she filled the section with biographical articles on prominent women such as Elizabeth Fry and Florence Nightingale, as well as pieces on relatable Victorian "feminine" topics, including hygiene and childcare.

Through her work on both Gaskiya and Jakadiya, Dadasare developed skills that later proved valuable during her leadership of region-wide adult education campaigns, particularly in producing pamphlets and posters for Northern Nigerian audiences. Her position also granted her access to the predominantly male intellectual circles that emerged among the region's Western-educated elite. Among the leading intellectuals of the period were two of her colleagues at Gaskiya, Abubakar Imam and Nuhu Bamalli, both of whom she later acknowledged for their "kindly help and wise advice" during her time at the corporation.

=== Nursing career ===
In the mid-1940s, Dadasare began volunteering at the Church Missionary Society Mission Hospital in Wusasa, near Zaria, where she began formally training to become a nurse. As a Muslim woman, she was able to provide care to Muslim women in purdah, particularly in medical matters requiring a high degree of discretion. Dadasare later recalled that she "loved nursing" at the mission hospital.

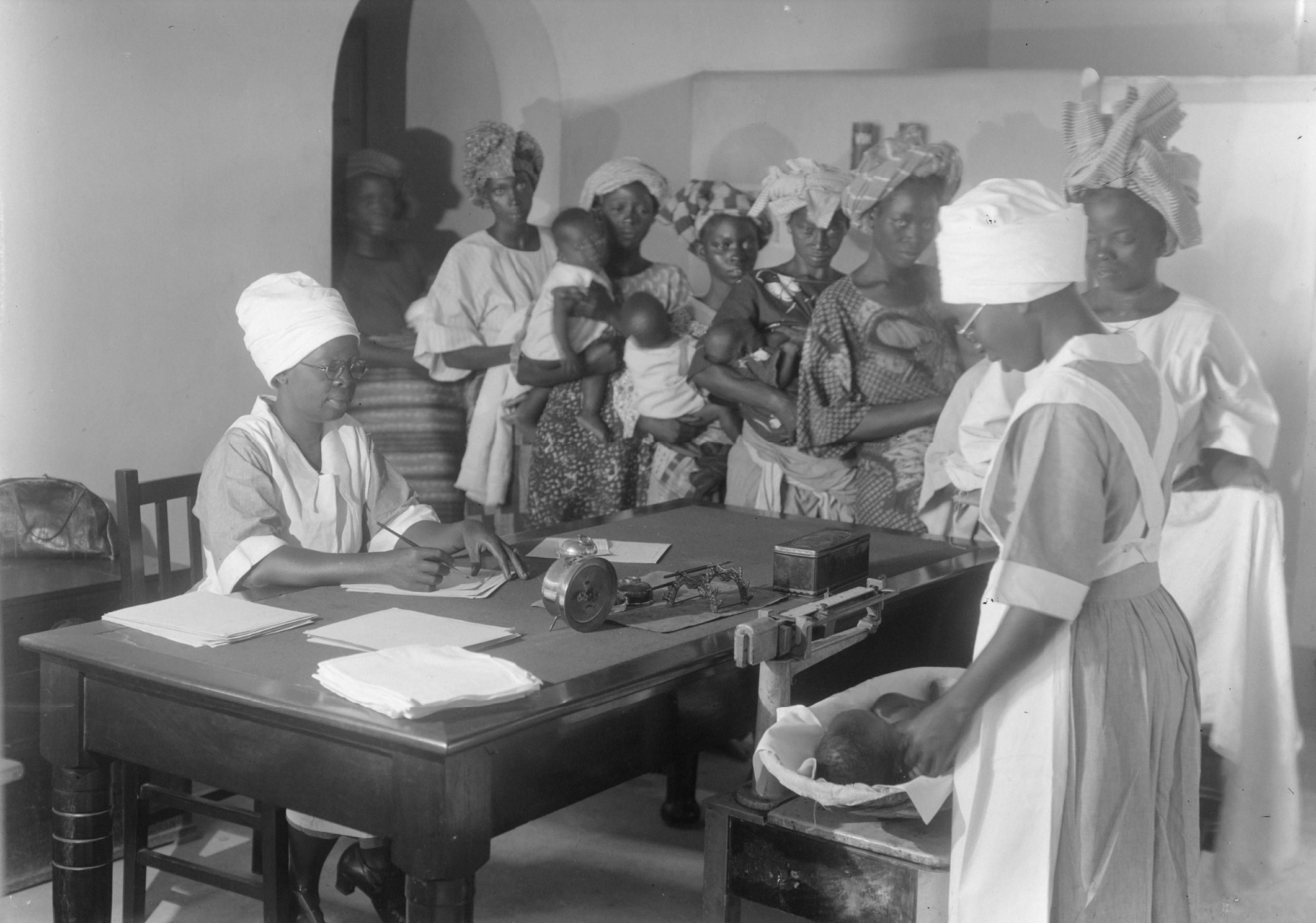
Mothers wait in line at a child clinic centre in colonial Lagos

In 1949, she travelled to England to further her training. She initially stayed in Oxford at the home of Mr and Mrs Akers and enrolled in a Health Visitors course run by the county council. In December 1949, she began clinical training at Horton General Hospital in Banbury, where she worked until 1952. She then transferred to Townlands Hospital in Henley-on-Thames, before moving six months later to London, where she continued her training at Plaistow Maternity Hospital until 1955. She spent the remainder of that year at Cirencester Nursing Home, where she began Part II of her midwifery training. Her studies were cut short, however, after she received what she later described as "disturbing family news."

Dadasare sailed back to Nigeria in early 1956. During her absence, Rupert East had retired from colonial service and returned to England. Before leaving Zaria, he had arranged for her personal belongings to be stored until her return. Instead, she found that they had been lost, likely stolen and sold. Despite this setback, she remained determined to continue her nursing career. Although her training had been incomplete, it qualified her for recognition as a State Enrolled Nurse and as a health visitor.

=== Adult women's education campaign ===
Before she could resume her nursing career in Nigeria, Dadasare was summoned by the North's Chief Adult Education Officer Ahmadu Coomassie, who was planning to set up a special section for Adult Education for women. Coomassie was seeking a woman who had "experience in working with male colleagues and who could deal with men generally" and felt Dadasare was an ideal candidate. When she objected that her training was in nursing not in education, he replied that it did not matter as she could "instruct women in hygiene, childcare and homecraft as well as reading and writing." Convinced that he had made "a valid point," Dadasare accepted the appointment as Assistant Superintendent of Adult Education in the Northern Ministry of Education.

After completing a short teaching course, Dadasare was sent to the Sudan United Mission Training Centre at Gindiri in the Plateau Province to study its methods of women's education. While there, she also volunteered in the mission's maternity and children's wards. Four years later in 1960, she attended the International Women's Conference at Ibadan University, where she met advocates for women's education from around the world, including prominent Nigerian figures such as Kofoworola Ademola and Adetowun Ogunsheye. From late 1961 to July 1962, Dadasare had further training in England at the Institute of Education, University of London, studying adult education and community development under T R Batten, whom she later described as "an inspiring and lovable leader and a stimulating teacher." During this period, she also visited several social and educational agencies and women's organisations. At the end of Batten's course, participants entered an essay competition on "Leadership", in which Dadasare emerged as one of the winners. The successful participants were sponsored on a summer trip to the United States. During the eight week visit, Dadasare attended a course at Columbia University in New York on psychology and leadership and briefly studied home economics at the University of Michigan. She also visited several other locations, including Connecticut, Washington, and the United Nations headquarters in New York.

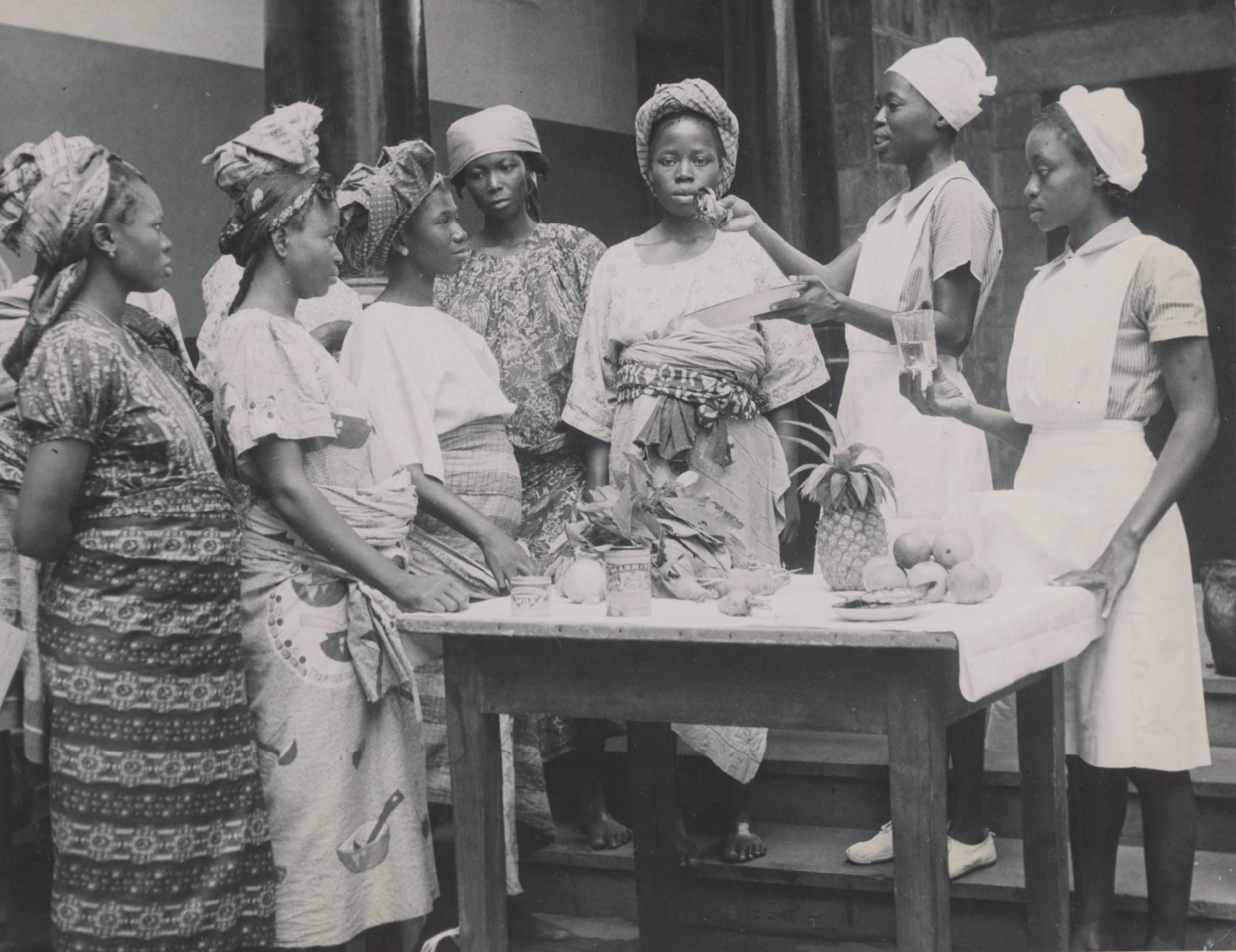
Midwife demonstrates proper diet to a group of women at the Massey street Maternity Hospital in colonial Lagos

Dadasare later wrote that they enabled her "to adapt what I had learnt to the specific needs of our women in Northern Nigeria." She formally entered government service in 1956 as Assistant Superintendent of Adult Education and was based in the Women's Section at the Field Headquarters in Zaria. At the time, women's education in Northern Nigeria was severely underdeveloped. In 1951, there were only 108 girls enrolled in middle schools, and by 1954 the region had just 219 girls in secondary school classes. Many of these students were married immediately upon completing their education. Another major hindrance to women's education was the widespread practice of purdah or female seclusion, particularly among the region's Muslim population. In the years leading up to Nigeria's planned independence in 1960, the Northern Regional Government sought to address these challenges through expanded adult and women's education initiatives.

Dadasare proposed solutions to tackling these issues was rapidly educating large numbers of women and convincing men of "two things, first that it was an advantage to have an educated wife and secondly that it was not only the women's right but also to the benefit of the community, that she should be able to go out and take a job." She further explained that at the time, she was convinced that "in our Yaki Da Jahilci, our 'War Against Ignorance', we must begin with the women in purdah." As early as 1956, Dadasare began experimenting with small private classes that included both purdah and non-purdah women. In these sessions, she taught childcare, hygiene, and later cooking, often at the urging of the women's husbands. Finding the experiment successful, she sought and obtained official government approval to establish evening classes specifically for women in purdah.

Once approval was granted, Dadasare began recruiting teachers. Interest was so high that she was forced to turn away several applicants due to departmental regulations. The first classes were organised in the residence of politician Ladan Baki Othman. The curriculum covered hygiene, childcare, cooking, reading and writing, and simple knitting. Instruction emphasised practical skills rather than theory, with time allocated for discussion and questions. An informal atmosphere was intentionally fostered to encourage participation. The initial successes of the classes and the problem of understaffing pushed for a "crash" course manner of staff training to keep with the rapidly expanding programme. Between 1956 and 1963, Margaret Burness worked alongside Dadasare. In her memoirs, Burness described Dadasare as "a wonderful colleague." Together, they toured six of the twelve provinces of Northern Nigeria by road, travelling each dry season to establish training courses for women instructors.

Dadasare was also closely involved in producing customised posters and pamphlets for use as teaching aids. She collaborated with Mallam Sarki Birnin Kebbi, an artist from the Visual Aids Section of the Adult Education Division in Zaria. The materials they produced were designed to be easily understood and depicted the everyday environments and practices of their intended audience. Their work attracted some attention, and they were later approached by the Food and Agriculture Organisation of the United Nations, which requested samples for use in studies aimed at improving adult education in other developing countries. Some of these methods were subsequently adapted for use in South America.

In late 1962, Dadasare secured funding from the Ford Foundation to establish a residential staff training centre in Zaria. Although she later noted that the budget was inadequate, the team succeeded in creating what she described as "an efficient" training centre. Between 1964 and 1966, more than three thousand women completed courses offered at the centre. According to figures she provided, the programme employed 13 supervisors, 200 organisers, and 3,000 instructresses, and ran experimental classes involving 20 women. She also recorded that the centre produced over 10,000 posters, which were sent to various parts of the world, including Togoland, Egypt, East Africa, and the United States.

=== Religion ===
During her time volunteering as a nurse at the Church Missionary Society Mission Hospital in Wusasa, Dadasare converted to Christianity. She later attributed this decision to her close work with the Wusasa missionaries and to the care with which they attended to patients. Her admiration for Rupert East also played a huge role, although she noted that "he was very much against it on the ground that it would cut me away from my people and culture."

She reverted to Islam in 1956 on her return from nursing training in England. In 1961, she completed the Hajj pilgrimage, which she described as "wonderful and inspiring".

=== Later life ===
In early 1966, Dadasare was conferred with the national honour of Member of the Order of the Niger by the Federal Government of Nigeria. Later that year, the First Republic came to an end, followed by a civil war and successive military governments, which lasted until 1979. During this turbulent period, the country underwent widespread restructuring, including the division of regions into states, each with its own administration. Consequently, in 1970, the Zaria training centre for women's education was shut down by the North-Western State government and the building was converted into a dormitory for a Teacher Training College for men.

Soon after, Dadasare took on a role as assistant and liaison officer for a research project led by Professor Eldryd Parry at Ahmadu Bello University, Zaria. The project aimed to "investigate the causes and incidence of heart failure in women after childbirth." She worked alongside Professor Parry for two years until the project was completed, after which she continued her volunteer work at the Ahmadu Bello University Teaching Hospital.

Dadasare was active in community and humanitarian organisations, including the Red Cross Society and the Society for Handicapped Children, and was a founding member of the Northern Nigerian Women's Association. She also participated in the Feed The Nation programme under the Muhammed-Obasanjo military government.

In the weeks preceding his death, Dadasare recorded in her diary frequent dreams of Rupert East dying in a sickbed. Her entry for 3 June 1975, the day he died, reads:

Dr. East, O.B.E., M.A., D.Lit., died today at 6:0pm. Jack rang and told me, but I have dreamt already he was dying. I saw it all, I was just waiting for confirmation. I just went numb. All what am able to remember was Maigida died today at 6:0pm. It was by 7:0p she rang up. I just put the phone down. I went walking like mad.

Later that same year, Dadasare completed her autobiography titled It Can Now Be Told, which was posthumously published in 2019. In 1977, she permanently returned to Gola, where she became a respected elder. She never married and had no biological children, though she adopted and raised several younger relatives.

== Death ==
Not much is known about Dadasare's activities between her return to Gola in 1977 and her death in August 1984. In the days preceding her death, she phoned her adopted daughter, Aishatu Dikko, who lived in Daura, and requested that she travel to Gombi, a town near Gola. Dikko agreed to make the journey by car the following day. Dadasare reportedly told her, "If you come and do not meet me, look under my pillow, I'm going to leave a message for you there." When Dikko asked for clarification, Dadasare gave no further explanation. She also informed Mallam Tukur Yola, a young man living in her household as domestic help, "From tomorrow you will see me no more."

The following morning, Mallam Yola went to the house to water the flowers as part of his routine. Upon approaching the well, he noticed a kettle, a prayer mat, a torchlight and a pair of slippers. Using the torchlight to peer into the well, he discovered that Dadasare had jumped in, apparently attempting to end her life. He quickly alerted relatives and neighbours, and she was pulled from the well and taken to a hospital in Jimeta.

When Dikko arrived three days later, she found the house packed with mourners. She learned that Dadasare had died shortly after observing the Asr prayers, just outside the hospital ward. At the house, Dikko discovered two letters under her mother's pillow. The first letter contained instructions for the distribution of Dadasare's wealth. Regarding the second letter, Dadasare's biographer, Dr Aliyah Adamu Ahmad, recounted:

When I asked Dikko about the content of the second letter, she started crying. I was advised by my husband not to press the matter further and that I should wait until our next meeting. I returned to Sokoto wondering what that other letter contained. A suicide note perhaps, I thought. Dikko herself died before our next meeting, so I have not been able to get to the root of that unfortunate episode.

== It Can Now Be Told ==
Dadasare completed her autobiography in 1975, the same year Rupert East died. She initially wrote it under the supervision of William Rankin, a former colonial officer in Nigeria, and titled it It Can Now Be Told. At the urging of her adopted daughter, Aishatu Dikko, the title was changed to Mama Hajiya, the name by which her relatives in Gola knew her. For decades, the manuscript remained unpublished. She had reportedly given it to her former colleague at the Gaskiya Corporation, Nuhu Bamalli, for publication but the manuscript somehow went missing.

During her PhD research on Rupert East at Bayero University Kano, Aliyah Adamu Ahmad became interested in Dadasare, noting that "much of the colonial record on Dr East also involved that of Dadasare." She set out to gather information for a future biography and discovered the existence of the unpublished manuscript through Aishatu Dikko. Ahmad attempted to locate the lost manuscript, including consulting the late Nuhu Bamalli's family, but was initially unsuccessful. A copy of the manuscript was eventually recovered by Professor Murray Last, a British historian who had known Dadasare during his long stays in Nigeria.

With sponsorship from Nigerian journalist Ibrahim Sheme, Ahmad arranged for the book's publication in 2019 by Informat Publishers. Sheme pushed for the original title to be restored, arguing that it was her first choice and that "Dadasare must have given the book that first title because it was completed the year Dr. East died, thereby suggesting that the lady must have found the epoch the right time to now tell the story of her life."
