= Hausa literature =

Literature in the Hausa language

Hausa literature is literature written in the Hausa language. It includes poetry, prose, songwriting, music, and drama. Hausa literature includes folk literature, much of which has been transcribed, and provides a means of recording, preserving, and transmitting knowledge, especially in regard to social, psychological, spiritual, or political roles.

Hausa works are classified based on whether they are poetry, prose or drama. Such works are then categorized according to historical periods; otherwise, they may be classified based on their adherence to certain aesthetic features or genres.

== History ==
Works of Hausa literature have reportedly existed since the 14th century, when the Hausa people began to write their scriptures. Originally, the Hausa language was written in an Arabic script called Ajami. At the time, the Hausa had no means of archiving their works for the future.

=== Early literature ===
Early poets included Ibn Al-Sabbagah and Muhammad Al-Barnawi. Other early Hausa writers using the Arabic script were Abdullahi Sikka and Sheikh Jibril Ibn Umar.

=== Rekindled interest ===
Works of the early Hausa literature were re-discovered by a jihad issued by Shehu Usman dan Fodio in the late 19th century. Elites of that period (royalists and Emires) became enamored with Hausa literature. During this period, the Hausa closely studied Islamic and Arabic literature. Royalists such as Usman dan Fodio, Muhammed Bello, and Nana Asmaʼu possessed many Islamic writings and works, all written in the Ajami or the Arabic script. During this revival, Islamic books were often written in Ajami, but by then scholars had a means of archiving their works for future generations.

From about 1800 to 1930, all Hausa literature was written in Ajami script as a result of deeply rooted Islamic influences. Following the arrival of British colonials in 1904, when the Hausa people were forced into Western-style education systems by their colonial masters, most Hausa became accustomed to reading and writing in the Latin script. Many religious writings by Usman dan Fodio and his younger brother Abdullahi dan Fodio remain from the nineteenth century. Nana Asma'u, daughter of Abdullahi Fodio, is considered one of the greatest women writers in northern Nigerian history.

Hausa novels were first introduced during the colonial period, when the Northern and Southern Nigerian Protectorates were combined. The Englishman Rupert East established a Hausa competition in late 1933; this led to the first ever novels written in Hausa. Under the auspices of the Translation Bureau of Northern Nigeria, many educators, writers, and academics engaged in a Hausa competition. Abubakar Imam won the competition with his debut novel, Ruwan Bagaja (meaning "The Curing Water"). Later that same year, the bureau published another book, this one by Muhammadu Bello Kagara, titled Ganɗoki, which helped encourage future writers and readers of Hausa. Years later, the bureau published another Hausa book, Magana Jari Ce ("Speaking is Profitable") by Abubakar Imam.

=== Modern usage ===
The drama form of Hausa literature is intended to show a performance of an actor during a gathering. The drama involves a combination of music and dance that takes place in a Dandali (opera house). Unlike English and Greek opera houses, the Dandali is an open place without assigned seating. The play is performed verbally by a playwright, and mainly comprises a dialogue between characters and the playwright.

The modern-day style of Hausa literature was established in 1999 by Hausa-language cinema. From that time, the cultural drama was abandoned by most Hausa natives in villages and towns due to the advancement of communication technology.

Modern Hausa women publish a genre of Hausa literature known as 'love books' (littattafan soyayya), which they often narrate over the radio.

== Noted Hausa writers ==
Islamic writers are categorised according to time period in which they lived.

=== Early period (14th – 17th centuries) ===
- Muhammad al-Maghili was a Berber from North Africa born in what is now Algeria. He wrote On The Obligations of Princes in Kano for Muhammad Rumfa in the 15th century.
- Muhammad ibn al-Sabbagh was a 17th-century scholar and author from Katsina, Northern Nigeria. He was a writer of praise poetry. For example, he wrote a poem celebrating the Sultan of Borno's conquest of the Jukun people. He also wrote a poem praising the Sultan of Katsina, Muhammad Uban Yari.
- Muhammad ibn Masani, also from Katsina, was the student of Muhammad ibn al-Sabbagh. He produced many works in the Hausa language during the 17th century, one of which was a documentary on the Yoruba people. Muhammad Bello, who lived some 200 years later, mentioned this work in his Infaq'l-Maysuur. His work Azhar al-ruba fi akhbar Yuruba was one of the earliest written accounts on the transatlantic slave trade by an indigenous African. He also noted that free Muslim people were taken from all parts of Hausaland and sold to European Christians. He also wrote to a jurist in Yorubaland explaining how to determine the time for the sunset prayer. He also transcribed a poem he had heard from Wakar Yakin Badara, a woman in Katsina. Muhammad ibn Masani is known to have written at least ten books.
- Abdullahi Suka was a 17th-century Kano scholar of Fulbe ancestry. He is said to have written the oldest extant literature in Hausa, Riwayar Annabi Musa. He also authored Al-Atiya li'l muti ("The Gift of the Donor") and many others.
- Salih ibn Isaq wrote an account of Birnin Garzargamu in 1658, describing the capital city of Borno during the reign of Mai Ali ibn Al Hajj Umar.
- Sheikh Jibril ibn Umar was an 18th-century scholar and author. In his work Shifa al-Ghalil, he criticised Muslims who mixed indigenous beliefs with Islam. The combination of animist practices and Islam was one of the main reasons given for the jihad declared by Uthman dan Fodio during the 19th century.

=== Renewal period (19th – 21st centuries) ===
Muslim Hausa scholars were discovered in the 19th century when their literary style once again became famous among Hausa Muslims.

- Abdullahi dan Fodio wrote many books about Islam in the Hausa language.
- Nana Asmaʼu was a writer and poet. Her contributions had a huge impact on the development of women's social and religious affairs within the regime of the Sokoto Caliphate. She wrote many books explaining the virtues of women in Islam.
- Abubakar Imam was an early novelist in northern Nigeria.
- Muhammadu Bello Kagara was an educator, writer, and royalist; he is the author of Gandoki.
- Abubakar Tafawa Balewa, the first Prime Minister of Nigeria, wrote the Hausa-language novel Shaihu Umar.

== See also ==
- Yoruba literature
- Efik literature
- Igbo literature
- Edo literature

== Bibliography ==
- Bobboyi, H., Yakubu, Mahmud.(2006). The Sokoto Caliphate: history and legacies, 1804–2004, 1st Ed. Kaduna, Nigeria:Arewa House. ISBN 978-135-166-7
- Hamman, Mahmoud, 1950- (2007). The Middle Benue region and the Sokoto Jihad, 1812-1869 : the impact of the establishment of the Emirate of Muri. Kaduna: Arewa House, Ahmadu Bello University. ISBN 978-125-085-2. OCLC 238787986.
- Usman Muhammad Bugaje. The Tradition of Tajdeed in West Africa: An Overview International Seminar on Intellectual Tradition in the Sokoto Caliphate & Borno. Center for Islamic Studies, University of Sokoto (June 1987)
- Hugh A.S. Johnston . Fulani Empire of Sokoto. Oxford: 1967. ISBN 0-19-215428-1.
- S. J. Hogben and A. H. M. Kirk-Greene, The Emirates of Northern Nigeria, Oxford: 1966.
- Muhammadu Bello Kagara. Sarkin Katsina. ISBN 978-169-209-X
