= Culture of Northern Nigeria =

Nigerian authors culture in north

The culture of Northern Nigeria is mostly dominated by the culture of the Fourteen Kingdoms that dominated the region in prehistoric times, but these cultures are also deeply influenced by the culture of over one hundred ethnic groups that still live in the region.

== Literature ==
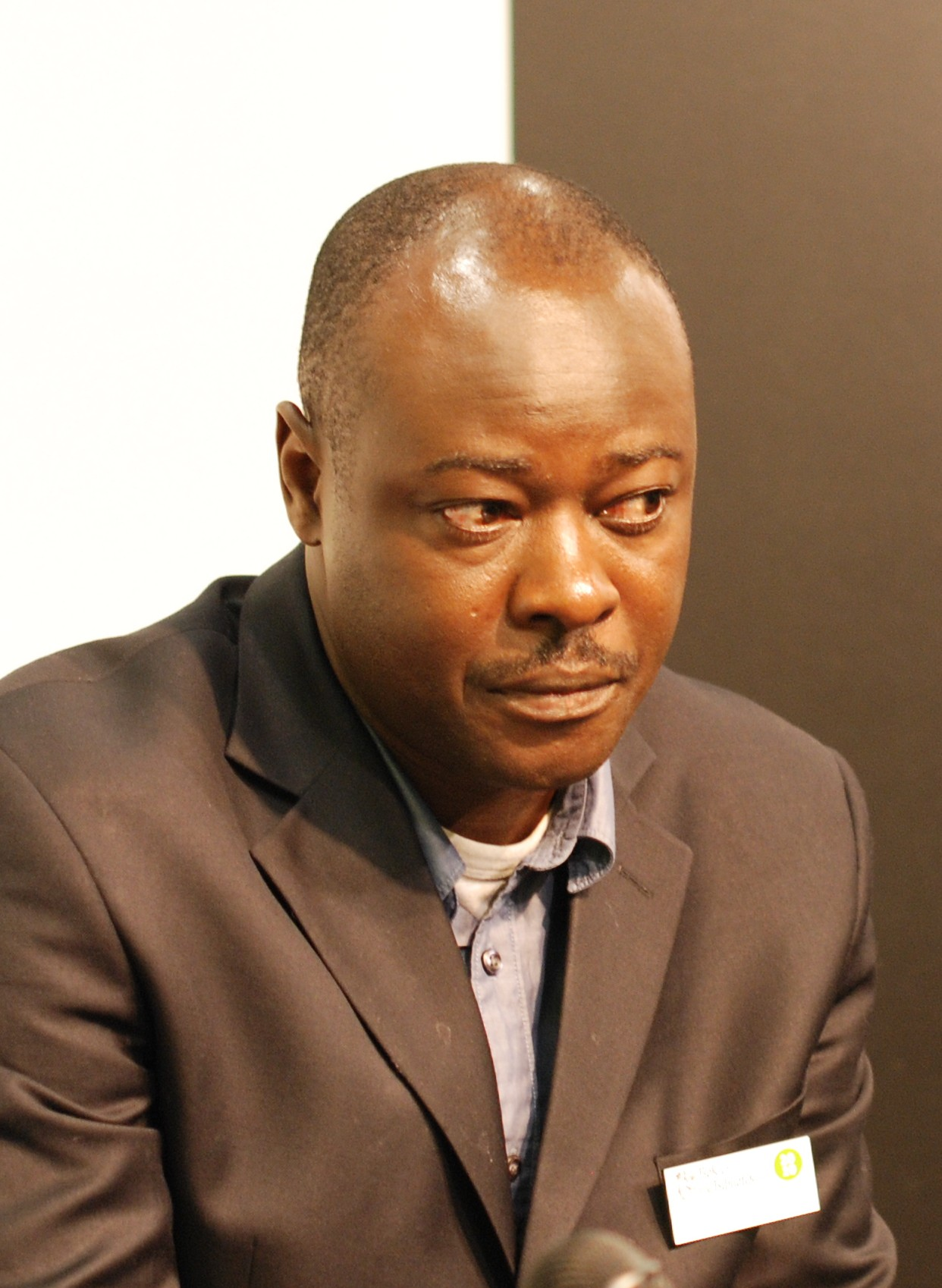
Helon Habila of Northern Nigeria

Northern Nigeria inherited much of the literary legacy of the old Sudanic states. The Hausa Sultanates from the 9th to the 18th century produced numerous literary works. Thousands of such works mostly in Ajami, Hausa and Arabic still remain uncatalogued throughout Northern Nigeria. Since the colonisation by the British Empire, English and the Latin script has superseded the Ajami script. Abubakr Imam Kagara is regarded as one of the fathers of modern Northern Nigerian literature, His works such as Ruwan Bagaja and Magana Jari Ce, published in the 1930s, served as a bridge between the old Sudanic literary tradition and western ways.

Others such as Yabo Lari and Muhammed Sule – author of The Undesirable Element – made equally important contributions in the 1960s. In the 1980s popular authors including Abubakar Gimba and Zaynab Alkali served to keep the North's literary tradition alive and distinct from the Nigerian south. The 1990s saw the emergence of authors from Abubakar Othman, Ismail Bala and Ahmed Maiwada in poetry to Maria Ajima and Victor Dugga in drama. Contemporary Northern Nigerian literature is mostly produced in Kano, Kaduna, Jos and Minna. Writers such as B. M. Dzukogi, Ismail Bala, Yusuf Adamu, Musa Okapnachi, Razinat Mohammed and E. E. Sule are still active.

== Music ==
While the old Sudanic tradition mostly concentrated on poetry and sung poetry, from the 1950s influx of British influence served to fertilise Northern Nigerian music. Dan Maraya Jos, Mamman Shata, Barmani Choge, Aliyu Dan Kwairo and a host of others are regarded as the founders of the distinct Northern Nigerian stylistic musical genre. Others such as Fatima Uji continue to be popular. Since the 1990s influence of pop culture has led to rise of Northern Nigerian R&B singers. Northern Nigerian singers including Adam Zango, Ice Prince Zamani, Idris Abdulkareem and King Bawa are popular throughout Africa.

== Cinema ==
Northern Nigeria's movie industry, known as Hausa Cinema, was one of the first commercial film industries in sub-Saharan Africa. The industry was created by veteran journalists and actors from Radio Kaduna and RTV Kaduna in the 1950s. Today actors such as Ali Nuhu, Adam A Zango, Sani Danja, and Ibrahim Maishukku are popular within the region. Since the 1990s and the slow rise of Islamic fundamentalism through the proselytizing campaigns of the Izala Society, Northern Nigerian cinema has witnessed considerable setbacks and has now been dwarfed by its Southern Nigerian counterpart.
