= Abdu Gusau =

Nigerian civil engineer (1918–1994)

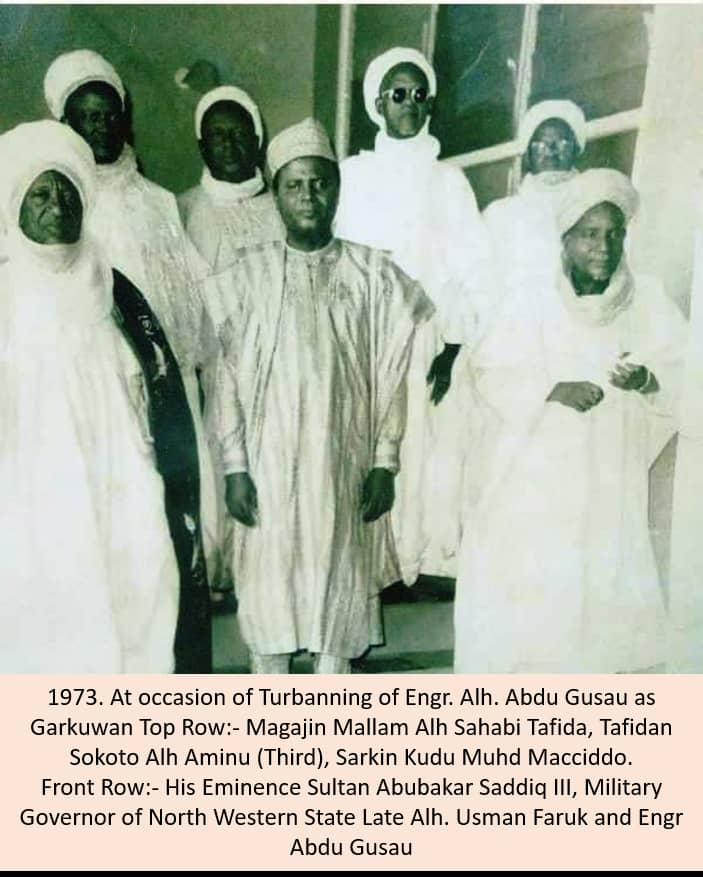
- Born: 15 July 1918; Gusau, Zamfara, Nigeria
- Died: 1994 (aged 75–76)
- Title: Garkuwan Sokoto
- Honours: MBE, OON

Abdu Gusau, Garkuwan Sokoto, MBE, OON (1918–1994), was a Nigerian civil engineer, and statesman who served as the Garkuwa of Sokoto until his death in 1994. He was the Chief estate engineer for Ahmadu Bello University, Zaria from 1967 to 1972 where he was in charge of estates, which included buildings (both design and construction), the campus road network and the water supply. Gusau also served as a principal engineer with Taylor Woodrow of London where he worked on building London Heathrow's airport terminal.

Gusau was the civil commissioner for the now defunct North western state Nigeria from 1972 to 1975.

== Biography ==
He was born on 15 July 1918 in the town of Gusau in present-day Zamfara state.

=== Primary education ===
He attended elementary school at Gusau from 1927 to 1930 and then went on to middle school in Sokoto from 1930 to 1935.

=== Secondary and higher education ===
Alhaji Gusau later attended Katsina higher college (later Barewa College, Zaria) from 1935 to 1939. He later matriculated from Yaba higher college for further studies in Lagos from 1946 to 1947.

In 1947, Alhaji Gusau was awarded a scholarship to study at the Acton technical college (now Brunel University) in London, and later on obtained an HND in mechanical engineering from Woolwich Polytechnic (now University of Greenwich; 1948–1951).

== Career ==
Alhaji Gusau began his career in the Nigerian Civil Service when he joined the Sokoto local authority works department as a Junior technical staff in November 1939. During his time there, he was promoted and assigned as the "wakilin ayukka" officer in charge of construction at the Gusau aerodrome. Upon his return from studying in the UK in 1951, Alhaji Gusau rejoined the Sokoto local authority works department briefly, after which he moved on to work for Taylor Woodrow Construction. He was part of a team of engineers that constructed London Heathrow's airport terminal in 1953. In 1955, he was made resident engineer of Sokoto local authority works where he was responsible for all buildings and roads in the emirate. He was the Chief estate engineer of Ahmadu Bello University, Zaria from 1967 to 1972 where he was in charge of estates, which included buildings (both design and construction), the campus road network and water supply; in 1972 he was appointed the civil commissioner for the North western state overseeing all civil works in the region.

Alhaji Gusau also served as a member of many boards:

Boards that Gusau served/chaired.
Board	title	Date
Northern regional board of education, Kaduna	Member	1958–1966
North Western state public service commission	Member	1968–1972
Central bank of Nigeria	Director	1961–1972
The Antiques Commission	Member	1961–1966
The Morgan commission on salaries and wages review	Member	1962–1964
Northern Nigeria investment Limited	Director	1972–1978
Usman Dan Fodio University Sokoto	Director of works, Adviser on Physical planning	1976–1978
Cement company of Northern Nigeria, Sokoto	Chairman	1978–1984
Board of Directors, Sokoto polytechnic	Member	1984–1986
Messr Engineering, and consulting associates, Kano	Director	1984–1986
Messr Micheletti and sons construction co. Enugu	Director	1984–1986
Messr Jos Housen and Sohne water co.	Director	1984–1986
Sokoto state rural electricity board	Chairman	1987–1994
University of Ilorin	Pro chancellor and Chairman	1987–1994

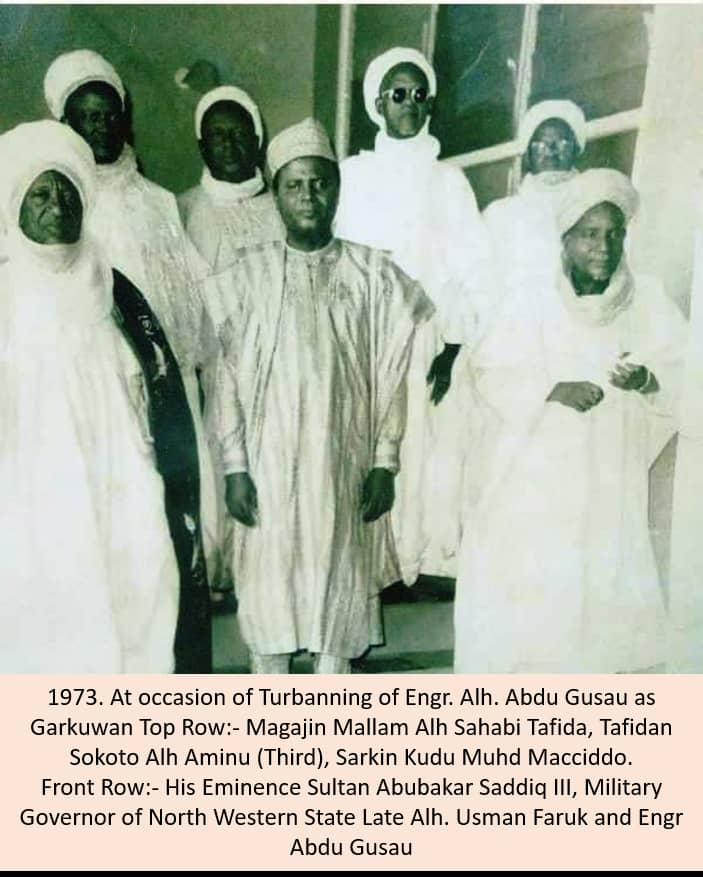
Alhaji Abdu Gusau at his turbaning ceremony in 1973

== Awards and honors ==
Alhaji Gusau was awarded 'the most excellent order of the British Empire' (MBE) award by Queen Elizabeth II in 1959 (conferred to him in 1961), and an Order of the Niger (OON) award in 1964. He was turbaned the 'Garkuwan sokoto' on the 18th of march, 1973 by the Sultan of Sokoto.

== Relationship with Sardauna Ahmadu Bello ==
Sir Ahmadu Bello was appointed teacher at Sokoto middle school upon completion of Katsina college. Gusau was amongst many of his students whom he mentored, and maintained close ties with for the remainder of his life. They became even closer during Sardauna's time at Gusau where he helped him get a scholarship to study at the Woolwich Polytechnic in 1947. Upon his return to Sokoto after his engagement with Taylor Woodrow, Abdu Gusau was urged by the Sardauna to stay in Sokoto, and help oversee its urgent development rather than join him in Kaduna (Bello was minister of works then). Abdu Gusau would go on to assist the Sardauna with many of his building projects, both public and private works.

== Legacy ==
The Abdu Gusau Polytechnic in Zamfara state is named after him.

== Personal life and death ==
Gusau was a conservative Sunni Muslim and was married to three wives. He was survived by 26 children and many grandchildren. He died on 4 November 1994 at the age of 76 in Ilorin, Kwara State Nigeria.

== Gallery ==
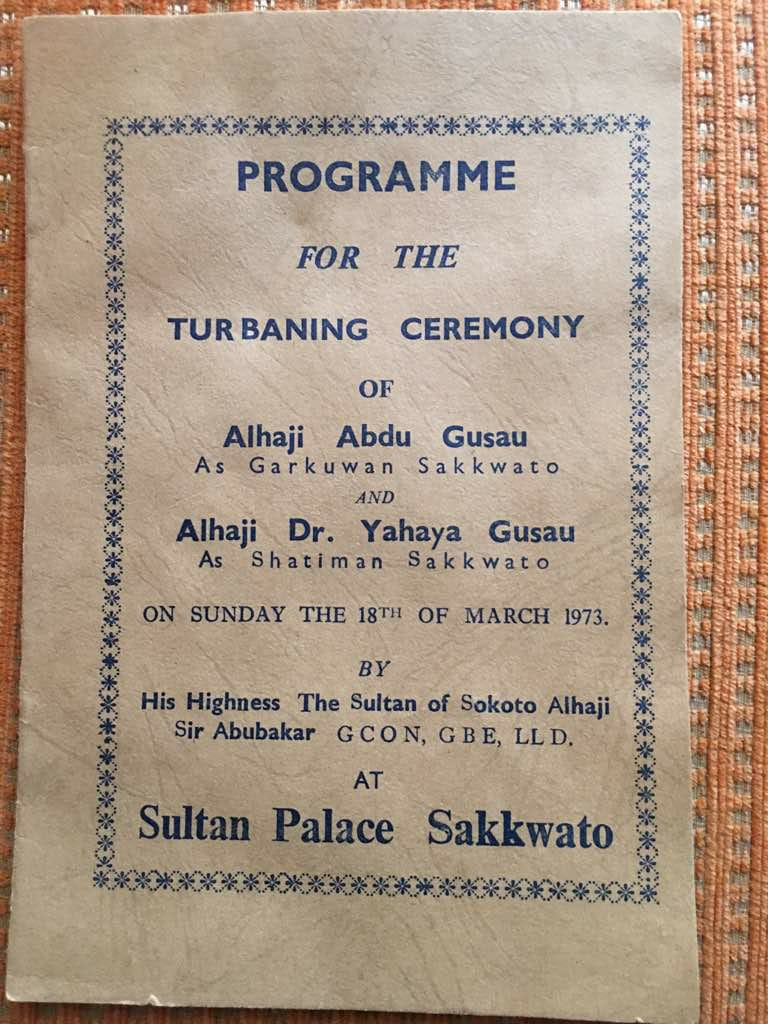
Programme of events Gusau turbaning ceremony

== See also ==
- Ahmadu Bello
- Siddiq Abubakar III
- Hassan Katsina
- Usman Faruk
- Umaru Mohammed
