= Gaskiya Ta Fi Kwabo =

Nigerian newspaper

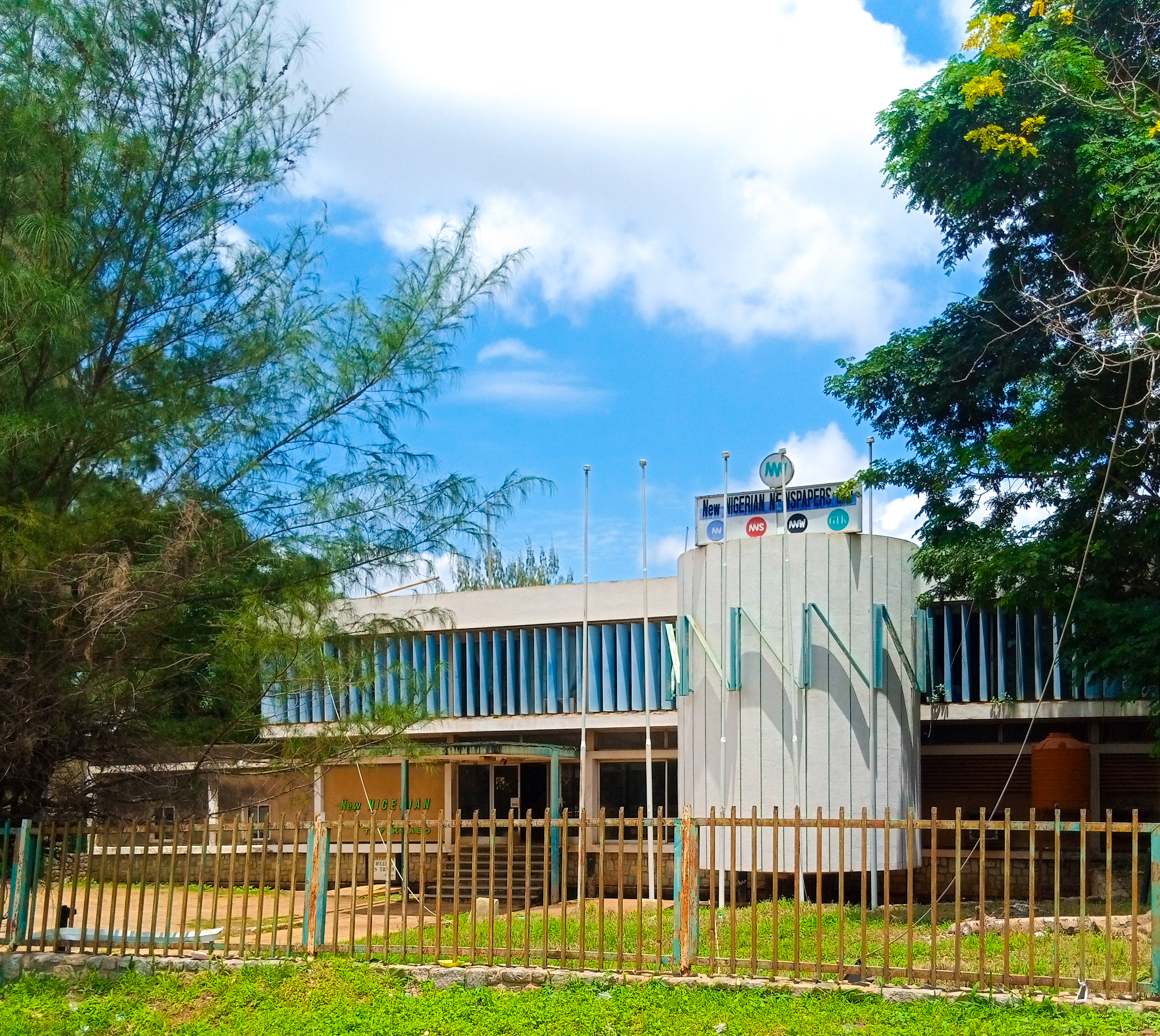
- Gaskiya Tafi Kwabo in August 2021
- Type: Tri-weekly
- Founded: January 1939
- Language: Hausa
- Headquarters: Nigeria

Gaskiya Ta Fi Kwabo ("The truth is worth more than a kobo"; kobo is a subunit of the Nigerian naira currency) is a Nigerian newspaper, printed three times a week. It is the world's first Hausa-language paper, and was one of northern Nigeria's first periodicals. Gaskiya Ta Fi Kwabo's first editor was Abubakar Imam. In 1941, some pages in Ajami were added to the newspaper for those who could not read the Roman script. They were called "`Yar Gaskiya" ("Daughter of Truth").

== History ==
The history of the paper, according to journalist Dayp Duyile in 1989, is dated back to 1937 when there was false rumour that the British Colonial Administration was planning to handover her West African Colonies to Adolf Hitler of Nazi Germany. This rumour created a lot of fear in the people. A medium of communication was therefore needed by the colonial masters to cancel the tension. Since there was no major newspaper in the North as compared to the South, the Government therefore concluded on setting up a vernacular newspaper which was to be known as Gaskiya Tafi Kwabo.

== See also ==
- Northern Nigerian Publishing Company Limited
- Abubakar Imam
- Magana Jari Ce
- Dadasare Abdullahi
