= Muhammadu Bello Kagara =

Novelist in Nigeria

Wali Muhammadu Bello Kagara
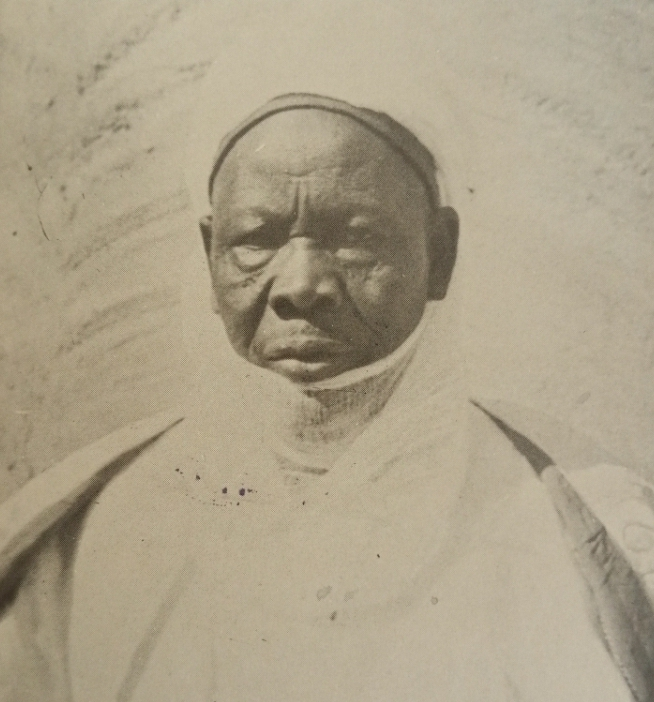
- Born: 1890; Katsina Emirate
- Died: 21 November 1971 (aged 80–81)
- Citizenship: Nigerian
- Occupations: Author and Alkali, Walin Katsina
- Writing career
- Notable work: Ganɗoki (1933)

Muhammadu Bello Kagara Hausa pronunciation (1890 – 1971) was an educator, a writer and a royalist. He wrote the famous book novel known as Gandoki, the novel is a manuscript written during a literature bureau competition organized in 1933 by Rupert East. His book Ganɗoki was considered either first or second book to be published in the entire Northern Nigeria, the first or the second being Ruwan Bagaja by Abubakar Imam.

== Early life ==
Kagara was born to the family of the Alkali (chief judge) of Kagara, called Shehu Usman. When he was a young boy, his parents fled Kontagora alongside Sarkin Sudan Nagwamatse to escape from the control of occupying British forces.

== Education ==
Kagara attended Nassarawa School. After his graduation, he taught at the Zaria Provincial School (Alhudahuda College), laterteaching Islamic religious and Arabic studies at Katsina College (now Barewa College) until 1945.

== Work ==
Later on in his career, he was given the royal title of his father, known as the wali or Daneji of Katsina and he became the traditional chief judge "Alkali" in Katsina native authority.

== See also ==
- Abubakar Imam
- Ruwan Bagaja
- Magana Jari Ce

== Bibliography ==
- Bobboyi, H., Yakubu, Mahmud.(2006). The Sokoto Caliphate: history and legacies, 1804-2004, 1st Ed. Kaduna, Nigeria:Arewa House. ISBN 978-135-166-7
- Hamman, Mahmoud, 1950- (2007). The Middle Benue region and the Sokoto Jihad, 1812-1869 : the impact of the establishment of the Emirate of Muri. Kaduna: Arewa House, Ahmadu Bello University. ISBN 978-125-085-2. OCLC 238787986.
- Usman Muhammad Bugaje. The Tradition of Tajdeed in West Africa: An Overview International Seminar on Intellectual Tradition in the Sokoto Caliphate & Borno. Center for Islamic Studies, University of Sokoto (June 1987)
- Hugh A.S. Johnston . Fulani Empire of Sokoto. Oxford: 1967. ISBN 0-19-215428-1.
- S. J. Hogben and A. H. M. Kirk-Greene, The Emirates of Northern Nigeria, Oxford: 1966.
- Kagara, Muhammadu Bello (1981). Sarkin Katsina, Alhaji Muhammadu Dikko, C.B.E., 1865-1944. Zariya: Northern Nigerian Pub. Co. ISBN 978-169-209-X. OCLC 11124769
