= List of Nigerian states by date of statehood =

The following table presents a listing of the states of Nigeria, and the dates of their creation.

State	Date created	Preceding Entity
Abia State	27 August 1991	Imo State
Adamawa State	27 August 1991	Gongola State
Akwa Ibom State	23 September 1987	Cross River State
Anambra State	3 February 1976	East Central State
Bauchi State	3 February 1976	North-Eastern State
Bayelsa State	1 October 1996	Rivers State
Benue State	3 February 1976	Benue-Plateau State
Borno State	3 February 1976	North-Eastern State
Cross River State	27 May 1967	South-Eastern State
Delta State	27 August 1991	Bendel State
Ebonyi State	1 October 1996	Enugu State and Abia State
Edo State	27 August 1991	Bendel State
Ekiti State	1 October 1996	Ondo State
Enugu State	27 August 1991	(old) Anambra State
Gombe State	1 October 1996	Bauchi State
Imo State	3 February 1976	East Central State
Jigawa State	27 August 1991	Kano State
Kaduna State	27 May 1967	North-Central State
Kano State	27 May 1967	North-Central State
Katsina State	23 September 1987	Kaduna State
Kebbi State	27 August 1991	Sokoto State
Kogi State	27 August 1991	Kwara State and Benue State
Kwara State	27 May 1967	West Central State
Lagos State	27 May 1967	Federal Territory of Lagos
Nasarawa State	1 October 1996	Plateau State
Niger State	3 February 1976	North-Western State
Ogun State	3 February 1976	Western State
Ondo State	3 February 1976	Western State
Osun State	27 August 1991	Oyo State
Oyo State	3 February 1976	Western State
Plateau State	3 February 1976	Benue-Plateau State
Rivers State	27 May 1967	Bendel State
Sokoto State	3 February 1976	North-Western State
Taraba State	1 August 1991	Gongola State
Yobe State	27 August 1991	Borno State
Zamfara State	1 October 1996	Sokoto State
Federal Capital Territory	3 February 1976	Benue-Plateau, North-Central, and North-Western States
