= Northern Nigerian Publishing Company Limited =

Publishing Company

The Northern Nigerian Publishing Company Limited is one of the oldest publishing company in Northern Nigeria base in Zaria.

== History ==
The company is the second publishing company in Northern Nigeria after Northern Provinces Newsheet established in Kano that are publishing books in Ajami and Hausa.

== Publication ==
Most of its publication focused on Nigerian Books, especially Books that are related to Hausa language, the Company has published books for well-known Hausa authors of Northern Nigeria, including Magana Jari Ce, Ruwan Bagaja by Abubakar Imam, Ganɗoki by Muhammadu Bello Kagara, other Books include Shaihu Umar, Jiki Magayi . The company is the first Nigerian Publishing Company to produce a Hausa Book in the year 1934 called Ruwan Bagaja by Bello Kagara. and the most populous Hausa story book Magana Jari ce.

== See also ==
- University Press plc
- Abubakar Imam
- Muhammadu Bello Kagara
- Magana Jari Ce
- Ruwan Bagaja

== Bibliography ==
- Furniss, Graham (1996). Poetry, prose and popular culture in Hausa. International African Institute. Edinburgh: Edinburgh University Press for the International African Institute. ISBN 978-1-4744-6829-9
