= Abdu Gusau Polytechnic =

Polytechnic school in Zamfara State, Nigeria

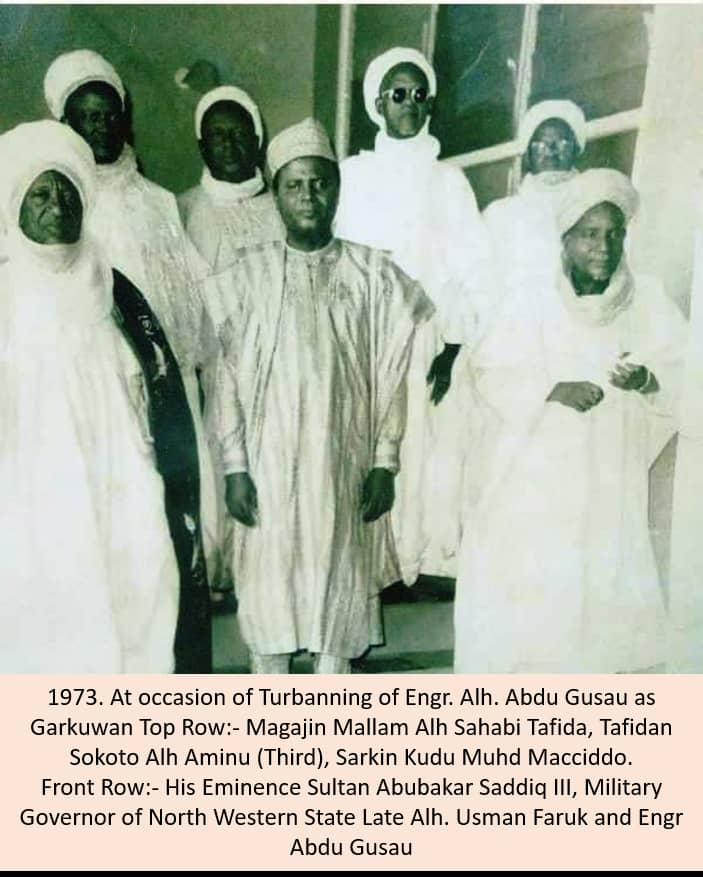
- Alhaji Abdu Gusau at his turbaning ceremony in 1973
- Type: Polytechnic
- Established: 1992
- Founder: Yahaya Abdulkarim
- Location: Talata Mafara, Zamfara State, Nigeria; 12.56079°N 6.07938°E
- Website: https://sis.agpmafara.edu.ng/

Abdu Gusau Polytechnic is a state government polytechnic located in Talata Mafara, Zamfara State, Nigeria.

== History ==
The polytechnic was established in 1992 after the former governor of Sokoto State, Yahaya Abdulkarim signed a bill that established the 'Talata Mafara Polythecnic'. The Sokoto state government renamed the Polytechnic to 'Abdu Gusau Polytechnic' in February, 1995. This was done in honor of the late engineer Abdu Gusau who died in November, 1994, in recognition of his contribution to the development of the State. Zamfara state of Nigeria was created by a Federal decree in 1996, and this necessitated the relocation of the polytechnic to a new permanent site in Talata Mafara. The Sokoto state government was no longer responsible for it, and it wasn't legally possible to have an institution belonging to Zamfara state located in Sokoto.

== As of 2020 ==
Abdu Gusau Polytechnic is now a fully developed institution offering programmes in all fields of human endeavour. It is now set to meet up with the challenges of the universal technological advancements. As of 2020 the Polytechnic has 19 departments, and 2524 students, offering programmes in several fields of study. The institution currently offers ND's (National Diploma) in courses such as; mass communication, banking & finance, civil law, building engineering, electrical engineering and HND's (Higher National Diploma) in office technology management, business, bio chemistry, computer science and statistics.

== National Diploma Programme ==
- ND Business Administration
- ND Office Technology Management
- ND Mass Communication
- ND Banking & Finance,
- ND Accounting
- ND Science Laboratory Technology
- ND Computer Science
- ND Computer Engineering, Statistics, Architecture, Mechanical Engineering,
- ND Civil Engineering
- ND Building engineering
- ND Quantity survey
- ND Electrical Engineering
- ND Mechatronic
- ND Library Science,
- Diploma In Civil Law
- Diploma in Sharia and Civil Law

== Higher National Diploma Programmes ==
- HND Business Administration
- HND Office Technology Management
- HND Accounting, Applied Science
- HND Microbiology
- HND Biochemistry
- HND Environmental Sciences
- HND Physics
- HND Computer Science
- HND Statistics
- Higher Diploma in Arabic and Islamic Sharia

== See also ==
- Academic libraries in Nigeria
