= Usman Faruk =

First Military Governor of North-Western State, Nigeria

Military Governor of North-Western State
- In office 27 May 1967 – 29 July 1975
- Preceded by: Hassan Katsina (Northern Region)
- Succeeded by: Lt. Colonel Umaru Mohammed

Personal details
- Born: 1932 Gombe
- Died: 18 December 2020 (aged 87–88)

Alhaji Usman Faruk (1932 – 18 December 2020) was the first Military Governor of North-Western State in Nigeria from 1967 to 1975 after it was split off from the old Northern Region during the military regime of General Yakubu Gowon. He was dismissed from office by General Murtala Mohammed, who took power in a coup on 29 July 1975, and who then launched a probe that found him guilty of illegally enriching himself while in office. He was later reinstated by the Ibrahim Badamasi Babangida regime after being cleared of all charges, and was given his full benefits and retirement rank. Shortly after he left office, the state was split into Niger State and Sokoto State.

== 1988 pamphlet ==
Faruk published a pamphlet in 1988 that attacked the national population control program that the Nigerian military government was advocating. In it, he said that "No good Muslim will ever accept any human directive which contravenes the laws of Allah." He said that widespread promotion of anti-pregnancy drugs and devices would lead to "an earthquake of moral laxity." This view, common in the North, may have contributed to the spread of AIDS and polio.

== Community marketing board ==
Faruk supported establishing a commodity marketing board to fix or control the prices of produce and animals such as cows, goats and sheep. The board would also preserve produce for times of need, and would set up processing companies for perishable produce such as tomatoes and other vegetables.

== Police commissioner ==
Faruk was a former Commissioner of Police. In a 2006 press interview, he said that the poor pay and equipment of the police could not be justified, and was the cause of the state of insecurity in the country.

== Awards and honours ==
Faruk was awarded Commander of the Order of the Niger (CON) by the Olusegun Obasanjo administration in September 2006.

== Personal life and death ==
In July 2009, his third son, Police Superintendent Abdulaziz Faruk, was killed during violence in Maiduguri triggered by the Boko Haram extreme Islamist sect.

Faruk was reported dead in December 2020.

== Bibliography ==
- Usman Faruk (1992). The struggle of the national association for the creation of more states. Northern Nigerian Pub. Co. ISBN 978-169-314-2.
- Usman Faruk (1995). My vision. Hudahuda Publishing Co.
- Usman Faruk (2006). From farm house to government house: path of destiny. Amana Publishers. ISBN 978-056-261-3.
