= Female education in Nigeria =

Women and girls in Nigeria have a basic human right to education; this right has been recognized since the 1948 adoption of the Universal Declaration on Human Rights (UDHR)

To ensure equal access to education, the National Policy on Education states that access to education is a right for all Nigerian children regardless of gender, religion and disability.

== Importance ==
According to a 2014 report, female education has an important impact on the development of a stable, prosperous and healthy nation state resulting in active, productive and empowered citizens. Educating girls develop growth rates, encourages independence of the girl child and reduces social disparities. In 2009, the Nigerian Population Council (NPC) observed that women with higher educational qualifications are more likely to be in formal wage employment than those at the level of primary school education.

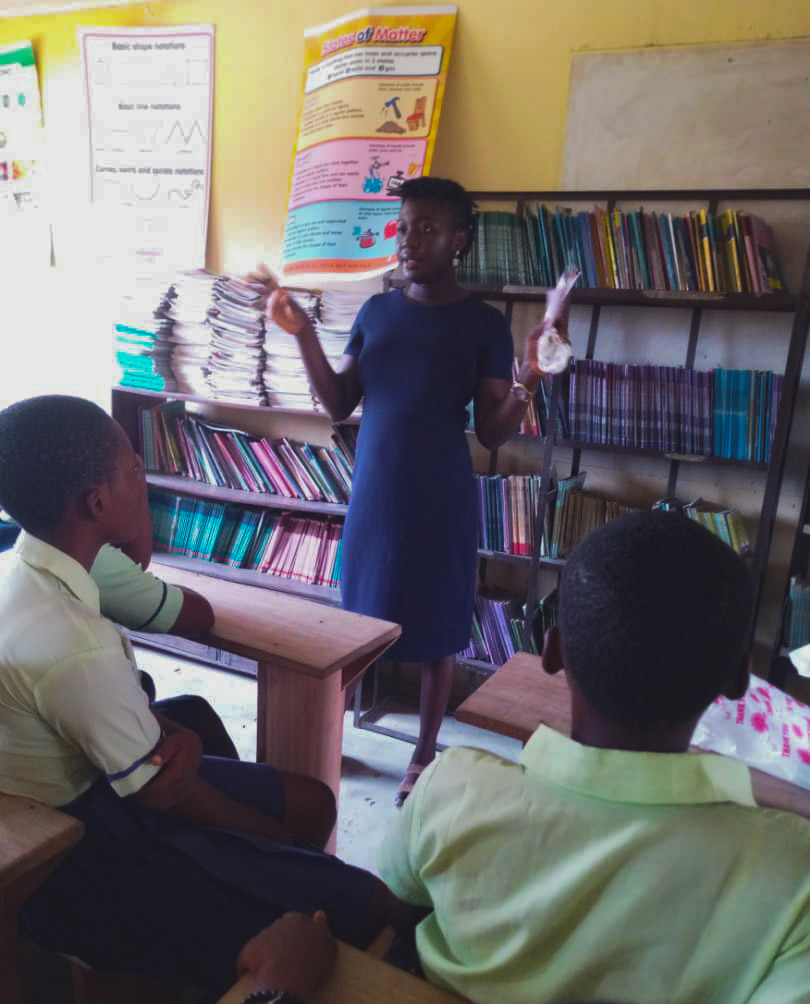
Female students and female teacher in class

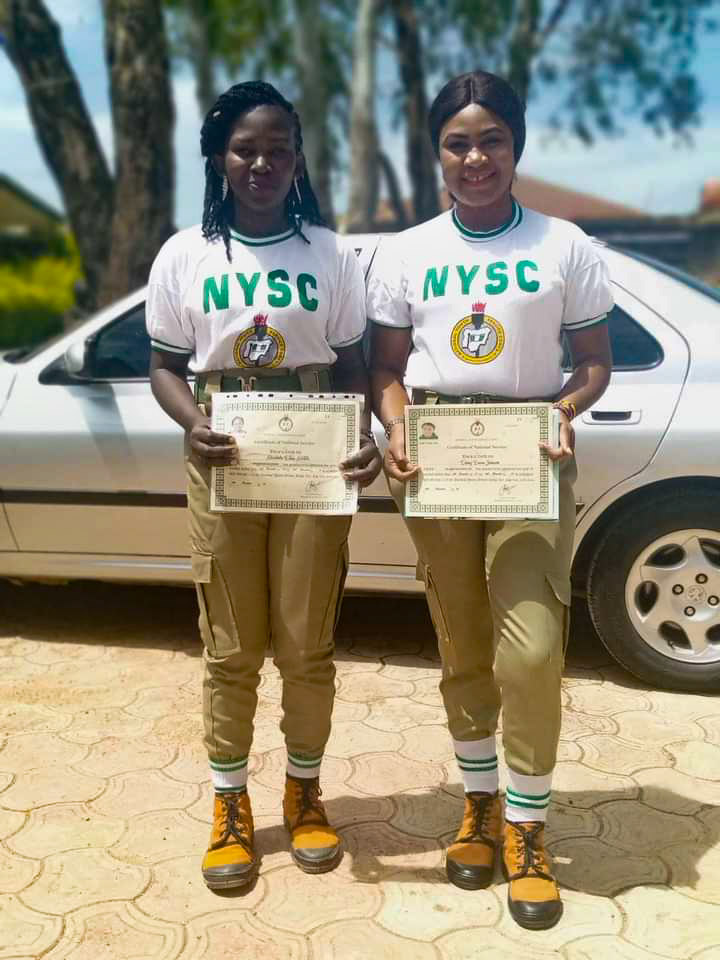
Female Youth Corps in Nigeria

A positive correlation exists between the enrollment of girls in primary school and the gross national product (GNP) and increase of life expectancy. Because of this correlation, enrollment in schools represents the largest component of the investment in human capital in any society. Rapid socioeconomic development of a nation has been observed to depend on the quality of women and their education in that country. Education gives women a disposition for a lifelong acquisition of knowledge, values, attitudes, competence, confidence, independence and skills.

== History ==
Before 1920, primary and secondary education in Nigeria was within the scope of voluntary Christian organizations. Out of 25 secondary schools established by 1920, three were girls only, and the remainder were exclusively for boys. In 1920, the colonial government started giving out grant to voluntary associations involved in education, the grant-giving lasted till the early 1950s. At that point, education was placed under the control of regions. In 1949, only eight out of a total of 57 secondary schools were exclusively for girls. These schools are Methodist Girls' High School, Lagos (1879), St Anne's School, Molete, Ibadan (1896), St. Theresa's College, Ibadan (1932), Queens College, Lagos, (1927) Holy Rosary College, Enugu (1935), Anglican Girls Grammar School, Lagos, (1945), Queen Amina College and Alhuda College, Kano. From 1950 up till 1960, six more notable schools were established and by 1960, there were fourteen notable girl's schools, ten mixed and sixty-one boys only.

== 1960s ==
During the 1960s, when most African states (countries) began to gain political independence, there was notable gender inequality in education. Girls' enrollment figures were very low throughout the continent. In May 1961, the United Nations' Universal Declaration of Human Rights and UNESCO's educational plans for Nigeria were announced in a conference held in Addis Ababa, Ethiopia. A target was set to achieve 100% universal primary education in Nigeria by the year 1980.

== 1970s ==
The implementation in the 1970s of the free and compulsory Universal Primary Education (UPE) was in line with this UN Plan. Since then, UNICEF and UNESCO and many other organizations have sponsored, research and conferences within Nigeria regarding the education of girls. Up until the 1970s, considerably more boys than girls participated in education in Nigeria. According to one Nigerian historian, Kitetu, the native traditions' philosophy was that a woman's place is at home and this kept many girls away from education. However, with the government's intervention and public awakening, parents began to send and keep their girl children in school. Consequently, women's involvement became more visible.

== 1990s and beyond ==
Purposeful plans of action led to an increase in females in schools after 1990. While more boys than girls were enrolled in 1991 by a difference of 138,000 in 1998, the difference was only 69,400. At the pan-African Conference held at Ouagadougou, Burkina Faso, in March and April 1993 (three decades after the UN Declaration of the 1960s) it was observed that Nigeria was still lagging behind other regions of the world in female access to education. It was also noted that gender disparity existed in education and there was need to identify and eliminate all policies that hindered girls' full participation in education.

== Gender disparity in schools ==
The Female literacy rate in Nigeria by state in 2013. > 90% 80-90% 70-80% 60-70% 50-60% 35-50% < 35%

From 1970 to 1994, the enrollment of girls in primary education steadily increased from 30% to as high as 80%. However, differences exist between enrollment of males and females in all levels of education. In addition, the drop out rate of girls is higher than boys and participation in STEM classes are lower for girls than boys. In 2002, the combined gross enrollment for primary, secondary and tertiary schools for female was 57% compared to 71% for males.

This translates into fewer women in certain economic fields. The percentages of female workers in some selected professions in 2012 were as follow: architects, 2.4%, quantity surveyors, 3.5%, lawyers/jurists, 25.4%, lecturers, 11.8%, obstetricians and gynecologists, 8.4%, pediatricians, 33.3%, media practitioners, 18.3%.

Issues of gender equality in education have been the subject of much debate during the past decades and have become a prominent topic of debate in all countries. In Nigeria, there are large gender disparity between the education that which boys and girls receive. Many girls do not have access to adequate education past a certain age. those girl that have access, drop out of the school as a result of early marriage compare to the male child. In 2010, the female adult literacy rate (ages 15 and above) for Nigeria was 59.4% in comparison to the male adult literacy rate of 74.4%. It is differences in education that have led to this gap in literacy. The gender gap in literacy rates in 2000 at the rural level between boys and girls was 18.3 percent in favour of the boys overall. In the age group 6–9 years (primary school ages) it was 3.9 percent in favour of boys.

This indicates that there is a gender dimension to educational attainment and development in Nigeria. According to the Examination Council of Nigeria (1994) there are still other problems, such as high drop-out rates of females students, poor performance, reluctance on the part of females students to enroll in science-based courses and poor classroom participation Across various geo-political delineations in Nigeria, a greater percentage of school-age girls are needlessly out-of-school, compared with the ratio applicable to boys of same age grouping.

Gender disparity is also visible in the education of children with disabilities, a study in the 1990s revealed that only 37% of disabled females are literate compared to 57% for males. A reason for this situation is the cultural notion that the male will carry the family name while the female will marry. Also, the option of street begging by young disabled girls in order to earn income can inhibit their attendance of classes.

The completion of the second Millennium Development Goal's (MDG) target i.e. 'education for all' by 2015 is at risk after having missed the initial deadline of 2005. In Nigeria, educational facilities are generally believed to be inadequate and access is limited for many, especially girls and women. According to the United Nations Human Development Report (2005), Nigeria was classified as a low developed country in respect of equality in educational accessibility.

=== Reasons behind the disparity ===
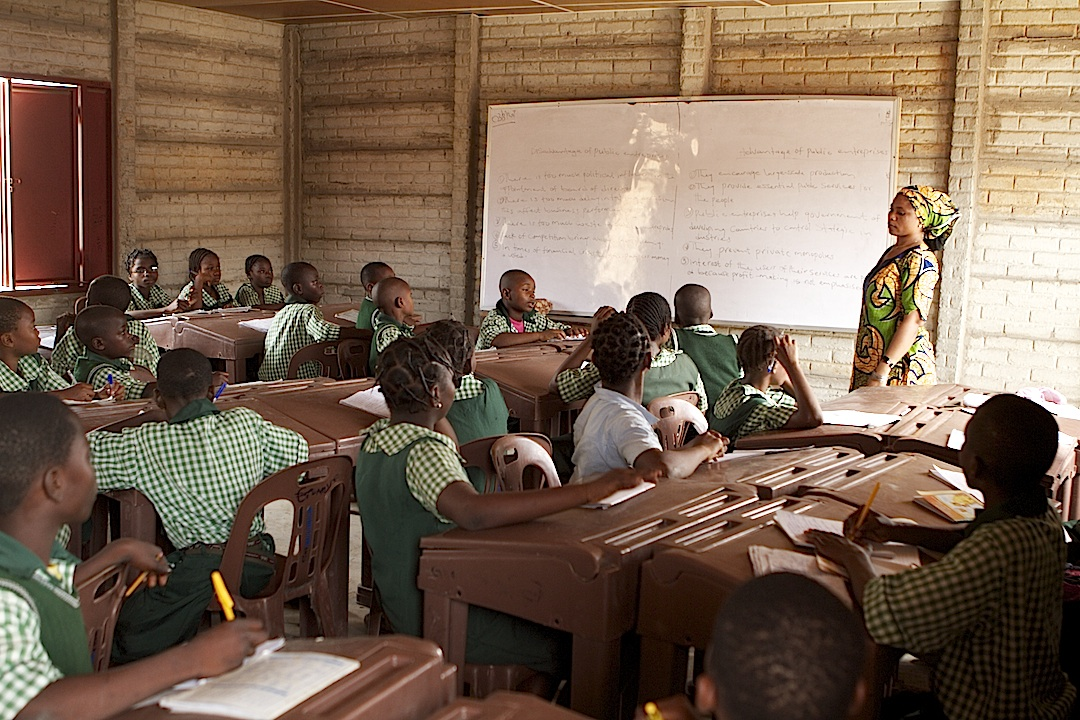
A Nigerian classroom

There are various cultural and socioeconomic issues in Nigeria that prevent women from having adequate access to education. Among other factors that influence girls' disparity in education, parents/Guardians account for 90 percent, religious leaders 69 percent, traditional leaders 54 percent, and community-based organizations 51 percent. Poverty is also a prevalent factor behind the disparity, for many guardians are willing to send their wards or children to school but financial incapability becomes a restraint most times and preference will be given to the male children if the opportunity arises because of the nature of the Nigerian society.

==== Culture, values and tradition ====
Various cultural and social values have historically contributed to gender disparity in education. According to work done by Denga, one prominent cultural view is that it is better for the woman to stay home and learn to tend to her family instead of pursuing Western education. To explain the fact that more boys than girls participated in education, Nigerian researcher Obasi identified a host of constraints with 'Nigerian tradition' being named as top of the list.

The 'Nigerian tradition' was explained as a tradition that attaches higher value to a man than a woman, whose place is believed to be the kitchen. A study by the University of Ibadan linked the imbalance in boys' and girls' participation in schooling was to the long-held belief in male superiority and female subordination. This situation was further aggravated by patriarchal practices which gave girls no traditional rights to succession. Therefore, the same patriarchal practices encouraged preference to be given to the education of a boy rather than a girl.

The Nigerian society (both historical and contemporary) has been dotted with peculiar cultural practices that are potently hurtful to women's emancipation, such as early/forced marriage, wife-inheritance and widowhood practices. As daughters self-identify as females with their mother and sisters, and sons as males with their father and brothers, gender stereotyping becomes institutionalized within the family unit. Also, the dominant narratives of religion in both colonial and post-colonial Nigerian society privileges men at the detriment of women, even in educational accessibility.

==== Cost of education ====
The decline in economic activities since the early 1980s has made education a luxury to many Nigerians, especially those in rural areas. Because Nigerian parents are known to invest in children according to sex, birth order or natural endowments, girls and boys are not exact substitutes. Often the family can only afford to send one child to school. Because daughters have assumed responsibilities in the home, she is less likely to be the one to attend school.

==== Colonial policies ====
At the beginning of colonialism, rigid ideals about gender perceptions were imposed on the African mind. Thereafter, the woman's role has come to be limited to sexual and commercial labour; satisfying the sexual needs of men, working in the fields, carrying loads, tending babies and preparing food. The disempowering colonial 'ideology of domesticity' as espoused by the practice of 'housewification' provided the springboard for women's educational imbalance in parts of Africa. As such, the overall human development in Nigeria is being hindered by this unevenness in educational accessibility across gender categories.

== Early marriage ==
In most parts of Nigeria, especially in the northern areas, many young girls are given out in marriage at an early age. The girl may not be able to attain higher education due the responsibilities of bearing children and being a young mother.

== Significance ==
While most of the Millennium Development Goals face a deadline of 2015, the gender parity target was set to be achieved a full ten years earlier – an acknowledgement that equal access to education is the foundation for all other development goals. In countries where resources and school facilities are lacking, and total enrollments are low, a choice must often be made in families between sending a girl or a boy to school. Until equal numbers of girls and boys are in school, it will be impossible to build the knowledge necessary to eradicate poverty and hunger, combat disease and ensure environmental sustainability. Millions of children and women will continue to die needlessly, thus placing the rest of the development agenda at risk. It is extremely important that girls have access to an education. For every additional year girls go to school, they receive 20 percent higher wages and suffer 10 percent fewer child deaths.

Women with some formal education are more likely to seek medical care, ensure their children are immunized, be better informed about their children's nutritional requirements, and adopt improved sanitation practices. As a result, their infants and children have higher survival rates and tend to be healthier and better nourished. According to The International Center for Research on Women, the education that a girl receives is the strongest predictor of the age she will marry and is a critical factor in reducing the prevalence of child marriage. The World Bank estimates that an additional year of schooling for 1,000 women helps prevent two maternal deaths. Also, each additional year of formal education that a mother completes translates to her children staying in school an additional one-third to one-half of a year.

Many policy analysts consider literacy rates as a crucial measure to enhance a region's human capital. This claim is made on the grounds that literate people can be trained less expensively than illiterate people, generally have a higher socio-economic status and enjoy better health and employment prospects. If women are these illiterate people, that makes them even more disposable to their economy. Policy makers also argue that literacy for women increases job opportunities and access to higher education. Although it is often viewed that a woman working in the home benefits her family, it puts a strain on the whole community as education is one of the keys to success and being able to prosper. According to Ojo, women in Nigeria are harder-hit than men by poverty due to the lack of emphasis placed on female education, and the prevalence of early marriage which tend to further impoverish women, and subject them to statutory discrimination.

The most important ingredient of employment opportunity is education, especially higher education. If employment opportunities are different, standards of living, life expectancies and other parameters of existence and of well-being, will be different. "For Nigeria to achieve the goal of being among the largest 20 economies in the world, she must rapidly educate the children, most of all, the girls. Educating girls is known to be the basis for sound economic and social development. Educating girls produces mothers who are educated and who will in turn educate their children, care for their families and provide their children with adequate nutrition," says Dr. Robert Limlim, UNICEF's Deputy Representative. "Therefore educating girls translates to better health for the children, reduction in child morbidity and mortality, thus triggering off a snowball effect of achieving all the other MDGs in a sustainable manner."

== Women's education in Northern Nigeria ==
Global efforts are being pushed toward the achievement of the goal of Universal Basic Education (UBE) in Nigeria. Women's education is one of the critical issues in northern Nigeria. According to the Nigeria Demographic and Health Survey (2013) while observing National average reviewed a survey which reflected that 40.4% females as against 29.5% males have never attended school (NPC/RTI, 2014). The figures for females are greater in northern states than in that south. In north-east and north-west about two-thirds of females never attended school compared to about one-eighth of females in south-west and south-south. It was reported by UNESCO in 2014 that 70% young women between the age of 15–24 in the North West have not completed primary school.

=== Women's role with the rise of education ===
Women's roles in Nigeria have experienced changes over the years especially during the pre- colonial, colonial and currently in the post-colonial era. Their roles cut across both the private and public domain, women play major roles as reproducers and controllers of their reproductive functions, decision makers in the home, role models and mentors to their children, as well as employees and employers of labour in Nigeria (Kangiwa, 2015, p. 754). Notwithstanding the roles mention above which women play in developing their nation, the government is yet to pay adequate attention to it and give them the necessary support (Iyela, 1998, p. 222)

== Current policies of progression ==
Currently Nigerian women are making progress within their society. In recent years, three male-dominated professions, the Nigerian Medical Association, the Nigerian Bar Association and the Institute of Chartered Accountants of Nigeria, have been led by female presidents. The successive creation of the National Commission for Women and a ministerial portfolio for Women Affairs provide additional avenues for the promotion of women's educational issues and the enhancement of the role of women in national development by way of a statutory body and a Ministry. In addition to this, the Engineering profession which is also considered to be a heavily gender-marginalised field has seen some changes with the establishment of Women Engineering bodies responsible for promoting Women representation in the Engineering field. One of such organisations is APWEN.

Today, more children go to school and learn to read and write than in previous decades. As a result, younger persons are much more likely to be literate than older persons. In a survey conducted by the International Education Statistics measured Nigerian literacy across different 5-year age groups. Among persons aged 15 to 19 years – those who were of primary school age in the 1990s – the literacy rate is 70%. Among persons 80 years or older, only 13% are literate. Additionally, the gap between boys and girls aged 15 to 19 is only 11%.

Nigerian women's access to formal education is still being constrained due to their unfair workload within the household division of labour. Consequently, the realization of the MDG3's 'gender equality and women empowerment' targets is being impeded harshly. Moreover, according to Bhavani, such unequal social and gender relations needs to be transformed in order to take women out of want and poverty. A 2007 UNESCO and UNICEF report addressed the issue of education from a rights-based approach. Three interrelated rights were specified and must be addressed in concert in order to provide education for all:

- The right of access to education – Education must be available for, accessible to and inclusive of all children weather male or female gender.
- The right to quality education – Education needs to be child-centered, relevant and embrace a broad curriculum, and be appropriately resourced and monitored.
- The right to respect within the learning environment – Education must be provided in a way that is consistent with human rights, equal respect for culture, religion and language and free from all forms of violence.

UNESCO estimates that an estimated $11 billion per year is necessary to reach the 2015 EFA goals. The imbalance between need and aid is apparent: aid sent to low-income countries to provide basic education in 2004 and 2005 was at an average of $3.1 billion per year. The Fast Track Initiative (FTI) provides one of the most promising paths to universal primary education by 2015. Set up as a partnership between donors and developing countries and non-governmental organizations, the FTI endorses developing countries that put primary education at the forefront of their domestic efforts and develop sound national education plans. Nigeria is already maximizing these resources for the advancement of the younger generation.

The Convention on the Elimination of All Forms of Discrimination against Women (CEDAW), adopted in 1979 by the UN General Assembly and acceded to by 180 States, sets down rights for women, of freedom from discrimination and equality under the law. CEDAW has realized the rights and equality of woman is also the key to the survival and development of children and to building healthy families, communities and nations. Article 10 pinpoints nine changes that must be changed in order to help Nigerian women and other women suffering from gender disparity. It first states, there must be the same conditions for careers, vocational guidance, and for the achievement of diplomas in educational establishments of all categories in rural as well as in urban areas. This equality shall be ensured in pre-school, general, technical, professional and higher technical education, as well as in all types of vocational training.

Second, is access to the same curricula, the same examinations, teaching staff with qualifications of the same standard and school premises and equipment of the same quality. Third, is the elimination of any categorized concept of the roles of men and women at all levels and in all forms of education. This is encouraged by coeducation and other types of education which will help to achieve this aim and, in particular, by the revision of textbooks and school programs and the adaptation of teaching methods.

Fourth, the same opportunities to benefit from scholarships and other study grants. Similarly, fifth is the same opportunities of access to programs of continuing education, including adult and functional literacy programs, particularly those aimed at reducing, at the earliest possible time, any gap in education existing between men and women. Sixth, is the reduction of female student drop-out rates and the organization of programs for girls and women who have left school prematurely. Seventh concern listed is the same opportunities to participate actively in sports and physical education. Lastly, is access to specific educational information to help to ensure the health and well-being of families, including information and advice on family planning.

=== Timeline ===
Government policies that affect girl-child education since 1985 include:

- 1986: Blueprint on Women's Education. An outreach and awareness campaign to promote the importance of equal education, increase the available educational resources for females and reduce drop out rates among female students.
- 1986: Nomadic Education Programme. Increase the access to education for children of Nomads without jeopardizing pastoralism.
- 1991: National Commission for Mass Literacy and Non-formal Education. A policy to motivate parents and families to send their school-age children to school and to establish training facilities that concentrate on domestic science, home economics and crafts.
- 1994: Family Support Basic Education Programme. A programme to encourage families living in rural areas to send girls to go to school as a means of promoting youth development.
- 1999: Universal Basic Education. Reduction in geographic and gender disparity in school enrolment.
- 2001: National Policy on Women
- 2002: Education For-all Fast Track Initiative.
- 2003: Strategy for Acceleration of Girls Education in Nigeria.
- 2004: National Economic Empowerment and Development Strategies (NEEDS).
- 2004: Universal Basic Education Act.

== Institutions ==
Primary and secondary schools for girls:

Nigeria has 104 Federal Unity Colleges spread across the six geo-political zones of the country consisting:

- Federal Government Girls' College (FGGCs) – 39 (Girls only);
- Federal Science and Technical Colleges (FSTCs) 20 mixed and 1 (FSTC Uyo) for Girls only – 21
- Federal Government Academy (for the Gifted and Talented Children) Boys and Girls; – 2
- Federal Science Colleges (Boys and Girls) one in the North West and one in the South – South Geo-Political Zones – 2

Ogun State

- Abeokuta Girl's Grammar School, Onikolobo, P.M.B. 2039, Abeokuta.
- Aiyepe Girls' High School, Aiyepe, Via Ijebu-Ode
- Anglican Girls' Grammar School, Box 35, IjebuOde
- Baptist Girls College, Abeokuta
- Federal Government Girls' College, Sagamu, Ogun state Nigeria
- Ijebu-Igbo Girls' Grammar School, P.M.B. 1003, Ijebu-Igbo
- Louisville Girls High School, Ijebu – Ode, Ogun State.
- Muslim Girls' High School, Ijebu-Ode
- Our Lady of Apostles, Box 212, Ijebu-Ode
- Solid Rock Girls Academy, Old Lagos-Ibadan Road, Sagamu, Ogun, Nigeria

Lagos State

- Methodist Girls' High School
- Marywood Girls' College
- Surulere Girls' Secondary School
- Reagan Memorial Baptist Girls' Secondary School
- New Era Girls' Senior Secondary School
- Eva Adelaja Girls Secondary Grammar School
- Lagos Anglican Girls Grammar School

Imo State

- Federal Government Girls' College, Owerri

Rivers State

- Methodist Girls High School (Port Harcourt)
- Federal Government Girls' College, Abuloma, Port Harcourt
- Government Girls' Secondary School, Harbour Road, Port Harcourt
- Archdeacon Crowther Memorial Girls' School, Elelenwo, Port Harcourt
- Holy Rosary College, Port Harcourt
- Government Girls' Secondary School, Rumuokwuta, Port Harcourt
- Government Girls' Secondary School, Ahoada, Rivers state

== See also ==
- List of Nigerian universities
- List of polytechnics in Nigeria
- Schools in Nigeria

General:

- Women in Nigeria
- Education in Nigeria

== Sources ==
- Risikat, Dauda (December 2007). "Female Education and Nigeria's Development Strategies: Lots of Talk, Little Action?". Indian Journal of Gender Studies. 14 (3).
