= Umaru Mohammed =

Military Governor of North-Western State, Nigeria

Brigadier General Umaru Mohammed
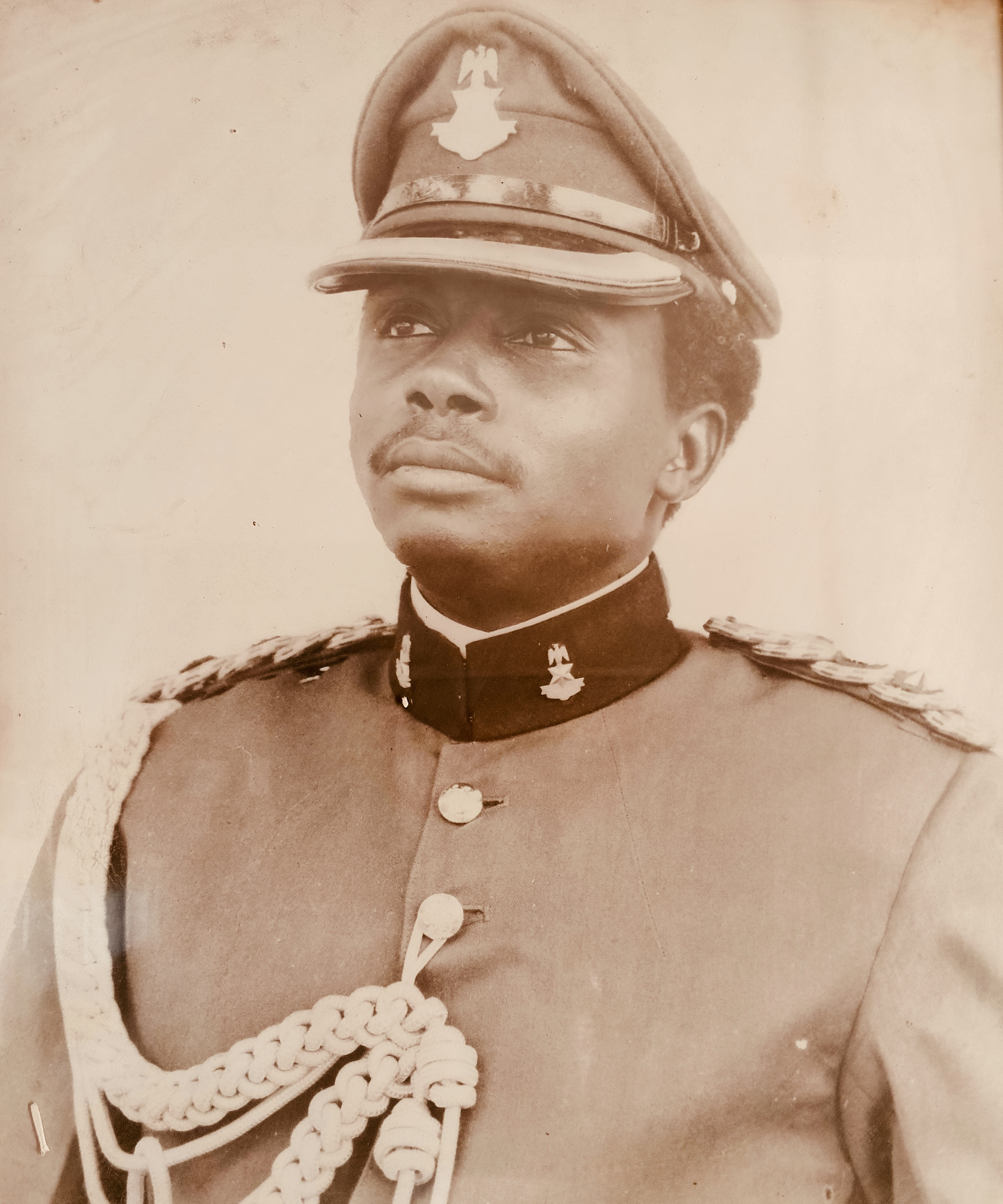

Military Governor of North-Western State and Sokoto State
- In office July 1975 – July 1978
- Preceded by: Usman Faruk
- Succeeded by: Gado Nasko

Personal details
- Born: Hadejia, Jigawa State, Nigeria
- Died: 26 May 1980

Military service
- Allegiance: Nigeria
- Branch: Nigerian Army
- Rank: Brigadier General

Umaru Muhammed was appointed Governor of North-Western State in Nigeria in July 1975 at the start of the military regime of General Murtala Mohammed. In February 1976 North-Western State was split into Niger State and Sokoto State. Umaru Mohammed continued as Governor of Sokoto State until July 1978.

Umaru Mohammed died on 26 May 1980 in a crash of an Air Force Fokker F27 on the way to São Tomé and Príncipe on a diplomatic mission. He was travelling in place of his professional friend Ibrahim Babangida, who had just been approved to travel to the United States for professional training.
