= Abubakar Imam =

Nigerian writer (1911–1981)

Abubakar Imam O.B.E C.O.N L.L.D (Hon.) N.N.M.C.
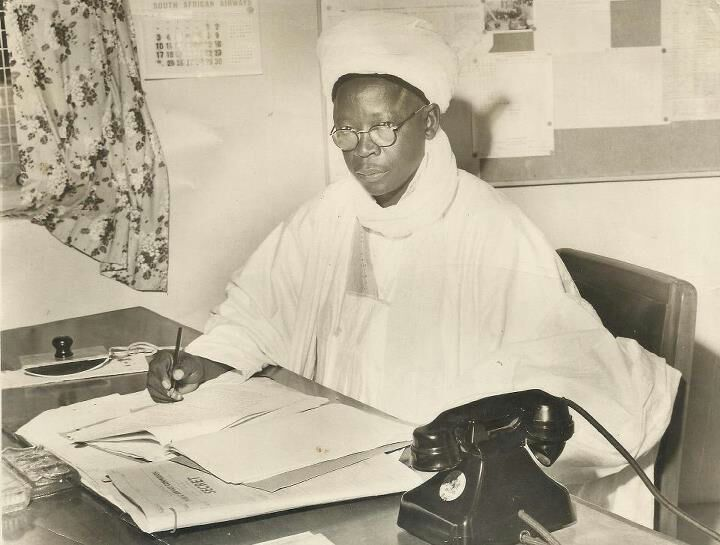
- Born: 1 February 1911; Kagara, Northern Nigeria Protectorate
- Died: 1981 (aged 69–70); Zaria
- Education: University of London Institute of Education
- Years active: 1911–1981
- Website: www.abubakarimam.com

Abubakar Imam ' (1911 - 1981) was a Nigerian writer, journalist and politician from Kagara, Niger in Nigeria. For most of his life, he lived in Zaria, where he was the first Hausa editor of Gaskiya Ta Fi Kwabo, the pioneer Hausa-language Newspaper in Northern Nigeria.

== Education ==
He attended Katsina College and the University of London's Institute of Education. He submitted the play Ruwan Bagaja for a literary competition in 1933.

== Work ==
In 1939, together with Rupert Moultrie East and a few others, they started the Gaskiya corporation, a publishing house, which became a successful venture and created a platform for many Northern Nigerian intellectuals. The exposure of many premier writers in Northern Nigeria to the political process influenced Imam to join politics. In 1952, with the formation of the Northern People's Congress (NPC), together with Umaru Agaie and Nuhu Bamalli, they formed the major administrative nucleus of the party.

== Publication ==
Alh Abubakar Imam was also the author of Magana Jari Ce with the help of some collections provided by East, author of Ruwan Bagaja and Tafiya mabudin ilmi, a book He wrote on his experiences after a visit to London. He was also the author of Tarihin Annabi Kammalalle, a biography of Muhammad

Publication

- Magana Jari Ce 1,2,3
- Ruwan Bagaja
- Northern Nigerian Publishing Company Limited
- Gaskiya Ta Fi Kwabo
- Muhammadu Bello Kagara
- Hausa Bakwai(7)
- Auren Zobe
- Tambaya Goma Amsa Goma (the Path to Islam)
- Ikon Allah Part I- Dr. East da Imam
- Ikon Allah Part II- Dr. East da Imam
- Karamin Sani Kukumi Part I
- Six Hausa Plays Karamin Sani Kukumi Part II

== Bibliography ==
- Furniss, Graham (1996). Poetry, Prose and Popular Culture in Hausa. Edinburgh: Edinburgh University Press. ISBN 978-1-4744-6829-9. OCLC 1147287556.
