= Ruwan Bagaja =

1933 novel by Abubakar Imam

Ruwan Bajaga
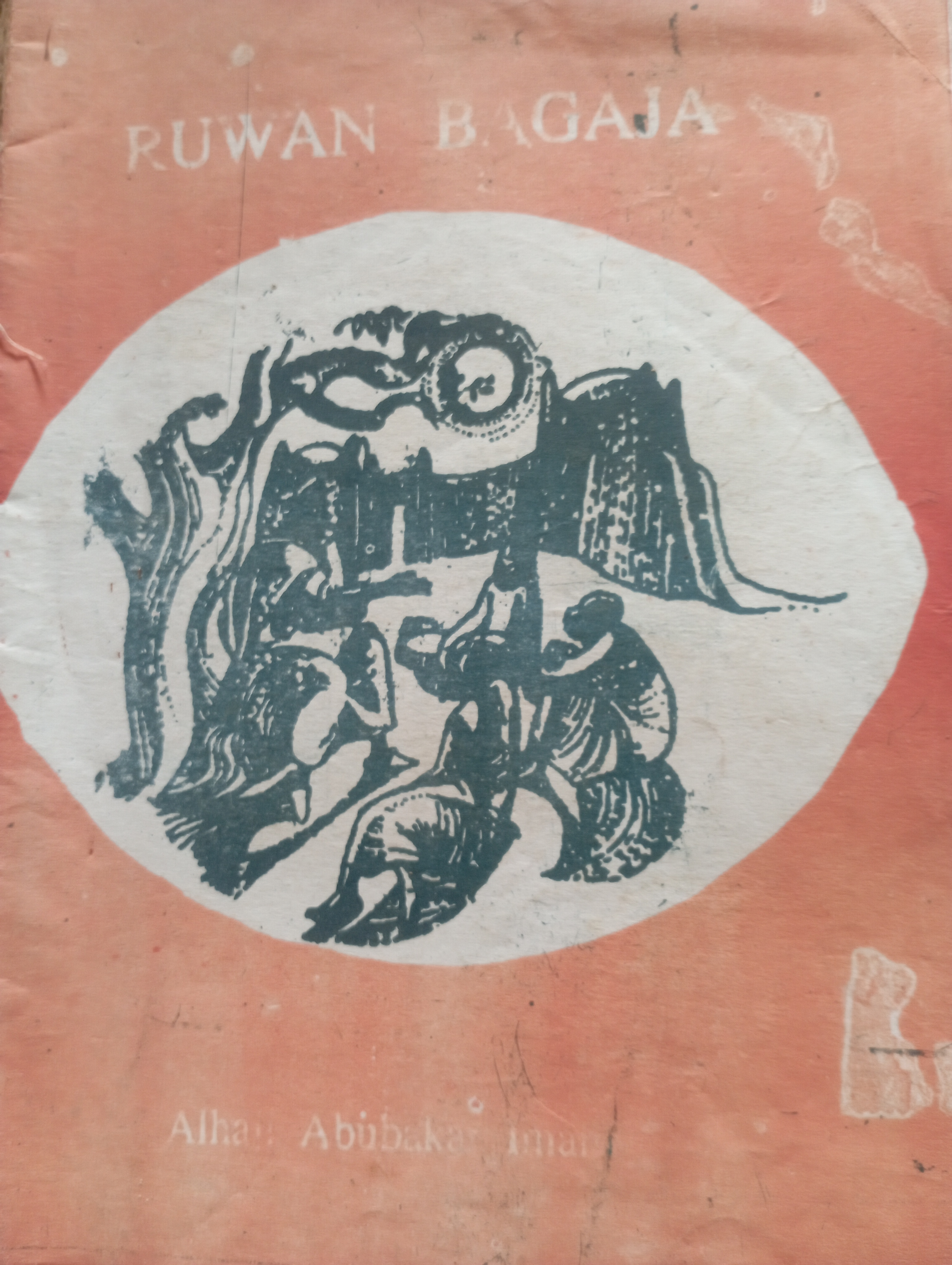
- First edition
- Author: Abubakar Imam
- Language: Hausa
- Publisher: Northern Nigerian Publishing Company Limited
- Publication date: 1934
- Publication place: Nigeria

Ruwan Bagaja Hausa pronunciation literally meaning "Water of Cure" is a debut novel written in Hausa language by Dr Abubakar Imam at the age of 22 years, He presented the book during a literature bureau competition organised by Rupert East in the year 1933 in Zaria. Abubakar Imam won second prize for his presented book, thus marking his territory as an author to contend with. With the acclaim from Ruwan Bagaja, he went on to publish nearly 20 other Hausa books including the celebrated three-volume collection of stories Magana Jari Ce.

== History ==
Abubakar Imam was a primary school teacher in Katsina Middle School. At the age of twenty two, he went to Zaria from his state of origin Niger State to participate in a contest which was organized by Rupert East. He settled in Zaria for six months where he wrote the novel Ruwan Bajaga as his debut novel to present in the contest in the year 1933.

== Publication ==
The book was first published in 1934 by the Literature Bureau in Zaria and later by the Northern Nigerian Publishing Company Limited. A school-reader translation into English was published in 1971 and eventually translated by Augustine Genesis K and co. It has also been translated into Russian as Zhivai︠a︡ voda :povestʹ.

== Plot ==
In the beginning of the novel Ruwan Bagaja, it starts with a quest story of a young man who sets out on an adventure to find Ruwan Bagaja (Water of Cure). He travels through many places, kingdoms, deserts and sees many wonders of Earth. At some point, he was told that no human had ever been able to reach it for centuries and due to this dry spell without actual contact with it, the reality of Ruwan Bagaja slowly faded away into a myth, becoming a fairy tale as if it never existed. The protagonist however insists that if the water of cure did indeed exist, then he saw no reason to give up his search for it as he had left everything behind in search of Ruwan Bajaga.

== Legacy ==
Since 1934, Ruwan Bajaga had been held in high regards among Hausa books for its authentic lexical structure of the Hausa language. It remains part of the teaching curriculum in many educational institutions across Nigeria and West Africa. The book has been narrated in audio format for listening.

== See also ==
- Abubakar Imam
- Magana Jari Ce
- Northern Nigerian Publishing Company Limited

== Bibliography ==
- Furniss, Graham (1996). Poetry, Prose and Popular Culture in Hausa. Edinburgh: Edinburgh University Press. ISBN 978-1-4744-6829-9. OCLC 1147287556.
