= North-Western State =

North-Western State is a former administrative division of Nigeria. It was created on 27 May 1967 from parts of the Northern Region and existed until 3 February 1976, when it was divided into two states – Niger and Sokoto. The city of Sokoto was the capital of North-Western State.

== North-Western State Governors ==
- Usman Faruk (28 May 1967 – July 1975)
- Umaru Mohammed (July 1975 – 1976)
