= Magana Jari Ce =

Novel by Abubakar Imam

Magana Jari Ce/Wisdom is an Asset
- 1960 edition
- Author: Abubakar Imam
- Language: Hausa
- Publisher: Northern Nigerian Publishing Company Limited
- Publication date: 1937 (Part 1)
- Publication place: Nigeria

Wisdom is an Asset (Magana Jari Ce, rendered more loosely by Rupert East as "[the] ability to tell stories is a valuable possession") is a trilogy of novels by Abubakar Imam of the Northern Nigeria Protectorate, jointly regarded as one of the most significant literary works authored in the Hausa language. The first part was published by the Northern Nigerian Publishing Company Limited in 1937, the subsequent two parts by the Zaria Corporation. Magana Jari Ce is listed on the Nigerian secondary school curriculum as recommended reading for the subject of Hausa language and culture.

== History ==
After winning a literary competition organised by Rupert East in 1933, Abubakar Imam embarked on a successful career as a writer, starting with his 1934 debut novel Ruwan Bagaja. During the same six-year stay in Zaria, he penned and published the Magana Jari Ce series.

== Plot ==
The novel tells the story of a young prince and his pet parrot Aku. It also depicts royalist and royal life within Hausa emirates, where royalists struggle for royal title inheritance, which makes them optimistic to make plans to inherit imperial, royal and noble ranks. The story begins with the story of a rich emir who has a kingdom but unfortunately doesn't have a child that will inherit his wealth and become the future king. Fortunately for the emir, a traditional sheikh dreams that if the emir will gather together 40 imams to pray for him for about 40 days, God will answer their prayers and bless him with a child. The result is the birth of Musa, the young crowned prince and heir to the throne.

When Musa is about 12 years of age, an Emir from Sinari kingdom sends his visier to Emir Abdurahman, the father of Musa, proposing a marriage engagement to his daughter Princess Sinaratu. This marriage proposal upsets Sarki Abdurahman, which makes him disgrace the visier of Sinari by telling him many unpleasant things and sending him out of his kingdom in shame.

Upon what happened the visier to Sarki Abdurahman joins hand with Sarkin Sinari to fight his own emir in return of a throne, he sent his slave to direct them into the kingdom by following unknown route to come inside the kingdom and overthrow the emir. The plan was unsuccessful and Emir Abdurahman wished to retaliate. As Sarki Abdulrahman must leave to go to war, he left his visier on the throne to rule over the kingdom, not knowing that his visier is a traitor to the kingdom.

Upon his leaving, the visier decided to kill the crown prince and, hoping for the emir to die in war, would make him the righteous heir to the throne. Crown prince Musa's father left the palace to fight, having ordered his most trusted slaves to protect his son against any internal traitor who might harm the prince.

The crown prince's pet parrot, Aku, has knowledge of the past, present and future, so the parrot entertains the prince with stories, so that he does not leave the palace in pursuit of his father and expose himself to danger.

== Characters ==
The characters include

- Sarki Abdurahman the royal Emir, father of the crowned prince Musa and grandfather to Mahamudu.
- Waziri the visier to Sarki Abdurahman who couch allegiance to Sarkin Zinari to invent the kingdom in return of making him the crown emir.
- Musa the crown prince, son of Sarki Abdurahman.
- Mahamudu the son of the daughter of Sarki Abdurahman, and a childhood friend of Crowned Prince Musa, also son to the 70-year-old commander of the kingdom. As a small boy, to inherit the position of his father, he would have to fight side by side with Emir in war.
- Waziri Aku which means parrot, is a pet of the crowned prince Musa, who later became the visier to the royal Emir. He is the storyteller to the young crown prince to take away his curious emotional feelings and to deviate the crown prince from leaving the palace to follow his father into battle, which the visier would like to take advantage of killing the crown prince outside the palace.
- Sarkin Zinari, Abdulaziz dan Shehu Mukhtar, the rival emir to Sarki Abdurahman, who was upset as a result of declining his wedding proposal to Musa son of Sarki Abdurahman and for disgracing his visier whom he sent for the proposal.
- Sinaratu daughter to the Emir Sarkin Zinari, who he wants to marry prince Musa.
- Wazirin Sinari the visier to Sarkin Zinari, He was disgraced by Sarki Abdurahman when he was sent with marriage proposal. He remained loyal to his emir unlike the visier of Sarki Abdurahman.

== See also ==
- Abubakar Imam
- Ruwan Bagaja
- Northern Nigerian Publishing Company Limited
- Hausa language

== Bibliography ==
- Furniss, Graham (1996). Poetry, prose and popular culture in Hausa. International African Institute. Edinburgh: Edinburgh University Press for the International African Institute. ISBN 978-1-4744-6829-9
- Muhammad, Abdulwahab (2015). A Semantic Analysis of Lexical Devices in Abubakar Imam Magana Jari Ce (1. Aufl ed.). Saarbrücken. ISBN 978-3-639-86078-8.
