= Northern Region, Nigeria =

Former autonomous division within Nigeria

Coordinates: 10°31′N 7°26′E

Northern Nigeria Arewacin Najeriya (Hausa)
- 1897–1967
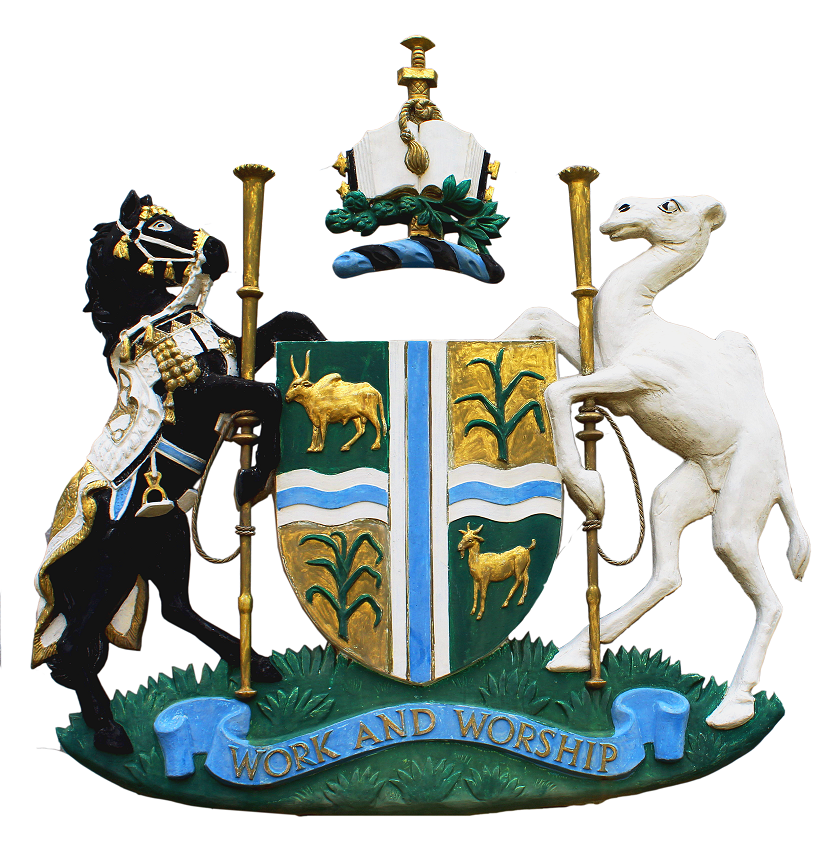
- Flag Coat of arms
- Motto: Aiki da Ibada "Work and Worship"
- Anthem: National Anthem of Northern Nigeria
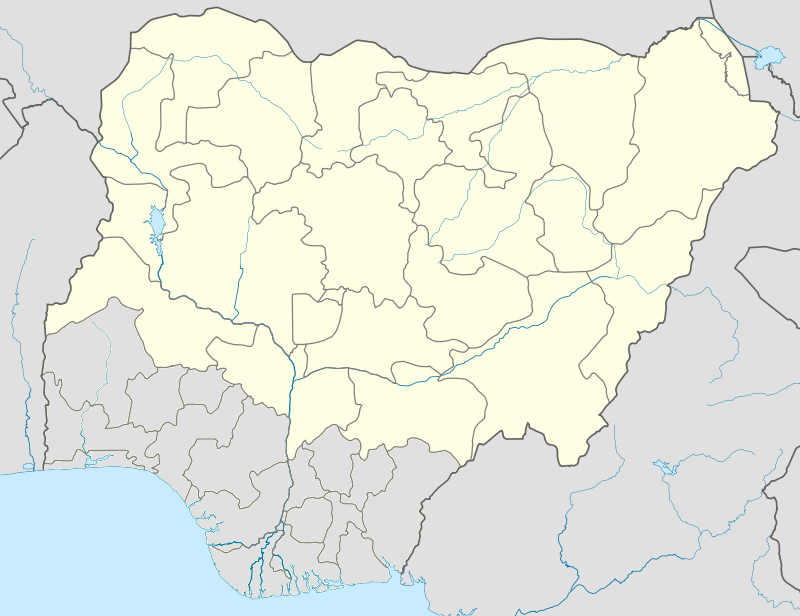
- Capital: Lokoja (1897–1903); Zungeru (1903–1923); Kaduna (1923–1966)
- Largest city: Kano
- Official languages: Hausa language
- Major languages: Hausa; Fulani; Kanuri; Yoruba
- Government: Constitutional Monarchy (1897–1963); Federation (1963–1966)
  - Governors: Sir Kashim Ibrahim
  - Premier of Northern Nigeria: Sir Ahmadu Bello
- Legislature: Northern Regional Legislature
  - Upper house: House of Chiefs
  - Lower house: House of Assembly

Establishment
- History
  - Proclamation of Protectorate: 1897
  - Independence: 15 March 1953
  - Republic declared: 1 October 1963
  - Established: 1897
  - Disestablished: 1967

Area
  - Total: 660,000 km^{2} (250,000 sq mi)

Population
  - Estimate: 120,000,000
  - 1950 census: 6,383,682
Preceded by	Succeeded by
Northern Nigeria Protectorate	Federation of Nigeria
- Today part of: Nigeria

Northern Nigeria (or Arewancin Nijeriya) was an autonomous division within Nigeria, distinctly different from the southern part of the country, with independent customs, foreign relations and security structures. In 1962, it acquired the territory of the British Northern Cameroons, which voted to become a province within Northern Nigeria.

In 1967, Northern Nigeria was divided into the North-Eastern State, North-Western State, Kano State, Kaduna State, Kwara State, and the Benue-Plateau State, each with its own Governor.

Today, the term is still loosely used to describe the Northern part of the country, still made up of the former regions geographical area.

== History ==
=== Prehistory ===
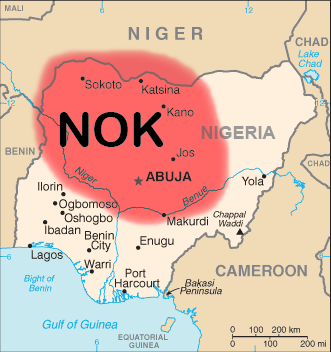
Area of the Nok culture

The Nok culture, an ancient culture dominated most of what is now Northern Nigeria in prehistoric times, its legacy in the form of terracotta statues and megaliths have been discovered in Sokoto, Kano, Birinin Kudu, Nok and Zaria. The Kwatarkwashi culture, a variant of the Nok culture centred mostly around Zamfara in Sokoto Province is thought by some to be the same or an offshoot of the Nok.

=== The Fourteen Kingdoms ===
The Fourteen Kingdoms unified the diverse lore and heritage of Northern Nigeria into a cohesive ethno-historical system. Seven of these kingdoms developed from the Kabara legacy of the Hausa people. In the 9th century as vibrant trading centers competing with Kanem-Bornu and Mali slowly developed in the Central Sudan, a collection of kingdoms merged – the Hausa Kingdoms or Hausa Bakwai – dominating the great savannah plains of Hausaland. Their primary exports were leather, gold, cloth, salt, kola nuts, animal hides, and henna.

The seven Hausa states included:

- Daura, ? – 1806
- Kano, 998 – 1807
- Katsina, c. 1400 – 1805
- Zazzau (Zaria), c. 1200 – 1808
- Gobir, ? – 1808
- Rano
- Biram, c. 1100 – 1805

The growth and conquest of the Hausa Bakwai resulted in the founding of additional states with rulers tracing their lineage to a concubine of the Hausa founding father, Bayajidda. Thus, they are called the Banza Bakwai, meaning Bastard Seven. The Banza Bakwai adopted many of the customs and institutions of the Hausa Bakwai but were considered unsanctioned or copy-cat kingdoms by non-Hausa people. These states include:

- Zamfara
- Kebbi
- Yauri (also called Yawuri)
- Gwari (also called Gwariland)
- Kwararafa (a Jukun state)
- Nupe mainly where is presently called Niger State (of the Nupe people)

=== Hausa States ===
Between 500 and 700, Hausa people, who are thought to have slowly moved from Nubia and mixing in with the local Northern population, established a number of strong states in what is now Northern Nigeria and Eastern Niger. With the decline of the Nok and Sokoto, who had previously controlled Central and Northern Nigeria between 800 BCE and 200, the Hausa were able to emerge as the new power in the region. They are closely linked with the Kanuri people of Kanem-Bornu (Lake Chad), the Birom, Gwari, Nupe and Jukun.

The Hausa aristocracy, under influence from the Mali Empire adopted Islam in the 11th century. By the 12th century, the Hausa were becoming one of Africa's major powers. The architecture of the Hausa is perhaps one of the least known but most beautiful of the medieval age. Many of their early mosques and palaces are bright and colourful and often include intricate engraving or elaborate symbols designed into the facade. By 1500, the Hausa utilized a modified Arabic script known as Ajami to record their own language; the Hausa compiled several written histories, the most popular being the Kano Chronicle.

=== Fulani Empire and Bornu Empire ===
Usman Dan Fodio, the 18th century revolutionary and a social, religious and political reformer finally united the seven Hausa States with newly created provinces into the Sokoto Caliphate. The Sokoto Caliphate was under the overall authority of the Commander of the Faithful. Under Dan Fodio, the Empire was bicephalous and divided into two territories each controlled by an appointed vizier. Each of the territories was further divided into autonomous Emirates under mainly hereditary local Emirs. The Bornu Empire was initially absorbed into the Sokoto Caliphate of Usman dan Fodio but broke away a few years later.

=== Colonisation ===
Initially, the British involvement in Northern Nigeria was predominantly trade-related and revolved around the expansion of the Royal Niger Company, whose interior territories spread north from about where the Niger River and Benue River joined at Lokoja the Mount Patti hill. The Royal Niger Company's territory did not represent a direct threat to much the Sokoto Caliphate or the numerous states of Northern Nigeria. This changed, when Frederick Lugard and Taubman Goldie laid down an ambitious plan to pacify the Niger interior and unite it with the rest of the British Empire.

==== History of the Protectorate of Northern Nigeria ====
The protectorate of Northern Nigeria was proclaimed at Ida by Frederick Lugard on 1 January 1897. The basis of the protectorate was the 1885 Treaty of Berlin which broadly granted Northern Nigeria to the British sphere of influence, on the basis of their existing protectorates in Southern Nigeria. Hostilities with the powerful Sokoto Caliphate soon followed. the Emirates of Kontagora and Ilorin were the first to be conquered by the British. In February 1903, the great fort of Kano, seat of the Kano Emirate was captured, Sokoto and much of the rest of its Caliphate soon capitulated.

On 13 March 1903, the Grand Shura of Caliphate finally conceded to Lugard's demands and proclaimed Queen Victoria as suzerain of the Caliphate and all its lands.

Governor Lugard, with limited resources, controlled the region with the consent of local rulers through a policy of indirect rule, which he developed into a sophisticated political theory. The geographical area included in the Northern Nigeria Protectorate included the Okun-Yoruba land of Kabba, Ogidi, Ijumu, Gbede, Yagba, as well as Ebira land, Igala land fashioned collectively under Kabba Province. The Ifelodun, Offa, Omuaran, Ifelodun and Irepodun areas, also Yorubas, were fashioned into Ilorin province. Lugard left the protectorate after some years, serving in Hong Kong, but was eventually returned to work in Nigeria, where in 1914 he sought the merger of the Northern Nigeria Protectorate with Southern Nigeria, creating the Colony and Protectorate of Nigeria.

Agitation for independence from the radically different Southern Protectorate, however, led to a formidable split in the 1940s. The Richards constitution proclaimed in 1945, gave overwhelming autonomy to the North, including eventually in the areas of foreign relations and customs policy.

The Protectorate of Northern Nigeria was established by the British colonial administration in 1900, marking a significant chapter in Nigeria's colonial history. This entity encompassed the predominantly Muslim and Hausa-Fulani dominated regions of the north, distinct from the southern territories under direct British rule. The British aimed to consolidate control over the diverse regions of Nigeria, leveraging indirect rule through traditional Hausa rulers and Emirs. This strategy aimed to maintain stability while extracting resources for British interests. The Protectorate of Northern Nigeria evolved through administrative reforms and faced challenges such as resistance to colonial rule and socio-economic transformations.

=== Independence ===
Northern Nigeria gained self-government on 15 March 1957 with Sir Ahmadu Bello as its first premier. the Northern Peoples Congress under Bello dominated parliament while the Northern Elements Progressive Union became the main opposition party.

In 1967, Northern Nigeria was disestablished by subdivision.

== Government, civic education and politics ==
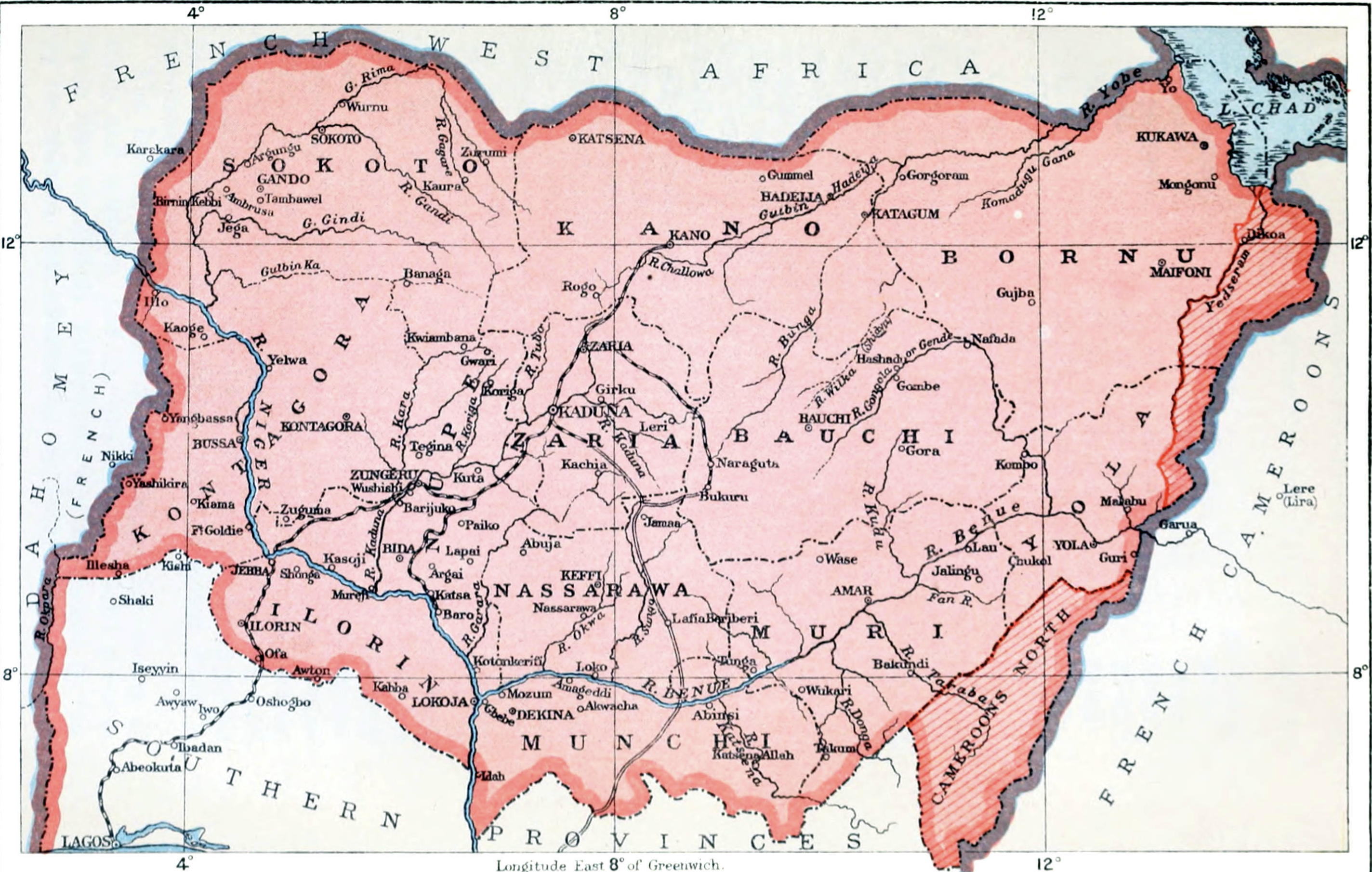
1922 map the region showing its provinces

The government of Northern Nigeria was modelled after the Westminster system. A premier acted as head of government and presided over the day-to-day affairs of government, while a Governor of Northern Nigeria acted as viceroy and as commander-in-chief of the constabulary.

The lower house of parliament, called the House of Assembly was composed of elected representatives from the various provinces of the country. The Upper House of parliament, called the House of Chiefs, was similar to the British House of Lords, composed of unelected emirs of the various Native Authority Councils of the nation's provinces.

In 1967, the Federal Military Government of General Yakubu Gowon broke up the four regions that until then had constituted the Federation of Nigeria, creating twelve new states. Northern Nigeria was divided into the North-Eastern State, North-Western State, Kano State, Kaduna State, Kwara State, and the Benue-Plateau State, each with its own Governor and government.

=== Governor ===
The High Commissioner or Governor of Northern Nigeria, originally the High Commissioner of the Northern Nigeria Protectorate, after 1914 the Lieutenant Governor, Chief Commissioner, or Governor-General of the Northern Provinces of Nigeria, was effectively the viceroy of Northern Nigeria, exercising British suzerainty as representative of the Crown.

The office of High Commissioner was first established on 1 January 1897, by letters patent from Queen Victoria. After the departure of the British in 1960, a Governor continued to be appointed until 1967 as representative of the new administration in Lagos.

The governor presided over all ceremonial functions and appointed the members of the nation's upper legislative house, the Northern Nigerian House of Chiefs.

=== President of the House of Chiefs ===
- Alhaji Haruna, CMG, Emir of Gwandu

=== Speakers of the House of Assembly ===
- Richard Dohew, 1954 - ?
- Alhajia' Umarure Gwandupe

== Geography ==
The highest point in Northern Nigeria is Chappal Waddi at 2,419 m (7,936 ft), which is located at gasha gumti Taraba state. The main rivers are the Niger and the Benue River which converge at Kabba province from where it travels southwards ultimately emptying into the Atlantic Ocean.

The expansive valleys of the Niger and Benue River valleys dominate the southern areas of the region. To the southeast of the Benue river, hills and mountains which forms the Mambilla Plateau create the highest plateau in Northern Nigeria with 1350 above sea level. This plateau extends to the border with Cameroon, this montane land forms part of the Bamenda Highlands in Cameroon.

The great savanna belt of the Great Plains of Hausaland dominates much of the rest of the province. this region experiences rainfall between 20 and 60 inches (508 and 1,524 mm) per year. The savanna zone's three categories are Guinean forest-savanna mosaic, Sudan savanna, and Sahel savanna. Guinean forest-savanna mosaic is plains of tall grass which are interrupted by trees. Sudan savanna is similar but with shorter grasses and shorter trees. Sahel savanna consists of patches of grass and sand, found in the northeast. In the Sahel region, rain is less than 20 inches (508 mm) per year and the Sahara Desert is encroaching. In the dry north-east corner of the country lies Lake Chad, which Northern Nigeria shares with Niger, Chad and Cameroon.

The South Western part of the region included Ogidi, Iyamoye, Iyara that have deep forests inter spacing the guinea savannah areas (and borders the forested areas of southern protectorate and as such shared similar rain patterns and given to the cultivation of cash crops such as coffee and cocoa).

== Subdivisions ==
Northern Nigeria was divided into thirteen provinces:

1. Bauchi
2. Benue
3. Borno
4. Kano
5. Katsina
6. Plateau
7. Kaduna
8. Niger
9. Adamawa
10. Zaria
11. Kiru
12. Sokoto
13. Kabba
14. Ilorin

Kano, the largest of the provinces in terms of population and economy, is in the North-Central part of the country. The Kano Native Authority, an offshoot of the fula Kano Emirate, inherited the ancient trade industries that fuelled the trans-Saharan trade with North Africa.

The Province of Zaria is home to the City of Kaduna, an autonomous capital city that serves as the nation's capital and home to its national institutions.

== Economy ==
Groundnut and cotton industries in the province of Kano provided the main source of revenue for Northern Nigeria. Tin mining in the Province of Plateau, Steel mining in the Province of Benue, and other metal industries in the Province of Sokoto, built up the diverse mining industry of the region.

Cement industries in Sokoto, Bauchi and Ashaka cement at Gombe (present day Funakaye LGA) other processing industries in Kano constituted the main manufacturing sector. And also, irrigation plant at Dadin Kowa Dam in Gombe State (present day Gombe State).

== Demographics ==
Northern Nigeria though an ethnically and religiously diverse region, is an overwhelmingly majority Muslim region. The Hausa, Fulani and Kanuri dominate much of the North Western and Eastern part of the country while the Yoruba, Nupe, Tiv, Igala and Idoma are dominant in the North Central. Hausa, Fulani, Nupe and the Kanuri people are chiefly Muslims.

A small part of the Hausa population also adheres to the ancient religion of Hausa Animism.

Small Christian populations also exist in the north, mostly in the North Central, they were converted to Christianity after the colonisation of the country by the British.

=== Human rights concerns ===
With fighting on both sides, there have been attacks by Fulani herdsmen on villages in the North resulting in 6000 deaths since 2015, and Christian farmers have murdered Fulani and their livestock.

== See also ==
- States of Nigeria
- Culture of Northern Nigeria
- Middle Belt
