= Gobarau Minaret =

Tower in Katsina, Nigeria

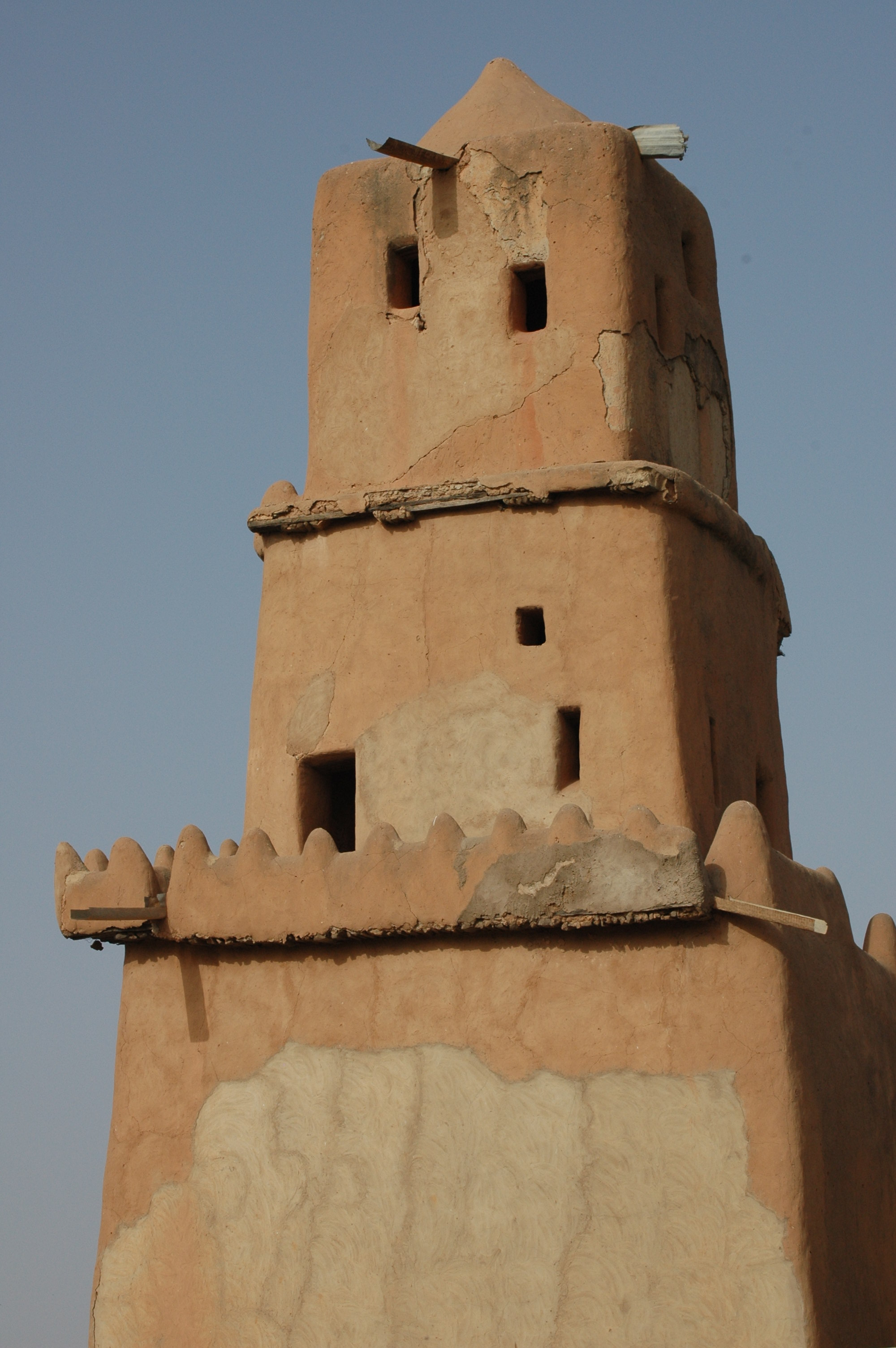

- Location of the minaret in Nigeria

Religion
- Affiliation: Islam (former)
- Ecclesiastical or organizational status: Mosque (as the Gobarau Mosque) (15th–19th centuries)
- Status: Abandoned (Minaret preserved)

Location
- Location: Katsina, Katsina State
- Country: Nigeria
- Interactive map of Gobarau Minaret
- Coordinates: 12°59′53″N 7°35′44″E

Architecture
- Type: Mosque
- Style: Hausa; Sudano-Sahelian
- Founder: Sheikh Muhammad Abdulkarim Almaghili
- Completed: 15th century CE
- Demolished: 19th century CE

Specifications
- Minaret: 1
- Minaret height: 15 m (50 ft)

The Gobarau Minaret (var. Gobirau, Goborau) is a 15-metre-tall (50 ft) minaret located in the center of the city of Katsina, northern Nigeria. As an early example of Hausa Muslim architecture in a city known as a theological center, the tower has become a symbol of the city.

== History ==
The Gobarau Minaret (in Hausa, Hasumiyya) is a 15-metre-tall (50 ft) edifice located in the center of the city of Katsina, the capital of Katsina State. The minaret is part of a former mosque that was built in the 15th century during the reign of Sarkin (King) Katsina, Muhammadu Korau (1445–1495) who was the first Muslim ruler of the ancient Kingdom of Katsina. The mosque's origin is attributed to the efforts of the influential Islamic scholar Sheikh Muhammad Abdulkarim Almaghili. Almaghili, who was born in Tlemcen in present-day Algeria, he taught for a while in Katsina when he visited the town in the late 15th century during the reign of Muhammadu Korau. The Gobarau Mosque was built to serve as a center for spiritual and intellectual activities. It was inspired by mosques found in the city of Timbuktu at the time.

The mosque was later used also as a madrassa. By the beginning of the 16th century, Katsina had become a very important commercial and academic center in Hausaland, and the Gobarau Mosque had grown into a famed institution of higher Islamic education. The Gobarau Mosque continued to be Katsina's central mosque until the beginning of the 19th century when Sarkin Katsina Ummarun Dallaje (1805–1835) built a new mosque, but was later demolished by Muhammadu Dikko (1906–1944), who built the Masallacin Dutsi (Katsina Grand Central Mosque/Masallacin Juma'a na Kofar Soro), that is in current use.

The former mosque and its minaret were renovated by Sarkin Katsina Muhammadu Kabir Usman (1981–2008). The Gobarau Minaret is a tourist attraction site, along with the Kusugu well in Daura.

== Mythology ==
A popular myth about the origin of Gobarau states that when Muhammadu Korau slew Jibda-Yaki Sanau, the last pagan king of Katsina, he desired to construct a mosque. After the site was selected, there arose the problem of the direction of the Qiblah where the mosque must face. Korau consulted the Muslim scholars of that time, and they all agreed to a certain direction, except one Mallam Jodoma, who was a stranger. An argument broke out, and the other scholars insulted Jodoma of being a stranger who wanted to bring instability. Incensed, Mallam Jodoma pointed his staff at another direction, and there appeared the Ka'abah clearly. The tower was also used for spotting invading armies.

Korau was amazed, and made Mallam Jodoma his chief imam, much to the dismay of the other scholars, who jealously made Korau believe that Jodoma, becoming increasingly famous, wanted his throne. Jodoma was banished from Katsina, and he settled at Guga, a village in present-day Bakori local government, where he died.

== See also ==
- Islam in Nigeria
- List of mosques in Nigeria
