= Gates of Hausa kingdoms =

Hausa architecture

Gates of Hausa kingdoms are gates (Hausa: kofa) or walls (ganuwa) that formerly enclosed the Hausa kingdoms. In ancient times, each kingdom was enclosed with a wall that contained various gates. During battles, the gates were closed as a war strategy. Each gate has a name and a gatekeeper (Sarkin Kofa, lit. "King of the Gate"). In the past, especially at night, the gatekeeper was in charge of a single gate at all time. All of the gates are assigned to a single person today.

== Architectural concept ==
In Hausa Kingdoms, gates were built from mud, dried grass, timber, metals, stones and other traditional building materials suitable for the building. The gates are designed based on Hausa culture and depict Hausa traditional architecture using burn bricks and traditional colors of the Hausa region. On average, the gates reach a height of about five meters with a length of about ten meters. They are illustrated with patterns, marks, symbols and Hausa design, such as a tambarin arewa, a logo frequently used in Hausa buildings which serves as an emblem or flag to Hausa people. When the structure of the gate is completed, the entire gate is painted in a traditional style while some gates are left brownish with the natural color of mud, like the Gate of Marusa in Katsina.

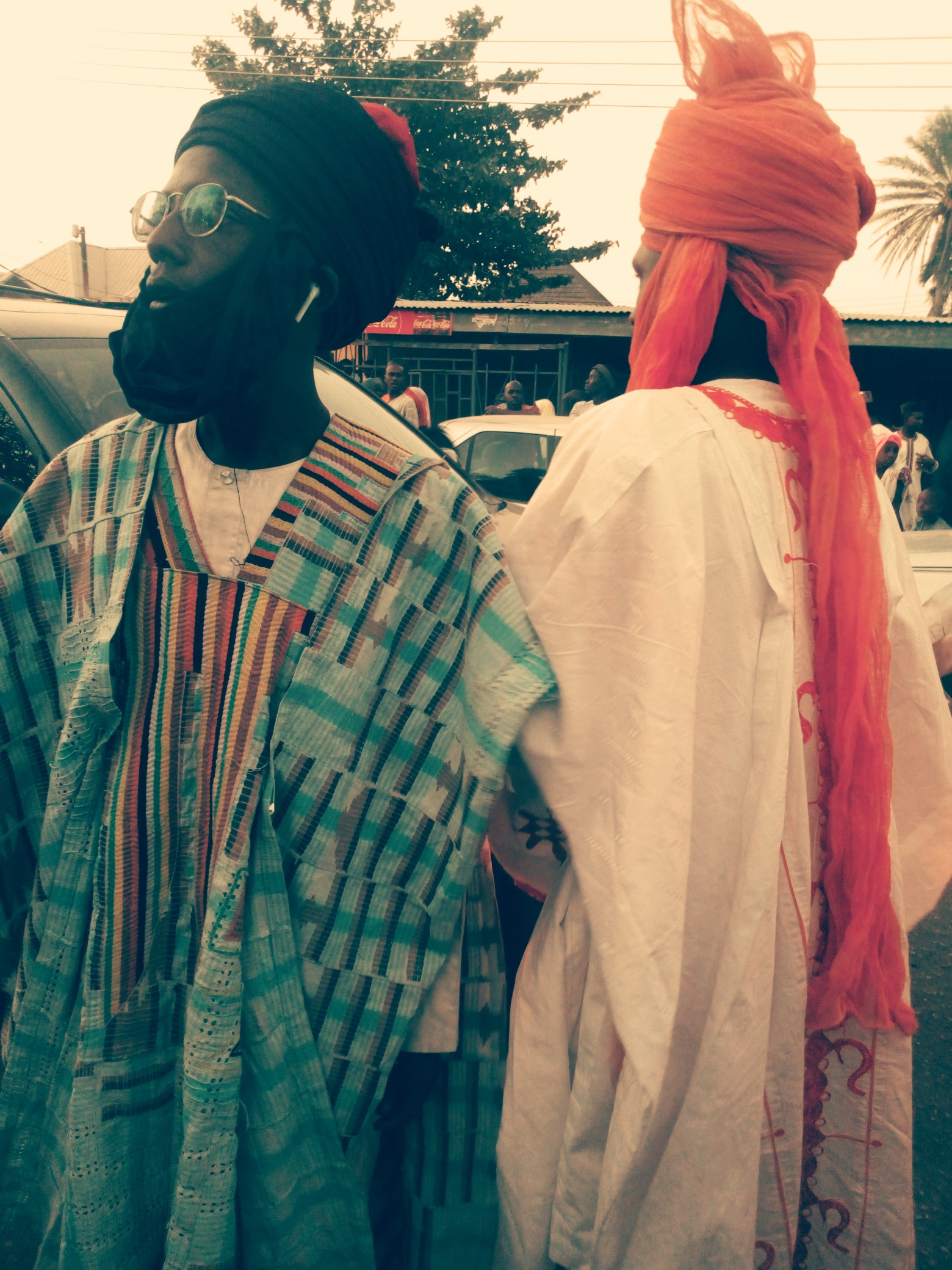
Hausa traditional dressing

== Overview ==
In ancient times, every gate was allocated to one person. It is his duty at all times to protect and maintain it by providing administrative records of every movement of people passing through the gate along with foreign record affairs for self-defense. Every gate has a key for opening and closing; the keys are allocated to Sarkin Kofa. Usually, there is a fixed time for closing and opening of every gate but today the gates are open without the need for keys. Traditionally, during wartime, orders only came from either the emir of the kingdom or his war counselor, the Sarkin yaki'. Out of wartime, orders and control of the gate are left to the Sarkin Kofa. It is an order that entry into the city may only be done through those gates. When the gates are closed at night, they do not reopen until dawn. The post of Sarkin Kofa is inherited generationally in the Hausa Kingdom, from a Sarkin Kofa to his children. The gates also serve as a tourist attraction nowadays in Hausalands.

== Gates ==
=== Bauchi ===
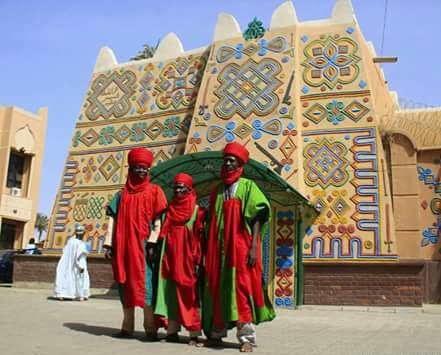
Gate of the palace of Bauchi

In Bauchi Emirate there are nine gates.

- Gate of Inkil: Called the gate of Eid. It was constructed for the people of Inkil town to allow them to enter the city and perform Eid prayers.
- Gate of Dumi: This gate was named after a student of Malam Yakubu called Abdul Dumi, who became the Wambai of Bauchi and an adviser to the emir in the palace.
- Gate of Jahun
- Gate of Nasarawo: This gate was named after a prominent malam called Malam Nasarawo, who lived outside the gate. The emir at that time went through the gate to visit Nasarawo for prayers.
- Gate of Hunti: This gate was built in memory of a Wuntawan warlord (descended from a tribe of Fula people) called Muhmmadu Kusu. As time passed, the word Wuntuwa turned into Hunti.
- Gate of Ran: Ran is a place were the people of Bauchi once made peace. They followed the gate to meet in Ran; after peace was made, the gate earned the name of the place.
- Gate of Tirwun: Turwun is a town where Sarki Yakubu hailed from, so he erected this gate to honor his town and his people.
- Gate of Wambai: When the city of Bauchi was expanded, the emir of that time built another house for his chief adviser known as "Wambai". The house was built in the expanded area together with a gate for coming in and out of the palace to ease his movement. The gate was named after him.
- Gate of Wase: It was the gate of Madaki (of Bauchi) Hasan, who established the town of Wase (today Wase is a Local Government Area in Plateau State). Madaki Hasan is the best discipline of Yakubu, the first Emir of Bauchi.

=== Kano ===
The kingdom Kano has 15 gates. Some of its wall has eroded due to poor maintenance.

- Gate of Kansakali: Built between 1095 and 1135, the Gate of Kansakali was the first city gate to be constructed.
- Gate of Nasarawa
- Gate of Gidan Rumfa: This is the main entrance of Kano palace built by the emir.
- Sabuwar Kofa Gate: Constructed after Kano fell to the British in 1903.
- Gate of Dan Agundi
- Gate of Naisa
- Gate of Gadankaya
- Gate of Dukawiya
- Gate of Kabuga
- Gate of Waika
- Gate of Ruwa
- Gate of Dawanau
- Gate of Wambai
- Gate of Mazugal
- Gate of Mata
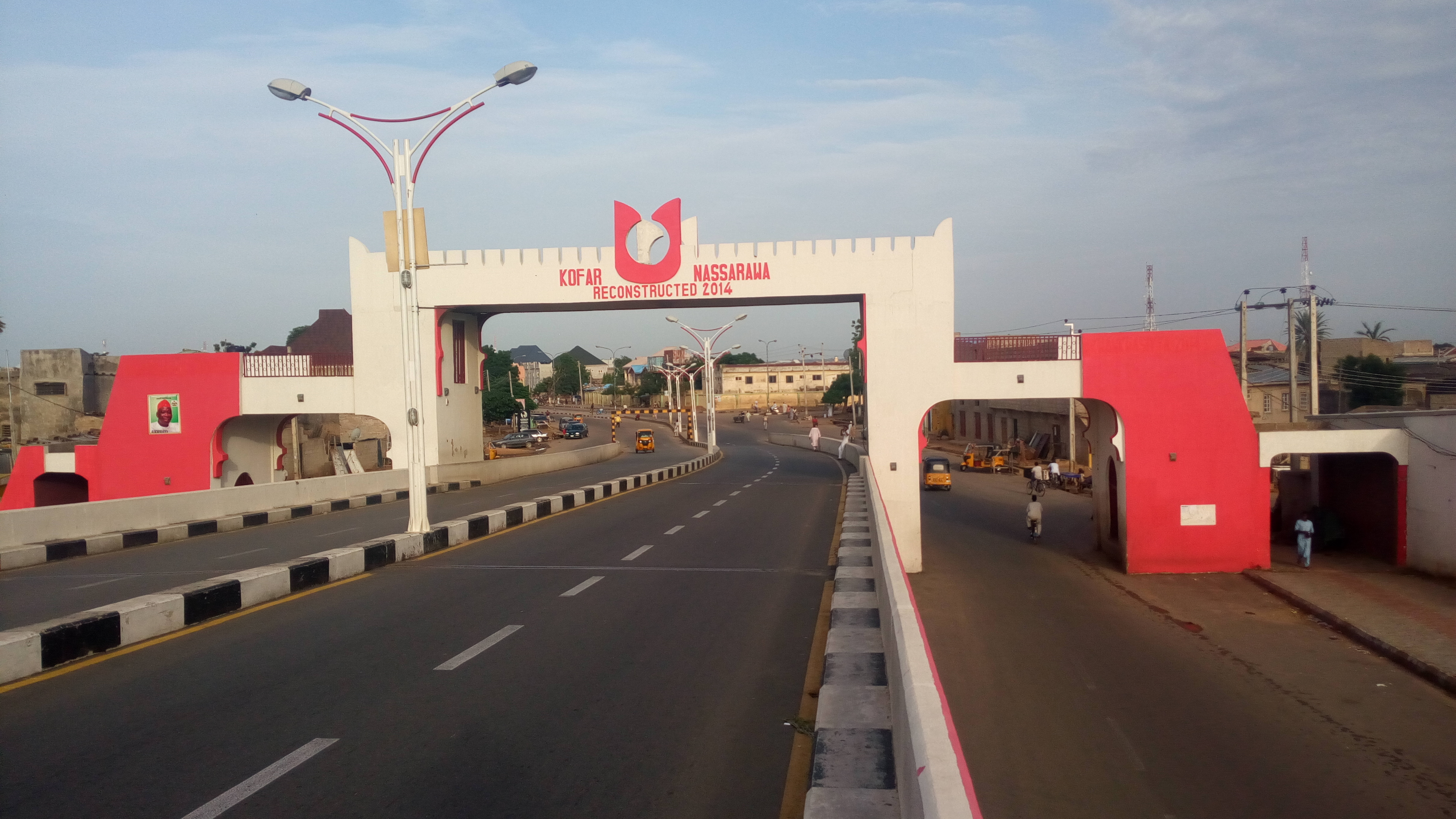
Gate of Nasarawa

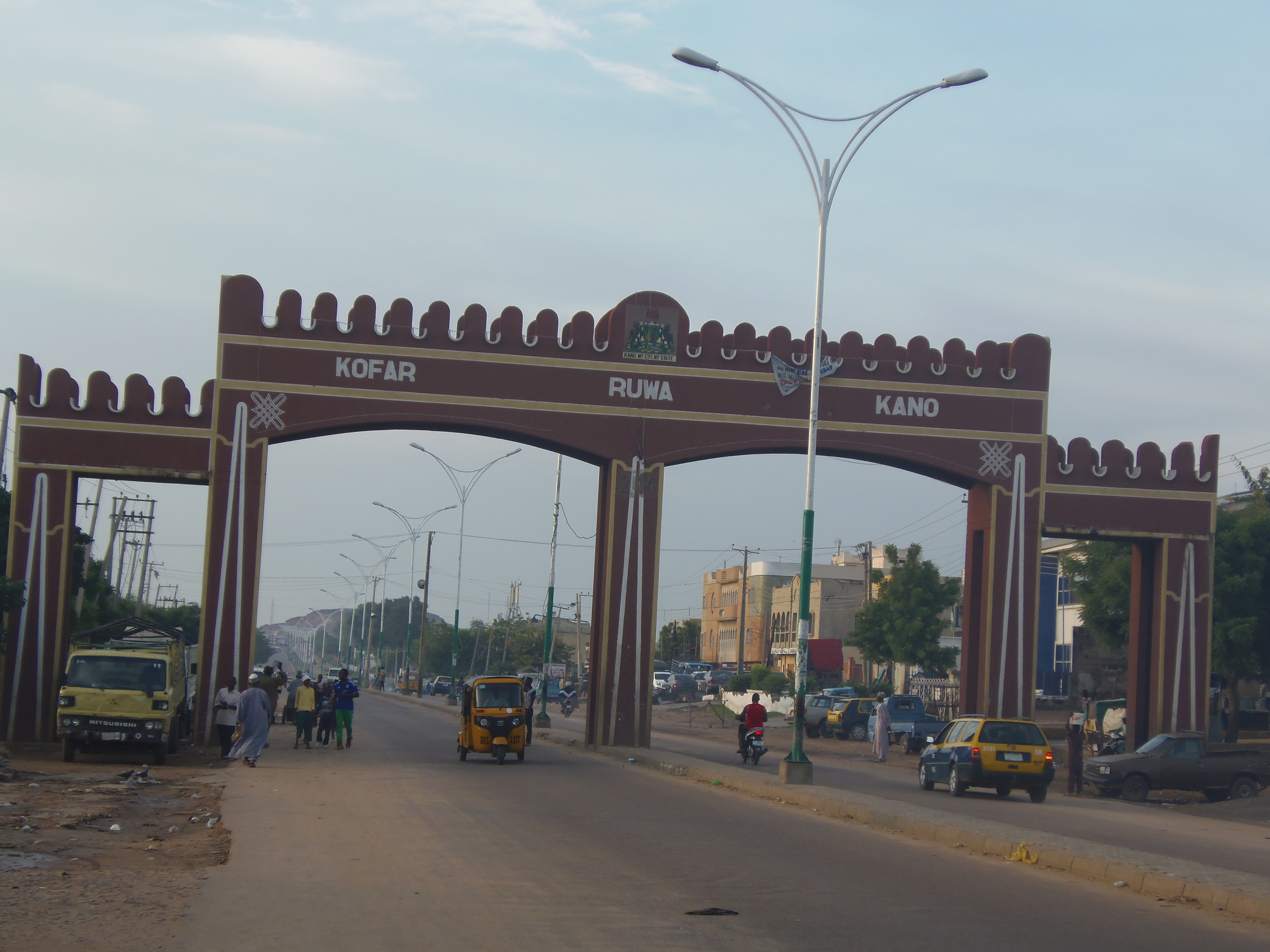
Gate of Ruwa

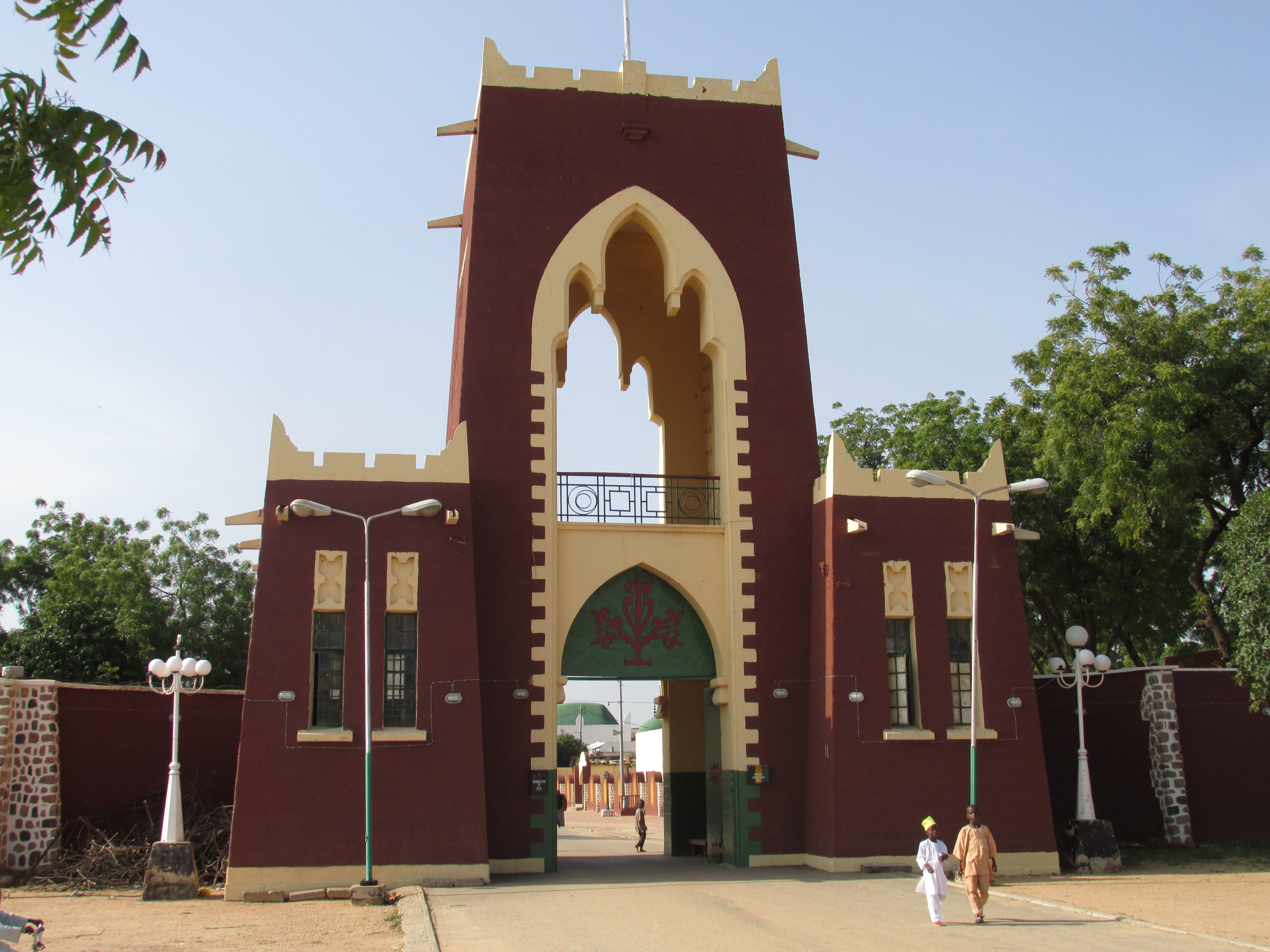
Gate of Rumfa or Fada

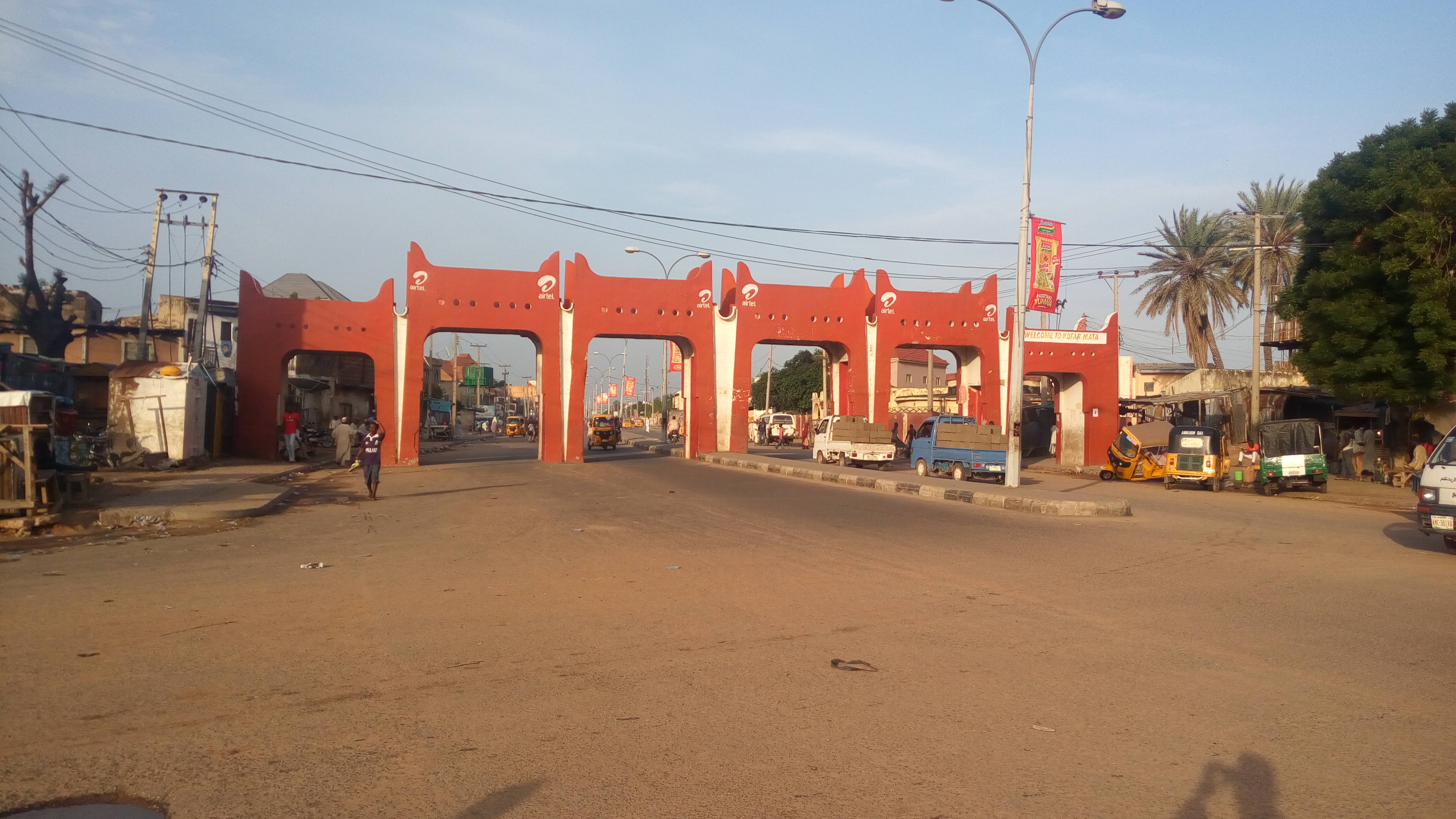
Gate of Mata

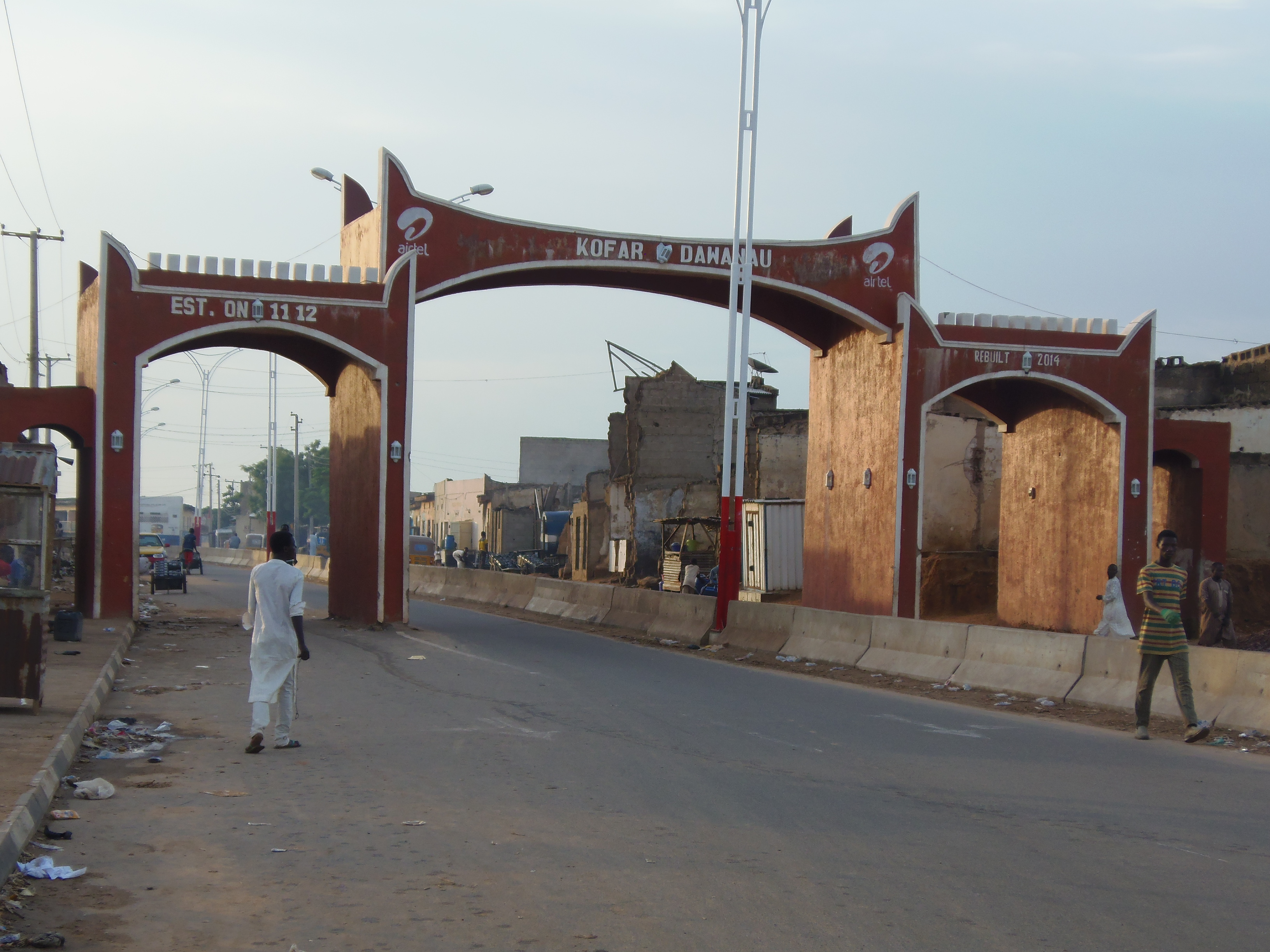
Gate of Dawanau

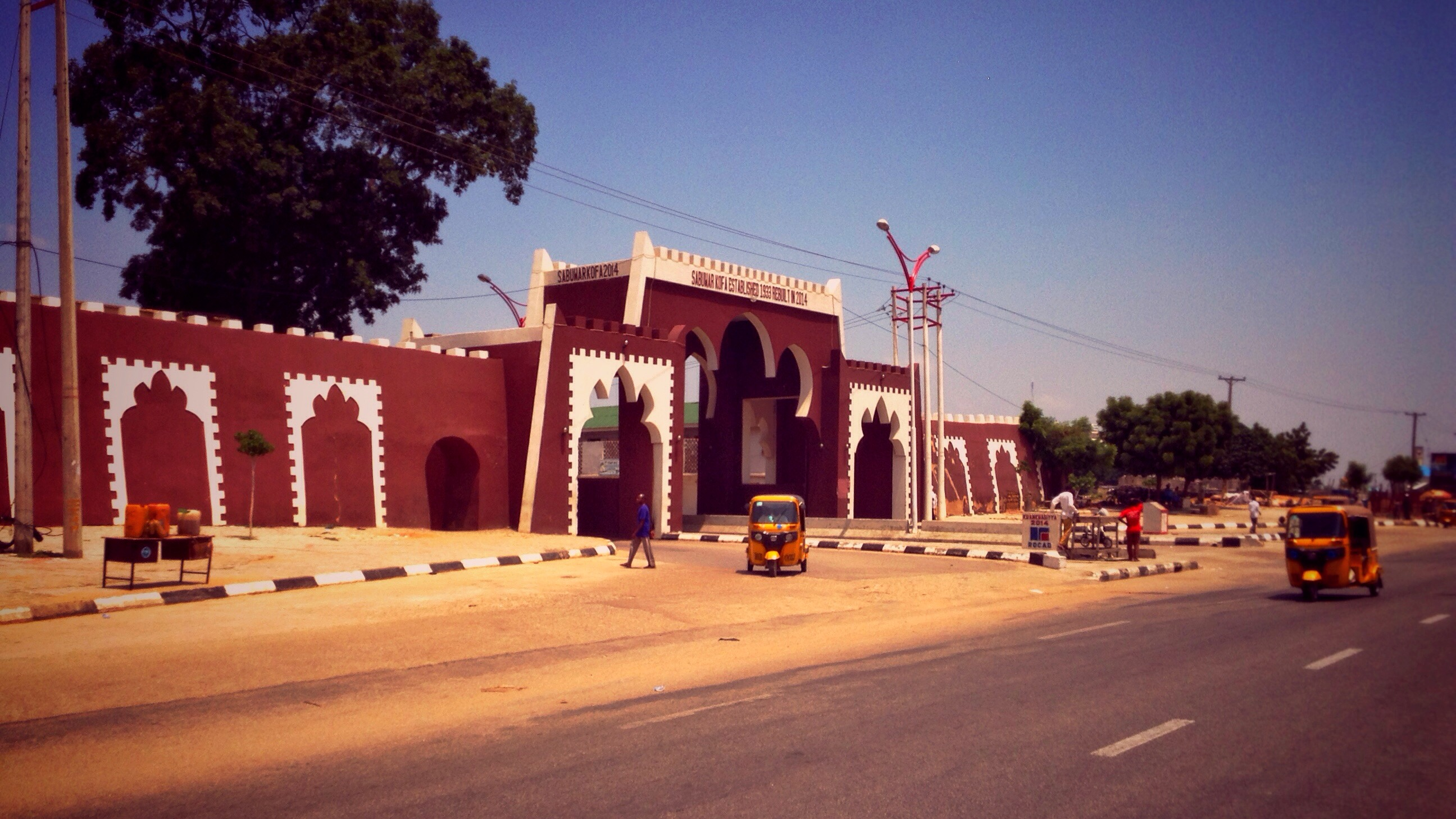
Gate of Sabuwa

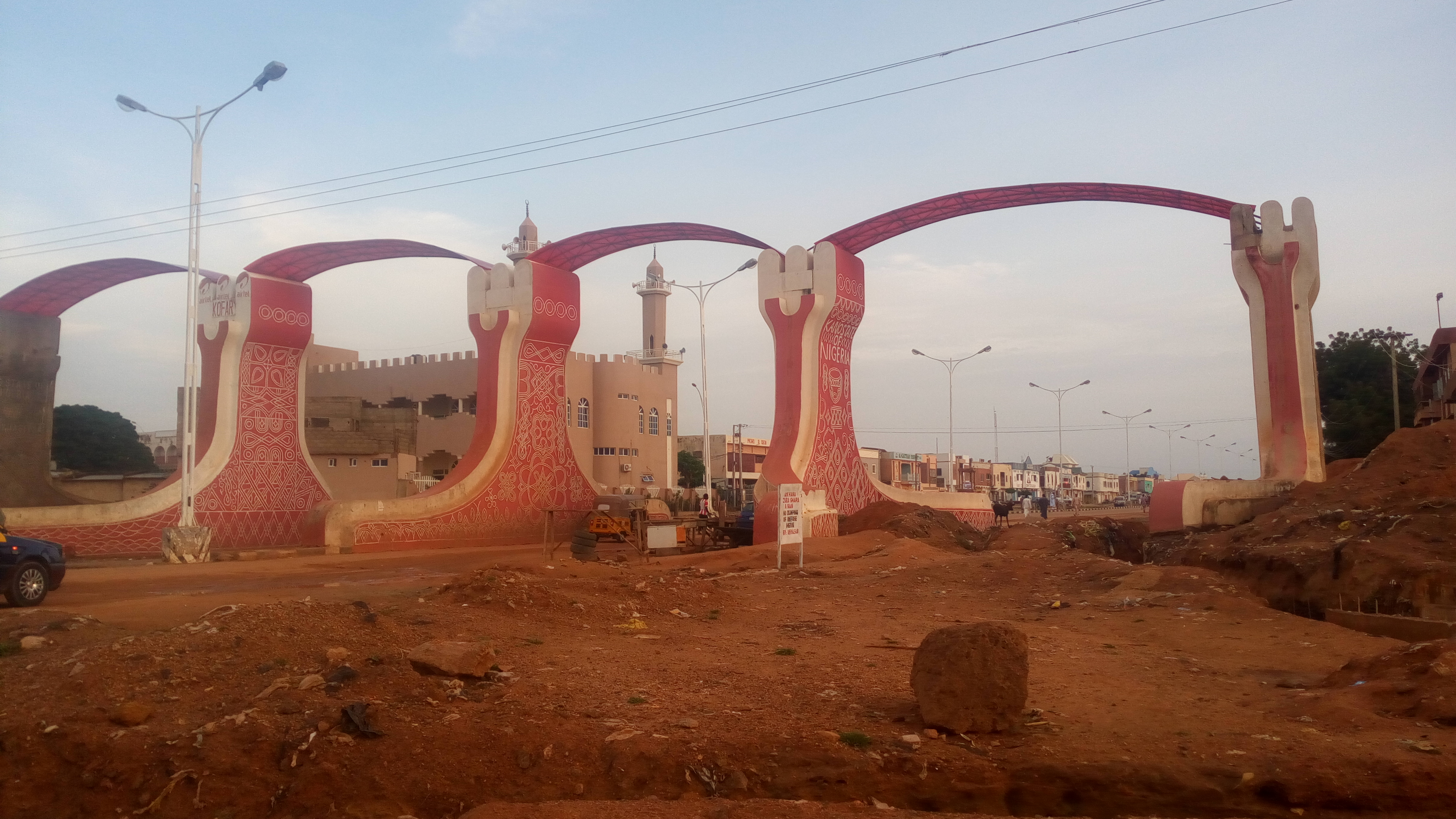
Gate of Gadan Kaya

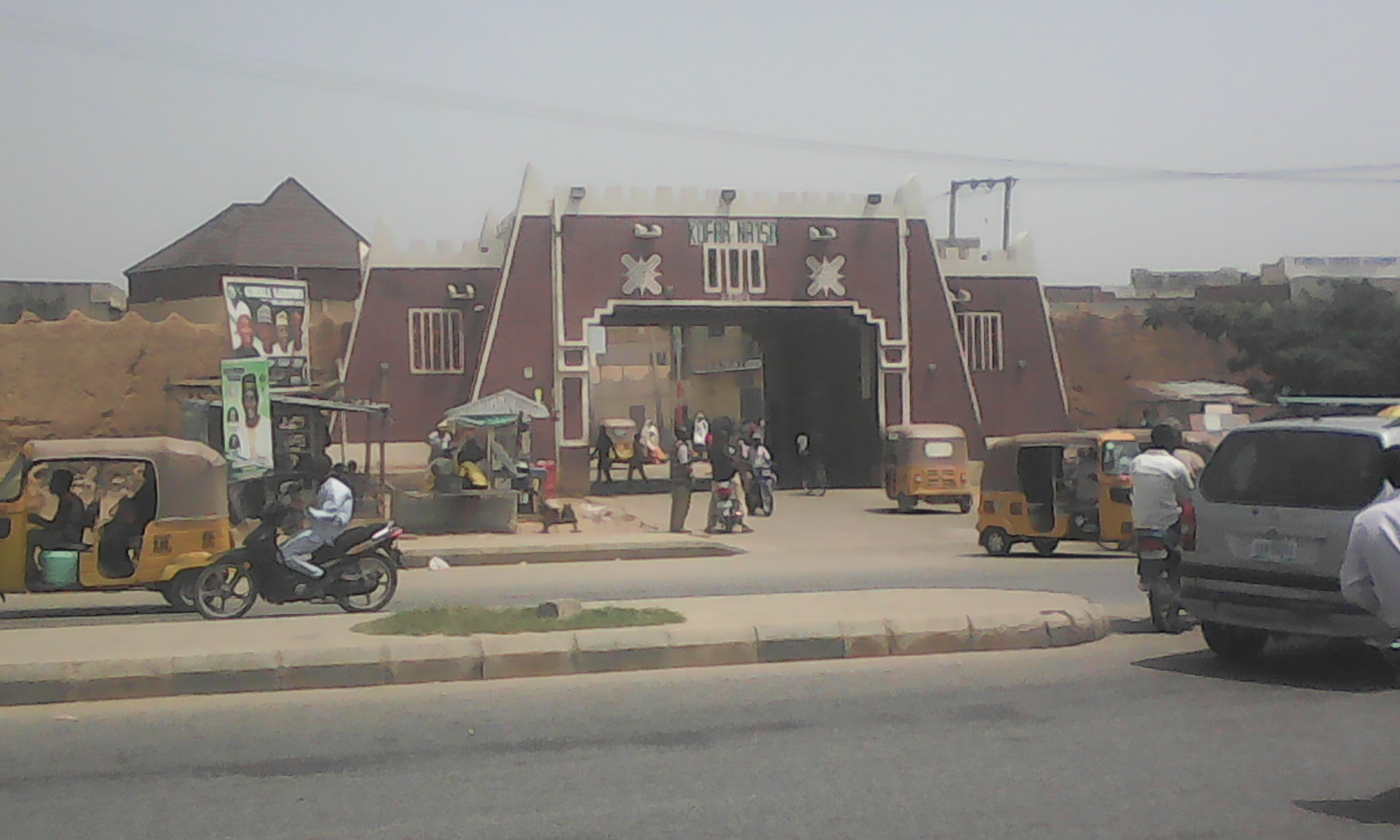
Gate of Nai'sa

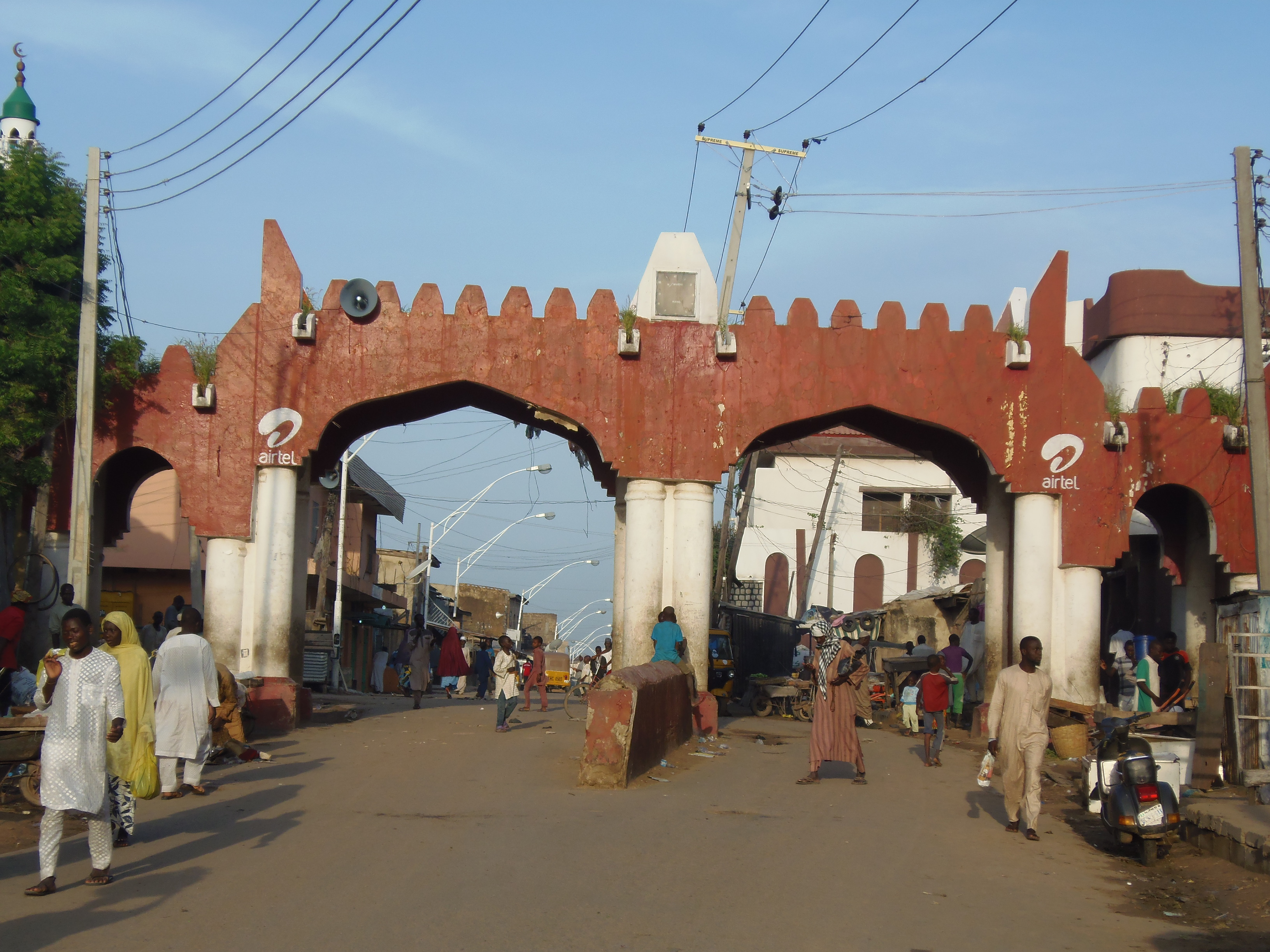
Gate of Wambai

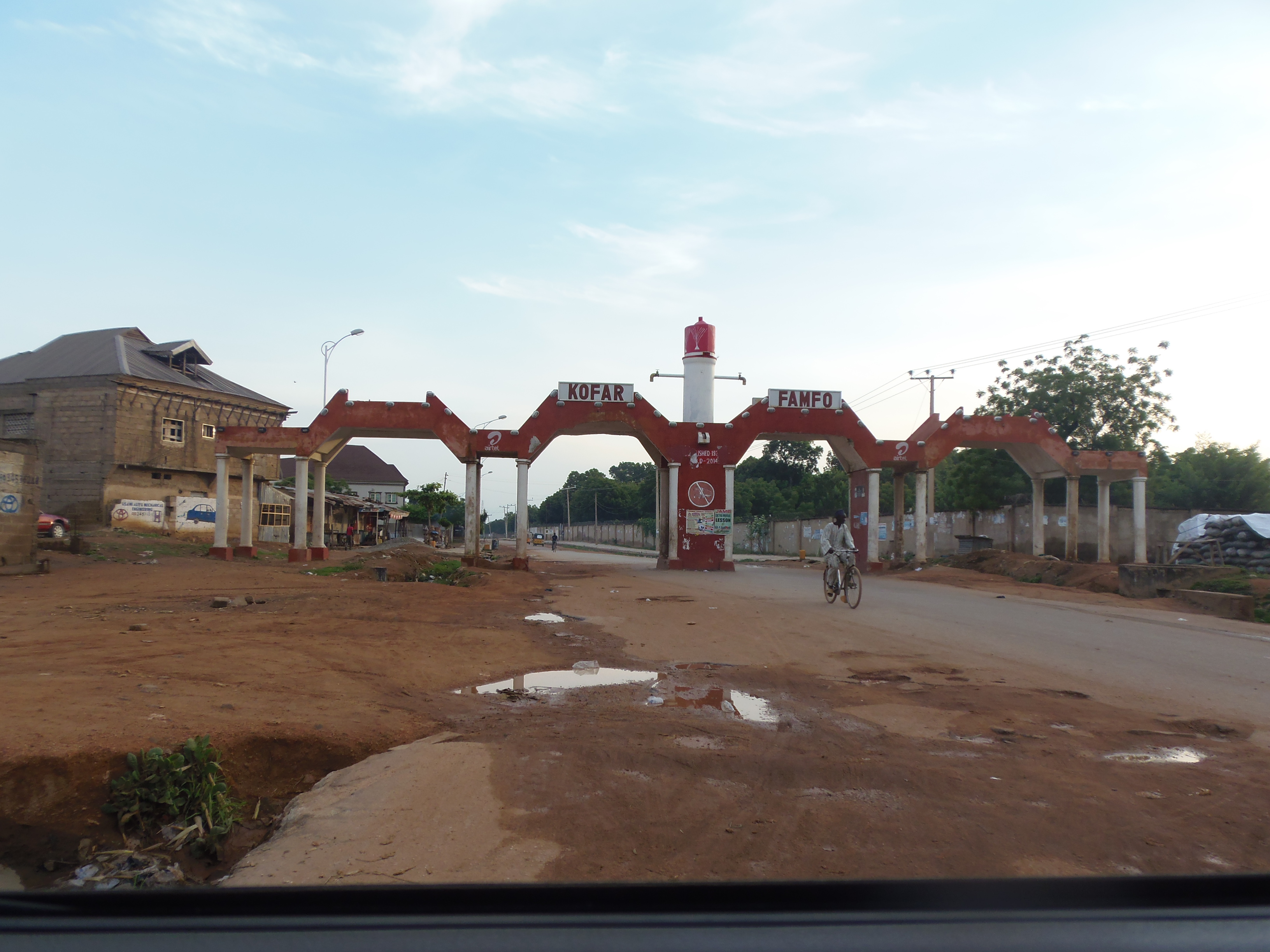
Gate of Famfo

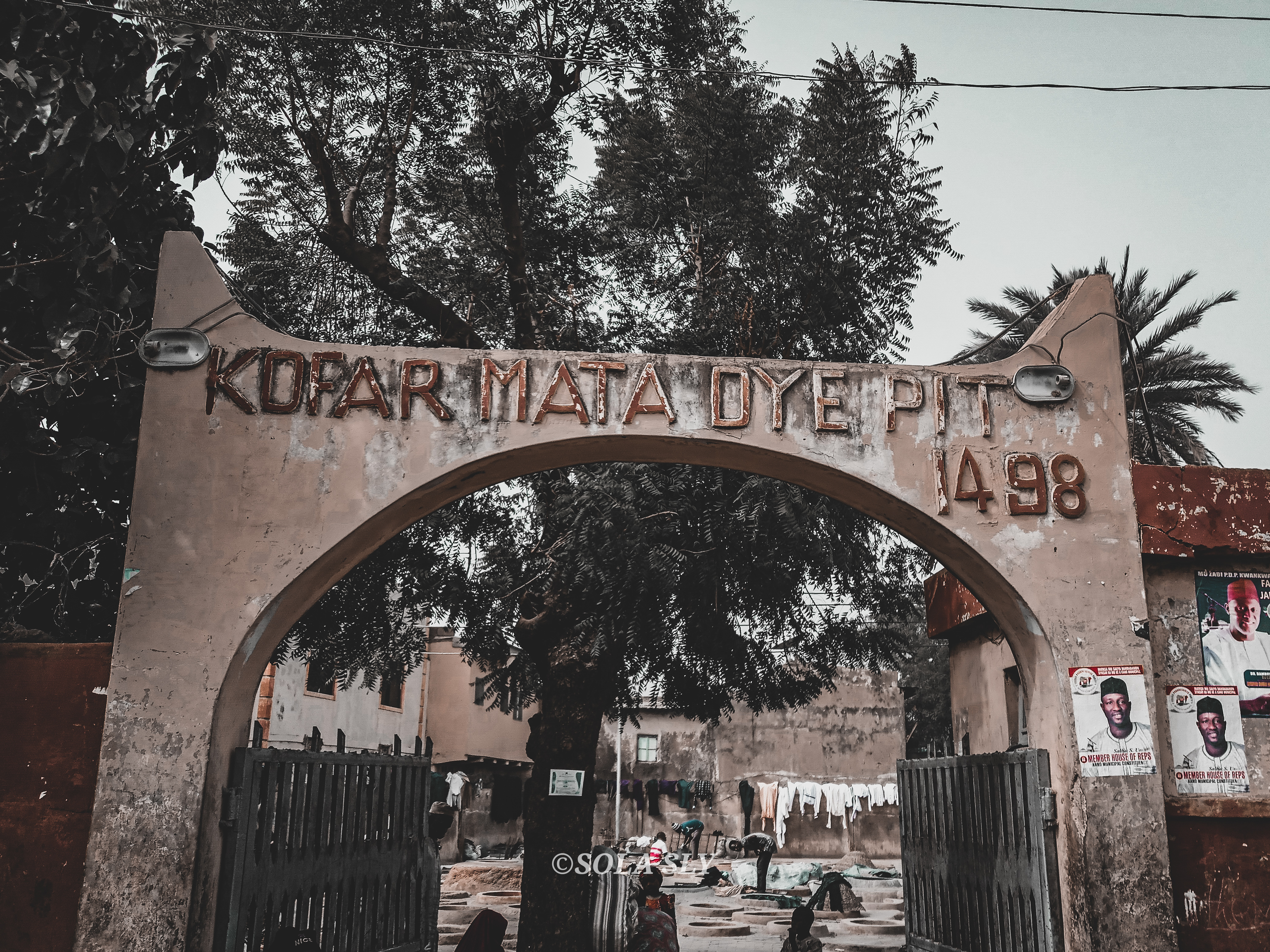
Gate of Mata 1498

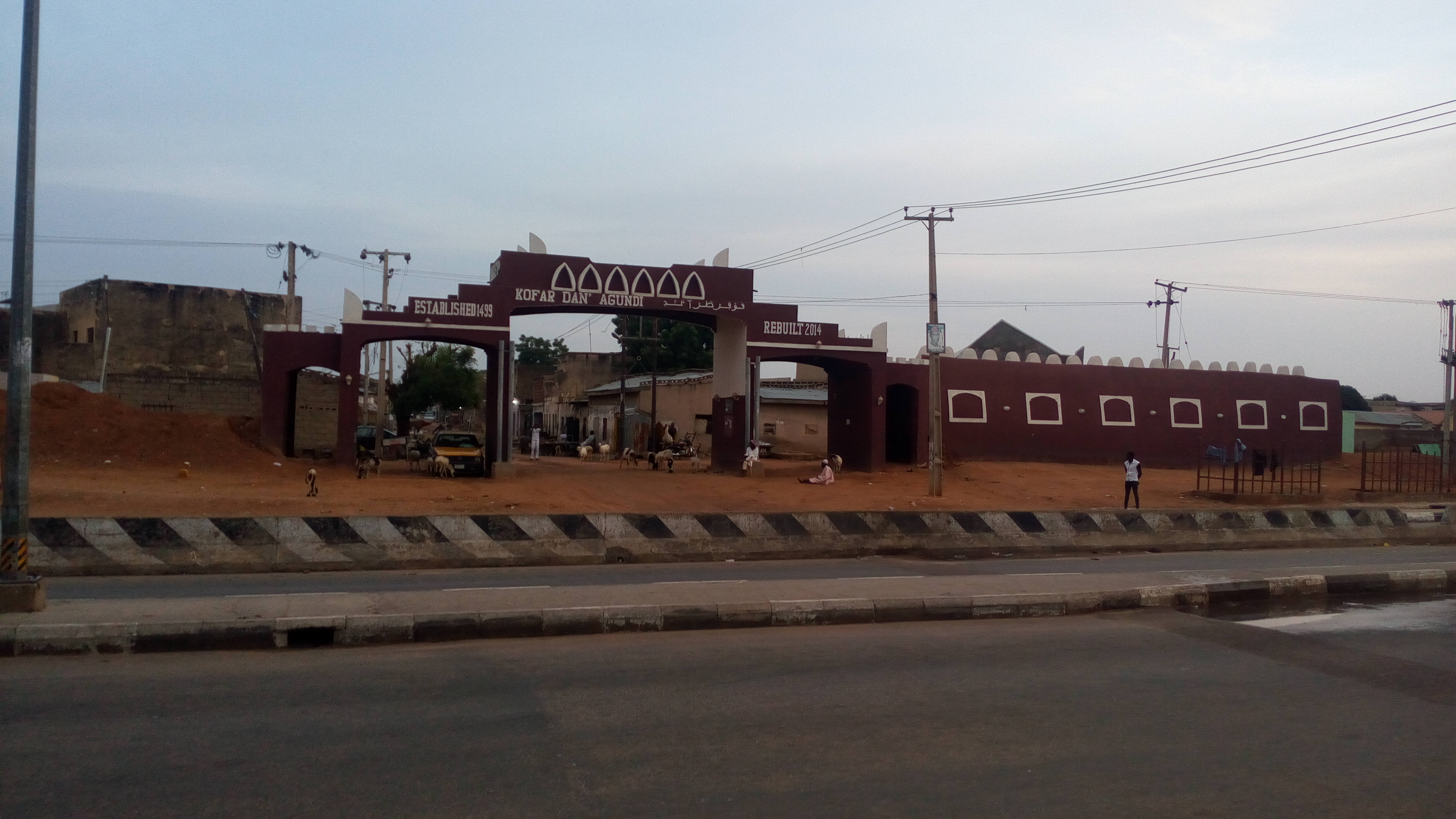
Gate of Dan Agundi

=== Katsina ===
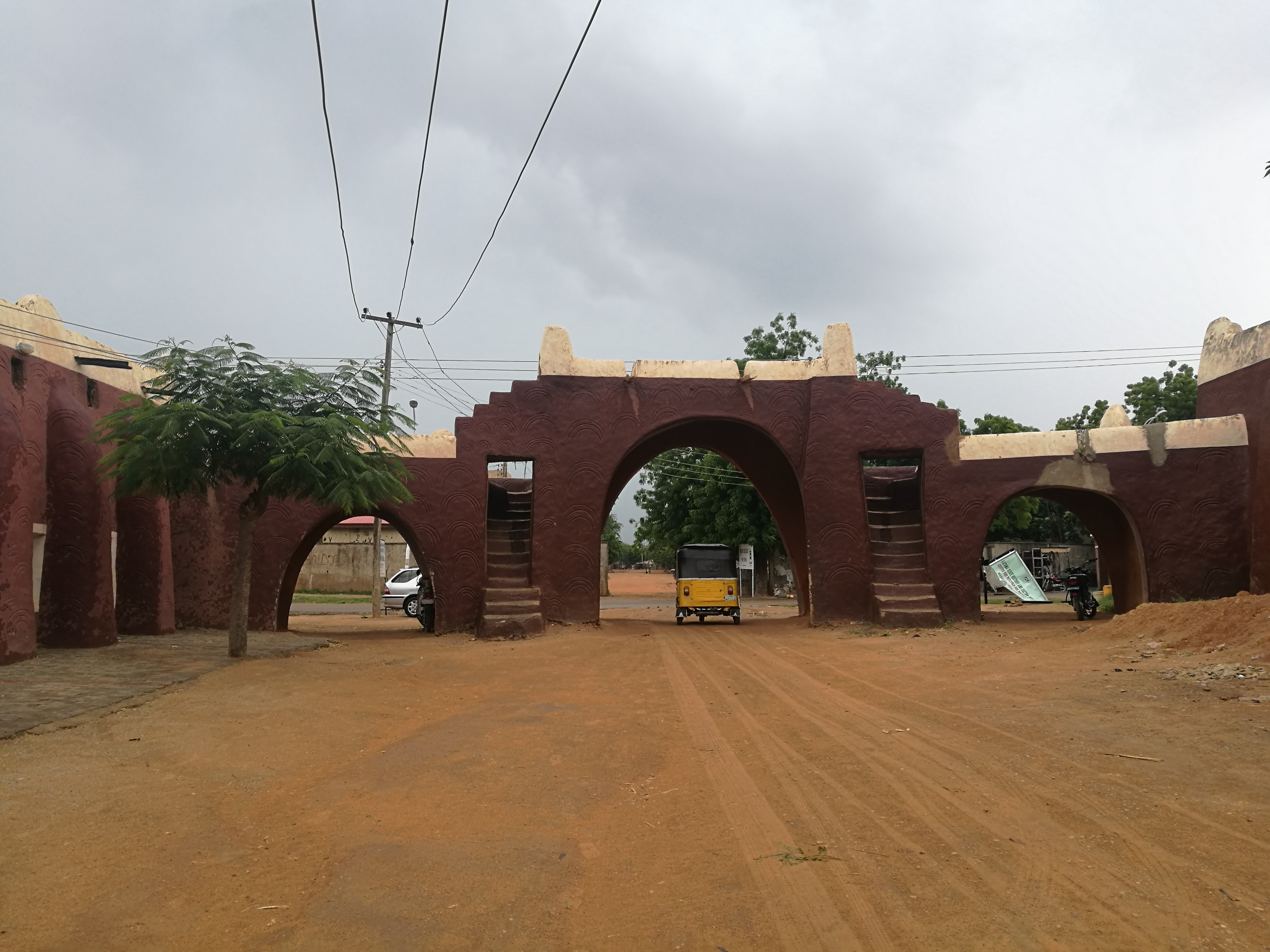
Gate in Katsina

In Katsina, the palace was surrounded by a rampart wall called "Ganuwar Gidan Sarki", which is now gone. The main gate that leads to the palace is called "Kofar Soro", meaning Gate of Soro, while the gate at the backyard of the palace is called Gate of Bai, which is now gone. In the city of Katsina, there are almost 7 gates at every corner of the kingdom. The gates were constructed to enable movement in and out, there are some gates that are no longer in existence, these gates are; The Gate of Turmi, Gate of Keke, Gate of Angulu, Gate of Gazobi and Gate of Waziri.

- Gate of Agulu: This gate has two openings. the word "Agulu" is a name given to the slave of the emir. He is in charge of the Gate and the person in charge of executing people under the death penalty.
- Gate of Keke: This gate was made after the arrival of the colonial Europeans of the British Empire. It is behind the palace of the emir of Katsina. The Europeans used to enter this gate when coming to the palace from their quarters on bicycles; the gate was named after the bicycles, or "Keke" in Hausa.
- Gate of Kwaura: The gate was named after a prominent warrior of Rimi who was given the ruling title of "Kwauran Katsina", which was transferred to the gate.
- Gate of Kwaya: This Gate derives its name from an emir of Habe called Sarkin Kwaya who ruled a small town called Kwaya, which is south of Katsina. The duty of this ruler is to provide grain to the emir of Katsina like guinea corn, millet, and maize for the emir's estate. It was said that it is through this gate Wali Jodoma was expelled from Katsina by the emir, so he went passed through the gate, turned around and cursed it, saying "Nothing good will be done on this Gate unless 500 years have passed". People built houses near every gate in Katsina except the Gate of Kwaya. The gate is now one of the major gates into Katsina from various cities. Shararar Fayif and Sabuwar Unguwa are close to this gate.
- Gate of Durbi: This gate, according to the first source, derived its name from the emirate of Durbi of Kusheyi. The gate derived the name when the Durbawa began ruling the emirate of Katsina. When they migrated to Katsina from their town, the emirate of Durbi changed its name to Durbi-Katsina. The ruler of the emirate of Durbi was called the "Hakimin Katsina". Durbi has been in Mani since Durbi Saddiku's rule from around 1810–1835. There were also other Durbi emirs, such as Durbi Fandiku who ruled from 1836 to 1860, Durbi Gidado (1860–1883), and Durbi Dikko (1891–1906). The Durbawa entered through the gate when they arrived at Katsina. The gate was then called the Gate of Durbi, meaning the Gate of emirs from Durbi. This gate is closed to towns like Filin Samji and Rimin Badawa.
- The Gate of Guga: This gate has three original names: it was called the Gate of Yammawa because it is located east of Katsina; the Gate of Tsaro, which means "gate of security" because soldiers were posted at the gate to prevent sudden attacks; it was mainly known as the Gate of Guga, the word "Guga" coming from a wife of Sarkin Gobir known as Bawa Jan Gwarzo. She ran away from her husband to Katsina through this gate, to warn the king of Katsina known as Muhammadu Jan Hazo (ruled from 1740 to 1751) for her husband's preparations to attack Katsina. After defeating the Gobir kingdom, the emir renamed this Gate to honor her loyalty.
- Gate of Sauri: This is a gate in the northwest sector of Katsina, which is close to Unguwar Rafukka, Nasarawa, Makera, and Yammawa. The gate of Sauri has two sources about its origin: according to the first source, Kofar Sauri derives its name from Sarkin Samari, who stays close to the gate. At first, the name "Samari" was given to the gate before it mutated into "Samri", then "Sauri". According to the second source, its name came from the regime of Sarki Ummarun Dallaje (1807–1835) when a warlord called Danbaskore lead a counterattack against the city of Katsina. when he discovered all the gates were closed, the emir of the Sauri town "Sarkin Sauri" (now Kaita), who was an ally to the Katsina, intercepted Danboskore and defeated him. When he emerged victorious, he erected a gate in the wall of Katsina, which was named the Gate of Sauri in remembrance of the legend of Sarkin Sauri.
- Gate of Marusa: This gate is considered to be one of the oldest gates in the history of Katsina. It was said to have been built in the 15th century. It was built together with the wall of Katsina, and derives its name from a ruler of Habe called Marusa Usman who ruled Dutsi. He was said to be a warrior who entered and exited Katsina through this gate from Dutsi. Another source says it was from a man who specialized in catching slaves.
- Gate of Yan daka: It was said to be built around 15th century. The gate Yan Daka derives its name from a ruler in Dustin Ma, who was given the post ruling of "Yanɗakan Katsina" in the Katsina emirate. His house was close to the gate.

=== Zazzau ===
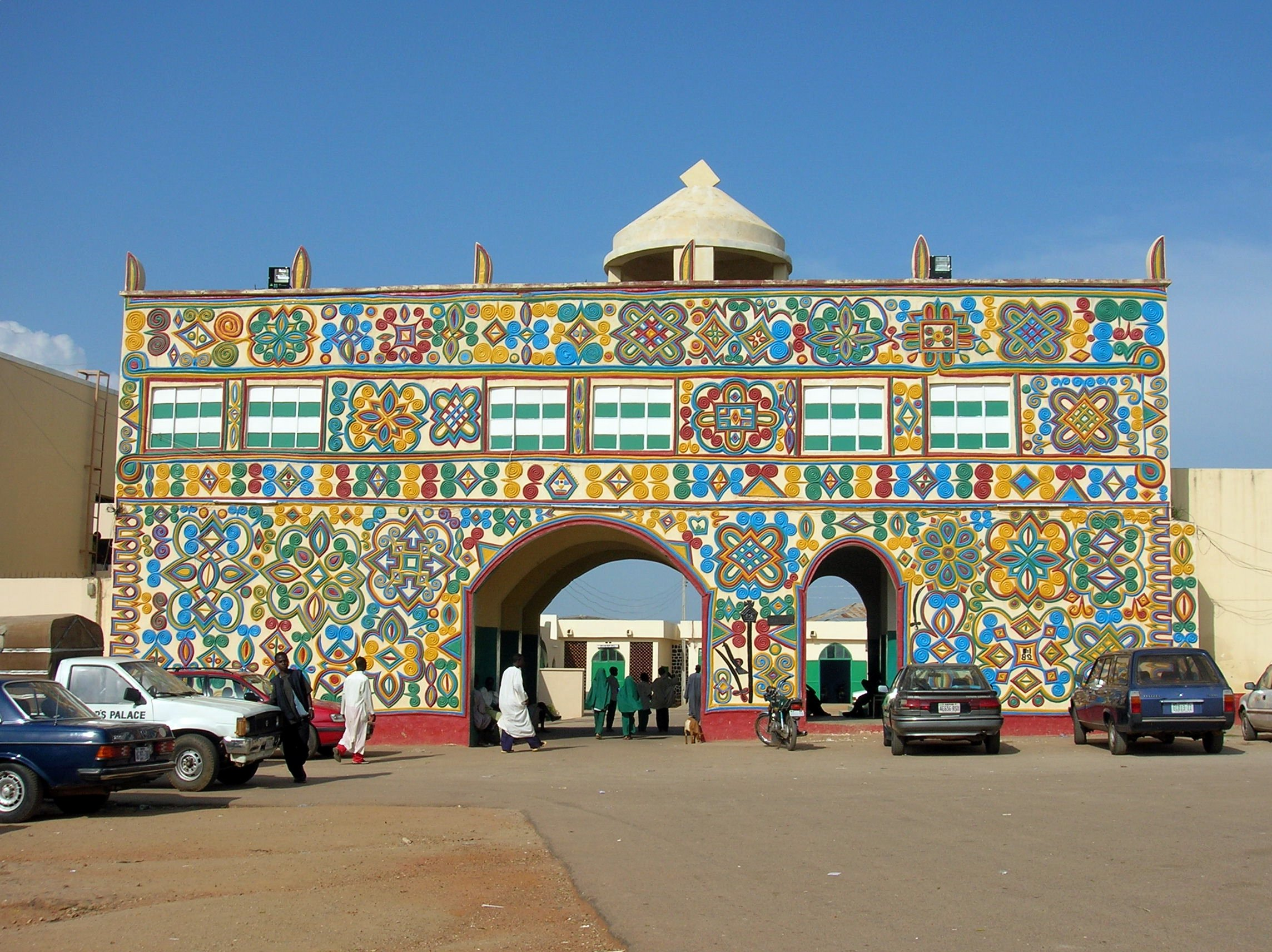
The Gate of Fada

The city of Zaria/Zazzau has seven gates that were originally erected after the wall of the city was constructed. The gates included the following except the gates of Jatau and the gate of Galadima. The current Sarkin Kofa of Zazzau is Alhaji Mansur Dambo Mai-Sa’a.

- Gate of Gayan: This gate was created for the people of Gadar Gayan, to have easy access when entering the city. The word Gayan is derived from a river named Gayan and a town named after the river called Gadar Gayan.
- Gate of Kuyan Bana: This gate was the second to be erected. It derives its name from a warlord of Queen Amina known as Mayaki Kuyan Bana. He is well known for his legendary victories in many battles. He established the small town then called Kuyan Bana, south of Kwatarkwashi. He built his home in Kuyan Bana and the Queen made him the guardian of the gate.
- Gate of Kona: This gate was the third gate to be constructed. The gate derives its name from two Islamic clerics that came to the city of Zaria known as konawa. When they arrived they spent their time outside the city of Zaria without coming to the town, when the gates were erected in their direction, people began calling the gate with the gate of Konawa, when they spent years near the gate.
- Gate of Kibo: The gate was originally named Kofar Tukur Tukur. The people of Gobir, Zamfara, Yawuri, and Kabi used to enter the city of Zaria from this gate. The gate derived its name from a stone located in a town of Tukur Tukur. Tukur Tukur is an old town outside Zaria; during the reign of Sarkin Zazzau Sambo, a battle took place close to Tukur Tukur alongside the gate. The gate changed its name to the arrow, "Kibo", afterward.
- Gate of Doka: The Gate of Doka was the fifth to be constructed in Zaria. It was originally called the gate of Kano. It is said that it derived its name from a tree that was close to the gate known as "Bishiyan Doka", while another source states the gate derived its name from the gatekeeper known as "Doka".
- Gate of Bai: The place where the gate is erected is at the back of the house of the emir of Zazzau. The word "bai" means behind in Hausa, which means the Gate behind the emir's house. The people of Bauchi usually enter the city through this gate.
- Gate of Jatau: This gate was named Jatau after a prominent king of Habe known as Isiyaku Jatau, who ruled Zazzau from 1782 to 1802.
- Gate of Galadima: This gate derives its name from Galadiman Zazzau known as Daudu, who was known by the beggars. The gate was close to his house. Some sources say it was Galadima Dokaje.
- Gate of Fada: Fada means palace. This gate is the main gate entrance to the palace of Sarkin Zazzau.

== Maintenance ==
The gates were formerly the responsibility of traditional rulers known as emirs who assigned maintenance duties to the Sarkin Kofa. In 1959, the Federal Government of Nigeria declared the gates to be national monuments and the responsibility transferred to the Federal Government. Some gates are falling into disrepair due to lack of maintenance.

== See also ==
- Hausa people
- Hausa language
- Hausa cuisine
- Ancient Kano City Walls
- Hausa Architecture
