= Durbi Takusheyi =

Archaeological terrain in northern Nigeria

Coordinates: 12°56′45″N 07°52′55″E

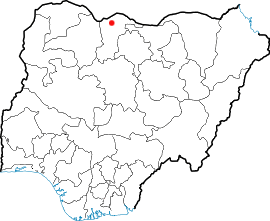
Durbi Takusheyi is situated near Katsina in Mani District of Katsina State, northern Nigeria

Durbi Takusheyi (or Durbi-ta-kusheyi, meaning "tombs of the chief priest") is a burial site and major archaeological landmark situated about 32 km east of Katsina in northern Nigeria. The burials of the early Katsina rulers span 200 years from the 13th / 14th century AD to the 15th / 16th century AD. The recovered sets of artifacts provide material historical clues as to the emergence of Hausa identity and city-states. The grave goods comprise a local, indigenous component besides foreign elements which attest to networks that reached far into the Islamic Near East. Katsina represented a focal point for trans-Saharan trade during the late middle ages, a crucial phase in local history during which the Hausa city-states emerged.

== History ==
Microliths found in 1965 on the mounds by R. C. Soper suggest that the vicinity of Katsina was continuously settled since the later stone age. The early history of one of the Hausa kingdoms, namely the kingdom of Katsina, was centered on several sites, of which Durbi Takusheyi was the most notable. It acquired its privileged status sometime before the 15th century due to the presence of shrines for ancestor idols located at baobabs near the tumuli. Local tradition holds that the clan, which is identified with the Durbawa, also venerated a solar deity and that their chief priest held the title of "Durbi", which is still a senior title in the Katsina Emirate. Usman states that the essentially agrarian, proto-urban villages of the region were presided over by a town head (or mai gari), who was the supposed representative of a senior lineage. The authority of the town heads in the Katsina area was based on their control of, and identification with, the ancestor cults centered on the Durbi tombs. Durbi Takusheyi's ancestor cult and degree of political hegemony eventually withered in favor of a nature worship cult centered on the shrine of Yuna, at the tamarind tree of Bawada, near Tilla.

The Durbi tombs were overlooked by Westerners until Palmer initiated the first excavations in 1907. On 23 April 1959 the Nigerian Antiquities Department (the later NCMM) declared the site a national heritage monument. In 1959 it was taken to include three large and two small tumuli, in addition to the old baobab tree known as Kuka Katsi, and the site of the former tree known as Kuka Kumayo. There are however eight or nine tumuli, each with apparently one central, individual interment, spanning some 200 years. They are situated in a flat to undulating landscape, characterized by granite hills and sandy terraces.

== Grave goods ==
Excavated objects include pottery, grinding stones, iron spearheads, faunal remains, brass bars, bowls, cornelian beads, and golden earrings. The burial goods were fabricated from both inorganic (metal, glass, and stone) and organic materials (cloth, wood, and hides or furs). A bowl of Near Eastern origin in tumulus 7, dated to the late 15th to early 16th century, attests to increased international and Islamic influence at this time. Among the decorative body ornaments were a beaded belt in tumulus 7, a cap or headpiece covered in cowry shells and a fur-lined spiked leg bracelet or guard in tumulus 4, and a belt decorated in cowry shells in tumulus 5. The non-ferrous metal objects were made of copper, copper-based alloys or silver. They range from bracelets and/or anklets of various forms and manufacturing techniques and leg guards to bowls, buckets, ingots, and finery such as beads, pins, and forks. Their manufacturing and metal types suggest imported finished and unfinished imported objects as well as locally manufactured and/or locally modified objects. Chemical and lead isotopic analyses revealed metals from multiple sources, from Africa to Iran.

== Excavations ==
=== Palmer excavations of 1907 ===
The mounds were partially excavated in 1907 by Herbert Richmond Palmer in cooperation with the Emir of Katsina, Muhammadu Dikko. The largest mound and eventually two others were excavated when no clear information about their history could be obtained. They found ceramic and metallic goods, but all the items of this first excavation appear to be lost with only minimal information preserved.

=== Lange excavations of 1991-1992 ===
The second excavation was headed by Dierk Lange of Bayreuth and funded by the German Research Foundation (DFG). Three additional mounds were discovered, numbered 4, 5 and 7, which were excavated during 1991 and 1992. Each mound was found to contain one interment at its center. The associated burial goods were made from inorganic materials such as metal, glass, stone, and cowries, besides organic materials such as cloth, wood, and hides. Though some artifacts were of local origin, others hailed from distant Islamic locations. Radiocarbon tests dated one group of artifacts to the early 14th century AD, while typology and art history placed another set of artifacts in the late 15th to early 16th century. The recovered items were first stored in Katsina, then transferred to the Gidan Makama Museum in Kano, and eventually deposited at the Jos Museum for further analyses. In 2007 it was shipped to the Romano-Germanic Central Museum in Mainz for general conservation.

=== Breunig excavations of 2005-2007 ===
In 2005, German archaeologists led by Prof. Peter Breunig started excavations of several sites related to the Nok culture. They gained the approval of the Nigerian Museums Commission (NCMM) to completely restore and analyze the Durbi Takusheyi artifacts. In 2007, the scholars are said to have exported "tons of materials" excavated from Durbi Takusheyi for restoration and conservation at the Romano-Germanic Central Museum in Mainz. In 2011 the museum opened the first exhibition of the materials, along with Nok culture artifacts, and all items were expected to be returned to Nigeria in 2012.

== Return of the artifacts ==
Arrangements for the return of artifacts exported since the 1990s were concluded in 2014. The collection arrived in Abuja later that year, from where it was taken to the National Museum in Katsina. It was first displayed in Katsina during 2015's International Museum Day celebration.

== Tradition ==
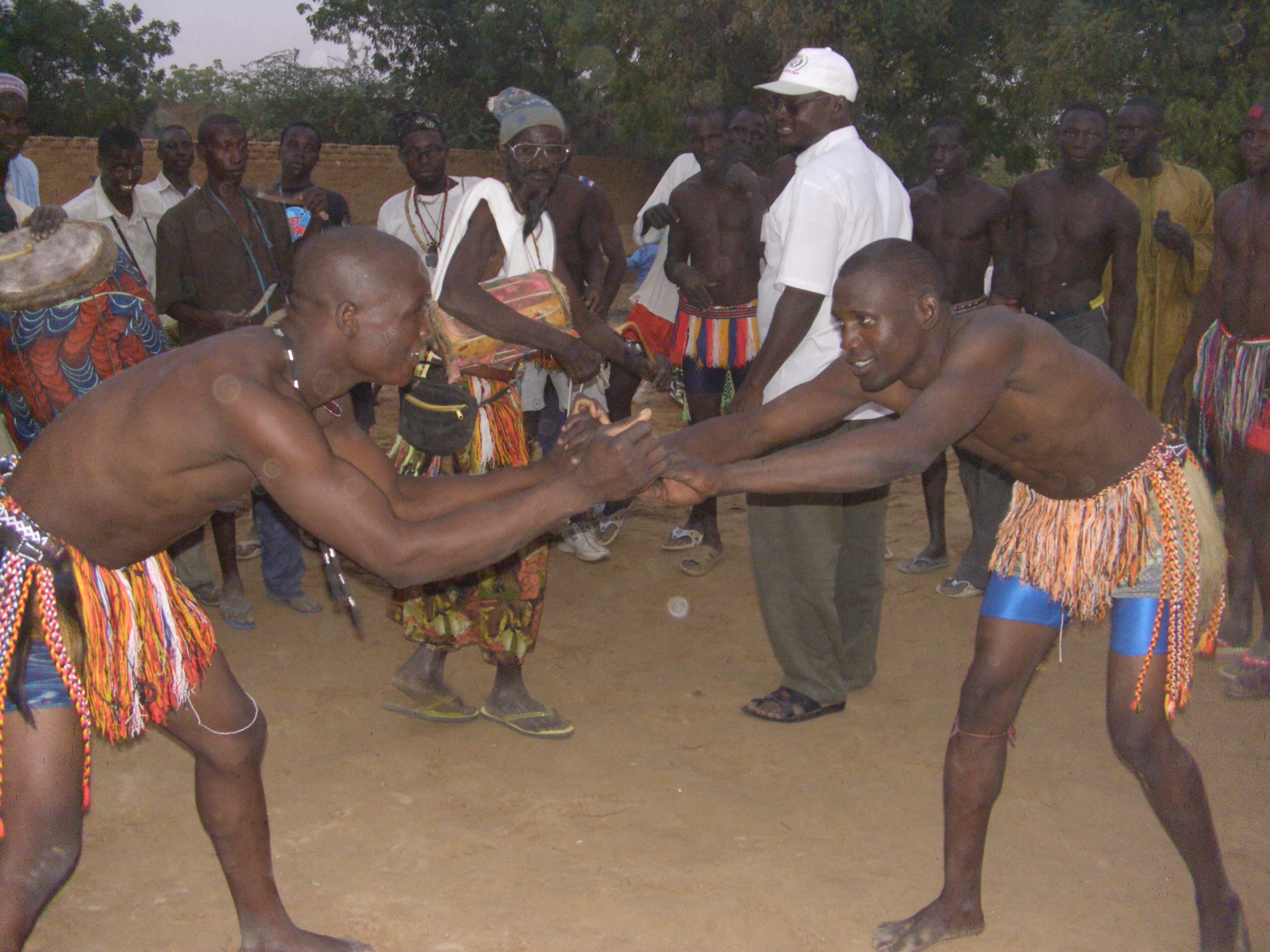
Tradition holds that the last of Durbi Takusheyi's rulers was overthrown in a customary wrestling match

Various myths are associated with the site and its rulers. It is traditionally believed that five kings of the Durbawa royal clan in the Aznā clan-family would have ruled before the Korau royal clan of the Hausā clan-family came to power. The gist of the legends holds that a Hausa man, Kumayo (or Kumayun), to whom one of the baobab shrines was later dedicated, founded the Katsina kingdom in the 13th century. He had his capital at Durbi Takusheyi, and his Katsina people intermarried with Durbawa, Tazarawa, Nafatawa, and Jinjino-Bakawa people. Later Sanau, a grandson of Bayajidda, became king of the Durbawa in the dynasty of Kumayo. Korau (who may have lived c.1260) was an outsider from Yandoto, a malam (i.e. teacher, learned person, or titleholder) who was not of royal blood. While outwardly befriending Sanau, he plotted against him while attending a feast as his guest. He lured Sanau into a wrestling match (or a wrestling duel, a mode of succession) at the Bawada tamarind tree. Here Korau killed Sanau with a short sword after Sanau was thrown to the ground. In this way Korau became the first king of the new dynasty at Katsina, and the sword is still to be seen in the insignia of the town.
