= Ummarun Dallaje =

Ummarun Dallaje (Ummaru of Dallaje) was the 39th Islamic Leader of Katsina, the first Fulani emir, as well as the patriarch of the Dallazawa dynasty. He became Amirul Muminin after the Jihad of Shehu Usman dan Fodiyo, succeeding Magajin Haladu, the last ruler of the centuries-old Habe dynasty, which had been founded by Muhammadu Korau. Ummaru was succeeded by his son Saddiku.

== Biography ==
Ummaran Dallaje was the first Fulani emir as well as the patriarch of the Dallazawa dynasty. He was born in the town of Dallaje, approximately 50 km from Katsina, his father's name was Abdulmumini. Ummaru's grandparents migrated from the Kanem-Bornu empire and originally belonged to an Arab tribe from Ouaddai currently part of the Republic of Chad. When Ummarun’s grandparents arrived in Katsina, they first settled in a village called Makar and later moved to Dasije after which they settled at Dallaje.

== Education ==
He started studying the Qur'an at a very early age, he later traveled far and studied under several scholars including Dan Fodio. After completing his studies, he started preaching within and outside Katsina. In 1804, Shehu Usman Dan Fodio declared Jihad against the Habe rulers of Hausa Kingdoms. Among the first people to answer the Shehu's call and declare their support was Mallam Ummaru.

When jihad broke out in 1804, Malam Ummarun Dallaje who is a strong supporter of Shebu Ibn Fodio drew his support largely from the towns of Dallaje, Rugar Bade, Sabon Gari and other surrounding settlements. Shehu Usman Dan Fodio declared Jihad against the Habe rulers of Hausa Kingdoms. Among the first people to answer the Shehu's call and declare their support for Ummaru.

=== Attacks ===
At the end of 1805, Ummarun Dallaje met with a group of Jihadists which camped at ‘Yantumaki. He told them that he was sent by Muhammad Bello with a message that they should continue to fight. As a result, they started to launch expeditions in areas where support could easily be obtained. They attacked a settlement only if the inhabitants rejected their call for support. They usually announced their arrival with a call to prayer outside the town. Later, they called a meeting with the leaders of the community. At such meetings, the inhabitants were urged to revive the Sunnah and enforce the Shariah, they were called upon to support Shehu ibn fodio.

Around 1806, a meeting of Jihad Commanders from Katsina, Kano, Zazzau and other parts of Hausaland was convened at Birnin Gada. The meeting was initially scheduled to take place at Magami (Mani LG) where Shehu was to attend but because of his old age, he could not undertake the long and hazardous journey from Gwandu. Therefore, he sent Muhammadu Bello to represent him. During the meeting, Bello urged each Jihad Commander to take an oath to obey his instructions and to follow the Sunnah in everything, every time and under all circumstances. In his message, Shehu ibn fodio emphasized that Allah would make them victorious but warned them not to become corrupted like the rulers they were fighting and to avoid injustice, envy and disunity.

The Jihadists moved closer and held a siege on the Capital of Katsina by cutting off food supply to the city. This situation, coupled with the poor harvest recorded that year, forced many people to leave the town. When the situation became tense, the Sarkin Katsina fled to Dankama, and the Jihadists moved in and took over the capital. They later launched an attack on Dankama but failed to capture the town. From Dankama, the Sarki launched a counterattack on the reformers which forced them to abandon the capital and retreat to Sabon Gari. After their victory, the Sarkin Katsina did not show any interest to resettle there. He returned to Dankama where he received assistance from Sarkin Kance.

From his base at Sabon Gari, Ummarun Dallaje mapped out the next strategy to follow after his surprise defeat by Sarkin Katsina. Later, a contingent under the renown warrior Malam Muhammadu Namoda arrived from Zamfara, while others arrived from Kano and Daura. The combined contingents marched against Sarkin Katsina at Dankama where a fierce battle took place in which Sarkin Katsina Magajin Halidu and many of his chiefs were killed. His remaining forces and followers fled to Kwargom, a vassal kingdom of Zinder, where they appointed another Sarki. The Jihadists pursued and rounded them up and the Sarki fell into a well and died. The remaining supporters escaped to Damagaram where they appointed Dankasawa, the son of Tsaga-rana as their leader in order to maintain their cohesion.

After the defeat of Sarkin Katsina, the Jihadists turned their attention to the eastern part of the Kingdom where they attacked a number of towns that had not been conquered. Their first place of call was Mani where the ruler of the town known as Mani Ibrahim Arne refused to surrender to Ummarun Dallaje. In the ensuing encounter, Mani Arne was killed.

== Rise to the throne ==
Towards the end of 1807, the Amirul Muminin Shehu Usmanu Danfodio, appointed Ummarun Dallaje as the Emir of Katsina. By this appointment, Ummarun Dallaje became the first Fulani Emir and founder of Dallazawa Dynasty. When he settled down, he ordered an expedition against the towns of Maska and Gozaki, and brought them under control by 1810: one of the first things he did was to build a new Juma’at mosque in Katsina. Thereafter, he introduced several measures, which laid the foundation of the new Emirate.

Mallam Umarun Dallaje was Shehu Danfodio's flag-bearer who in company of others conquered and sacked the habe rulers and become the first fulani Emir of Katsina, thereby establishing the Dallawaza Dynasty which ruled Katsina for 100 years (1806-1906). Malam Abdulmumin dan Muhammadu Goshi's son Mallam Umaran Dallaje was born in 1781 at Dallaje village of Bindawa, Katsina state.

He had his early Islamic education under the tutelage of his father, Mallam Abdulmumin. With emergence of Shehu Usman Danfodio, Mallam Ummarun Dallaje decided to join Shebu Usman Danfodio's quest to further his knowledge on Islamic studies and to also give his contribution to the shehu in his effort to sanitise and reform the deteriorating state of affairs in the practice and teaching of the religion of Islam in Hausaland. While with shehu, Mallam Ummarun Dallaje close friends with him and planned to extend that he was one of the disciples appointed to carry and keep custody of the shehu's book during preaching expeditions. They travelled together extensively until Mallam Umarun Dallaje become one of the famous commanders of the shehu's forces who facilitated the conquest of the jihad. Mallam Ummarun Dallaje was one of the chief strategists at the famous battle of Tafkin Kwato which was the shehu's first victorious battle.

Mallam Ummarun's high level activity in the planning and execution of the jihad and his commitment and bravery in the ensuring battles of the jihad earned him the confidence of the shehu and this resulted in his appointment by Sultan Muhammadu Bello to lead the battles of Alwasa and Alkalawa, both of which were victorious. The struggles continued like this and it was at the peak of these exploits that the jihad movement for the conquest of Katsina was planned and ordered by the Shehu and Mallam Umaru naturally become the leader of the expedition.

He conquered and took over Katsina in the Islamic month of Rajab in 1806, while the sacked habe rulers fled to maradi in the present Republic of Niger. This development ushered the Katsina emirate into the fold of the sokoto caliphate with Malam Ummarun Dallaje as the flagbearer of the caliphate and therefore the Amir (Emir) of Katsina. He faced the task of consolidation of the Emirate and the institutionalization of leadership based on the principles of Islamic teachings and jurisprudence. In his desire to administer the Emirate in equity and justice, Mallam Ummarun Dallaje wrote to Sultan Muhammad Bello asking him for advice on leadership in Islam.

== Usul al-Siyasa ==
Sultan Muhammad Bello's reply to Mallam Umarun Dallaje was the famous literature on leadership in the caliphate known as "Usul al-Siyasa", the opening paragraph of which started thus:

"Ummarun Dallaje, a man who strives in the course of Allah with sincerity and zeal may Allah help him, prolong his high position and power give him aid from His spirit and multiply the number of his supporters to write for him some words in connection with. The principles of siyasa and the mode of conduct for a sincere man in matter connected with leadership..."

Sultan Muhammad Bello went further to say: "Know, my brother that one of the most serious misfortunes that may possibly fall on a servant (of Allah) is to be a leader Amir or an emir".

The Usul al-Siyasa was written by Muhammad Bello to guide Ummarun Dallaje and successive Emirs of Katsina on matters of politics and leadership. The book explains that rulers are blessed by God, while a tyrannical and unjust ruler is abhorred by Him, and totally doomed. With numerous quotations from Hadith, Bello highlights God’s strong dislike for unjust rulers and the inevitable punishment awaiting them.

The book also explains the principles of politics and deliverance in matters of politics:

- The first principle of Muslim leadership is the establishment of an order in human society through the implementation of the divine law, and obedience to the Sunnah of Muhammad.
- Secondly, the Muslim leader should be firm, gentle and generous.
- Thirdly, the ruler should keep company of devout Ulama and listen to their advice.
- The fourth principle deals with the relationship between the Emir and his subjects.

Muhammad Bello warned Ummarun Dallaje to be careful in his selection of administrators, and closely supervise them. He said majority of them are slaves to their stomachs, and would use the Emir for their own ends, and desert him the moment power is taken away from him. Muhammadu Bello made it an important duty of the Emir to see that the spirit of justice is inculcated among the people. He pointed out that people who are unjust towards one another get an unjust Government. The duty of the Emir is to forbid what is wrong and order what is right. But this should be carried out without harshness. Muhammadu Bello said that people should not be condemned or punished on account of marginal errors or deviation. But the responsibility of the Emir to procure and safeguard the welfare of his people does not end with the spiritual and social aspects of their lives, it extends to their material and economic well-being.

The publication helped greatly in laying the political, social and economic foundation of not only in Katsina emirate, but up till now serve as a reference document on good governance world over. Mallam Ummaru died in 1835.
