= Kaduna =

Capital city of Kaduna State, Nigeria

- City
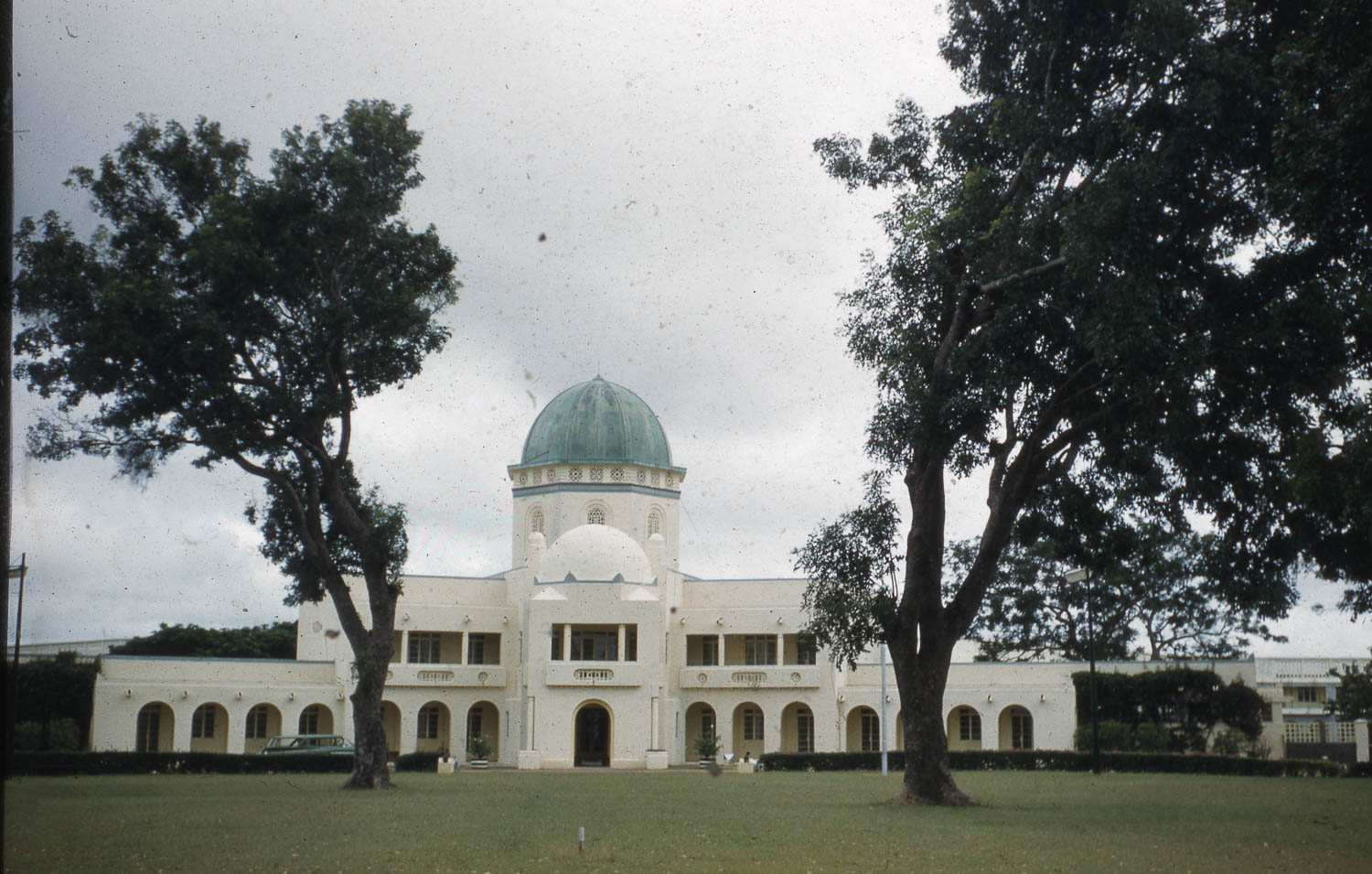
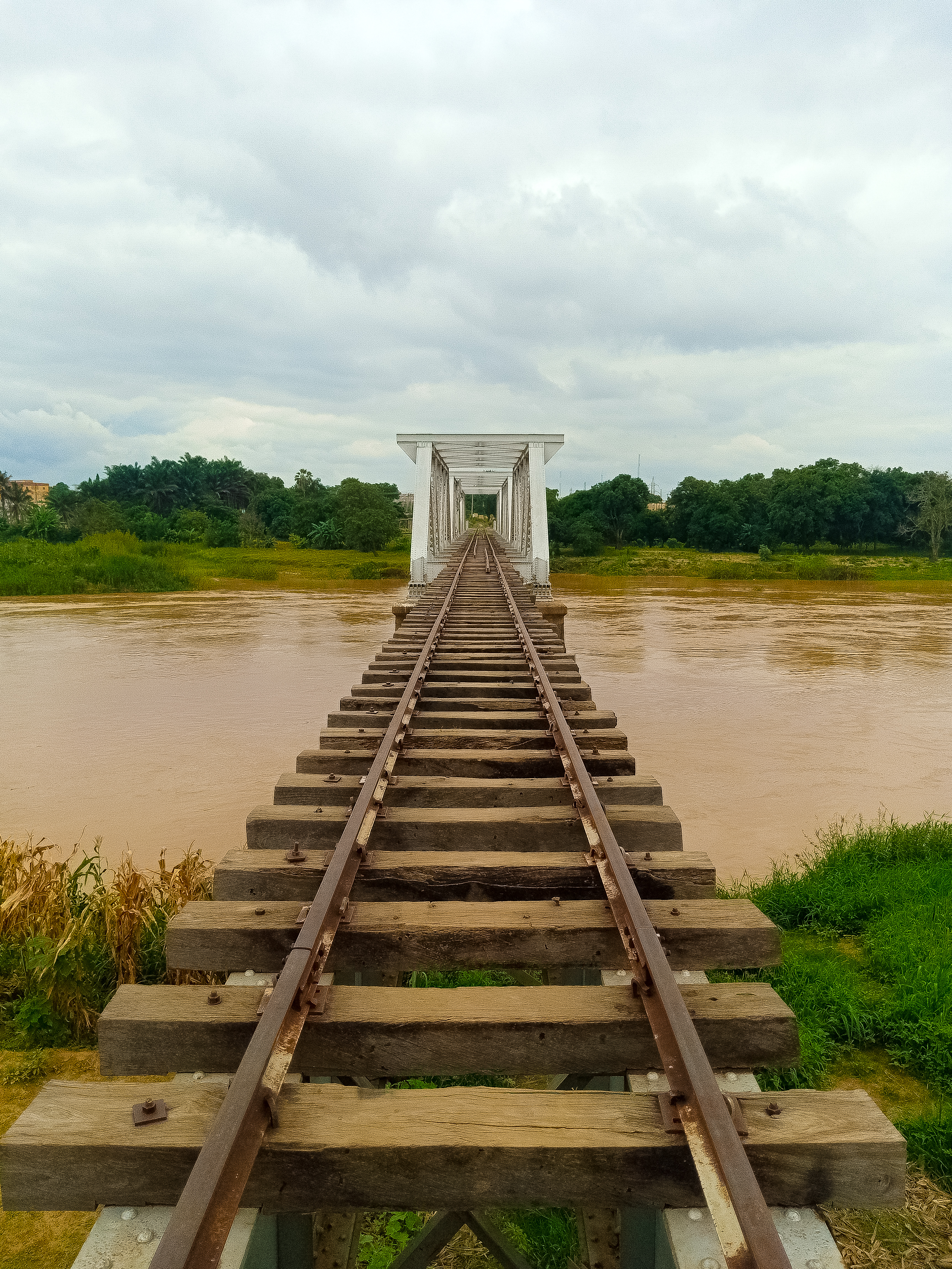
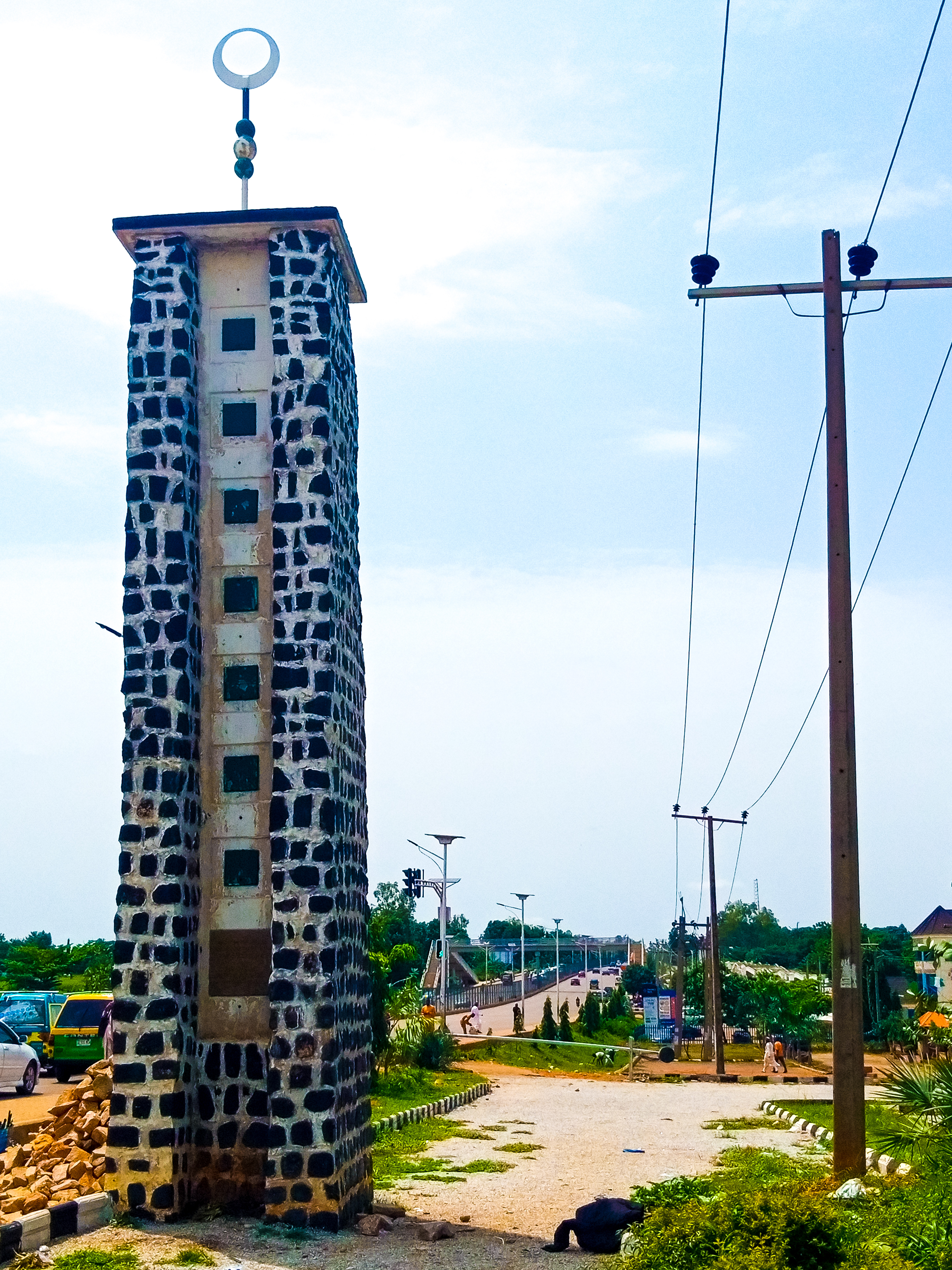
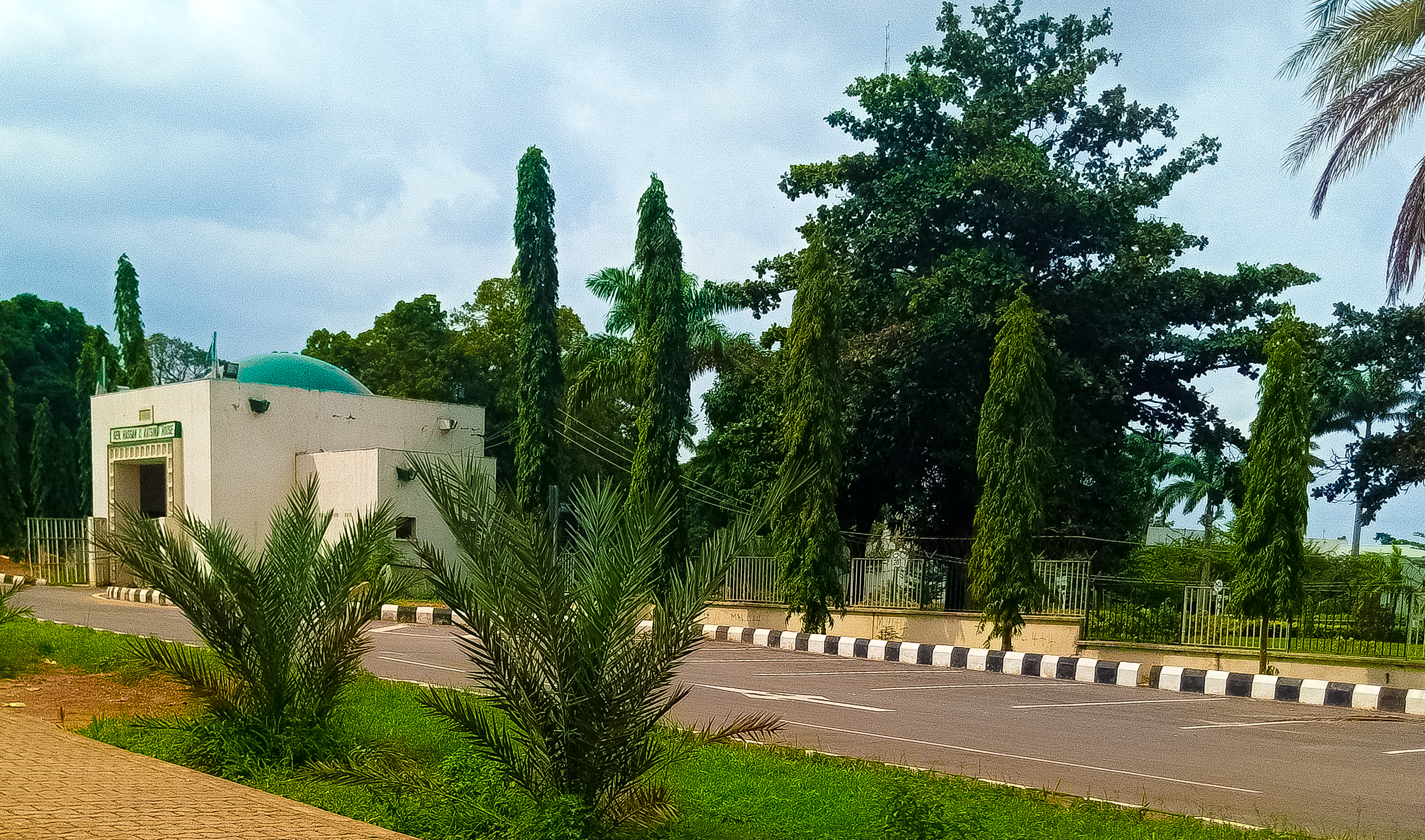
- Clockwise from top: Lugard Hall, the Kaduna River, columns in honour of Elizabeth II's state visit, and entrance of Hassan Usman Katsina House

- Location in Nigeria
- Coordinates: 10°31′23″N 7°26′25″E
- Country: Nigeria
- State: Kaduna State
- LGAs: Chikun; Igabi; Kaduna North; Kaduna South

Government
  - Governor: Uba Sani
  - Deputy Governor: Hadiza Balarabe

Area
  - Total: 431 km^{2} (166 sq mi)
- Elevation: 250 m (820 ft)

Population (2006 census)
  - Total: 760,084
  - Rank: 8th
  - Density: 1,760/km^{2} (4,570/sq mi)
  - Ethnicities: Gbagyi; Adara; Hausa; Atyap-Bajju; Ham; Yoruba; Fulani; Kanuri; Marghi; Nupe; Igbo

GDP (PPP, 2015 int. Dollar)
  - Year: 2023
  - Total: $9.7 billion
  - Per capita: $8,200
- Time zone: UTC+1 (CET/WAT)
- Climate: Aw
- Website: www.kdsg.gov.ng

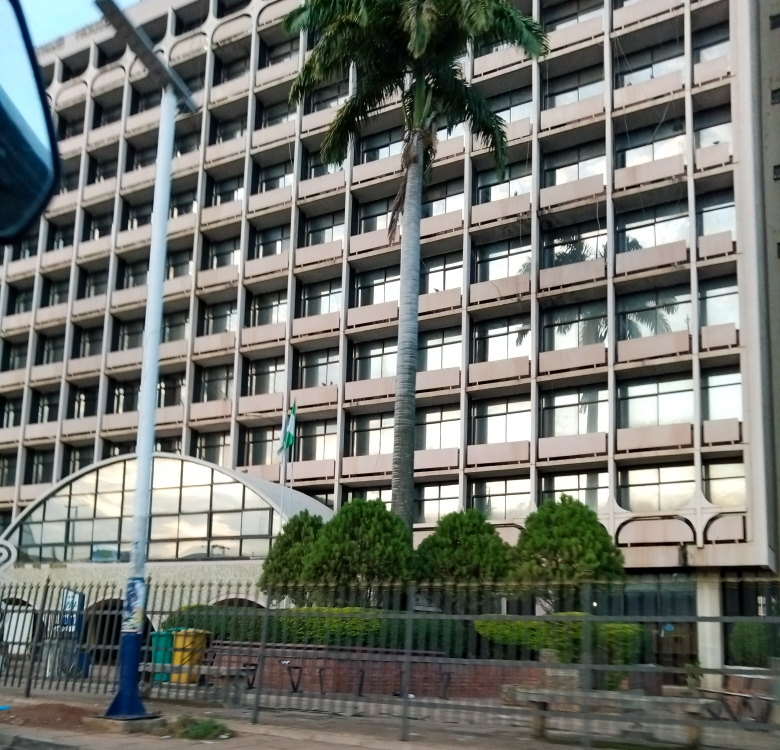
Kaduna City Center

Kaduna is the capital city of Kaduna State, and the former political capital of Northern Nigeria. It is located in north-western Nigeria, on the Kaduna River. It is a trade center and a major transportation hub as the gateway to northern states of Nigeria, with its rail and road network.

The population of Kaduna was estimated at 760,084 as of the 2006 Nigerian census. Rapid urbanisation since 2005 has created an increasingly large population, and as of 2024, the city has an estimated population of 1.2 million people.

== Etymology ==
The word Kaduna is said to be a corruption of the Hausa word Kadduna (crocodile, kaduna being the plural form). The name may also be linked to the Gbagyi word Odna, meaning "river".

== History ==
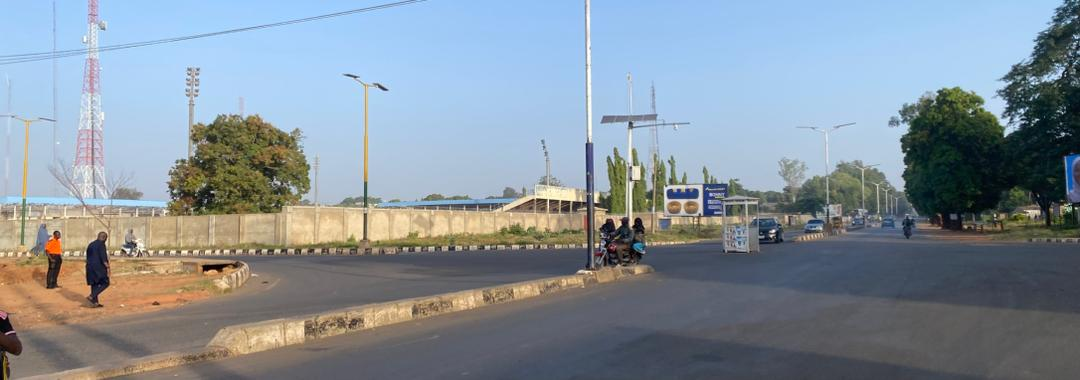
sultan road Kaduna state

Kaduna was founded by British colonists in 1900. The first British governor of Northern Nigeria, Sir Frederick Lugard, chose the site for development due to its proximity to the Lagos-Kano Railway. It became the capital of Nigeria's former Northern Region in 1917, and retained this status until 1967. The city is still influential as the headquarters of various political, military and cultural organisations, especially in Northern Nigeria.

In 1976, when the General Murtala Mohammed administration created seven new states in Nigeria, North Central State was renamed Kaduna State, along with its capital. The state was made up of the two colonial period Provinces of Zaria and Katsina. In 1991, the number of states in the country was increased from twenty-one to thirty, after which Katsina Province became Katsina State, while the old Zaria Province became the new Kaduna State. There are twenty-three local government areas (LGAs) in the state, although the number of ethnic groups is much larger.

== Economy ==
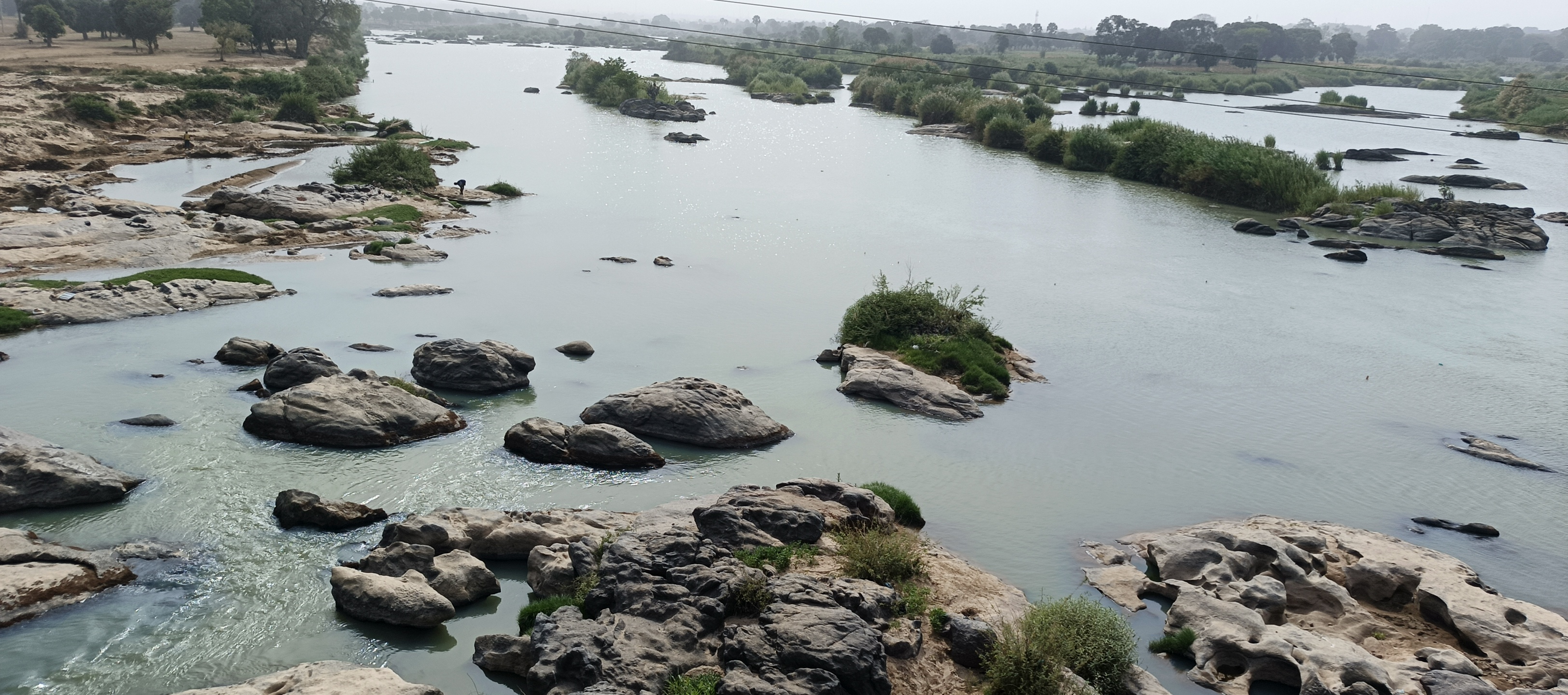
River Kaduna

Kaduna is a major industrial center in Northern Nigeria, manufacturing products like textiles, machinery, steel, aluminum, petroleum products and bearings. However, the textile industry has been in decline due to recent Chinese imports and factory closures caused by years of neglect across many administrations. Other light manufactures include: plastics, pharmaceuticals, leather goods, furniture, and televisions. Agriculture is also a major industry in Kaduna, and as such, the Bank of Agriculture has its headquarters in the city. Some main agricultural exports include: cotton, peanuts, sorghum, and ginger. Kaduna also has a branch of the Nigerian Stock Exchange. Automobile manufacturing also remains an important part of Kaduna's economy. Peugeot Automobiles Nigeria has an assembly plant in Kaduna. Kaduna Refining and Petrochemical Company (KRPC), one of Nigeria's four main oil refineries is located in Kaduna. It is supplied by a pipeline from the Niger Delta oil fields.

A 2009 World Bank survey states that Kaduna is one of the top six cities with the highest unemployment. 20% of the population was estimated to be unemployed.

== Sports and tourism ==
There is a large racecourse named Murtala Mohammed Square, approximately 1.6 kilometres (1 mi) in perimeter, inside which is found the Kaduna Polo Club. Kaduna Golf Club is also located within the Kaduna central business district. Other sports facilities include the Ahmadu Bello Stadium and Ranchers Bees Stadium.

== Infrastructure ==
The infrastructure network in the city was upgraded by the administration of Governor Nasir el-Rufai with an underpass, flyover structures and streetlight facilities. Kaduna has an inland dry port. The Nigerian military has several formations and institutions in the city including the Nigerian Defence Academy, and the Air Force Institute of Technology.

== Airport ==
The city is served by Kaduna International Airport. The airport commenced operations in 1982. The Nigerian Air Force maintains a presence in the city.

== Railways ==
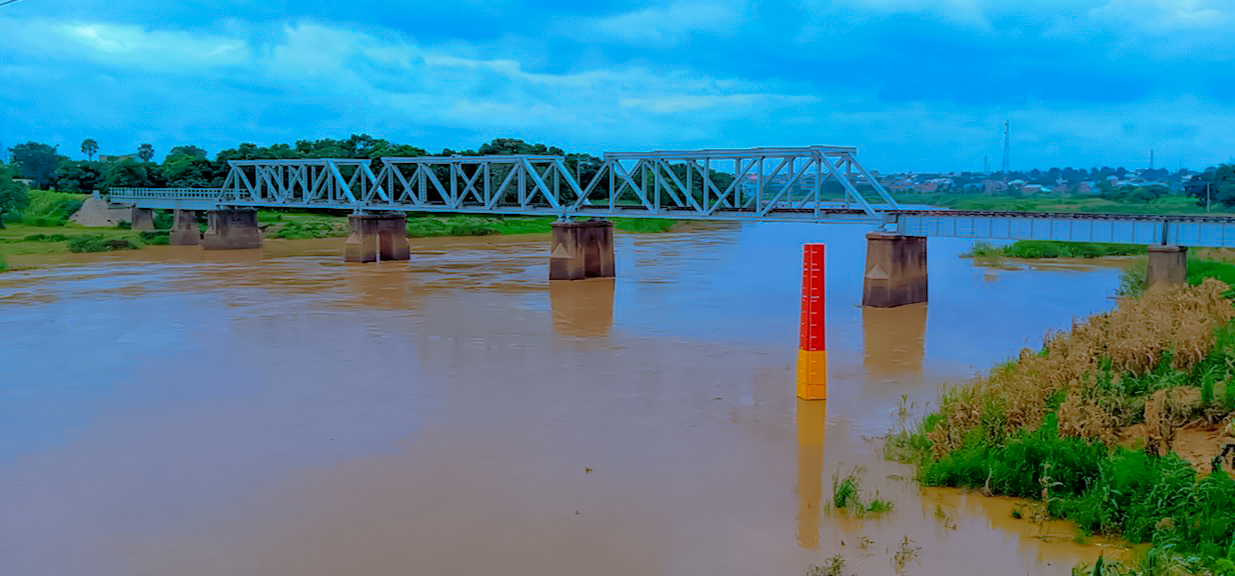
Railway overhead bridge in kaduna state

Kaduna is also on the route of the planned Lagos–Kano Standard Gauge Railway, which has been completed between the national capital of Abuja and Kaduna. Trains for Abuja depart from the Rigasa Railway Station in Kaduna. Kaduna is an important junction on Nigeria's Cape gauge railway network. At Kaduna, a branch line connects the Lagos–Nguru Railway to the Port Harcourt–Maiduguri railway.

== Education ==
There are multiple educational institutions within Kaduna, including:

- Kaduna State University
- Nigerian Defence Academy (NDA), Kaduna
- Greenfield University Kaduna
- National Open University of Nigeria, Kaduna Study Center
- Air Force Institute of Technology, Kaduna
- National Teachers Institute (NTI), Kaduna
- School of Midwifery Kaduna
- Kaduna Polytechnic (1968), Kaduna
- National Board for Islamic and Arabic studies
- Kaduna Business School
- Dialogue Institute Kaduna
- Institute of Ophthalmology, National Eye Centre, Kaduna.

== Administrative areas ==
Administration of the state started with the concept of Provincial Administration and Native/Local Authority systems. However, in 1976 the Mohammed Administration introduced the Local Government Area system (LGA) which delegated some responsibilities to the elected/appointed councillors. With each successive Federal Military Administration, the number of the LGAs in Kaduna State increased from fourteen in the early 1980s to the present twenty-three in 1998. In each LGA, smaller units such as districts and wards, are recognised.

== Places of worship ==
Among the places of worship, there are churches and mosques. Sultan Bello Mosque is the biggest and a central mosque in Kaduna. There are also churches: Church of Nigeria (Anglican Communion), Presbyterian Church of Nigeria (World Communion of Reformed Churches), Nigerian Baptist Convention (Baptist World Alliance), Evangelical Church Winning All, Living Faith Church Worldwide, Redeemed Christian Church of God, Assemblies of God, Roman Catholic Archdiocese of Kaduna (Catholic Church), Mountain of Fire and Miracles Ministries, Universal Reformed Christian Church (Protestant Church).

== Climate ==
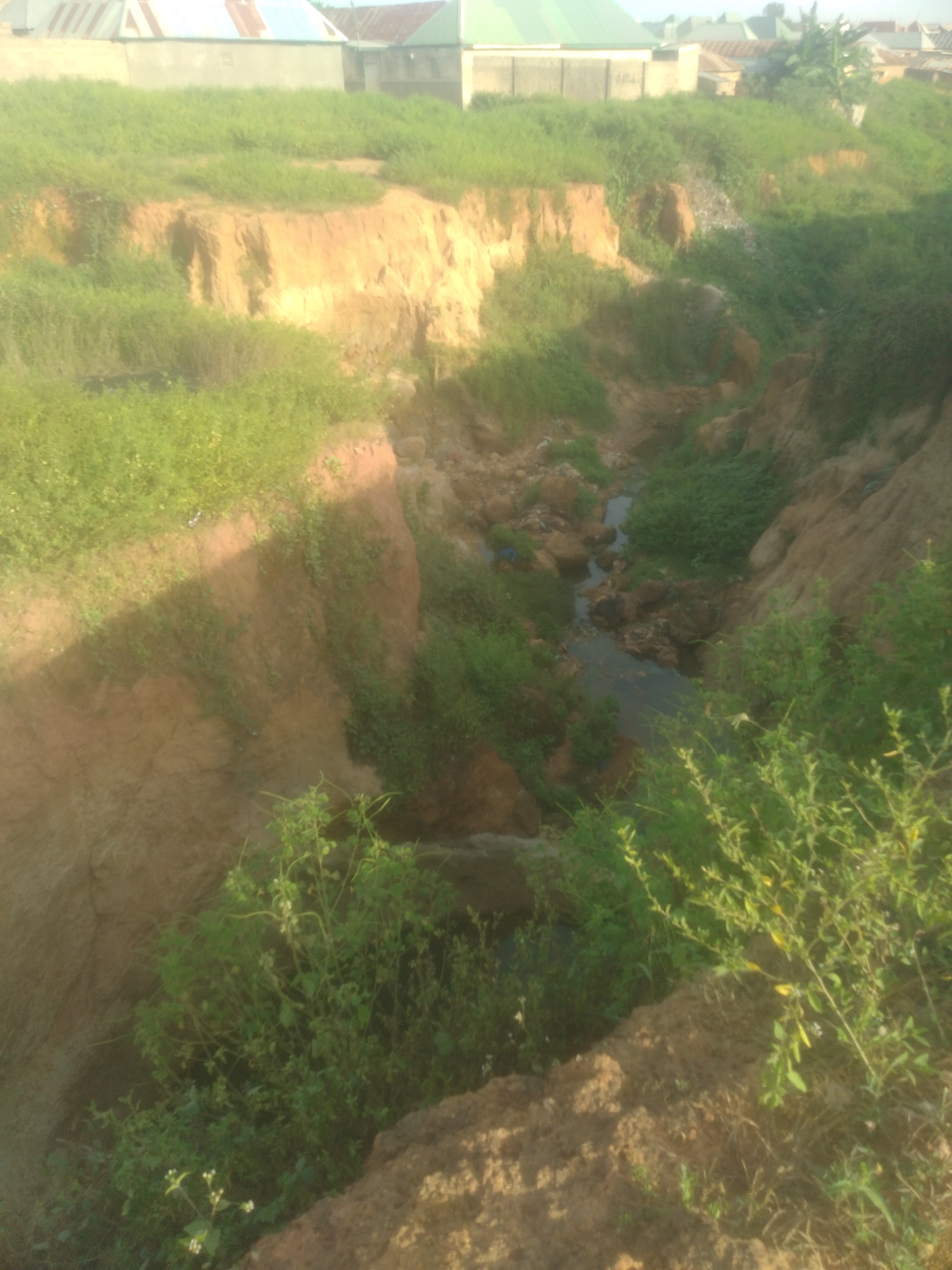
Erosion Rigasa Kaduna

The Kaduna region has a tropical climate. The summers have a lot more rain than the winters do. The predominant climate in this area is categorised as Aw by the Köppen-Geiger scale. Kaduna's yearly mean temperature is 25.2 °C, or 77.4 °F. A total of 39.3 inches or 998 mm of precipitation falls per year. Due to its proximity to the equator, Kaduna's summers are difficult to characterise. January, February, March, May, June, July, August, September, October, November, and December are the finest months to travel.

Climate data for Kaduna (1991-2020, extremes 1951-1965 & 1991-2020)
Month	Jan	Feb	Mar	Apr	May	Jun	Jul	Aug	Sep	Oct	Nov	Dec	Year
Record high °C (°F)	38.0 (100.4)	40.0 (104.0)	40.0 (104.0)	43.0 (109.4)	39.3 (102.7)	35.0 (95.0)	36.0 (96.8)	33.0 (91.4)	33.4 (92.1)	37.7 (99.9)	36.4 (97.5)	36.2 (97.2)	43.0 (109.4)
Mean daily maximum °C (°F)	31.3 (88.3)	34.1 (93.4)	36.2 (97.2)	36.1 (97.0)	33.1 (91.6)	30.5 (86.9)	29.0 (84.2)	28.3 (82.9)	29.9 (85.8)	31.6 (88.9)	32.9 (91.2)	31.6 (88.9)	32.1 (89.8)
Daily mean °C (°F)	23.4 (74.1)	26.2 (79.2)	28.7 (83.7)	29.6 (85.3)	27.7 (81.9)	25.8 (78.4)	24.8 (76.6)	24.4 (75.9)	25.1 (77.2)	25.8 (78.4)	24.9 (76.8)	23.4 (74.1)	25.8 (78.4)
Mean daily minimum °C (°F)	15.5 (59.9)	18.3 (64.9)	21.3 (70.3)	23.1 (73.6)	22.2 (72.0)	21.0 (69.8)	20.6 (69.1)	20.4 (68.7)	20.2 (68.4)	19.9 (67.8)	16.8 (62.2)	15.2 (59.4)	19.6 (67.3)
Record low °C (°F)	9.0 (48.2)	8.9 (48.0)	15.0 (59.0)	14.7 (58.5)	16.7 (62.1)	15.6 (60.1)	16.7 (62.1)	16.7 (62.1)	15.6 (60.1)	13.3 (55.9)	10.0 (50.0)	9.4 (48.9)	8.9 (48.0)
Average precipitation mm (inches)	0.0 (0.0)	0.4 (0.02)	11.2 (0.44)	41.5 (1.63)	124.7 (4.91)	184.8 (7.28)	254.4 (10.02)	335.3 (13.20)	280.7 (11.05)	92.0 (3.62)	0.0 (0.0)	0.0 (0.0)	1,325 (52.17)
Average precipitation days (≥ 1.0 mm)	0.0	0.1	0.8	3.4	9.7	12.9	14.8	17.5	16.4	7.1	0	0	82.8
Average relative humidity (%)	40.1	33.9	38.0	58.5	74.9	81.6	85.1	87.4	85.2	77.8	59.1	48.6	64.2
Mean monthly sunshine hours	279.0	262.7	266.6	243.0	241.8	216.0	155.0	120.9	171.0	248.0	285.0	294.5	2,783.5
Mean daily sunshine hours	9.0	9.3	8.6	8.1	7.8	7.2	5.0	3.9	5.7	8.0	9.5	9.5	7.6
Source 1: NOAA
Source 2: Deutscher Wetterdienst (sun 1951-1965)

== Notable people ==
Notable people from Kaduna include:

- Umar Farouk Abdulmutallab, the "underwear bomber" suspect of the terrorist arson attempt on Northwest flight 253 in December 2009, grew up here.
- Nabil Abdulrashid, British-Nigerian comedian
- Efe Ambrose, footballer who played for the Nigeria national football team was born and raised here
- Tijani Babangida, footballer who played winger with Ajax
- Celestine Babayaro, footballer who played mainly in the Premier League
- Sunday Bada, athlete
- Mamman Daura, elder statesman
- David Egbo, footballer
- Michael Eneramo, footballer
- Fiona Fullerton, British actress and former Bond girl
- Leke James, footballer
- Hassan Katsina, elder statesman.
- Zamani Lekwot, statesman
- Ahmed Makarfi, politician
- Magaji Muhammed, politician and elder statesman.
- Umaru Mutallab, Nigerian business mogul
- Sam Oye (born 1974), pastor
- Dahiru Sadi, footballer
- Namadi Sambo, politician
- Shehu Sani, politician
- Uba Sani, politician
- Shehu Musa Yaradua, politician and elder statesman
- Ibrahim Zakzaky, Islamic preacher
- Adam A. Zango, Kannywood actor, musician, singer and dancer.
- Talib Zanna (born 1990), basketball player in the Israel Basketball Premier League,
- Eddy Wata, Eurodance artist.

== See also ==
- Railway stations in Nigeria
- Kaduna State
- National Ear Care Centre
