= Optometrists and Dispensing Opticians Registration Board of Nigeria =

- Abbreviation: ODORBN
- Formation: 1989; 37 years ago
- Type: Regulatory agency
- Purpose: To regulate the practice of optometry and dispensing opticianry in Nigeria
- Headquarters: Plot 5070/5071 Unity Estate, Karu Site, Karu, Abuja FCT 900101
- Location: Nigeria
- Coordinates: 9.0011°N 7.5695°E
- Official language: English
- Registrar/CEO: Dr. Obinna Edwin Awiaka
- Website: odorbn.gov.ng

The Optometrists and Dispensing Opticians Registration Board of Nigeria (ODORBN) is a government agency responsible for regulating the practice of optometry and dispensing opticianry in Nigeria. It was established by the Optometrists and Dispensing Opticians (Registration, etc.) decree of 1989, now cap 09 laws of the Federation of Nigeria 2004. The board evaluates training quality to ensure practitioners acquire the necessary knowledge and skills for their practice, while also ensuring that practitioners conduct themselves lawfully and professionally in their daily activities.

== History ==
The Optometrists and Dispensing Opticians Registration Board of Nigeria (ODORBN) was established by decree 34 of 1989 now cap 09 laws of the Federation of Nigeria 2004, to address the need for a regulatory framework and independence in the field of optometry and dispensing optics in Nigeria. The board is empowered to set standards, issue licences, and regulate the training and practice of optometrists and dispensing opticians across the country. The board's mission is to protect the Nigerian public by ensuring that quality eye care is carried out by skilled and competent professionals.

== Responsibilities ==
- Setting and maintaining standards: ODORBN determines and maintains standards of education, training, and professional conduct for optometrists and dispensing opticians. The board establishes and enforces ethical guidelines to govern the conduct of optometrists and dispensing opticians.
- Registration and licensure: ODORBN is responsible for issuing licences and registering qualified optometrists and dispensing opticians. The board keeps and maintains the register of qualified practitioners and publishes it periodically.
- Continuing professional development (CPD): ODORBN promotes ongoing education for practitioners through CPD opportunities, keeping them updated on advancements in eye care and optical technology.
- Regulatory compliance and discipline: ODORBN monitors professional conduct and takes disciplinary action against those who violate ethical standards or engage in malpractice.
- Examinations and accreditation: ODORBN conducts licensure examinations and assesses educational institutions offering optometry and dispensing optics programmes, ensuring they meet the required standards.
- Public education and awareness: ODORBN raises public awareness about the importance of eye care and the roles of optometrists and dispensing opticians. This includes providing information about common eye problems, offering guidance on how to find qualified professionals and protecting the public from quackery and unlawful practices.

== Governance and structure ==
The governing board of directors appointed by the president of Nigeria comprises a chairman, optometrists, dispensing opticians, academics, an ophthalmologist, an orthoptist, a public interest representative, a representative from the Medical and Dental Council of Nigeria, a representative from the Federal Ministry of Health and a representative from the National Eye Centre. The board is directly supervised by the Federal Ministry of Health. They oversee the agency's activities and ensure it fulfills its statutory mandates. The board of directors appoints a registrar who serves as the secretary and chief executive officer, managing the day-to-day operations of the board.

== See also ==
Nigerian Optometric Association
