= Asmau Ahmed =

Nigerian-American tech entrepreneur and beauty expert

- Born: 1983 (age 42–43); Kaduna, Nigeria
- Education: Bachelor of Science in Computer Engineering; Master of Science in Computer Science
- Occupations: entrepreneur and technology advocate
- Organization: Plum Perfect

Asmau Ahmed is a Nigerian-American entrepreneur, technology advocate, and beauty expert. She has promoted initiatives supporting women in technology and entrepreneurship.

== Early life and education ==
She was born in 1983 in Kaduna, Nigeria and spent her early childhood in West Africa and London. Ahmed earned a Bachelor of Science degree in Computer Engineering from the Rochester Institute of Technology in New York, USA, and a Master of Science degree in Computer Science from the Courant Institute of Mathematical Sciences at New York University. She also holds an MBA from Columbia Business School and a BS with Honors in Chemical Engineering from the University of Virginia.

== Career ==
Ahemd's journey first began in the late 1990's, when her mother built science labs for her out of their old laundry rooms between Nigeria and London. A young woman who had a dream to discover a new technology. In 2014, after Ahmed attained degrees and education she founded Plum Perfect, which is based a beauty technology company in New York City. The company's flagship product is a mobile app that uses facial recognition technology to analyze a user's skin tone and recommend the best makeup products. Plum Perfect was born out of Ahmed's frustration with challenges Black people face with shade-matching in the beauty industry. Ahmed also developed an education app called beauTV and Girl Seeks Sample program to help users get personalized makeup recommendations while watch makeup tutorials. Ahmed has licensed Plum Perfect's technology to IMAN Cosmetics. Plum Perfect has won numerous awards and has been featured in major media outlets such as Forbes, InStyle, and Essence.

Ahmed is an advocate for women in technology and entrepreneurship. She has spoken at various conferences and events, including the United Nations General Assembly, and has been recognized for her work with awards such as the Women in IT International's 2016 Global Leadership Award. She has also been recognized as a “Top Woman in Digital" by Cynopsis Media and “Black Business and Tech Professionals Changing the Game” by Huffington Post. Ahmed was recognized as one of “26 Women Of Color Diversifying Entrepreneurship In Silicon Valley, Media, And Beyond” by Vanity Fair for raising $1 million or more in outside capital as a woman entrepreneur. In 2016, Ahmed wrote a letter to the Society of Women Engineers' blog explaining her company Plum Perfect, while connecting to and offering advice for other women engineers.

In September 2025, Ahmed was hired at Varo Bank to be their first Chief Artificial Intelligence and Data Officer (CAIDO). Ahmed has over 20 years of experience in business and tech, ranging from her work developing technology at Google to her position as a mentor at All Race, helping women and non-binary individuals through the process of creating a business. Ahmed's position at google is the senior executive of the Creative Art Agency and is the president of the Yale Entrepreneurship Society. With this diverse portfolio she advocates for the youth at ivy league schools and is responsible for partnering with creators and sport talent. She is responsible for marketing collaborations between google and YouTube to promote brands and sports talents. She has experience at other companies like Capital One bank and Deloitte working in management highlighting her ability to adapt in any managerial position at a company.
