= Rigasa =

Human settlement in Kaduna State, Nigeria

Rigasa is a sub-urban settlement within a very close proximity to Kaduna metropolis, Kaduna, Nigeria. It is one of the largest and densely populated areas in Nigeria, with an estimate of three million inhabitants It hosts villages, such as Danmani, Nariya, Makera, Mashi, Hayin Malam Bello, Sabon-garin Rigasa, Makarfi Road, Kwate, Mai-giginya, among others. Covering about 14 by 8 kilometres, Rigasa is one of the 255 wards. The community has the largest public basic school in the sub-saharan Africa, initiated by his Excellency, Nasir Ahmed Elrufai. Also, it hosts the Kaduna-Abuja train station. It is believed that Rigasa hosts important dignitaries; such as the President of Universal Writers and Authors (UWA), Air Vice Marshal Maisaka (late), Former President of UWA, chairman, Igabi Local Government, not to mention several Associate Professors and Doctors who are currently living within the community. Before the 2000 Religion crisis in Kaduna state, different ethnic groups with diverse religious affiliation were living in Rigasa but presently, it is known as Hausa community.

== Climate condition ==
Rigasa has two weather conditions which are rainy and dry season.

== Market ==
Rigasa in Kaduna State has 1 market known as Yangwari Market located around PRP And Dan Madami street.

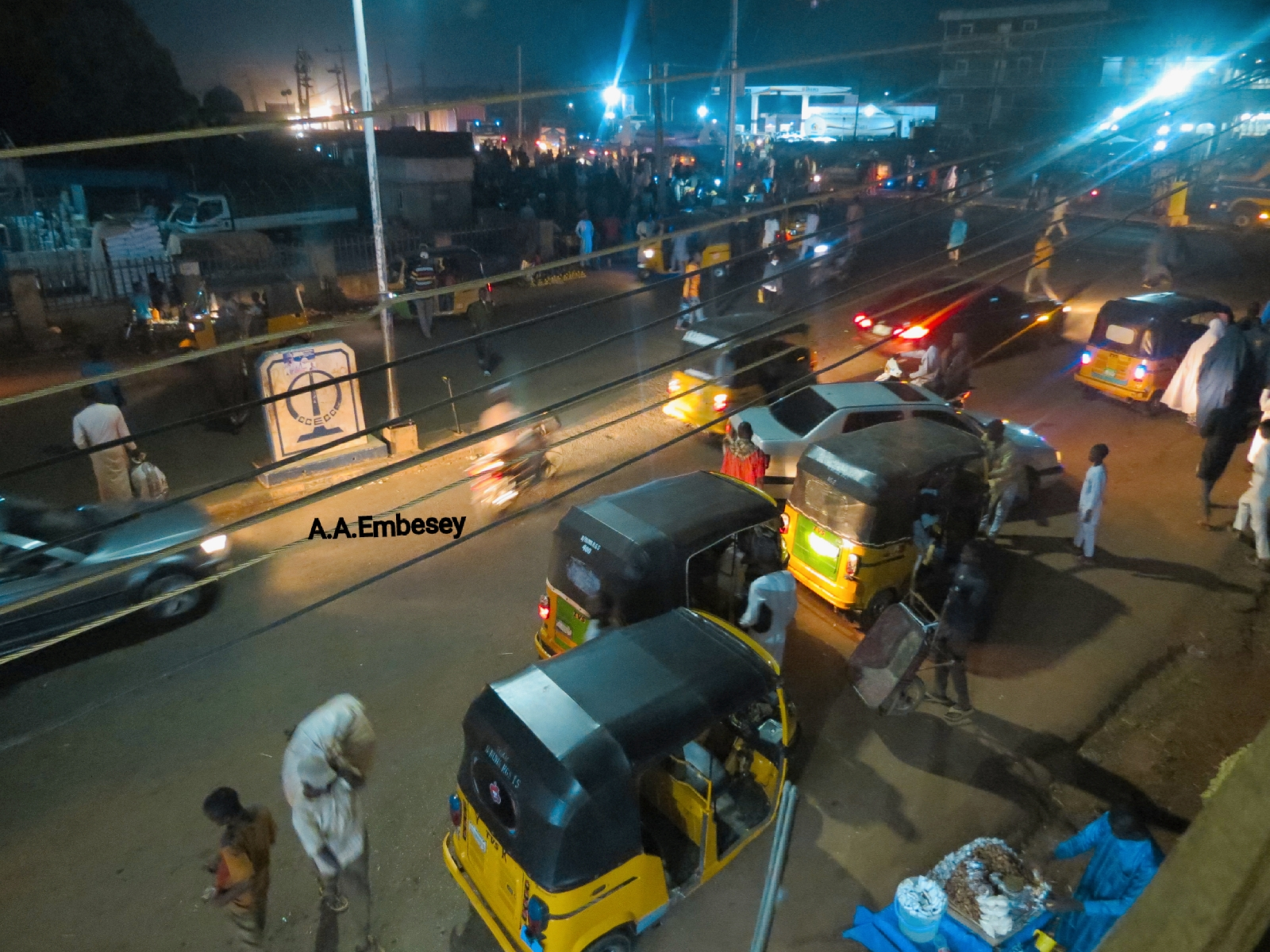
Road To Yangwari Market

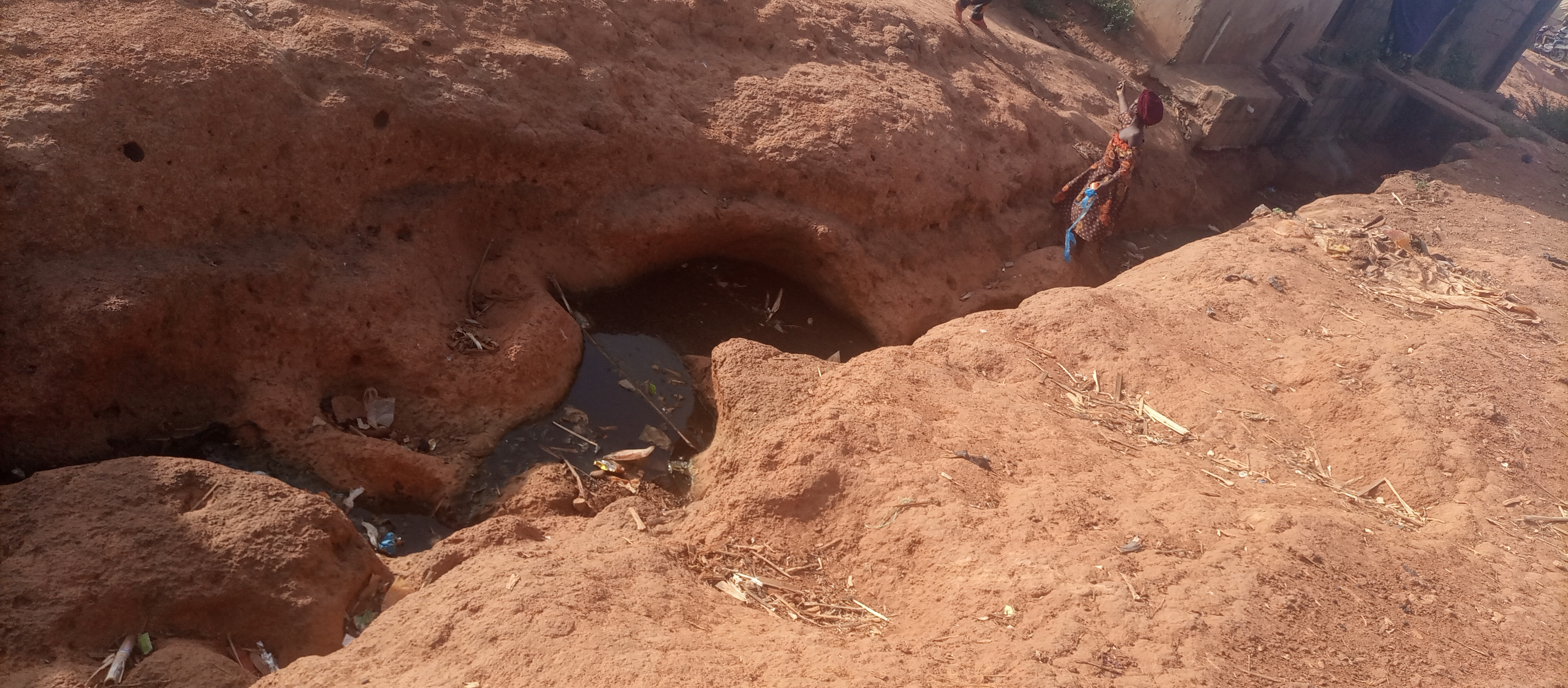
Rigasa Erosion.

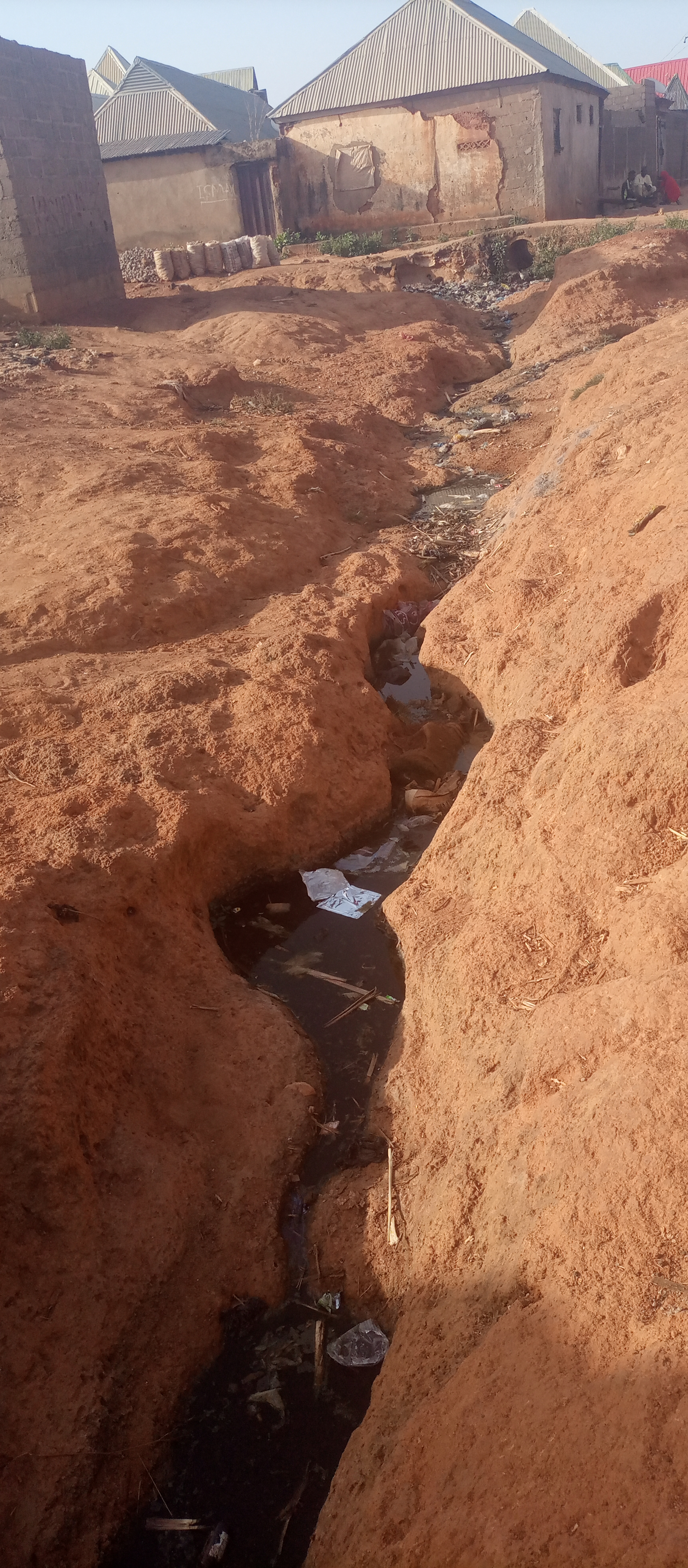
Rigasa Erosion

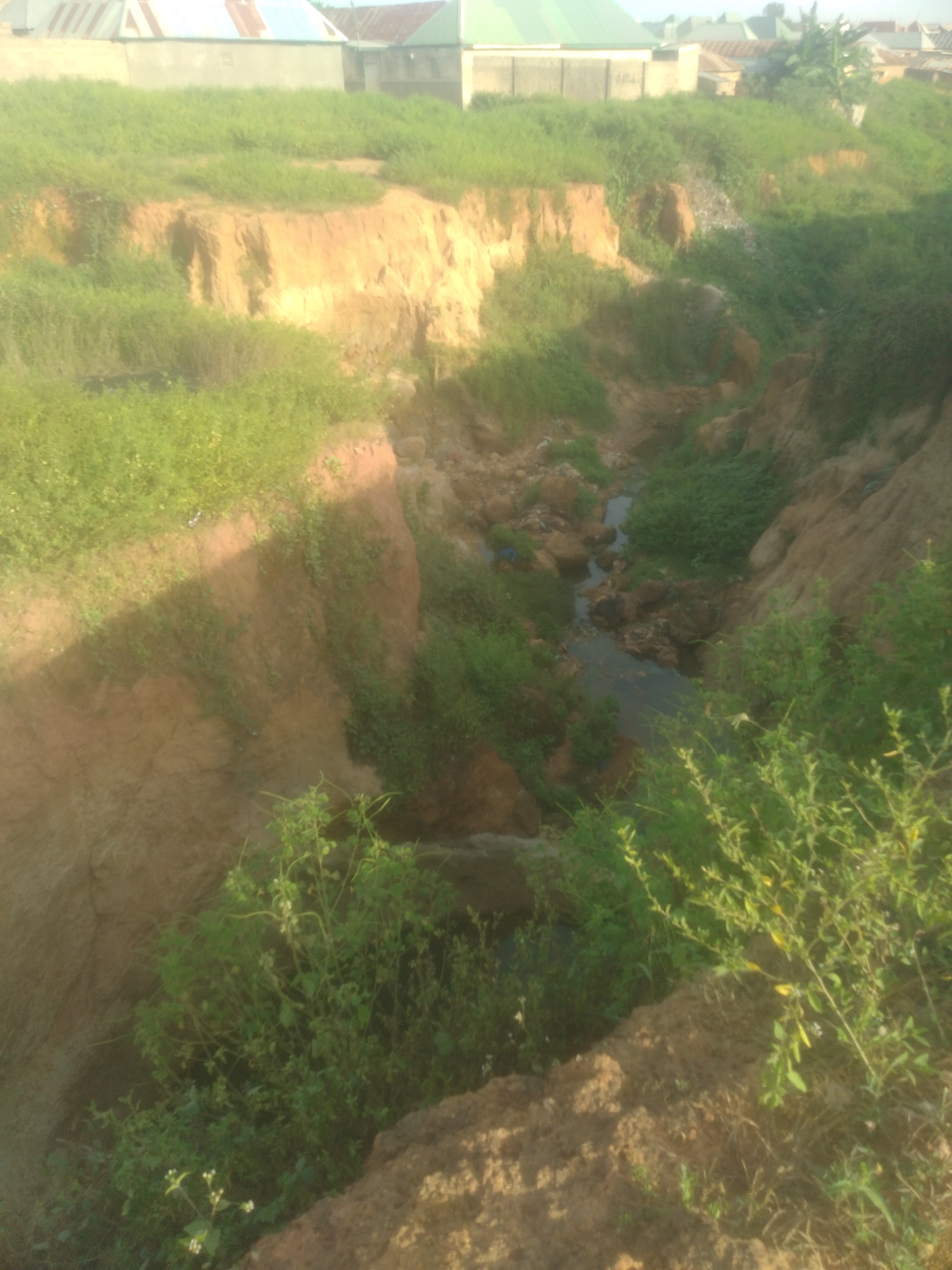
Erosion

== Education ==
Education in Rigasa faces challenges of infrastructural facilities in the sense that as big as the community, it has no more than three public primary schools and public secondary schools, where one of the schools in the area, L. E. A Primary School at Lokoja road has more than thirty thousand pupils, this school was later upgraded to 110 classrooms with 60 toilets and 14 staff rooms with their toilets Apart from Government Schools, there are several private schools in the areas that boost the education of children. Rigasa has several private schools that educate people in the community.

== Commercial activities ==
The Railway Station which is located in Rigasa is a terminal state that lead to Abuja. This terminal station boost the commercial activities in the area such as those selling items in the stations, some prominent people now visit the area for site seeing and travelers do traveled from Kaduna to Abuja on a daily bases. Petrol fuel stations and other businesses are moving ways in the area. Small scale business are the major activities of the people of Rigasa community.

== Secondary schools ==
- Umar Idris Government Junior Secondary School Rigasa, Igabi
- Government Junior Secondary School
- Al-qirah international academy

== Health care facilities ==
There are several private and public hospitals in Rigasa. which are:

1. Primary Health Centre also known as Meyetti Allah, located along Makarfi Road, Rigasa.
2. Rigasa General Hospital,
3. National Eye Centre (Kaduna) Rigasa, Igabi - Public.
4. MSK Specialist Hospital
5. Sultan Hospital
6. Nariya Primary Health Centre

== See also ==
- Rigasa Railway Station

== Gallery ==
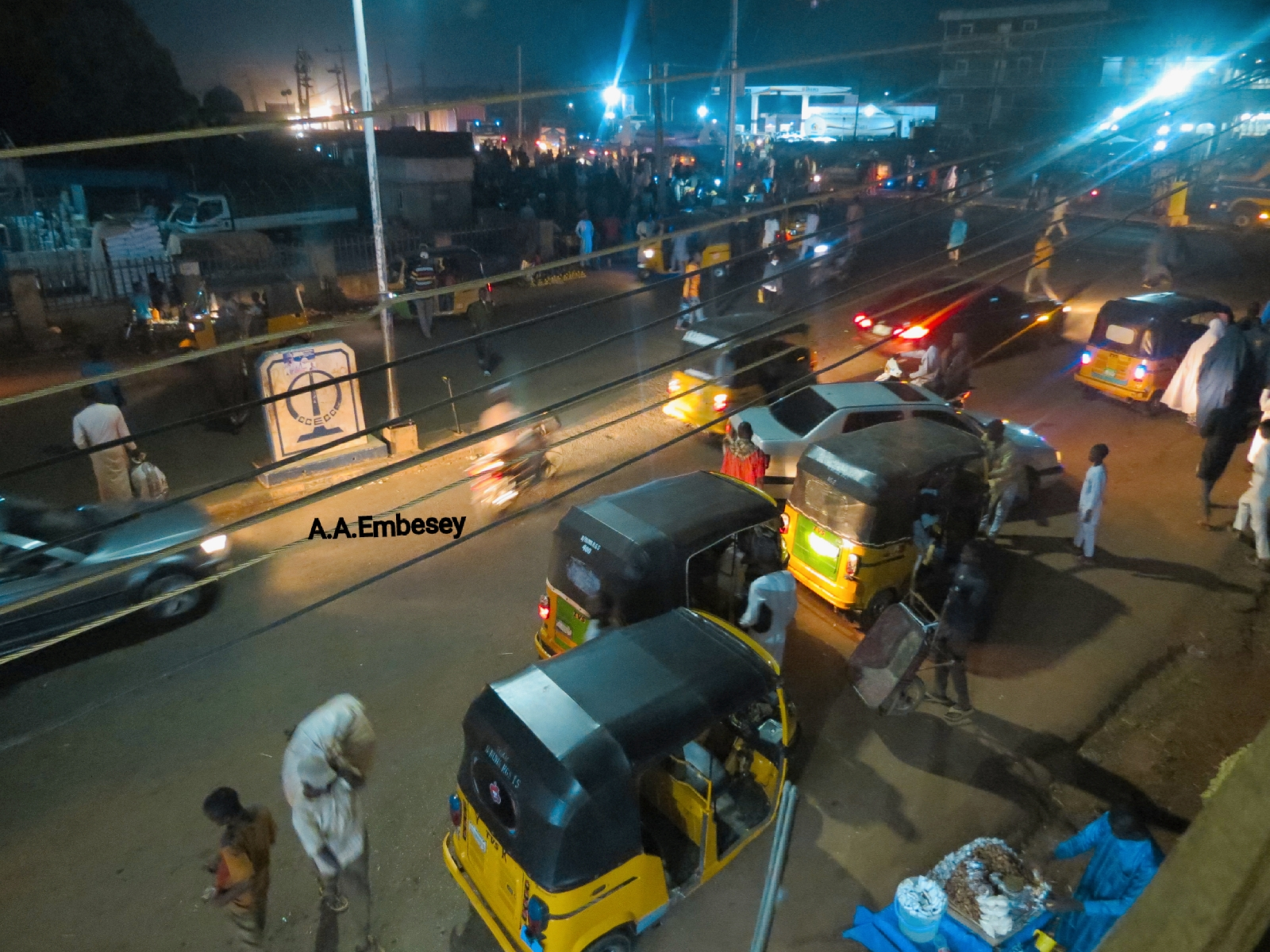

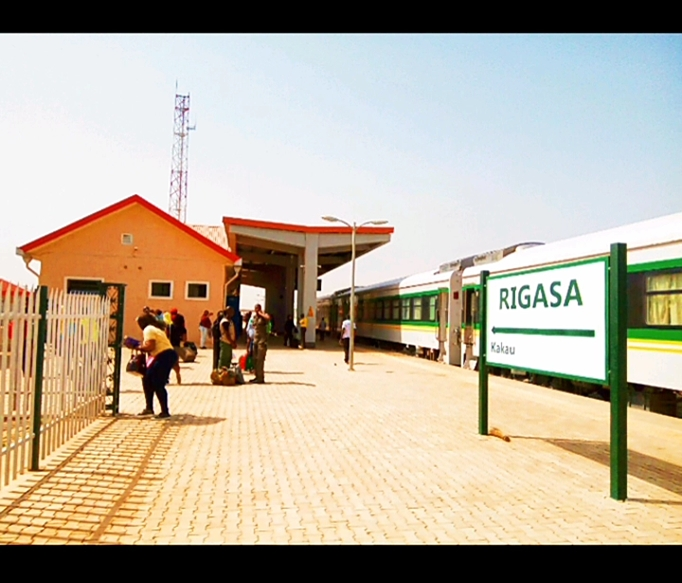

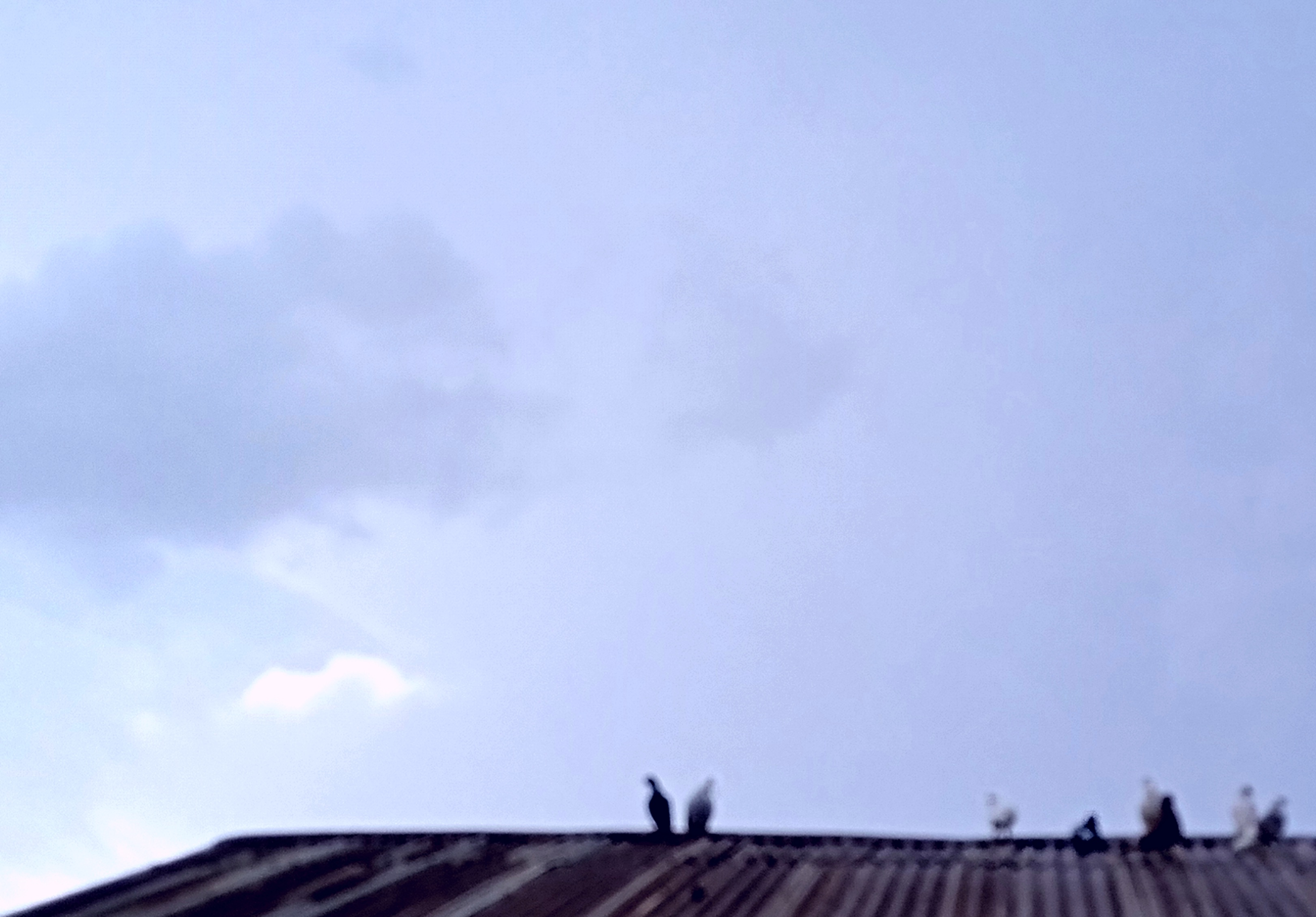

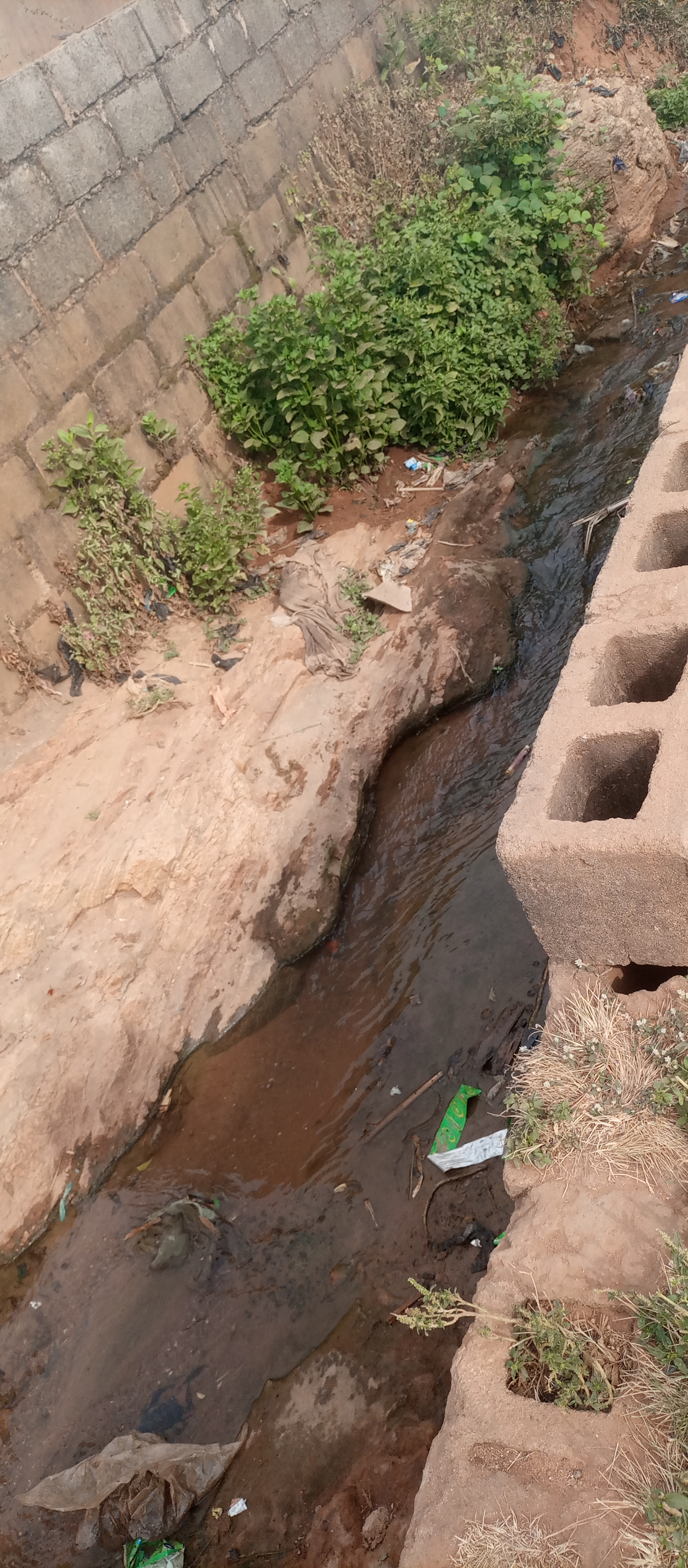

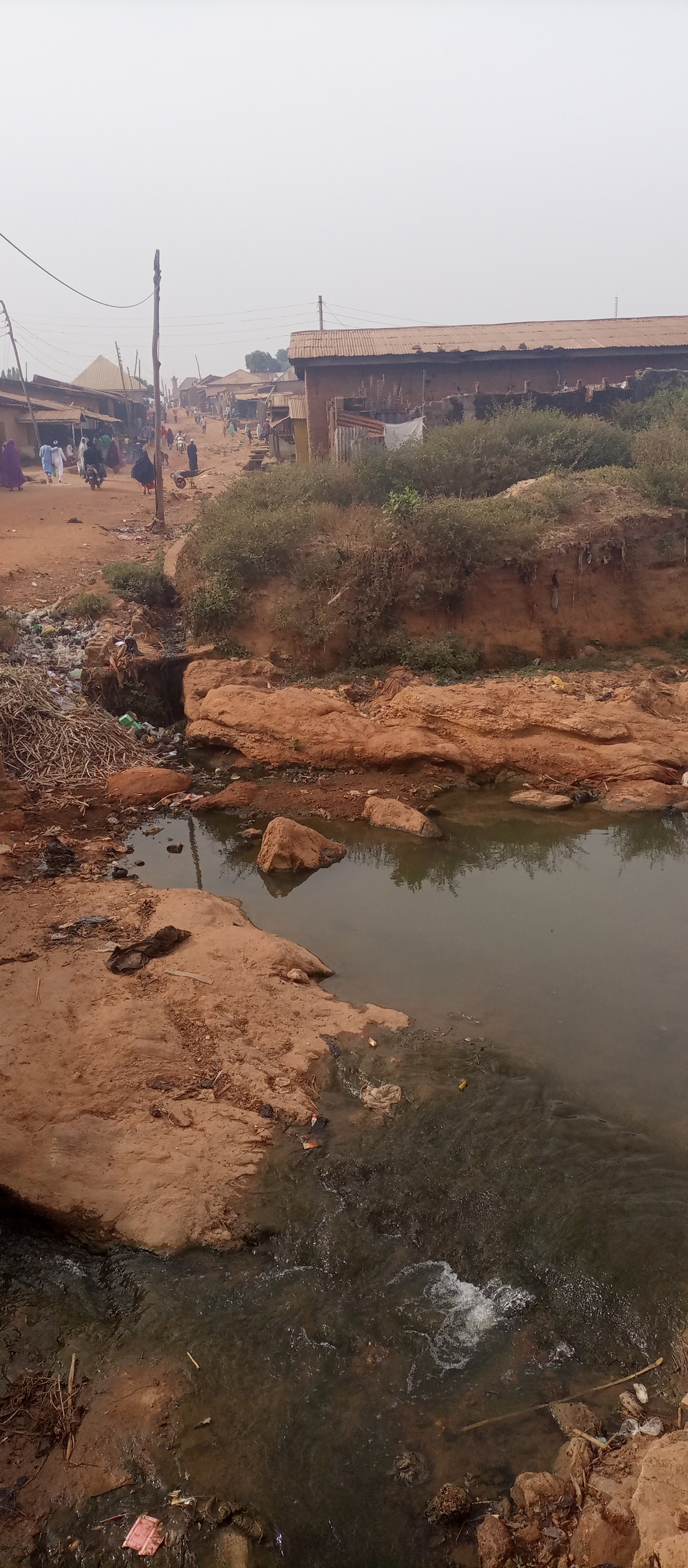

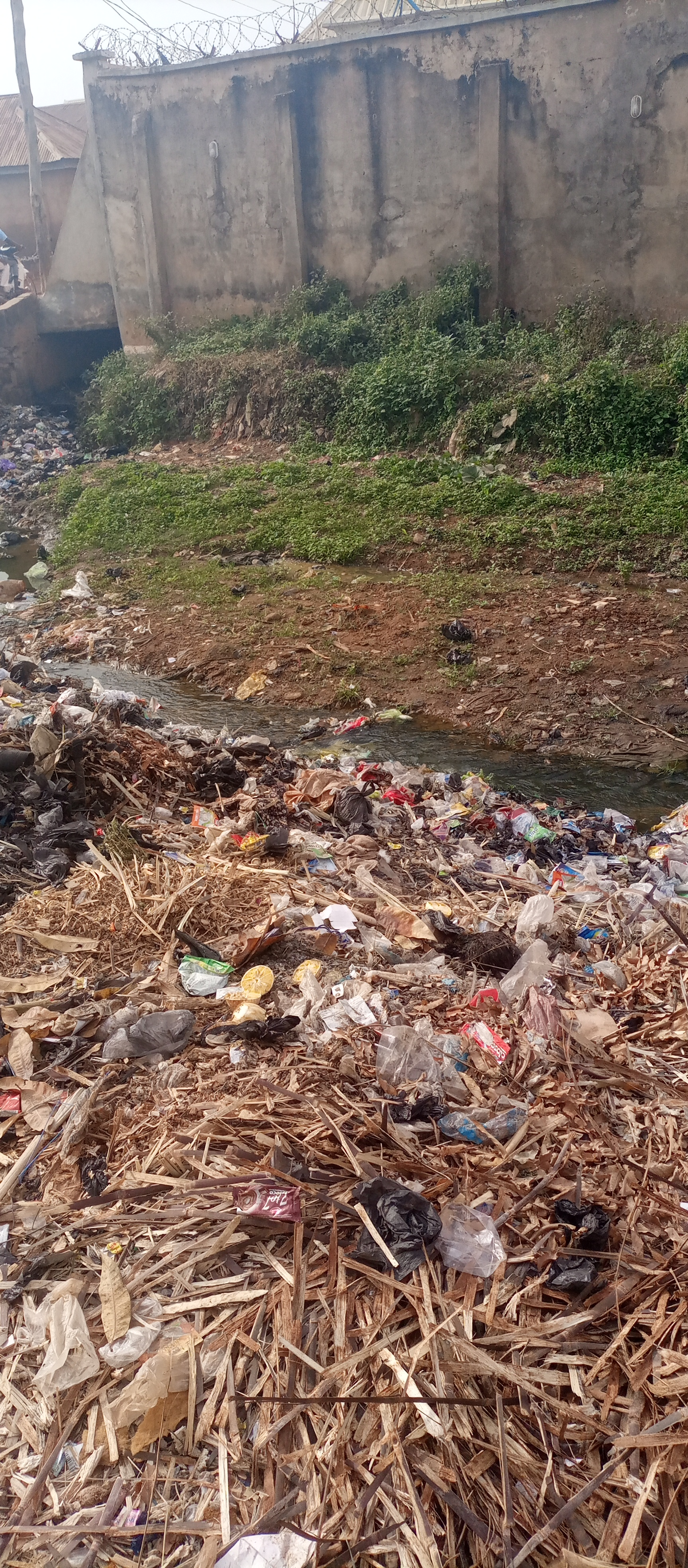

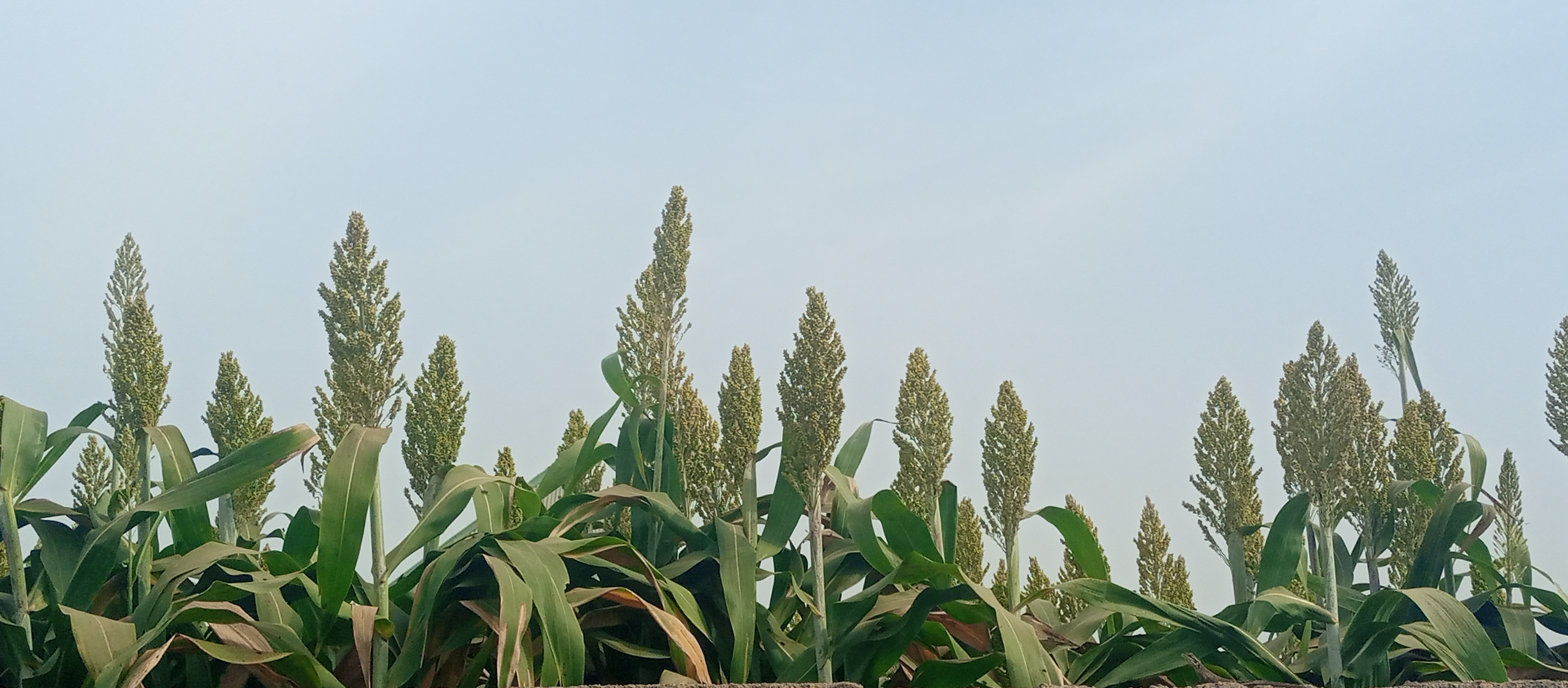

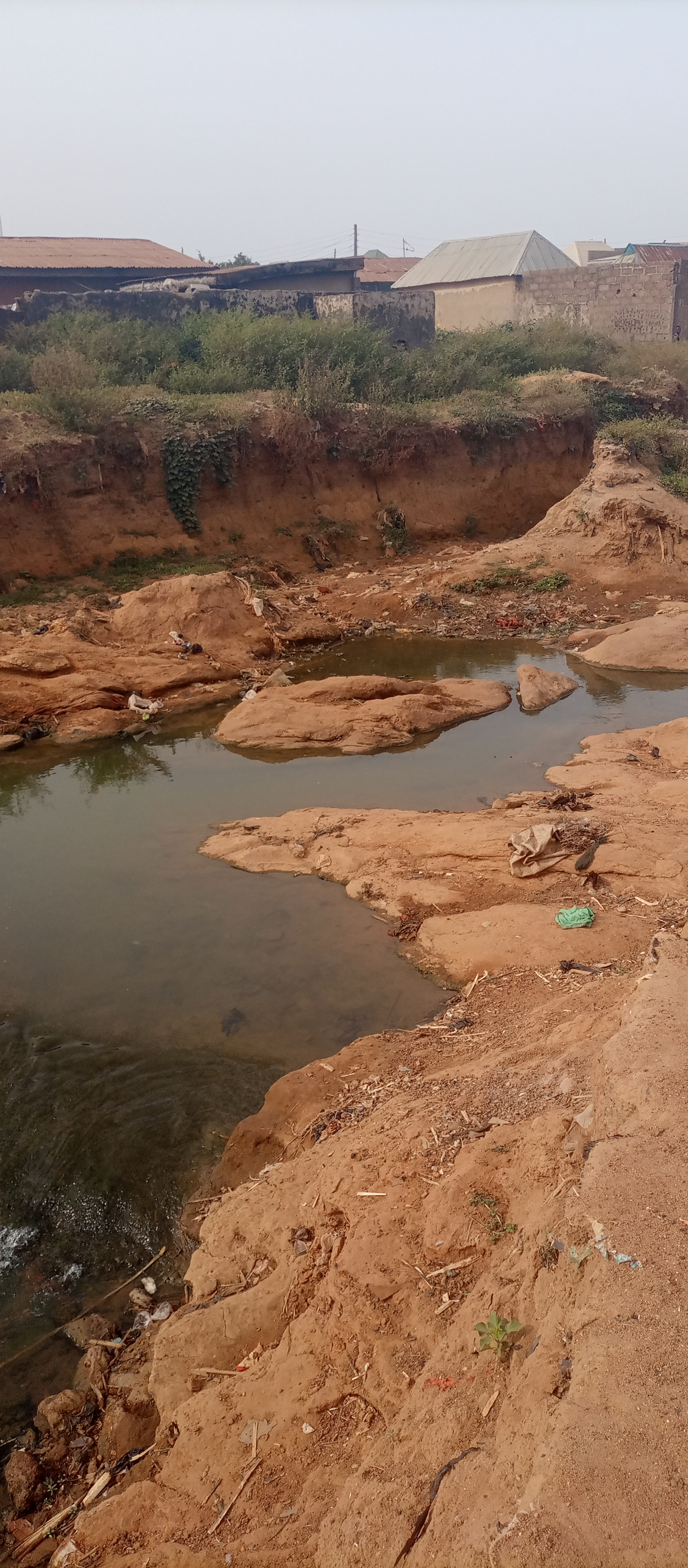

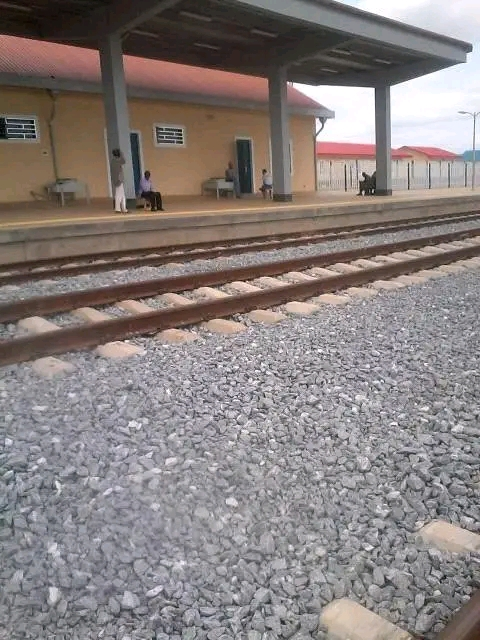
