= American Board of Opticianry =

The American Board of Opticianry (ABO) is a national professional organization dedicated to certifying opticians. It has a sister organization, known as the N.C.L.E.- National Contact Lens Examiners.
