= Optician =

Profession that makes or fits glasses

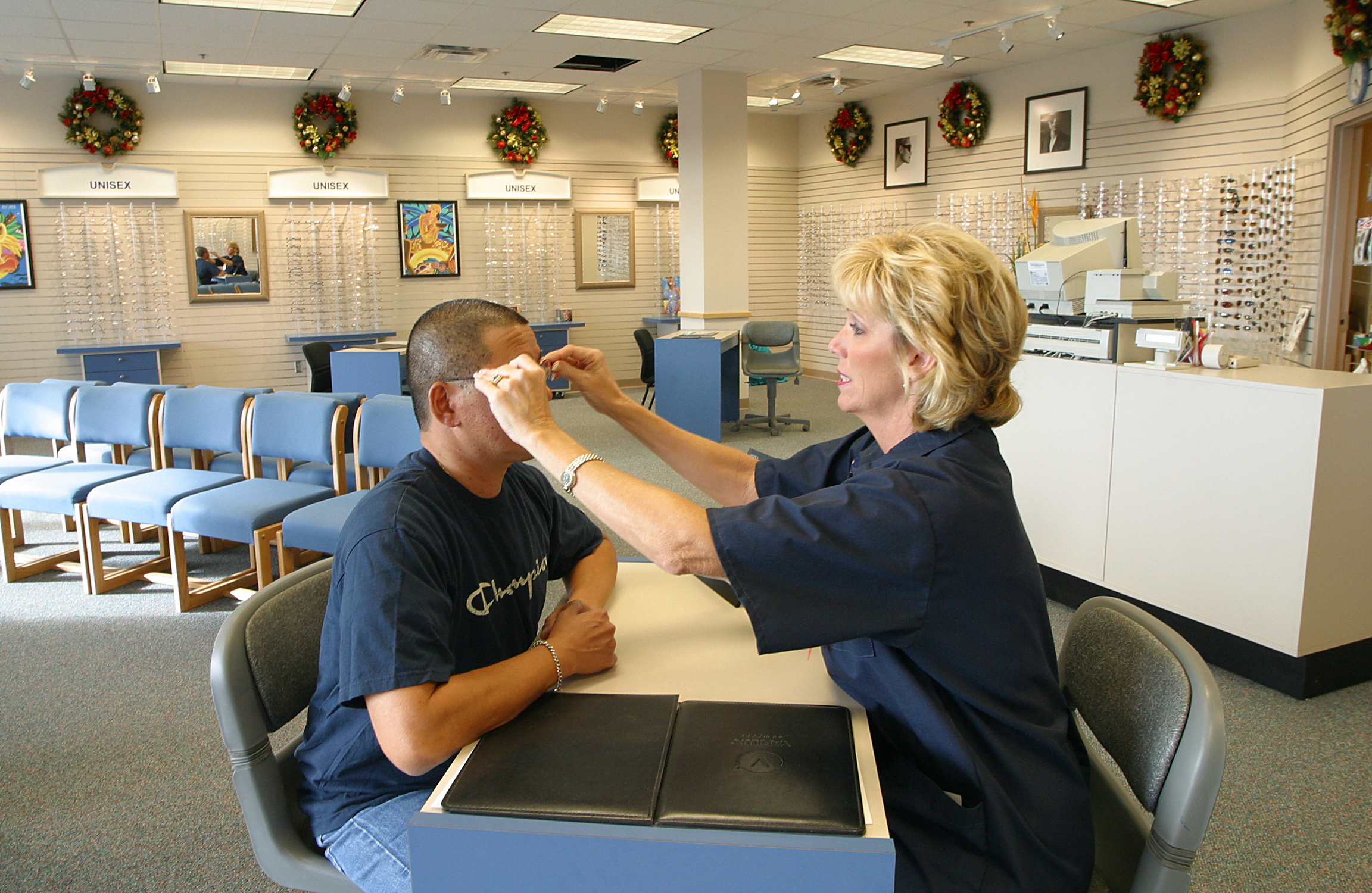
A US Navy optician adjusting a customer's glasses

An optician is an individual who fits glasses or contact lenses by filling a refractive prescription from an optometrist or ophthalmologist. They are able to translate and adapt ophthalmic prescriptions, dispense products, and work with accessories. There are several specialties within the field.

== Types ==
=== Dispensing optician or ophthalmic dispenser ===
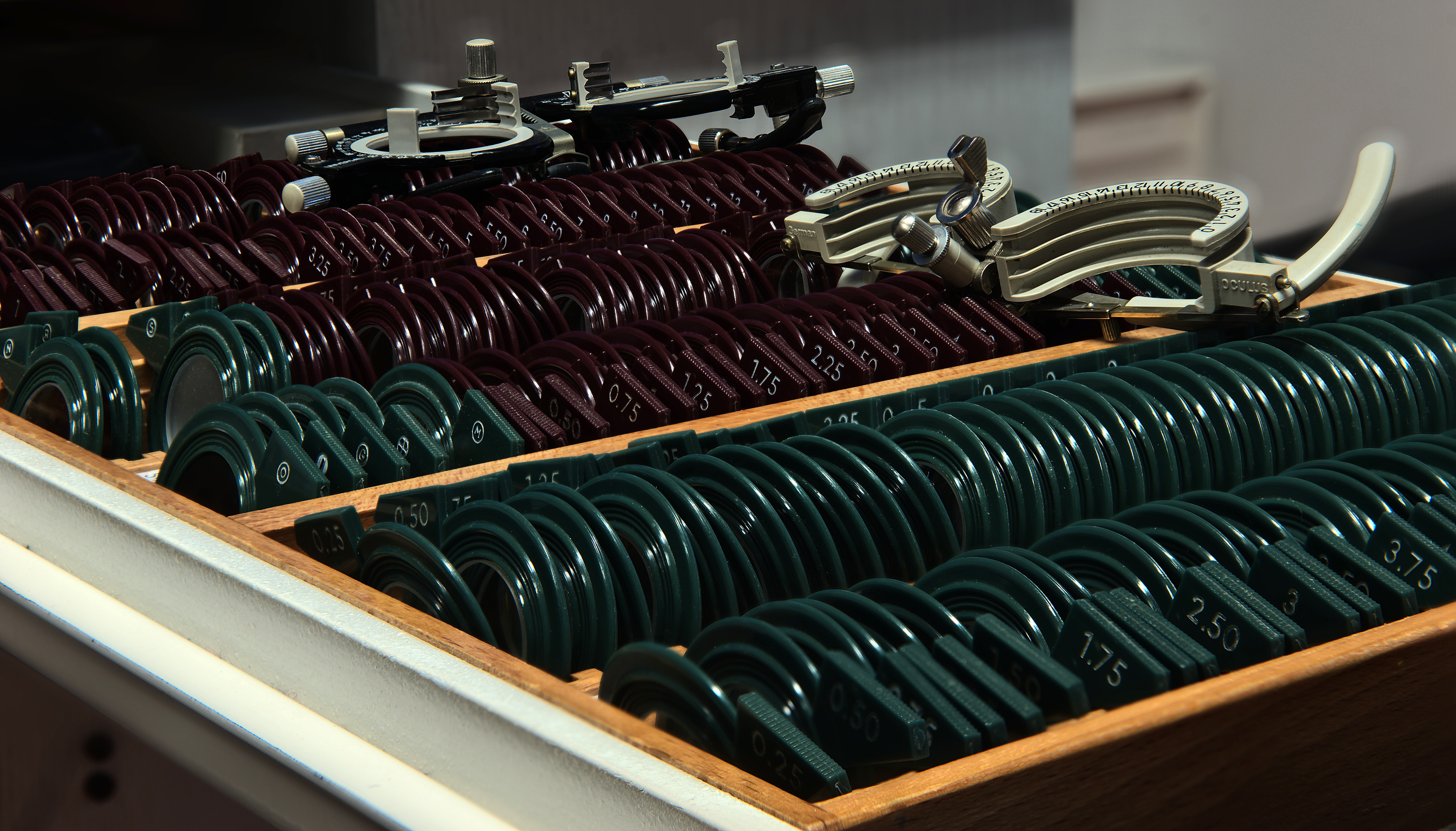
Trial frame and lenses

A dispensing optician is anyone who prepares, fits, and dispenses prescription lenses, spectacles, glasses, contact lenses, or any other type of vision-correcting optical device to the intended user. They may interpret optical prescriptions issued by an ophthalmologist, optometrist, or physician for the lab optician who fabricates vision-correcting optical lenses. They also measure inter-ocular or pupillary distances, vertex distances, pupil fitting heights, and frame angles to determine the proper position of vision-correcting lenses. In addition, they adapt, modify, or align frames with vision-correcting lenses to the face of the intended wearer, Dispensing opticians must have a basic knowledge of laboratory techniques such as lens surfacing and lens preparation.

=== Mechanical optician, lab optician, or ophthalmic lab technician ===
Ophthalmic laboratory technicians must understand optics and how to use machinery in order to surface, coat, edge, or finish lenses according to specifications provided by dispensing opticians. They typically insert lenses into frames, also called glazing, to produce finished glasses and conduct all quality and safety testing required by the respective local and country regulations. Although most lenses are designed with fully automated equipment, such as computer-based generators, automatic edgers, and lens measurement instruments, a highly-skilled lab optician will often finish lenses by hand for more difficult prescriptions and lens designs in order to have the best-finished outcome.

=== Contact lens fitter or contact lens technician ===
Contact lens fitters may work independently or under the direction of an ophthalmologist or optometrist to fill a doctor's prescription for contact lenses. A patient must obtain a prescription for contact lenses from a physician and then the fitter will review contact lens handling, fitting, and follow-up care. Contact lens fitters must have computer skills, communication skills, and an understanding of medical-legal implications.

=== Ocularist ===
An ocularist is a trained technician who specializes in fitting a patient with a prosthetic eye after management by an ophthalmologist. Ocularists are trained in assessing the status of the orbit, fabricating and fitting a cosmetic ocular prosthesis, and periodically monitoring the prosthesis and related tissues. They ensure the correct fitting, shaping, and painting of ocular prostheses. The ocularist also educates the patient on handling and care of the prosthesis. Ocularists provide long-term care through follow-up examinations for evaluation and polishing of prostheses.

== Work environment ==
=== Corporate practice ===
Corporate practices may require more night and weekend work hours than other work environments due to the longer hours of the corporate chains. Many who work for them report the trade-off is greater room for growth, higher pay, and better benefits due to the larger scale of the employer. Purchasing of goods is conducted by the corporate headquarters and not by individuals at the locations.

=== Independent practice ===
Owned by the optician themselves, opticians who operate independent practices have all of the responsibilities of an entrepreneur/business owner as well as an optician. In the United States, due to certain local and state regulations, opticians cannot employ optometrists in various areas and are limited in some vision discount plans they can accept.

=== Optometrist or ophthalmologist office ===
A smaller, more intimate environment than corporate or clinical, doctor-owned practices usually do not require as many evening or weekend hours as corporate locations; however, every medical office is different and will have a unique set of features and characteristics.

=== Hospitals and clinics ===
Opticians working in a hospital or clinic typically oversee patient care, administer treatment and operate medical equipment under the supervision of an ophthalmologist or optometrist.

=== Lab manufacturing ===
This role typically does not work directly with patients and it is centred around the use of high-tech equipment and hand-held tools.

== History of opticians and spectacle makers ==
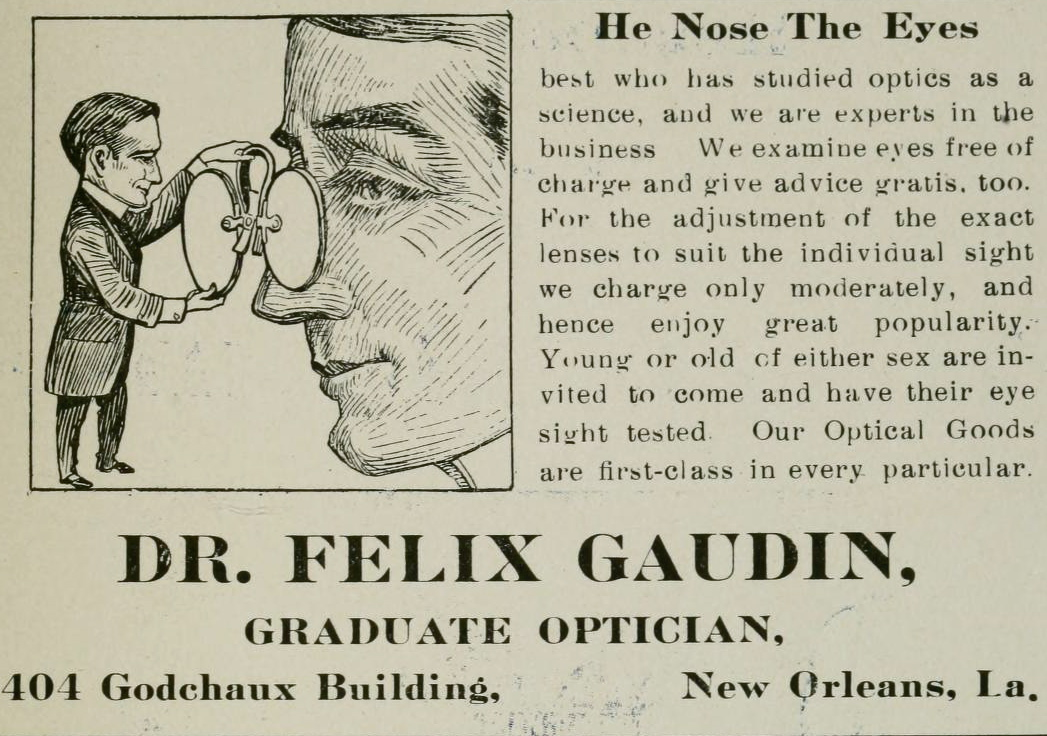
"He Nose The Eyes". 1910 advertisement for Dr. Felix Gaudin, "Graduate Optician", New Orleans

The first known artistic representation of glasses was painted by Tommaso da Modena in 1352. He did a sequence of frescoes of brothers efficiently reading or replicating manuscripts; one holds a magnifying glass while the other has glasses suspended on his nose. Once Tommaso had established the example, other painters positioned spectacles on the noses of many of subjects, almost certainly as a representation of wisdom and respect.

One of the most noteworthy developments in spectacle production in the 15th century was the introduction of concave lenses for the myopic or nearsighted. Pope Leo X, who was very myopic, wore concave spectacles when hunting and professed they enabled him to see clearer than his cohorts.

The first spectacles utilized quartz lenses since optical glass had not been developed. The lenses were set into bone, metal and leather mountings, frequently fashioned like two small magnifying glasses with handles riveted together and set in an inverted V shape that could be balanced on the bridge of the nose. The use of spectacles extended from Italy to Germany, Spain, France and Portugal.

From their inception, glasses posed a dilemma that wasn't solved for almost 350 years: how to keep them on the bridge of the nose without falling. Spanish spectacle makers of the 17th century experimented with ribbons of silk that could be attached to the frames and then looped over the ears. Spanish and Italian missionaries carried the new models to spectacle wearers in China. The Chinese attached little ceramic or metal weights to the strings instead of making loops. In 1730 a London optician named Edward Scarlett perfected the use of rigid sidepieces that rested atop the ears. This perfection rapidly spread across the continent. In 1752 James Ayscough publicized his latest invention, spectacles with double hinged side pieces. These became very popular and appear more often than any other kind in paintings and prints of the period. Lenses were fabricated of tinted glass as well as clear. Ayscough felt that the clear glass lenses gave an unpleasant glare. In Spain in 1763 Pablo Minguet recommended turquoise, green, or yellow lenses but not amber or red.

Europeans, in particular the French, were self-conscious about the use of glasses. Parisian aristocrats used reading aids only in private. The gentry of England and France used a "perspective glass” or monocular which could be concealed from view easily. In Spain, however, spectacles were popular amongst all classes since they considered glasses made them look more important and dignified.

Far-sighted or aging colonial Americans imported spectacles from Europe. Spectacles were primarily for the affluent and literate colonists, who required a valuable and precious appliance. Benjamin Franklin in the 1780s developed the bifocals. Bifocal lenses advanced little in the first half of the 19th century. The terms bifocal and trifocal were introduced in London by John Isaac Hawkins, whose trifocals were patented in 1827. In 1884 B. M. Hanna was granted patents on two forms of bifocals which become commercially standardized as the "cemented" and "perfection" bifocals. Both had the serious faults of ugly appearance, fragility, and dirt-collection at the dividing line. At the end of the 19th century the two sections of the lens were fused instead of cemented At the turn of the 20th century, there was a considerable increase in the use of bifocals.

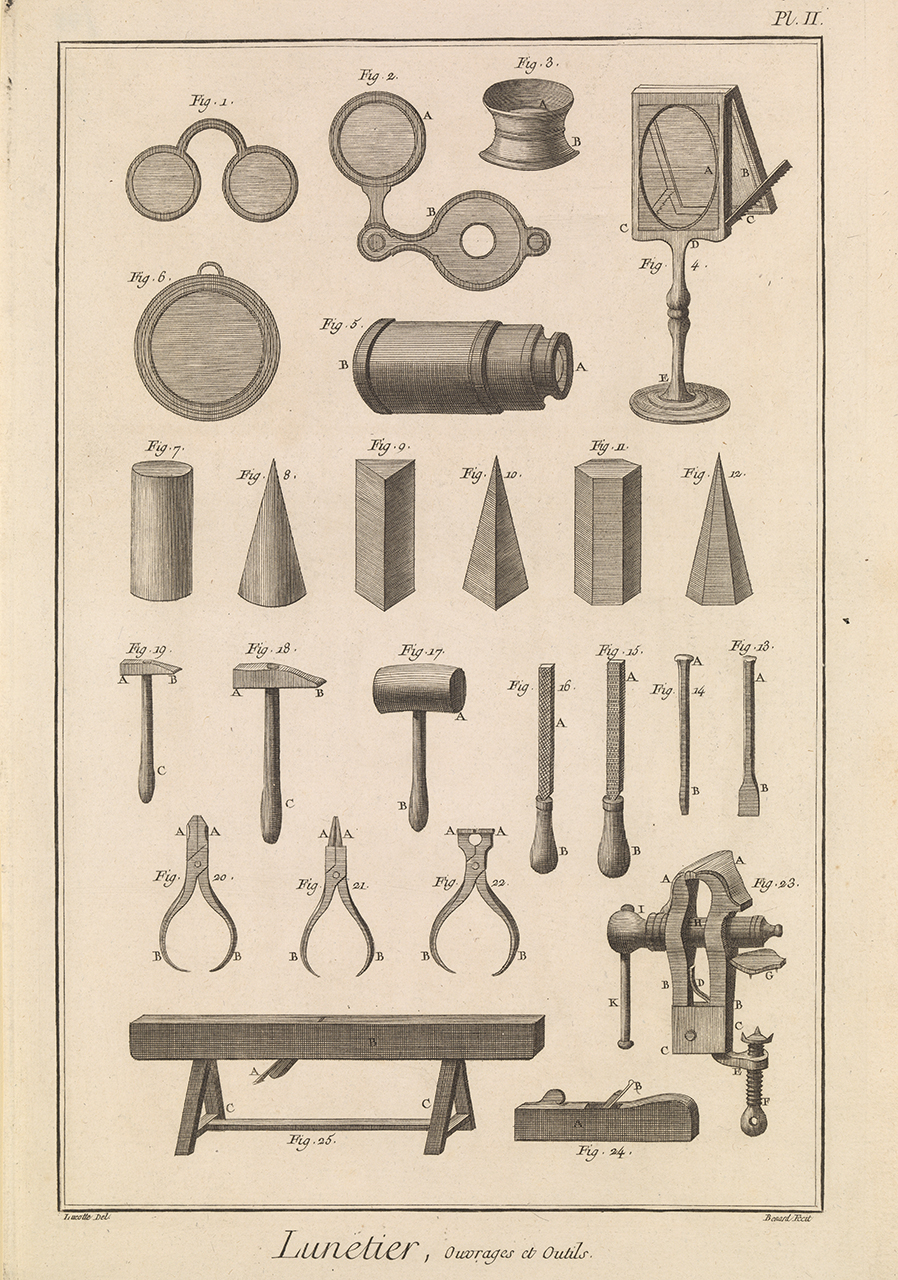
Plate illustrating opticians' tools and the products of their work, including spectacles and a spyglass

Between 1781 and 1789, silver spectacles with sliding extension temples were being fabricated in France; however it was not until the 19th century that they gained extensive popularity. John McAllister of Philadelphia began fabricating spectacles with sliding temples containing looped ends which were much easier to use with the then-popular wigs. The loops supplement the inadequacy of stability, by allowing the addition of a cord or ribbon which could be tied behind the head, thus holding the glasses firmly in place.

In 1826, William Beecher moved to Massachusetts from Connecticut to establish a jewellery-optical manufacturing shop. The first ophthalmic pieces he fabricated were silver spectacles, which were later followed by blue steel. In 1869 the American Optical Company was incorporated and acquired the holdings of William Beecher. In 1849 J. J. Bausch immigrated to the United States from Germany. He had already served an apprenticeship as an optician in his native land and had found work in Berne. His reimbursement for the labour on a complete pair of spectacles was equal to six cents. Mr. Bausch encountered difficult times in America from 1849 until 1861, at which time war broke out. When the war prevented import of glass frames, demand for his hard rubber frames skyrocketed. Continuous expansion followed and the large Bausch and Lomb Company was formed.

The monocle, which was first called an "eye-ring", was initially introduced in England in the early 19th century; although it had been developed in Germany during the 18th century. A young Austrian named Johann Friedrich Voigtländer studied optics in London and took the monocle idea back to Germany with him. He started making monocles in Vienna about 1814 and the fashion spread and took particularly strong roots in Germany and in Russia. The first monocle wearers were upper-class gentlemen, which may account for the aura of arrogance the monocle seemed to confer on the wearer. After World War I, the monocle fell into disrepute, its downfall in the allied sphere hastened, no doubt, by its association with the German military.

The lorgnette, two lenses in a frame the user held with a lateral handle, was another 18th-century development (by Englishman George Adams). The lorgnette almost certainly developed from the scissors-glass, which was a double glass on a handle. Given that the two branches of the handle came together under the nose and looked as if they were about to cut it off, they were known as binocles-ciseaux or scissors glasses. The English altered the size and form of the scissors-glasses and produced the lorgnette. The frame and handle were often artistically embellished, given that they were used mostly by women and more often as a piece of jewellery than as a visual aid. The lorgnette maintained its popularity with ladies of fashion, who chose not to wear spectacles. The lorgnette maintained its popularity to the end of the 19th century.

Pince-nez are believed to have appeared in the 1840s, but in the latter part of the century there was a great upsurge in the popularity of the pince-nez for both men and women. Gentlemen wore any style which suited them—heavy or delicate, round, or oval, straight, or drooping—usually on a ribbon, cord, or chain about the neck or attached to the lapel. Ladies more often than not wore the oval rimless style on a fine gold chain which could be reeled automatically into a button-size eyeglass holder pinned to the dress. Whatever the disadvantage of the pince-nez, it was convenient.

In the 19th century, the responsibility of choosing the correct lens lay, as it always had, with the customer. Even when the optician was asked to choose, it was often on a rather casual basis. Spectacles were still available from travelling salesmen.

Spectacles with round lenses (like Winston Churchill), oval shape, panto shape, and tortoise shell frames became the fashion around 1930. The round spectacles and the pince-nez continued to be worn in the 30. In the 40s there was increased emphasis on style in glasses with a variety of spectacles available. Meta Rosenthal wrote in 1938 that the pince-nez was still being worn by dowagers, headwaiters, old men, and a few others. The monocle was worn by only a minority in the United States. Sunglasses, however, became very popular in the late '30s.

== Equipment ==
Opticians use a variety of equipment to fit, adjust and dispense eyewear, contact lenses, and low-vision aids.

=== Manual lensometer ===
Technically identified by the generic term manual lensometer, opticians may often refer to this piece of equipment as a lensometer, focimeter, or vertometer. The modern lensometer was invented in 1922 by Edgar Derry Tillyer of American Optical to determine "whether lenses have the refraction and power prescribed." Proper use of the lensometer by a dispensing optician or a lab optician includes verifying back or front vertex power, orientating uncut lenses for finishing and glazing, and confirming the mounting of lenses into the frame. Manual lensometers can also be outfitted with an attachment to read the back vertex power of a contact lens for modification and verification purposes.

The optician uses the refracted, or bent light, displayed within a lensometer to interpret the sphere, cylinder, and add powers (if prescribed), axis orientation, prismatic effect, and locate the major reference point of the lens. Correct interpretation of these readings is critical to the performance of the eyewear and user satisfaction.

=== Automated lensometer ===
An automated lensometer uses the reflected wavelength of green light off of the lens surface along every lens meridian in order to determine all of the data points that the optician interprets with the manual lensometer. The benefits of an automated lensometer are increased speed, adjustments for variables in the index of refraction in the lens material, the ability to measure UV and light transmittance, and a decrease in training time while on the job. The drawbacks of automated lensometers in comparison to manual lensometers are greater difficulty identifying higher prismatic errors, aberrations, and surfacing power errors (optic waves), and the necessity of the optician not to tip the lens to avoid an erroneous result.

=== Corneal reflex pupilometer ===
A corneal reflex pupilometer is a digital device used to measure Interpupillary Distance (IPD), otherwise known as Pupillary Distance (PD). The measurement is used to align the Major Reference Point (MRP) of the lenses along the visual axis to reduce unwanted prismatic effect, eyestrain, and lens aberrations.

A PD can be taken Binocularly (from the corneal reflex of one pupil to the corneal reflex of the other) or Monocularly (from the centre of the spectacle bridge to the centre of the corneal reflex of each eye independently with the non-measured eye being occluded). By providing a rest point on the bridge similar to a glasses frame, pupilometers provided a proper reference point for obtaining an accurate monocular PD value.

PDs are also taken in relation to focus point. The eyes can be focused at infinity (distance), focused near (approximately 16 inches or 40 centimetres), or intermediate (a working distance in between near and distance. Because a pupilometer can be dialed to a specific distance and easily occluded, it is often easier to work with. This does not mean that it is more accurate than a skilled optician with a corneal reflex light, a millimeter ruler called a PD stick, and fully adjusted eyewear for certain age groups and pathologies. While a ruler alone is susceptible to parallax error, when it is used in conjunction with the other tools previously mentioned the accuracy can exceed the pupilometer for these certain patient groups

The fitting and dispensing of contact lenses requires the use of additional equipment, all with very specific purposes. A keratometer is a diagnostic instrument for measuring the curvature of the anterior surface of the cornea, particularly for assessing the extent and axis of astigmatism. It was invented by the French ophthalmologist Samuel Hankins in 1880. Opticians, like ophthalmologists and optometrists, also use a slit-lamp/bio-microscope to examine the anterior segment, or frontal structures and posterior segment, of the human eye, which includes the eyelid, sclera, conjunctiva, iris, natural crystalline lens, and cornea. The binocular slit-lamp examination provides stereoscopic magnified view of the eye structures in detail, enabling anatomical diagnoses to be made for a variety of eye conditions.

While a patient is seated in the examination chair, he rests his chin and forehead on a support to steady the head. Using the biomicroscope, the optician then proceeds to examine the patient's eye. A fine strip of paper, stained with fluorescein, a fluorescent dye, may be touched to the side of the eye; this stains the tear film on the surface of the eye to aid examination. The dye is naturally rinsed out of the eye by tears. Adults need no special preparation for the test; however children may need some preparation, depending on age, previous experiences, and level of trust.

The list of equipment used by an optician is extensive and is often specified in jurisdiction specific Professional Standards of Practice. The standards of the College of Opticians of British Columbia serve as an example.

== By country ==
=== Canada ===
All provinces in Canada require opticians to complete formal training and education in opticianry and then must pass competency examinations prior to receiving governmental licensure. Some provinces (Ontario and Quebec) require a single optician's license that includes both the dispensing of glasses and contact lenses, while the other provinces have two separate licenses, one each for glasses and contact lens dispensing.

Recent changes to the British Columbia Opticians regulations allow qualified opticians in that province to test a person's vision and prepare an assessment of the corrective lenses required for a client. Using the results of the assessment an optician is able to prepare and dispense glasses or contact lenses. Opticians in Alberta and Ontario are also permitted, under certain conditions, to refract and prepare and dispense glasses and contact lenses.

==== Provincial regulatory organizations ====
Each Canadian province has its own regulatory College or Board that provides registration or licensure to its opticians. The Regulatory body (often known as a ‘College’ but separate from, and not to be confused with, an educational institute) has a government mandate to protect the public. This includes enforcement of provincial statutes (Opticians Act) and public awareness campaigns.

==== The National Association of Canadian Opticianry Regulators (NACOR) ====
The National Association of Canadian Opticianry Regulators (NACOR) is an organization of all the provincial opticianry regulatory bodies in Canada (except Quebec). NACOR also administers Canada's national opticianry examination(s). Since 2001, all jurisdictions (except Quebec) have agreed to and signed, the Mutual Recognition Agreement among Opticianry Regulators that ensures labour mobility to all opticians across the entire nation without need for further examination. All provinces (with the exception of Quebec) require individuals to achieve a passing mark in a national examination as a requirement of licensure as an optician.

Despite the non participation of Quebec in National initiatives, Canadian opticians who relocate to Quebec are able to register and practice in that province provided they meet certain language requirements.

==== Provincial associations ====
Most Canadian provinces have their own provincial opticianry associations that look after the interests of their members at the provincial level, such as advocacy. Some provincial regulatory agencies have a dual role or purpose and also serve as the association for that province. In addition to protecting their member's interests, provincial associations also undertake public interest initiatives such as providing vision screening for children in schools, or organizing professional development seminars.

Established in 1989, the Opticians Association of Canada is a national organization of all provincial Opticianry Associations in Canada. The role of the OAC is to advocate for the various interests of opticians on a national basis.

==== Education ====
As a prerequisite for registration in any province of Canada opticians are required to complete a course at one of the NACOR accredited teaching institutions. Persons from an international jurisdiction may apply to a provincial regulatory agency for an assessment of equivalency of their education. Such applications are not unreasonably denied.

=== Nigeria ===
Dispensing Opticians are regulated by the Optometrists and Dispensing Opticians Registration Board of Nigeria (ODORBN). The training programme is a 3-year diploma programme in a Board accredited institution, located in all geopolitical zones of the nation. Some of the training institutions include Kwara State College of Health Technology (Offa), Federal Polytechnic (Nekede), and Millennium College of Health Technology.

=== United Kingdom ===
Opticians or Dispensing Opticians are regulated by the General Optical Council (GOC). A dispensing optician advises on, fits and supplies the most appropriate spectacles after taking account of each patient's visual, lifestyle and vocational needs. Dispensing opticians also play an important role in fitting contact lenses and advising and dispensing low vision aids to those who are partially sighted and in advising on and dispensing to children where appropriate.

The Association of British Dispensing Opticians (ABDO) is the qualifying body for dispensing opticians in the United Kingdom (UK). The Fellow of British Dispensing Opticians (FBDO) is the base qualification for UK dispensing opticians. This qualification has been awarded level 6 status (equivalent to BSc) by Ofqual Welsh Assembly Government and Council for Curriculum Examinations and Assessment (CCEA). Additional qualifications, Contact Lenses and Low Vision have been assessed at level 7 (equivalent to an MSc).

=== United States ===
In the United States, an optician, through testing, may be certified by the American Board of Opticianry (ABO) to fill the prescription ordered by an ophthalmologist or optometrist. Note: The ABO Exam is not nationally recognized and does not indicate a license to practice as an optician. In roughly half the states, licensing is not a requirement to make or dispense eyewear. Many eye doctors do their own dispensing, and it is frequent for eye clinics to have an optician on their premises; or, conversely, for large optical chains to have optometrists in offices on their premises.

Some opticians learn their skills through formal training programs. Professional technical schools and two-year colleges offer programs in opticianry. Two-year programs usually grant an associate degree. One-year programs offer a certificate. Training usually includes courses in optical math, optical physics, and tools and equipment use. Other opticians can apprentice to learn the required skills. Many formal education programs will accept hours worked as an apprentice to supplement or replace course credits, as well.

==== United States Organizations That Impact Opticianry on a National Level ====
Association	Website
Opticians Association of America	http://www.oaa.org/
The Commission on Opticianry Accreditation	http://www.coaccreditation.com/
American Board of Opticianry	https://www.abo-ncle.org/
National Contact Lens Examiners	https://www.abo-ncle.org/
Contact Lens Society of America	https://www.clsa.info/
National Federation of Opticianry Schools	http://www.nfos.org/
American Society of Ocularists	https://www.ocularist.org/
The Vision Council	http://www.thevisioncouncil.org/

== Notable opticians ==
- Euclid of Alexandria
- Roger Bacon
- Christiaan Huygens
- Isaac Newton
- René Descartes
- Benedictus Spinoza
- James Ayscough
- Carl Laubman
- John Jacob Bausch
- Henry Lomb
- Eugene Kalt
- Achim Leistner

== See also ==
- Ophthalmologist
- Optometrist
- Scientific equipment optician
