= James Ayscough =

English optician and designer and maker of scientific instruments

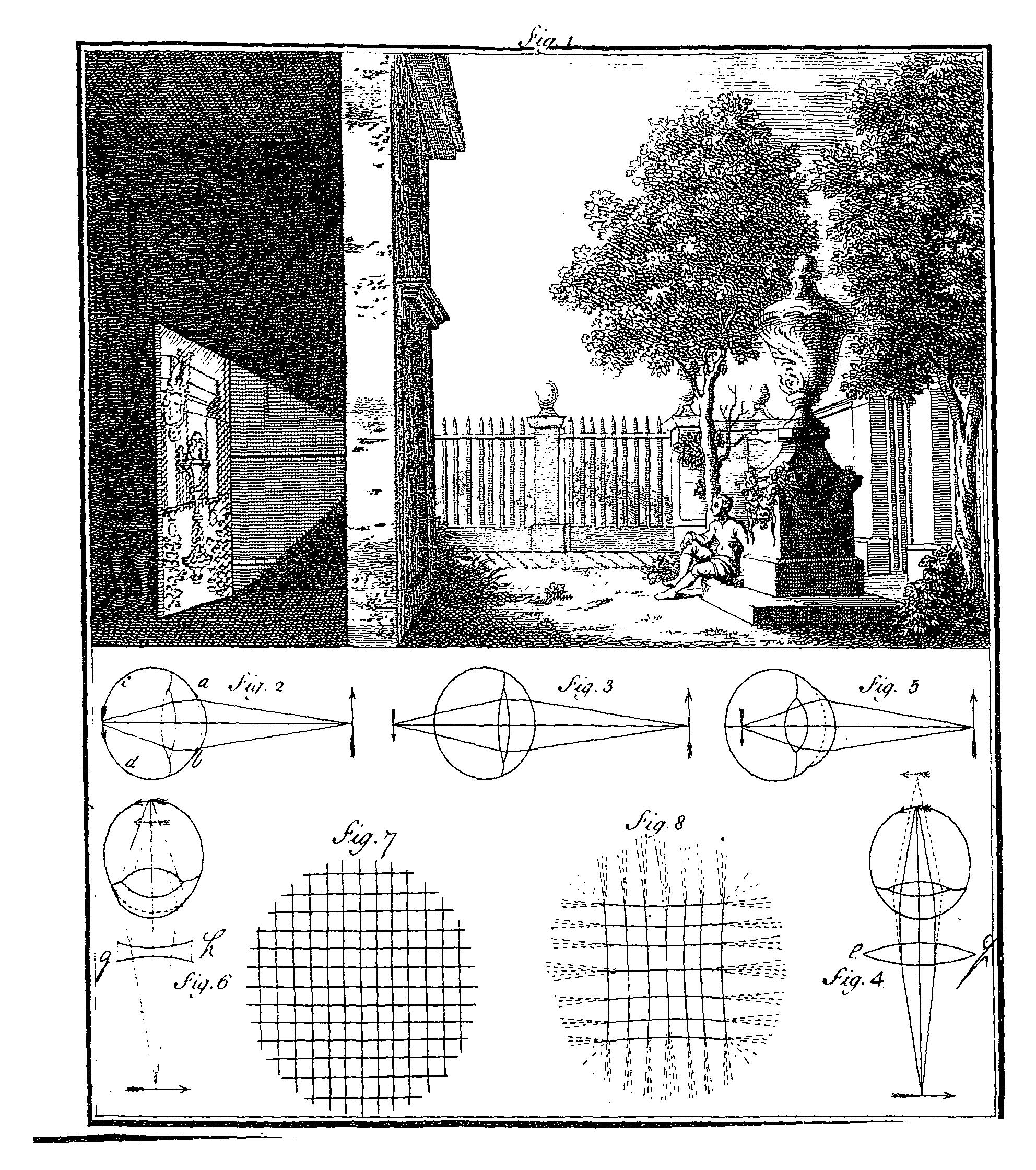
A page from "James Ayscough: A short account of the Eye and nature of vision"

James Ayscough /ˈæsˌkjuː/ (born 1720, died 1759) was an English optician and designer and maker of scientific instruments. He was apprenticed to an optician named James Mann from 1743 to 1747. James Ayscough became known for his microscopes. His shop was in London between 1740 and 1759. Around the year 1752, James Ayscough introduced spectacles with double-hinged side pieces. Although he made clear lenses, he recommended lenses tinted blue or green to treat some vision problems. These spectacles with tinted lenses are believed to be the precursors to sunglasses.

In February 1755 he began to contribute to the Gentleman's Magazine a daily register of the weather, month by month. It included barometric reading of pressure, and two temperature readings, in the early afternoon, and late in the evening. There was also a brief comment on the day's weather. He may have begun the record with instruments that the magazine already owned, (as it had been recording pressure and temperature sporadically since 1747, initially printed at the end of the monthly stock market report.) Initially barometric pressures were read to one-tenth of an inch, but that soon changed to 1/100, suggesting that he made his own instrument. His published register attracted the attention of George Smith near Carlisle, who began to contribute a matching record for Cumberland. This continued until Ayscough's death in 1759; his last entry in his record at London (Clerkenwell) was 23 August 1759.
