= Rigasa Railway Station =

Railway Station

Coordinates: 10.5487°N 7.3551°E

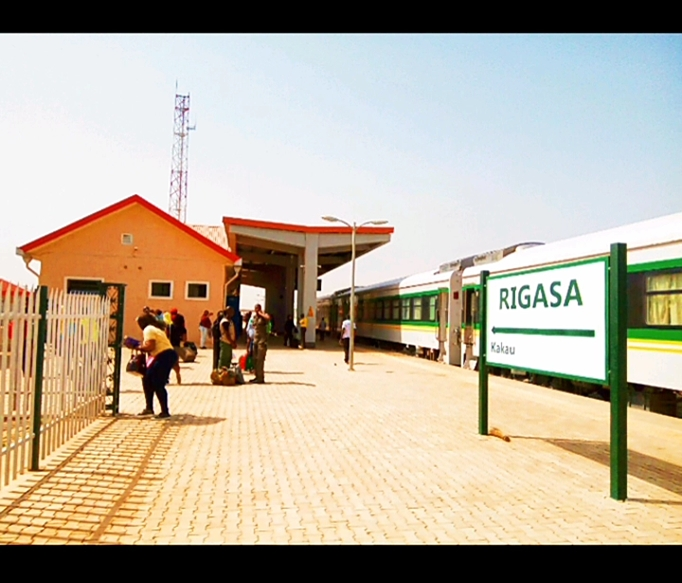

Rigasa Railway Station is a Railway Station located in Rigasa, Kaduna, Nigeria. The railway station was commissioned by the former president of Nigeria Muhammadu Buhari.

== Routes ==
Rigasa Railway Station has a railway leading to the federal capital of Nigeria, Abuja. On March 28, 2022, the train while departing from Rigasa Railway Station to Abuja was attacked by terrorists, kidnapping the hostages which caused a temporary closure.

== See also ==
- Rail transport in Nigeria
- Railway stations in Nigeria
- Lagos–Kano Standard Gauge Railway
