= Kaduna Golf Club =

Golf club in Kaduna Nigeria

- Location within Nigeria
- 10°31′23″N 7°26′25″E

Club information
- Location: Golf Course Road Ungwan Rimi Kaduna, Kaduna State, Nigeria
- Elevation: 65 feet (20 m)
- Established: 1921; 105 years ago
- Type: Public (Tournament Course) Private (Member Course)
- Tota holes: 18
- Greens: Poa trivialis / Bentgrass
- Fairways: Perennial Ryegrass
- Website: Kaduna Golf Club
- Par: 72
- Length: 7,422 yards (6,787 m)
- Course rating: 76.0
- Slope rating: 144

Kaduna Golf Club (since 1921) is a golf club located in Kaduna, Kaduna State Nigeria. The golf club is the first golf club in Northern Nigeria with a number of more than 750 members, it has a single golf course with a distance of 0.9 km and potting surface of 18 green holes which made it one of the largest golf club in Nigeria. The chairman Board of Trustees Kaduna Golf Club is His excellency the Emir of Birnin Gwari, Alhaji Zubairu Maigwari.
