= National Ear Care Centre =

Federal Specialty Hospital in Nigeria

Geography
- Location: Kaduna, Northern, Kaduna State, Nigeria

Organisation
- Type: Specialist

Services
- Emergency department: Available
- Beds: 50

History
- Founded: 1999

Links
- Website: necckaduna.com.ng
- Lists: Hospitals in Nigeria

National Ear Care Centre is a federal government of Nigeria speciality hospital located in Kaduna, Kaduna State, Nigeria.

== History ==
National Ear Care Centre was established in 1999.

== CMD ==
The current Chief Medical Director is Mustapha Abubakar-Yaro.

== Developments ==
In August 2024 the Minister of state of health, Tunji Alausa commissioned the new theatre complex, 200-seater capacity auditorium, ENT specialty clinic, amongst other facilities in the hospital.
