= Sam Oye =

Nigerian pastor

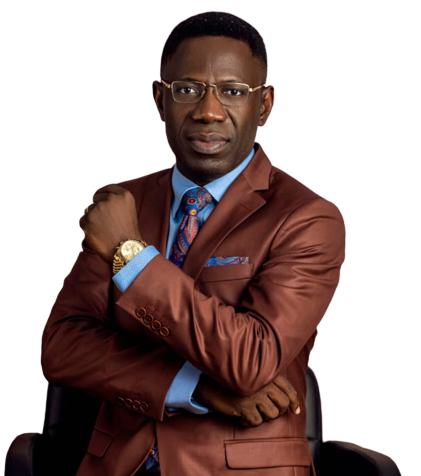
- Sam Oye in 2022

Personal life
- Born: Samuel Oluwasegun Oye; 13 April 1974 (age 52) Kaduna State, Nigeria
- Home town: Abeokuta, Ogun State
- Spouse: Mary Oye (m. 2002)
- Children: 2
- Parents: Simeon Adisa Shoroye (Late) (father); Florence Mopelola Shoroye (mother)
- Known for: Prophetic Prayer Hour (PPH)
- Occupation: Preacher; Leadership Development Coach; Certified Marriage Instructor; Author
- Website: www.samoye.org; www.pptribe.org

Religious life
- Religion: Christian
- Church: The Transforming Church, Worldwide (TTC)
- Founder of: Harvest House Mercy Foundation; Springtime Leadership Foundation
- Profession: Clergy

Senior posting
- Based in: Abuja

Sam Oye (born 13 April 1974) is a Nigerian pastor, life coach and author. He is the founder of Sam Oye Ministries and lead pastor of The Transforming Church Worldwide, and the host of the global Prophetic Prayer Hour, an online prayer meeting platform.

== Early life and education ==
Sam Oye was born on 13 April 1974 to Simeon Adisa and Florence Mopelola Shoroye, in Kaduna, Kaduna State. He hails from Abeokuta, Ogun State, Nigeria. Oye grew up in Bauchi State where he attended Government Day Secondary School, Bauchi, Bauchi State (1985-1988), Government Science Secondary School, Azare, Bauchi State (1989-1991) and Wasimi Community High School, Maryland, Lagos State. He further obtained a bachelor's degree in Geology from University of Ibadan, Oyo State.

Oye worked as a secretary with Bantale & Co Ltd, Lagos State, before becoming a full-time cleric.

== Ministry ==
In 1989, Oye served as the assistant leader of the Fellowship of Christian Students (FCS) in Azare, Bauchi State, and served as the assistant to the president of the Deeper Life School Outreach at Wasimi Community Secondary School in Maryland, Lagos, in 1994. He also held the position of District Student Leader for the Deeper Life Bible Church in Onigbongbo District, Lagos. He furthered his ministry as the Youth Pastor at Goodnews Miracle Bible Church in Alasia, Lagos, and later became the president of Dominion Youth Ministry (Dominion Team) in Lagos.

In 2000, Oye founded the Springtime Christian Center in Lagos and relocated to Abuja in 2002, where it evolved into The Transforming Church, Worldwide, (formerly Harvest House International Church). As of June 2024, The Transforming Church has 5 branches across Nigeria, and the United Kingdom.

At the wake of COVID-19, Oye started an online prayer session which grew to become the Prophetic Prayer Hour (PPH) hosted on YouTube and other social media platforms. The online prayer session has attracted thousands of followers from over hundreds countries daily.

Oye has hosted Prophetic Prayer conferences in Nigeria, the United Kingdom, Canada, the United States and other Trinidad and Tobago.

Oye has been featured as a Special guest on Christian Broadcasting Network (CBN), Trinity Broadcasting Network TBN Africa, TBN Salsa USA, TBN Praise the Lord Worldwide), DAYSTAR Television, and Channels TV.

== Personal life ==
Oye is married to Mary Oye and they have two children.

== Publications ==
- The Singles Checklist (10 Things You Must Check Before You Say I DO)
- The Emerging Leader
- The Prayer Switch
- The Limit Breaker
- Crack It
- The Outpouring
- Becoming a High-Impact Leader (21 Indispensable Principles for Increasing Your Impact and Influence in the 21st Century)

== Awards and honors ==
- Leadership Achievement Award from Dorben Polytechnic, Abuja.
- Honorary Fellowship Award from the Nigerian Christian Fellowship.
- Excellence and Merit Awards by the Christian Lawyers Fellowship of Nigeria.
- Honorary Citizen of Pensacola by Mayor of Pensacola, Florida - March 2010
- Honorary Doctorate - Doctor of Philosophy, Queen's University, Belfast - UK - November 2023
- National Christian Leadership Award, Abuja, Nigeria - July 28, 2025.
- Certified Global Expert in Leadership and Administrative Management By United World Congress Of Diplomats (UN WCD) In Conjunction With International Institute Of Experts On Political Economy And Administration (IIEPEA) - August 21, 2025
- Distinguished Fellow of the International Institute of Experts on Political Economy and Administration (IIEPEA)
