= Nigerian Optometric Association =

Eyecare Association

- Formation: 1968
- Headquarters: Abuja
- President: Dr Anderson Chimeziri.
- Website: https://noang.org/

The Nigerian Optometric Association (NOA) is an organization for optometrists in Nigeria with different chapters across the country. NOA promotes the welfare of optometrists and ensures proper eyecare awareness in Nigeria. The current President of NOA is Anderson Chimeziri.

== History of NOA ==
The Nigerian Optometric Association was established in 1968 in Lagos state. The headquarters is located at FCT Abuja. In 1972, the University of Benin established its first indigenous optometry training facility. In 1975, the Nigerian Optometric Association replaced the Nigerian Optical Association. The NOA's First Scientific Conference took place at the YMCA in Ikoyi, Lagos, in 1976. The association comprises 6000 doctors across the Nation. In March 2025, The Lagos chapter of NOA held the World Optometry Day.

== NOA conferences and events ==
The 45th yearly Conference of Nigerian Optometric Association Optometry was held in July 2022 for 5 days in Abuja, the capital of Nigeria.

The annual Conference was held in 2025 at ASSBIFI House, Alausa, Ikeja. Lagos state, Nigeria, featuring medical exhibits and a seminar/workshop. The conference was attended by more than five hundred professional optometrists, government officials, and other visitors from Lagos State.
