= National Eye Centre =

Federal Specialty Hospital in Nigeria

Geography
- Location: Kaduna, Kaduna State, Nigeria

Links
- Lists: Hospitals in Nigeria

National Eye Centre is a federal government of Nigeria speciality hospital located in Kaduna, Kaduna State, Nigeria. The current chief medical director is Amina Hassan Wali.

== History ==
National Eye Centre was established in December 1992.

== CMD ==
The current chief medical director is Amina Hassan Wali.
