= Polo in Nigeria =

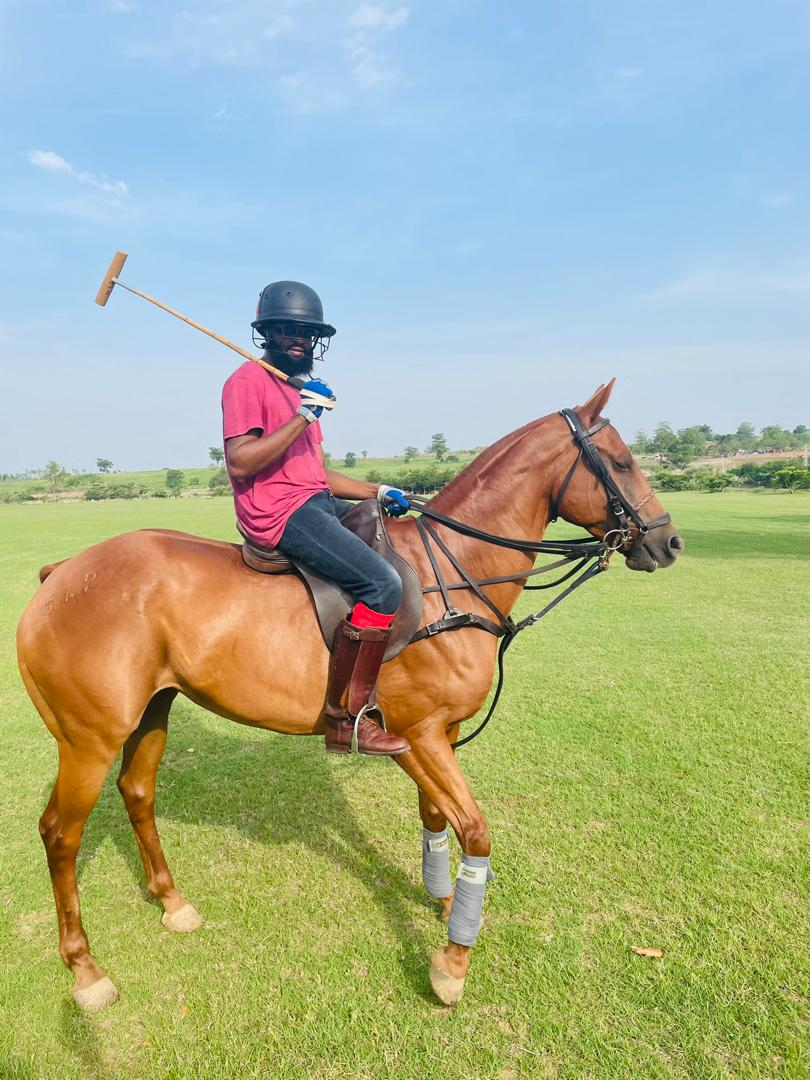
Nigerian businessman Khalil Halilu playing polo

Polo in Nigeria is a sport as old as the country itself, first played by European naval officers in the early years of the twentieth century. The game was introduced to Lagos in 1914 before spreading to Northern Nigeria. Today, the Nigerian Polo Federation is the sport's highest administrative body.

== History ==
The earliest games were played in Ikoyi on a strip of land between the Lagos Polo Club and Ikoyi Club. The first major competition was held in 1914, between German Kameroun and British Nigeria. Until 1960 its trophy was known as the Kaiser Wilhelm Cup (it had been donated by prominent German philanthropist Wilhelm Solf in the Kaiser's honor); after independence it became the Independence Cup. The comparatively low maintenance costs for horses in Nigeria (as opposed to Europe) and the monetary support of the West African Frontier Force made the sport very attractive to European expatriates. The West African Command had saddle clubs that advanced funds to officers to purchase ponies and stables where the ponies could be held. Most horses were Dongola breeds, Barbs or Asbens, a local crossbreed.

In Northern Nigeria, the sport of polo found favor with the Emir of Katsina, Muhammadu Dikko, whose visit to Hurlingham in the 1920s influenced his decision to develop the sport in Katsina. The influence of the Dikko and his team composed of four of his sons raised awareness of the game among Northern elites. Emir Nagogo, his son and successor became one of the country's most decorated players with a handicap of +7 while his team from Katsina was dominant in the game from the 1930s, when it earned a blue riband and won the Georgian Cup up until the 1950s.

After independence, when British civil servants and army officials went back to their home country, interest in polo was partly sustained by the military. A new military academy built in Kaduna in 1964 had polo exercises for his recruits. The Lagos Polo Club which was dominated by expatriates before independence relied on young businessmen and affluent Nigerians to sustain ground activities.

== Polo clubs ==
- Kaduna Polo Club
- Fifth Chukker Polo and Country Club

== Notable players ==
- Usman Nagogo
- Ahmadu Yakubu
- Idris Ibrahim
- Hassan Katsina
