= Hajiya Ma'daki =

Nigerian noblewoman

- Ma'daki of Katsina
- Taken in 1933
- Born: Salamatu Binin Abbas; 1907; Gidan Rumfa, Kano, Northern Nigeria Protectorate
- Died: circa 1990
- Spouse: Muhammadu Dikko (m. 1914; died 1944)
- Issue: none
- House: Dabo
- Father: Muhammadu Abbas

Salamatu Binin Abbas (born 1907), better known by her title Hajiya Ma'daki, was a Nigerian noblewoman and advisor in the royal courts of Katsina and Kano. The daughter of Emir Muhammad Abbas of Kano, she was married at a young age to Emir Muhammadu Dikko of Katsina. In Katsina, she became a trusted advisor and confidant to the Emir. She also served as an unofficial ambassador, regularly engaging with influential figures in Britain and colonial Nigeria, including Flora Shaw, Clementine Churchill, and Princess Elizabeth, often advocating for the advancement of girls' education in Northern Nigeria.

After the death of Emir Dikko in 1944, Ma'daki returned to the Kano palace, where her senior brother, Emir Abdullahi Bayero, regularly sought her counsel. She later accepted a colonial government request to serve as matron at a girls' secondary school in Kano. She continued to use her influence with both prominent Nigerians and Europeans to shape policy in Northern Nigeria. While her influence on Dikko's decisions is not formally documented like those of men, it is likely that her opinion, like those of other women of the period, was a more significant factor in the development of Northern Nigeria during the colonial period than has been acknowledged.

== Early life ==
Salamatu Binin Abbas was born in the Kano palace around 1907. Her parents were Emir of Kano Muhammadu Abbas and his concubine, Dela. Dela was the daughter of slaves captured during the reign of Abdullahi Maje Karofi (r. 1855–1883) and was raised in the palace. As a child, Salamatu attended Qur'anic classes, where she learned to read Arabic, though she later discontinued her studies, preferring to play instead.

Salamatu had an unusually close relationship with her father, Emir Abbas, in contrast to the prevailing Hausa-Fulani traditions of parental distance at the time. In 1914, at the age of seven, she was married to Muhammadu Dikko, who had recently been installed as Emir of Katsina by the British colonial officers. Unlike previous Katsina emirs, Dikko did not belong to the longstanding royal dynasty, and the marriage was seen as a political alliance between the emirates of Kano and Katsina. It was also a way for Dikko's new dynasty to gain some legitimacy through Kano's older, more respected Dabo dynasty. Her wedding was reportedly one of the most elaborate ceremonies held at the Kano palace.

Following her marriage, Salamatu relocated to the Katsina palace, where she continued her childhood among other children in the palace. She developed a particularly close bond with Usman Nagogo, a young prince two years her senior.

== Ma'daki of Katsina ==
Shortly after her arrival in Katsina, Salamatu was granted the title of Ma'daki, a designation reserved for the daughter of an emir who marries the Emir of Katsina. She became widely known by this title rather than her given name. An elaborate celebration was held to confer the royal title, during which she was presented with extravagant robes and a turban, symbolising her elevated status.

In 1921, Emir Muhammadu Dikko went on a pilgrimage to Mecca, becoming the first emir in Northern Nigeria to make the journey. He chose Ma'daki to accompany him, along with his son Usman Nagogo, his brother Kankiya Nuhu, Nuhu's wife, and several servants and concubines. Much of Ma'daki's travel was spent in seclusion within curtained ship cabins and enclosed carriages.

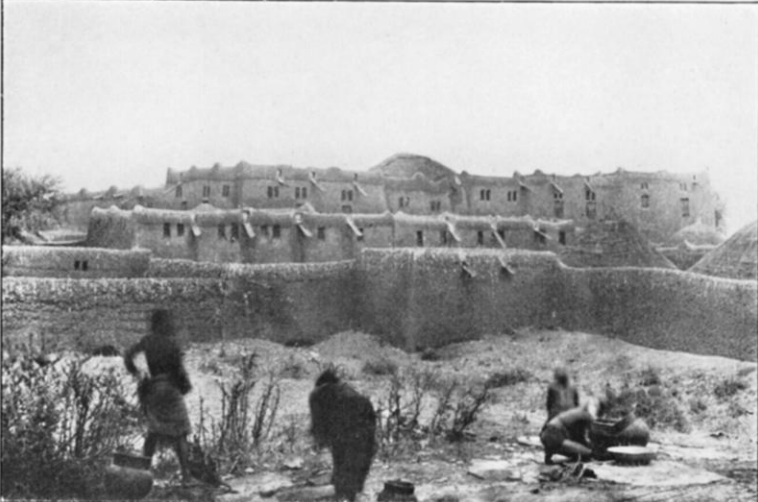
The Babban Soro wing of the Kano palace. The second story overlooks the central concubine ward of Yelwa, visible in the middleground. This photograph was taken in 1903, shortly after the British conquest of Kano.

Before proceeding to Mecca, the entourage first traveled to England, arriving in Liverpool on 27 June 1921. They toured several British cities before reaching London by car, guided by G.S. Browne, the lieutenant-governor of Northern Nigeria. Browne's wife personally escorted Ma'daki on shopping trips around the city. The group also attended a Russian ballet and visited the London Zoological Gardens. An attempt to take a walk in Regent's Park was abandoned due to the attention they attracted from the press and the public. During their stay, they were received by King George V at Buckingham Palace before continuing their journey to Mecca.

Although she never bore him children, Ma'daki increasingly grew closer to Dikko. She became his trusted confidante and adviser, valued for both her companionship and political insight. Dikko often sought her counsel and ensured she remained by his side, particularly during his travels.

=== Support for girls' education ===
As the colonial administration sought to expand its bureaucracy in Northern Nigeria, it recognised the need for Western-educated Nigerians from the region. This led to a gradual relaxation of the colonial government's initial restrictions on Western-style schooling. However, the proposal to establish such schools remained controversial among the region's emirs. While some emirs considered the matter irrelevant, since their sons were already receiving education in southern Nigeria, others opposed it on principle, viewing close collaboration with the British as undesirable.

Ma'daki shared the general skepticism of the Northern aristocracy and was initially hesitant about Emir Muhammadu Dikko's efforts to establish a school for girls in Katsina. Dikko, eager to uphold Katsina's reputation as the region's center of Islamic scholarship, saw value in accepting the British offer. Recognising Ma'daki's influence, he relied on her support to persuade the other emirs. If she endorsed the school, it could encourage rulers of smaller emirates to follow suit, particularly given the recent establishment of a girls' school in Kano.

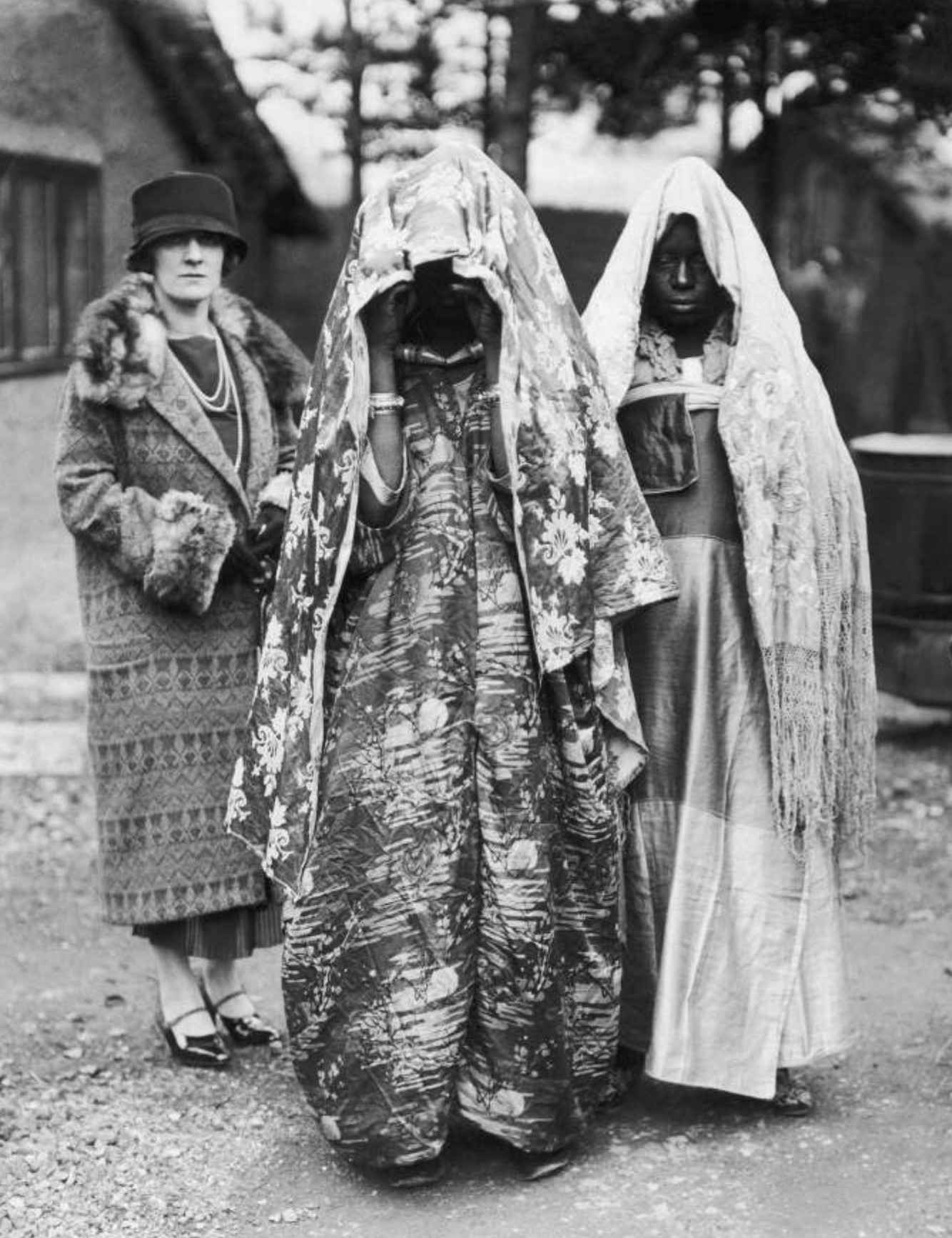
Hajiya Ma'daki and the senior wife of Emir Dikko, accompanied by their British guide, Mrs. G. S. Browne, during their tour of London in 1933.

The debate over the issue continued for several years. Successive colonial governors, including W. F. Gowers and G. S. Browne, were unable to secure the emirs' approval for Western education. However, a newly appointed district officer, one Mr. Patterson, and his wife eventually convinced Ma'daki of the benefits of a girls' school. Upon returning to the palace from a visit to their home, she informed Emir Dikko, "If you go to give advice to the other emirs tell them I said I agree. I have agreed for them to start a school." Thereafter Ma'daki became fully committed to promoting girls' education. She became deeply involved in establishing the school, overseeing the procurement of a British woman teacher for the girls, arranged accommodation for the teachers, and "did whatever she could to assure local leaders that this was indeed a safe and legitimate school for their daughters." She told her husband:

Someone should connect the pump to the river...And you should remove your concubines. Put four people in the kitchen. Put two people to work as police, and give them hats and the uniforms of policemen—and whips. If you don't do that, the children will not fear them. And select four people to give to me to teach them how to teach the children. And with that, we shall have a school.

In January 1932, British writer Margery Perham visited the girls' school within the Katsina palace. She described the experience:

...Here was a Froebel teacher, Miss Robinson, half submerged by waves of little girls. The Emir has provided them with a uniform, which they had put on in my honor, homespun cream tunics with pink collars and gay little turbans of white silk striped with pink and yellow. They looked free and happy, crawling about or squatting as they sewed little mats with coloured threads or played with instructive kindergarten toys. Some of the Emir's wives were helping with them, notably Maidaki [sic], the Emir's chief and favourite wife, sister of the Emir of Kano (i.e. a very good match)...She is an extremely fine-looking woman, with grave, courteous, yet independent manners.

Perham also observed Emir Dikko's engagement with the school:

The Emir was hanging around me all the time so I had little time to talk to the teacher...I took a group of him with Miss Robinson, Maidaki and the children, and it was rather charming to see him helping to marshal the tots and their evident confidence in him. I certainly was given a new and happier picture of a Nigerian royal harem than I had expected to find.

With her growing interest in education, Ma'daki took the opportunity during her later visits to Britain to tour several girls' schools. In a 1933 trip to England, she requested "to be shown those institutions which cater to the needs of children." During the trip, she visited a Montessori Kindergarten, a Children's Hospital, and Roedean School."

== Later life ==
When her husband Emir of Katsina Muhammadu Dikko died in 1944, Ma'daki returned to the Kano palace, where her senior brother, Abdullahi Bayero, reigned. Emir Bayero reportedly sought her counsel regularly, valuing her insights as a well-traveled woman with experience in both Katsina's political affairs and international diplomacy.

Later, Ma'daki left the palace to accept a position as a matron at a girls' secondary school in Kano, following a request from the colonial government. Provided with a residence on the school grounds, she took an active role in student life, overseeing daily routines, cleanliness, and discipline. She ensured students followed structured schedules, including prayers, inspections, and mealtimes, while also instructing them in proper etiquette.

Despite her new position as a secondary school matron, Ma'daki continued her role as an unofficial diplomat. She frequently engaged with prominent Nigerian and European figures, including Baroness Clementine Churchill, the wife of Winston Churchill. Her conversations with European dignitaries informed the advice she provided to Emir Bayero, which he reportedly valued.
