= Yakubu =

- Gender: Male
- Language: Hausa/Yoruba

Origin
- Origin: Nigerian
- Meaning: God is merciful.
- Region of origin: North-East, North-West and South West, Nigeria

listen

Yakubu is a male-given Hausa, Yoruba and some parts of Edo. The name is commonly used as a surname in Nigeria and other African countries. The name means "God is merciful.". It is a cognate of Jacob or Yakub from both the Bible and Quran scriptures.

== Notable individuals with the name ==
Given name

- Yakubu (born 1982 as Yakubu Ayegbeni), Nigerian footballer
- Yakubu (Gobir ruler), historical ruler of the Hausa city-state of Gobir
- Yakubu II, most recent ruler of the Kingdom of Dagbon
- Yakubu Abubakar Akilu (born 1989), Nigerian footballer
- Yakubu Adamu (born 1981), Nigerian footballer
- Yakubu Adesokan (born 1979), Nigerian powerlifter
- Yakubu Alfa (born 1990), Nigerian footballer
- Yakubu Bako, Nigerian governor
- Yakubu Dogara (born 1967), Speaker of the Nigerian House of Representatives
- Yakubu Gowon (born 1934), Head of state of Nigeria
- Yakubu Itua (1941–2006), Nigerian jurist
- Yakubu Tali, Ghanaian politician

Surname

- Abubakari Yakubu (born 1981), Ghanaian footballer
- Ahmadu Yakubu, Nigerian-born polo player
- Andrew Yakubu (born 1955), Group Managing Director of the Nigerian National Petroleum Corporation
- Balaraba Ramat Yakubu (born 1959), Nigerian author
- Bawa Andani Yakubu, traditional ruler of Gushegu and former Inspector General of Police of the Ghana Police Service
- Garba Yakubu Lado, Nigerian businessman
- Hawa Yakubu (1948–2007), Ghanaian politician
- Ismail Yakubu (born 1985), English footballer
- John Yakubu, Nigerian politician
- Imoro Yakubu Kakpagu (born 1958), Ghanaian politician
- Haruna Yakubu (born 1955), Ghanaian academic
- Mahmood Yakubu, Nigerian academic
- Malik Yakubu, Deputy Speaker of the Ghanaian parliament
- Malik Al-Hassan Yakubu, member of the Pan-African Parliament from Ghana
- Shaibu Yakubu (born 1986), Ghanaian footballer
- Yusif Yakubu (born 1976), Ghanaian footballer

== Places ==
- Yakubu Gowon Airport
- Yakubu Gowon Stadium
