= Othman Ladan Baki =

Nigerian politician

Othman Ladan Baki (1926 - 25 June 2008) was a retired Nigerian government official. He is the son of Kankia Muhammad Sada Nadada, and the grandson of Sarkin Katsina Muhammadu Dikko. He was the supervisor of Works Survey and Rural Water Supply in Katsina Local Government Area in 1960. Ladan was a member of the Northern House of Assembly from 1952 to 1956 and was re-elected in 1956. He was a parliamentary secretary at the Ministry of Trade and Industry from 1955 to 1956 and then Minister of Trade, Northern Nigeria in 1965, and later Provincial Commissioner for Zaria Province from 1962 to 1965. In 1982 Dr. Othman Ladan-Baki, OFR, was appointed as the chairman, National Assembly Service Commission.

== Early life ==
Ladan was born in 1927, in Katsina Town of old Kaduna State, to the family of Kankia Muhammad Sada Nadada. He was educated at Katsina Elementary School, Katsina Middle School, Kaduna College and Civil Engineering School, Kaduna and later attended Civil Engineering Course in Britain from 1959 to 1960.

== Career ==
Ladan is an experienced civil engineer and politician. He was the Supervisor of Works in Katsina Local Government Area in 1956 and later the Councillor of Works, Survey and Rural Water Supply of the same area in 1960 before becoming the Provincial Commissioner for Zaria Province from 1962 to 1965. Ladan was a member of the Northern House of Assembly from 1952 to 1956 and was re-elected in 1956. He was a parliamentary secretary at the Ministry of Trade and Industry from 1955 to 1956 and then Minister of Trade, Northern Nigeria in 1965, and later Provincial Commissioner for Zaria Province from 1962 to 1965. In 1982 Dr. Othman Ladan-Baki, OFR, was appointed as the chairman, National Assembly Service Commission. He held positions such as: chairman, Emergency Relief Agency, Katsina State in November 1987; chairman, Nigerian Pilgrims Commission in 1989. In 1991, he was appointed member Emirate Council. He was Governor, National Judicial Institute; In August 1998 he was appointed as a Commissioner in the Independent National Electoral Commission (INEC).

== Recognition ==
Baki was awarded the OFR by the Federal Government of Nigeria in 1964 in recognition of his Commitment to meritorious service to the country. Later in 1976, ABU Zaria conferred on him the Honorary Doctorate of Law Degree (LLB).

Othman Ladan Baki died on 25 June 2008 in an automobile accident.
