= Murtala =

Murtala is a given name. Notable people with the name include:

- Murtala Muhammed (1938–1976), Nigerian general and 4th Head of State of Nigeria
- Ibrahim Murtala Muhammed (1974-2025), Ghanaian politician
- Murtala Nyako (born 1942), Nigerian politician and military administrator

== See also ==
- Murtala Muhammed International Airport
- Murtala Square
