= Muhammadu Kabir Usman =

Nigerian monarch

Emir of Katsina
- Tenure: 18 March 1981 – 8 March 2008
- Coronation: 18 March 1981
- Predecessor: Usman Nagogo
- Successor: Abdulmumini Kabir Usman
- Born: January 1928
- Died: 8 March 2008 (aged 80)
Names
- Muhammadu Kabir Usman
- Dynasty: Sullubawa, Fulani
- Father: Usman Nagogo
- Mother: Ummulkhair
- Religion: Sunni Islam

Alhaji Dr. Muhammadu Kabir Usman (January 1928 – 8 March 2008) was the 49th Emir of Katsina from 18 March 1981, until his death in March 2008. He was the tenth Fulani emir, as well as the third emir from the Sullubawa dynasty. He succeeded his father Usman Nagogo, and was succeeded by his son, the current emir Abdulmumini Kabir Usman.

== Early life and education ==
Kabir was born in January 1928 to the then emir's son Usman Nagogo and his wife Ummulkhair. He was named by Sherif Gudid, an Arab cleric, who was a friend of Nagogo. At an early age, Kabir was enrolled into a Qur'anic school situated within the palace, which was then headed by an Arab scholar, Mohammed Abdullahi, believed to have been hired purposely for that by his grandfather, Emir Muhammadu Dikko. A little later, Kabir moved to further his Quranic studies at Tsamiya, a place in Katsina near the palace. In 1942, at the age of 14, Kabir was admitted into the Katsina Middle School, with 52 others, from across the then Katsina Province. On completion in 1947, he joined the Katsina Native Authority Police and was sent to the Nigeria Police College, Kaduna for a one-year training.

== Career and Politics ==
Kabir was promoted to Lance Corporal and appointed Wakilin Doka, the Katsina native authority Police chief in 1951 by his father, who had become emir in 1944. In 1953, Kabir went to Lagos for a Criminal Investigation course, and later went to the Police College, London for a similar course. In 1957, he was made the native authority councilor in charge of police, prison and the department of urban water supply. Kabir worked effectively as Police chief, handling one of the delicate police work that arose as a result of a Northern elements progressive union (NEPU) inspired revolt of Sambon Barka in the southern part of the Katsina emirate. He was also made acting Magajin Gari in 1957. He served as a member of the boards of many schools and the Gaskiya Corporation, based in Zaria.

In 1963, Kabir was confirmed as Magajin Gari, the district head of Katsina metropolis, a title held previously by his father when his grandfather was emir. The same year, Kabir was elected as a member of the House of Assembly, Kaduna. He became a parliamentary secretary in the premier Ahmadu Bello's office in Kaduna in 1965. After the Military coup in 1966, Kabir returned to Katsina and continued to serve as Magajin Gari.

Being the Magajin Gari made Kabir very close to his father, he accompanied Nagogo to national conferences and meetings, and sometimes representing him in functions. Kabir also accompanied his father on international visits.

== Succession as Emir ==
On 18 March 1981, Usman Nagogo died, and the Katsina king-makers chose Kabir to succeed him, being close to his father as magajin Gari, and being his second eldest son (the eldest, Ibrahim Ladan-fari having predeceased Nagogo). The then Governor of Kaduna State, which Katsina was part of then, Abdulkadir Balarabe Musa, refused to approve the choice. This led to a deadlock that lasted until the Governor was impeached by the State house of assembly in June 1981. Balarabe Musa's successor, Abba Musa Rimi, later approved and Kabir was Turbaned at Katsina's Kangiwa square. His official installation was done on 20 February 1982 at Katsina Polo Ground.

== Reign ==
Kabir's reign was characterized by his down to earth nature. Kabir was well educated and knew the Qur'an well, he was therefore considered both as an emir and an Islamic scholar, and was known to have written whole copies of the Qur'an with his hand. Kabir was known by the epithet "Limamin Sarakuna dan Shehu" (The imam of emirs, the son of Shehu). Kabir also created new districts in the emirate during his reign.

One of the highlights of Kabir's reign was the creation of Katsina State, comprising Katsina and Daura emirates, out of the then Kaduna State. Kabir also demolished the famous Masallacin Dutsi, which was built by his grandfather Muhammadu Dikko in 1935, and constructed the Katsina central mosque which is still in use today.

Like his father and grandfather, Kabir was a Polo enthusiast, having started playing when he was a teenager, and playing well into his sixties. He became the life President of the Nigerian Polo association, and the Emir of Katsina charity shield tournament was held in his honor.

Kabir preached peace and tolerance, and always preached to his subjects to live in peace, he also always tried to remind them of life after death, and God's final judgement. He also received honorary doctorate degrees from the University of Benin, and the Obafemi Awolowo University, Ile-ife, where he served as Chancellor.

== Death and succession ==
As he advanced in age, Kabir became frequently ill, and was often flown out of Nigeria for medical check-ups and treatments. His illness rendered him unable to perform the customary traditional Durbar on the two Eid festivals of 2007. Kabir's illness intensified and he died on 8 March 2008 at the age of eighty, he was survived by 3 wives and many children. Kabir was succeeded that same month by his eldest son, Abdulmumin who had served as Magajin Gari.
