= 1966 anti-Igbo pogrom =

1966 massacres of Igbo people in Nigeria

1966 Anti-Igbo Pogrom
- Location: 10.533°N 7.485°E; Northern Region, Nigeria
- Date: 1966
- Target: Igbos and other easterners
- Attack type: Pogrom
- Deaths: 8,000–30,000 The estimated number of deaths ranged as high as 30,000, although the figure was probably closer to 8,000 to 10,000
- Injuries: unspecified number
- Perpetrators: Hausa people; Fulani people; Nigerian Army under Hassan Katsina and Murtala Mohammed
- Motive: Revenge for the 1966 Nigerian coup d'état; Anti-Igbo sentiment; Christophobia; Ethnic cleansing

The 1966 anti-Igbo pogroms were a series of widespread massacres and pogroms committed against Igbo people–and other people of southern Nigerian origin–living in northern Nigeria, starting in May 1966 and reaching its peak after 29 September 1966. Between 8,000 and 30,000 Igbos and easterners have been estimated to have been killed. A further 1 million Igbos fled the Northern Region into the East. In response to the killings, some northerners were massacred in Port Harcourt and other cities in eastern Nigeria. These events led to the secession of the eastern Nigerian region and the declaration of Biafra, which ultimately led to the Nigerian Civil War.

== Background ==
The events took place in the context of military coups d'etat and in the prelude to the Nigerian Civil War. The immediate precursor to the massacres was the January 1966 Nigerian coup d'etat. Most of the politicians and senior army officers killed in the coup d'etat were northerners because Northerners were the majority in Nigeria's government, including Prime Minister Abubakar Tafawa Balewa and Ahmadu Bello the Sardauna of Sokoto. The coup was opposed by other senior army officers. An Igbo officer, Aguiyi-Ironsi stopped the coup in Lagos while another Igbo officer, Emeka Ojukwu stopped the coup in the north. Aguiyi-Ironsi then assumed power, forcing the civilian government to cede authority. He established a military government led by himself as supreme commander. In the months following the coup, it was widely noted that four of the five army majors who executed the coup were Igbo and that the general in charge was also Igbo. Northerners feared that the Igbo had set out to take control of the country. In a response action Northern officers carried out the July 1966 Nigerian counter-coup in which 240 Southern members of the army were systematically killed, three-quarters of them Igbo, as well as thousands of civilians of southern origin living in the north. In the aftermath, Yakubu Gowon, a Northern Christian, assumed command of the military government. In this background, increased ethnic rivalries led to further massacres.

The massacres were widely spread in the north and peaked on 29 May, 29 July, and 29 September 1966. By the time the pogrom ended, virtually all Igbos of the North were dead, hiding among sympathetic Northerners or on their way to the Eastern region. The massacres were led by the Nigerian Army and replicated in various Northern Nigerian cities. Although Colonel Gowon was issuing guarantees of safety to Southern Nigerians living in the North, the intention of a large portion of the Nigerian army at the time was genocidal as was the common racist rhetoric among Hausa tribes. With the exception of a few Northern Nigerians (mainly army officers who were not convinced that Igbo were innately evil), the Southern and Eastern Nigerians were generally regarded at the time in the North of Nigeria as described by Charles Keil:

The Igbo and their ilk...vermin and snakes to trod underfoot...dogs to be killed.

Ethnic rivalries in the marketplace might have also influenced the pogrom, especially after the first coup. Professor Murray Last, a scholar and historian living in the city of Zaria at the time, recounts his experience:

And the day after the coup – January 16th 1966 – there was initially so much open relief on the ABU campus that it shocked me. It was only later, when I was living within Zaria city (at Babban Dodo), that I encountered the anger at the way Igbo traders (and journalists) were mocking their Hausa fellow traders in Zaria’s Sabon Gari over the death of their ‘father’, and were pushing aside various motorpark workers elsewhere, telling the Hausa that the rules had now all changed and it was the Hausa who were now the underlings in market or motorpark. Hearing the Hausa men tell among themselves each evening of the insults they had heard from Igbos that day showed me vividly how the initial relief at the coup had transformed into fury. It worried me little at the time (living safely in the centre of Zaria city) but I was naive enough not to expect serious violence. That I only witnessed later when for example, in April 1966, I was in Jalingo: there, one Sunday afternoon, I was formally warned killing was to happen. I was told I must leave town before nightfall.

Northern Nigerians were however also targeted in the Igbo dominated Eastern Nigeria. Thousands of Hausas, Tiv and other Northern Tribes were massacred by Igbo mobs, forcing a mass exodus of Northerners from the Eastern Region.

Non-Igbo Eastern minorities and Midwesterners in the North were also attacked as there were no ways to differentiate them from Igbos by appearance, who were all collectively known by the name "Yameri" in the North.

One factor that led to the hostility toward Southern Nigerians in general and Igbo in particular was the attempt by the Aguiyi Ironsi regime to abolish regionalisation in favor of a unitary system of government which was regarded as a plot to establish Igbo domination in the Federation. On 24 May 1966 Ironsi issued a unitary decree, which led to an explosion of attacks against the Igbo in Northern Nigeria on 29 May 1966. The British press was unanimous in its conviction at the time that these 29 May killings were organized and not spontaneous. The Ironsi regime was also perceived to have been favoring Southern Nigerians in the appointment to key positions in government, thus heightening the inter-ethnic rivalries.

The failure of the Ironsi regime to punish the army mutineers responsible for the January 1966 coup further exacerbated the situation. The May 1966 pogrom was carried out by rampaging mobs with the connivance of local government. The unprofessional attitude of some elements of the international press are also known to have added to the existing tension. J.D.F. Jones, the diplomatic correspondent of the Financial Times had on 17 January 1966 already predicted that the Northerners might "already have begun to take revenge for the death of their leader the Sardauna of Sokoto on the large number of Igbo who live in the North", which at the time they were not doing. This has been criticized as an irresponsible and for a journalist unprofessional, self-fulfilling prophecy which would lead the Northern elite to assume that the Financial Times was in possession of information that they were not aware of, and that the world expected the North to react in this way. Later tactics were engineered by Northern elites to provoke violence such as fabricated news stories submitted to radio Cotonou and relayed by the Hausa service of the BBC detailing exaggerated attacks against Northerners in the East, which led to the furious killings of Eastern Nigerians on 29 September 1966.

According to British newspaper reports at the time, about 30,000 Igbo were killed in September 1966, while more conservative estimates put the casualties at a floor of 10,000 with as many as 30,000 for the month of September alone. This spree of killings carried on into early October and was carried out by civilians sometimes aided by army troops and swept the entire north. It has been described as the most painful and provocative incident leading to the Nigeria-Biafra War.

== Aftermath ==
The pogroms led to the mass movement of Igbo and other Eastern Nigerians back to Eastern Nigeria (it is estimated that more than one million Igbos returned to the eastern region). It also was the precursor to Ojukwu's declaration of Eastern Nigeria's secession from the federation as the Republic of Biafra, and the resulting Nigerian Civil War (1967–1970)

== See also ==
- Biafra
- Anti-Igbo sentiment
- Igbo culture
- Igbo people
- Sabon Gari
- Asaba massacre

== Bibliography ==
- Agbiboa, D. (2013). Ethno-religious Conflicts and the Elusive Quest for National Identity in Nigeria. Journal of Black Studies, 44(1), pp. 3–30.
- Anthony, D. (2014). ‘Ours is a war of survival’: Biafra, Nigeria and arguments about genocide, 1966–70. Journal of Genocide Research, 16(2–3), pp. 205–225
- Aro, G. & Ani, K. (2017). A Historical Review of Igbo Nationalism in the Nigerian Political Space. Journal of African Union Studies, 6(2/3), pp. 47–77.
- Omenka, N. (2010). Blaming The Gods: Christian Religious Propaganda In The Nigeria—Biafra War. The Journal of African History, 51(3), pp. 367–389.
