= Joseph Akahan =

Chief of Army Staff of Nigeria (1937–1968)

Colonel Joseph Akahan

Chief of Army Staff
- In office August 1966 – May 1968
- Preceded by: Yakubu Gowon
- Succeeded by: Hassan Katsina

Personal details
- Born: 12 April 1937 Gboko LGA, British Nigeria
- Died: May 1968 (aged 31)

Military service
- Allegiance: Nigeria
- Branch/service: Nigerian Army
- Rank: Colonel
- Battles/wars: Congo Crisis; Nigerian Civil War

Joseph Akahan (12 April 1937 – May 1968) born Joseph Akaahan Agbo, was a Nigerian military officer and Chief of Army Staff from May 1967 until May 1968, when he was killed in a helicopter crash during the Nigerian Civil War.

== Birth and education ==
Akahan was born on 12 April 1937 in Gboko Local Government Area of Benue State. He attended Government College Keffi where he obtained his Cambridge School Certificate (1952–1956). He trained as an officer cadet at the RWAFF Training School Teshi, Ghana (1957–1958) and the Royal Military Academy Sandhurst, United Kingdom (1958–1960). He was commissed on 23 July 1960.

== Military career ==
Akahan served with the Nigerian Contingent during the United Nations Peacekeeping Operations in Congo. In the January 1966 coup that brought Major General Johnson Aguiyi-Ironsi to power, the mainly northern Ibadan-based 4th battalion lost its commanding officer who was replaced by an Igbo, Major Nzefili. The northern officers refused to obey him, and Aguiyi-Ironsi was forced to replace him with Major Joe Akahan, a northern Tiv officer. Akahan was one of the leaders of the Nigerian counter-coup of 1966 in which Aguiyi-Ironsi was killed and replaced General Yakubu Gowon, and in which there was a mass slaughter of Igbo officers at 4th Battalion in Ibadan under Akahan's command. Following the coup he said there would be no more killing by Northern soldiers "since events had now balanced out".

Akahan was appointed Chief of Army Staff in May 1967 shortly before the outbreak of the Nigerian Civil War. He was said to be the brain behind the concept of the sea-borne operations led by Lt. Colonel Benjamin Adekunle that captured Bonny in July 1967. When he died in a helicopter crash in May 1968, he was replaced as COAS by General Hassan Katsina. Joe Akahan Barracks is named after him, located in Makurdi, capital of his home state (Benue) and an early base of operations during the civil war.
