= Ahmadu Yakubu =

Nigerian polo player

Personal information
- Full name: Ahamadu Yakubu
- Nationality: Nigerian
- Citizenship: Nigeria
- Born: late 1940s or mid-1950s
- Died: 1997
- Occupation: Polo player

Ahamadu Yakubu (1942–1997) was a Nigerian Army officer and lieutenant colonel, polo player, and businessman from Northern Nigeria. He was associated with the development of polo in Northern Nigeria and participated in domestic and international polo competitions during the 1970s and 1980s. Outside his sports career, he was involved in business and industrial ventures in Nigeria.

== Early life ==
Yakubu was born between the late 1940s to mid-1950s in Batchama to Kaka Yakubu. At the age of four, he was working in the fields scaring away birds from the crops with a slingshot. At 11, he left home and worked from numerous Alhaji in and around Kaduna, particularly in stables.

== Career ==
During the 1970s, Yakubu established a construction and development company called Songhai Pty Ltd based in Kaduna. During the 1970s and 1980s, Songhai Pty Ltd constructed major projects through Northern Nigeria for major commercial, industrial and Government clients such as UNTL, Zamfara (Textiles), Peugeot Automobile Nigeria, Borno, Plateau, Kano, and Kaduna State Governments. During this period, he was Captain of the Kaduna Polo Club, transforming it into a northern hub for the game and the venue for regional and international polo tournaments.

After beating King Charles III in a game, Yakubu was described as the world's "best black back" in reference to his position in polo.

== Personal life and death ==
Yakubu was diagnosed with prostate cancer and died in 1997.

== Legacy ==
The Kaduna Polo Club was renamed the "Ahmadu Yakubu Polo Ground" after his death, and now renamed as the "HRH Kabir Usman Polo Ground" to honor the then-Emir of Katsina state Alhaji Abdulmumini Kabir Usman.
