= Murtala Square =

Public centre

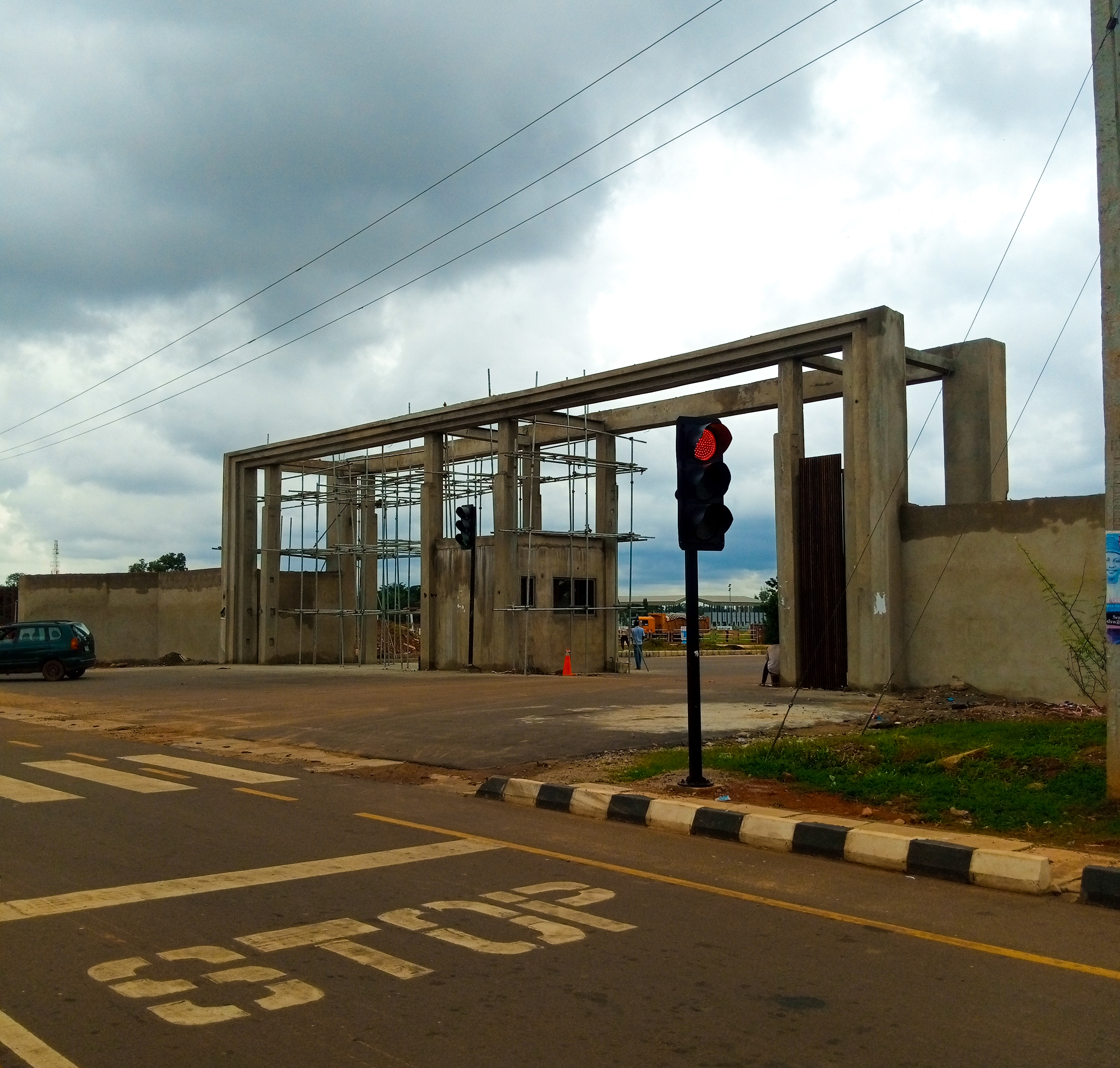
- New gate of Murtala Square under construction in August 2021

- Location within Nigeria
- Former name: Kaduna Race Course
- Namesake: Murtala Ramat Muhammed
- Maintained by: Kaduna State
- Location: Kaduna, Kaduna State, Nigeria
- North: Race Course Road
- East: Race Course Road
- South: Muhammadu Buhari Way (Waff Road)
- West: Independence Way

Construction
- Completed: c. 1950

Murtala Muhammed Square is a public square in the City of Kaduna, Nigeria, formerly known as the Kaduna Race Course.

It was renamed for the former military Head of State Murtala Ramat Muhammed.

Murtala Square is located in the city centre. The town square has historical monuments and activities that showcase Kaduna life.

The square includes recreational and sporting facilities such as gymnasiums, an indoor sports hall, football fields, and a hockey pitch.

== Sports ==
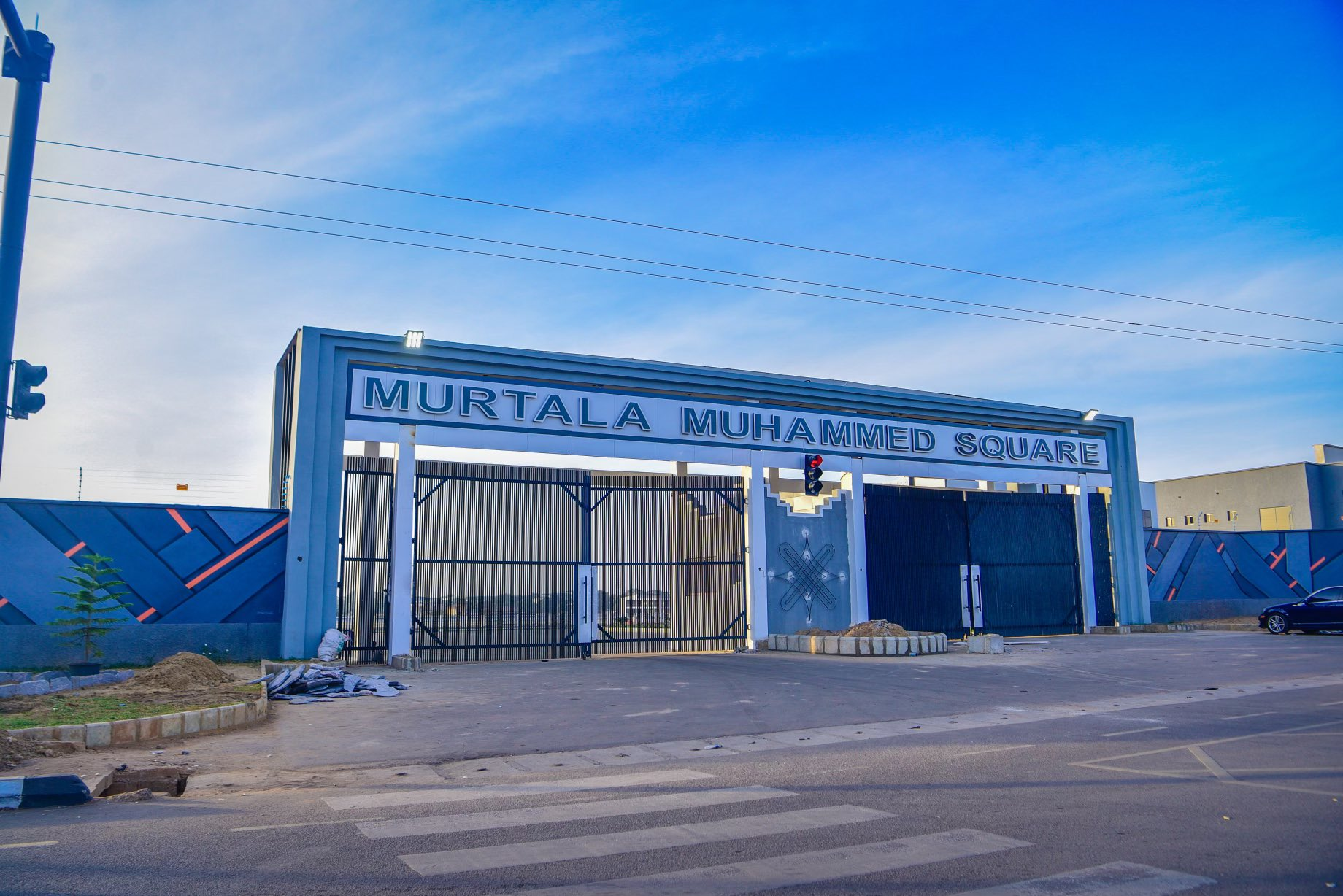
Main entrance Gate of Murtala Square (After renovation)

The Square is home to several sports-related institutions. These include two Kaduna Polo Club polo grounds, the Kaduna State Ministry of Youth, Sport and Culture, and Umaru Musa Yaradua Indoor Sport Hall. There's also different grounds for other sports activities like Beach Soccer, Basketball, Badminton and a well equipped GYM.

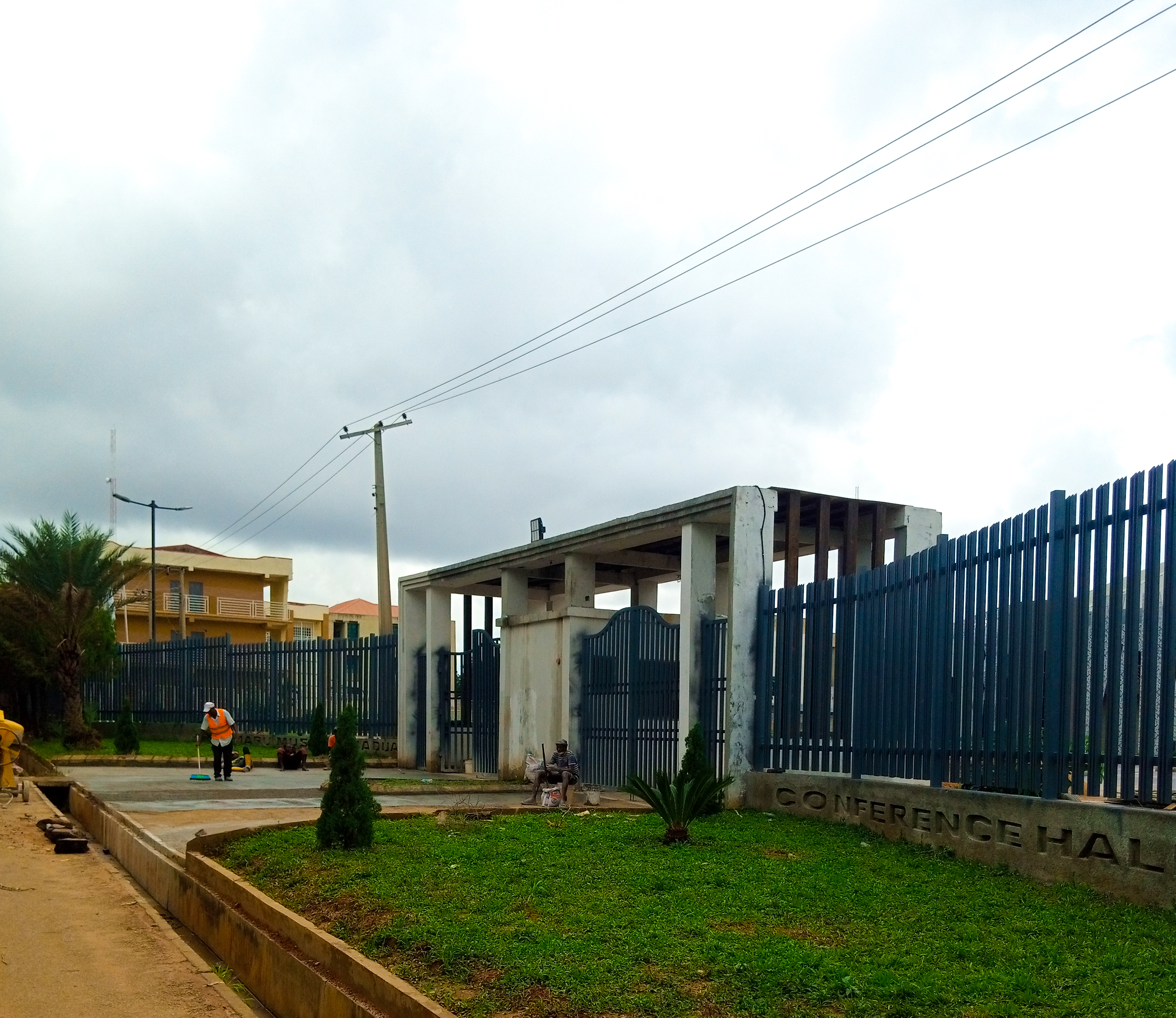
accessible via the other gate from West side

International, national and local celebrations have since taken place in the Square, including recurring events like Kaduna Grand Durbar, Kaduna Centenary Celebrations, Nigeria's Independence Day, May Day, Inauguration Ceremony of Governors, Army Day, and Human Rights Day.

== See also ==
- Kaduna Polo Club
- Ranchers Bees Stadium
- Ahmadu Bello Stadium

== Gallery ==
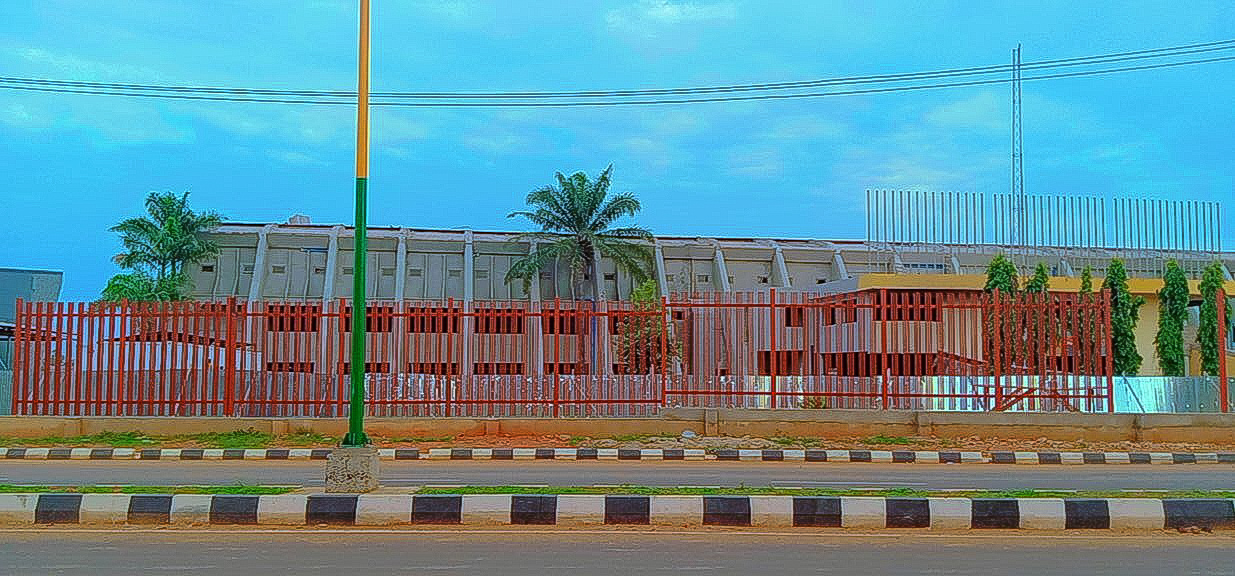
View of Murtala Square from Race Course Road

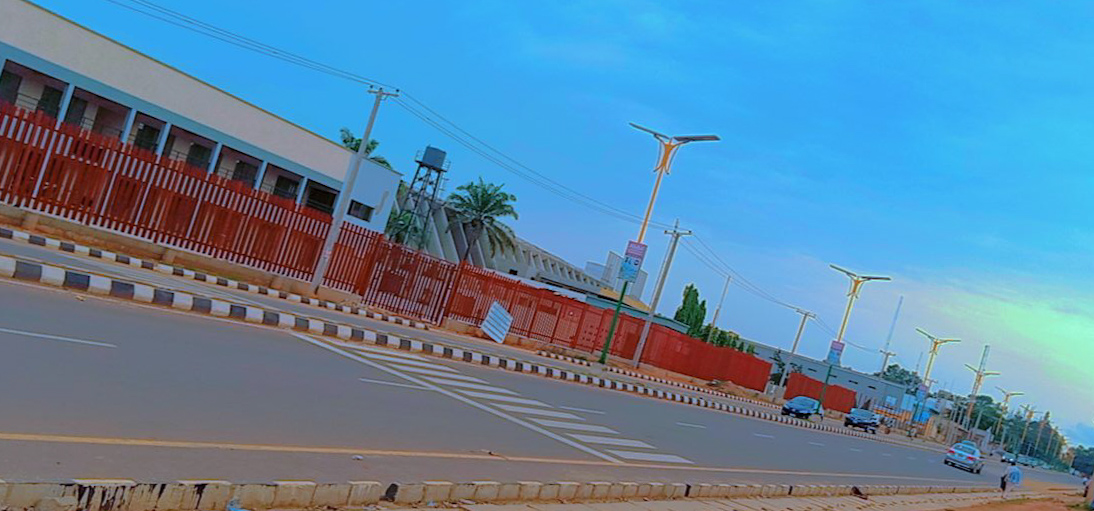
Race Course Road

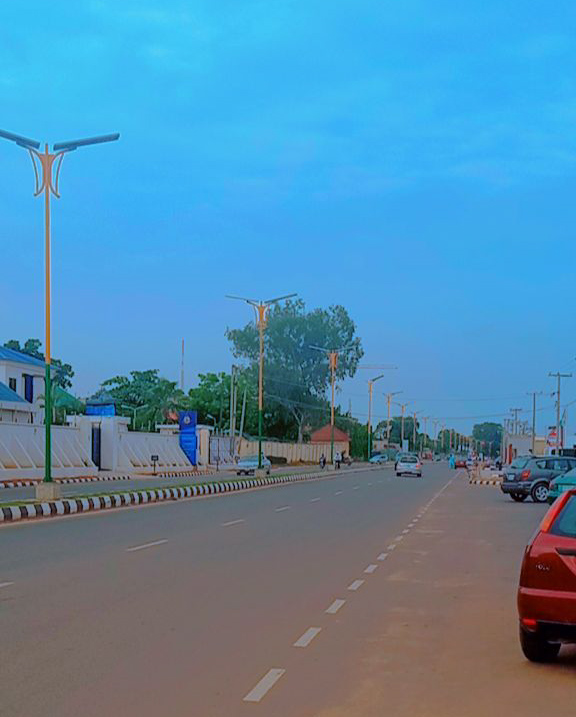
from West to Murtala Square Gate

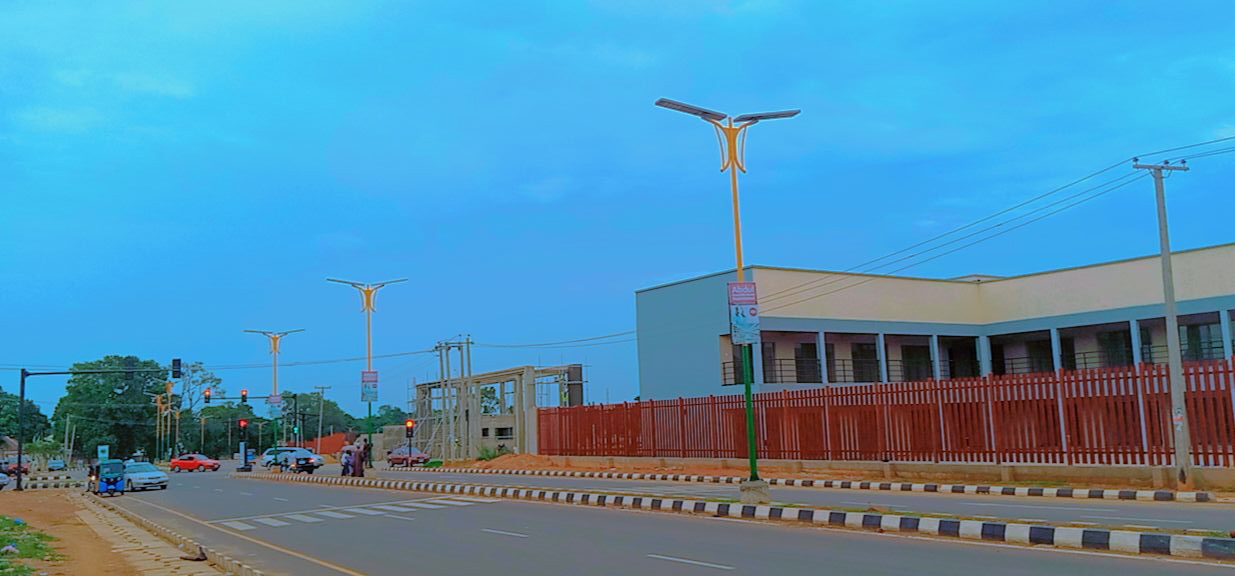
Murtala square gate and Race Course Road

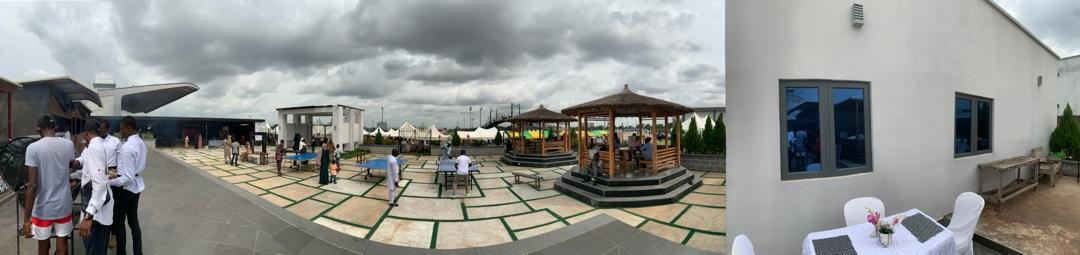
Panorama view of Murtala Square
