= Anti-Igbo sentiment =

Historical and sociological study of prejudice against the Igbo people

Anti-Igbo sentiment (also known as Igbophobia) encompasses a range of negative attitudes and feelings towards the Igbo people. The Igbo people make up a majority of the population in Nigeria's South East, and a part of the populations of the South South,"...as well as indigenous and migrant communities within the Middle Belt states of Kogi and Benue. Igbophobia can be manifested in critical and hostile behaviour such as political and religious discrimination as well as physical violence towards Igbo people.

== History ==
=== Pre-Civil War regional competition ===
Inter-ethnic frictions during the colonial era were heavily driven by regional economic competition and uneven access to Western education, which was a prerequisite for civil service and commercial employment under British administration. Following British consolidation, the Yoruba people were the first major group to extensively engage with Western-style education, followed by rapid and widespread adoption among the Igbo population as a mechanism for socioeconomic mobility.

In contrast, the Northern authorities resisted the efforts of colonialists and Christian missionaries to educate their populace, leading to an imbalance in educational attainment. Consequently, their access to employment in colonial Nigeria was hindered because Western education was a prerequisite for positions in the British-controlled industrial, commercial, and governmental sectors. While not the first major ethnic group to accept Western education, the Igbo people swiftly and overwhelmingly embraced it for many of its benefits, leveraging it as a means to ascend the social hierarchy. Eventually, this enabled them a wide range of employment opportunities in colonial Nigeria, which consequently led to the Igbo peoples' dominance in critical sectors such as the military, clerical roles, and other skilled or semi-skilled positions within the country's postal services, banking institutions, and railway services, particularly in regions like Northern Region, where local populations had traditionally shunned the educational qualifications for colonial labor. As a result, the Igbo people came to be perceived as a favored ethnic group, alongside being associated with affluence and multi-regional opportunities due to their employment by the colonial authorities and their prominence in the public sector. In a 1966 Northern publication, The Nigerian Situation: facts and background states that public services were 45% staffed by Igbo people, and it was "threatening to reach 60% by 1968." The railways (62%), ports (70%), and foreign service (75%) were even more lopsided in favor of the Igbo, who made up approximately 17% of the country. The Nigerian Railway Corporation by 1964 was said to have recorded 270 of its 431 senior posts occupied by Igbos, and the Nigerian Ports Authority also had Igbos in 73 of its 104 posts. About three-quarters of Nigeria's foreign service came from the Eastern Nigeria. This situation aroused the ire of several other ethnic groups toward the Igbo.

The migration of professionals also affected political dynamics in southern Cameroon during its administration under the Nigerian federation. Regional economic anxieties and political competition became part of themes in the Cameroonian elections of 1954, 1957, and 1959. Local political factions at times leveraged anti-Igbo rhetoric and ethnic framing to campaign against continued alignment with Nigeria. Scholars indicate that these economic and political tensions contributed the 1961 plebiscite decision by southern Cameroon to merge with the Republic of Cameroon instead of Nigeria. Though the sentiment may have exerted some pressure on southern Cameroon's choice to join Cameroon, it appears not to have been a significant issue as during the Bamiléké rebellion Igbos assisted the rebels by providing care and supplies at the border.

=== Coup d'état and anti-Igbo pogrom ===
Political and regional instability escalated dramatically following the January 1966 Nigerian coup d'état. The mutiny, led primarily by junior military officers of Eastern origin, resulted in the assassinations of high-ranking political leaders from the Northern and Western regions. Among those killed were Prime Minister Sir Abubakar Tafawa Balewa, Northern Premier Sir Ahmadu Bello, and Western Premier Samuel Akintola, alongside several senior military officers from non-Eastern backgrounds. Some some of the coup plotters indicate that the coup was originally a plan to put Awolowo in power but with the leadership figures from the Eastern region largely surviving, the event intensified severe distrust across other parts of the country, where it was widely interpreted as an ethnically motivated bid for national dominance. One of the army major Adewale Ademoyega one of the five revolutionary Nigerian Army majors who spearheaded the 1966 coup, asserted that the coup's motives were primarily national and idealistic, focused on redirecting the country's course rather than being ethnically motivated. However, at the time of the coup, Nnamdi Azikiwe, Nigeria's ceremonial President and prominent Igbo politician, was abroad on an official trip to the Caribbean. His absence and survival held significant ramifications for Nigeria's political landscape.

In July 1966, a counter-coup led predominantly by Northern military personnel unseated the government. This political breakdown was accompanied by severe civil unrest and widespread violence targeting civilian populations of Igbo and other Southern origins residing in the Northern region. Commencing in May 1966 and peaking by September, the pogroms resulted in thousands of casualties. In response to the escalating humanitarian crisis and deteriorating inter-ethnic relations, millions of displaced individuals fled to the Eastern Region. Seeking political autonomy and security guarantees, the region declared independence as the Republic of Biafra in May 1967, precipitating the Nigerian Civil War. The 1966 massacres of Southern Nigerians have been characterized by various historians and authors using differing comparative frameworks, with some drawing parallels to the Holocaust, while other scholarly analyses categorize the events within the broader frameworks of communal riots or genocide. Following the end of the hostilities and the reintegration of the Eastern Region into the federation, the subsequent restructuring of the Nigerian government left a complex legacy of political polarization and deep regional grievances.

=== Nigerian Civil War ===
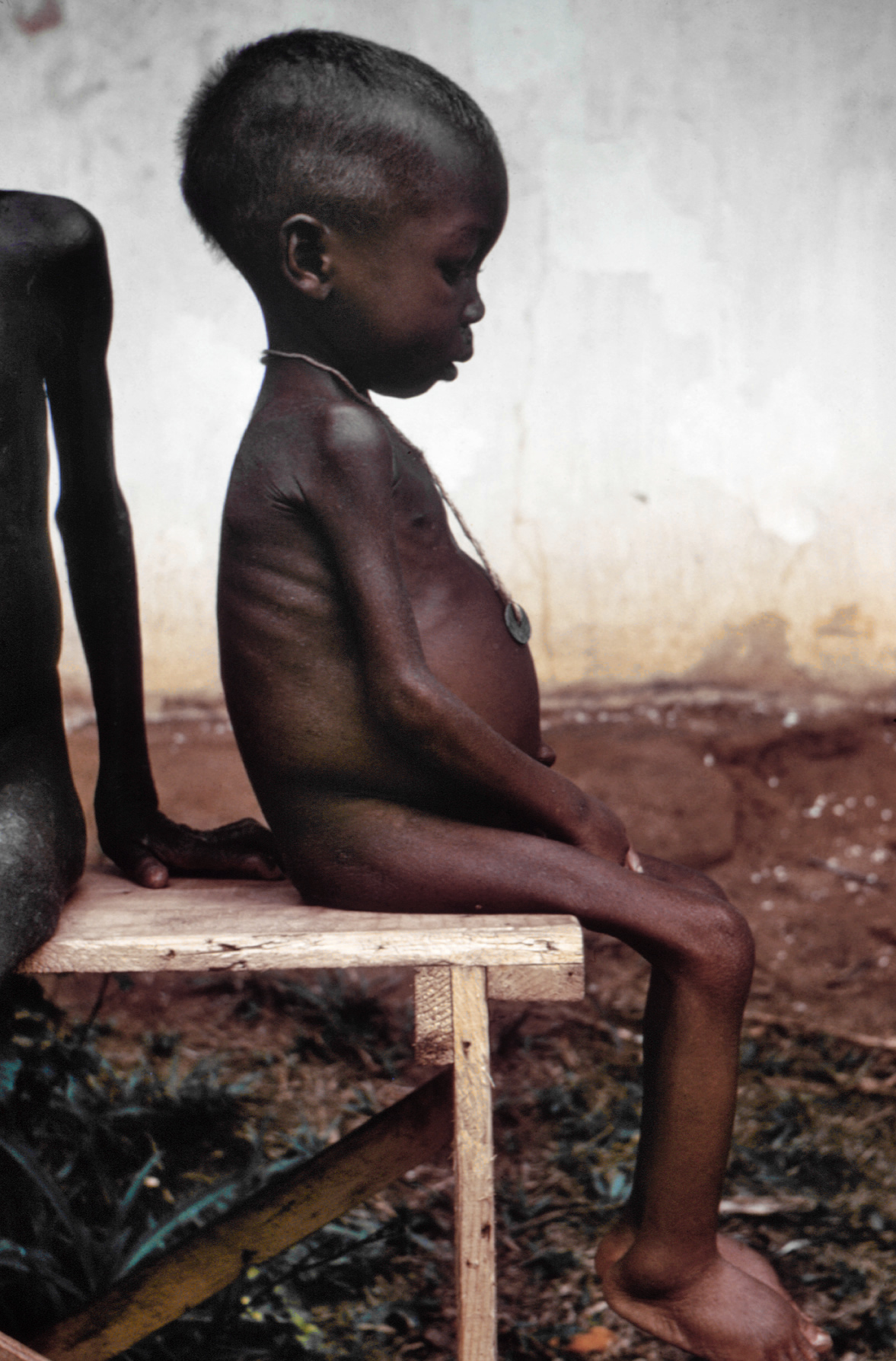
A starving Biafran girl during the Nigerian Civil War

The Republic of Biafra was a secessionist state in eastern Nigeria that existed from 30 May 1967 to January 1970. It took its name from the Bight of Biafra in the Atlantic to the south. The inhabitants were mostly Igbo people who seceded after the 1966 Nigerian counter-coup by the northern military officers. Other minority ethnic groups that were part of the republic were the Efik, Ibibio, Annang, Ejagham, Eket, Ibeno, and Ijaw, among others. During the conflict, wartime anxieties led to heightened surveillance and discrimination against Igbo residents remaining in federal territories such as Lagos. Contemporary publications documented instances of hostile rhetoric; for example, an individual account recorded in the New York Review in December 1967 quoted a local lagos policeman expressing extreme anti-Igbo hostility stating that Igbos “must be reduced considerably in number". Additionally, the federal military government instituted emergency security measures, including the mandatory registration and issuance of specialized identification cards for individuals of Igbo origin to monitor movement outside their residences.

They were required to carry their identity cards with them at all times when outside their homes. The implementation of mandatory registration led to widespread panic and rumors within the displaced Igbo community, with many fearing the data could be utilized for targeted violence. Every Igbo man and woman was issued an identity card.

— Egodi Uchendu, Women and Conflict in the Nigerian Civil War

Ethnic profiling was used to find out who was Igbo in order to kill them. In Lagos, for example, buses were often stopped and searched, with passengers made to stand in a queue with the intention of collecting names and ethnic origins of the passengers. Any Igbo or person suspected of being Igbo found in buses was executed. This was the case for the Igbos who were publicly executed in Tinubu Square in June 1968. Because of the mistreatment and brutality Igbos faced, the Igbo people devised different ways of survival. Igbo women in Lagos dropped their traditional attire and adopted the Yoruba attire (iro and buba). Igbos also stopped having conversations in public in their native Igbo, and Igbos who could speak other languages identified as other ethnic groups. During this time, businesses made sure to take out Igbo-sounding names from advertisements and signs. Many Igbo individuals during the war changed their names, such as the family of actress Stella Damasus. In a 2021 interview with Ebuka Obi-Uchendu, Stella, whose surname "Damasus" often sparks discussions and internet memes, highlighted that her family felt compelled to change their Igbo name to safeguard against potential harm or violence.

Traditional Igbo rulers in Delta state would also claim not to be Igbo to avoid the killing of their people, claiming instead to be Bini to the federal troops, though this did not stop troops from killing their people. The Igbos who remained in Nigeria during the war faced torment and brutality and were regularly used by the Nigerian government as a token to showcase and prove that Igbo were welcomed in Nigeria. The severity of persecution and brutality the Igbo faced rose and fell depending on how the war was going. The severity also rose at the mere suspicion of military advancements by the Biafran military forces.

During the war, Anioma people and other Igbo people who remained in Benin City faced attacks. Before the federal army arrived in Benin City, the Urhobo and Isoko people attacked their Anioma and Ika neighbors. Law enforcement did not help the people who were being hunted. In some cases, the Anioma and Ika people were held by the rioters for the federal soldiers instead of being killed outright. Workers of Igbo origins who were not aware of the situation in the outskirts of Benin City were stoned or clubbed to death by the local youths of Edo, Urhobo, and Isoko origins. Some Igbos who ran away were thrown into the Ikpoba river by rioters who intercepted them as they tried to escape. When federal soldiers liberated the Midwestern city of Benin from Biafran forces, it was celebrated with chaos and violence. The crowds, with the army's help, went to institutions such as NIFOR, hospitals, and prisons in the city, and killed the Igbo people there. Anyone with Igbo origins was robbed, assaulted, or killed; gender, origin, and occupation (even senior doctors were killed in the hospitals) were not considered during the rampage. This violence aimed to wipe out the Anioma people/Ika people, and other Igbos. Many who were killed believed that their good relationships with their non-Igbo friends would protect them. In Lagos, the Igbos recounted that one of their greatest discomforts was being taunted by Yoruba individuals, who urged them to leave Lagos and return to Igboland. In metropolitan centers like Lagos, social friction manifested as public harassment, with instances of local residents using the Igbo term Okoro (originally meaning "young man") in a derogatory or provocative manner within earshot of military personnel to deliberately draw suspicion toward Igbo individuals. Such behavior occasionally resulted in the arbitrary arrest or physical assault of the targeted individuals, as occurred in the case of local businessman Mr. Nzeribe, husband of author Flora Nwapa.

=== Post-war era and marginalisation ===
Following the conclusion of the Nigerian Civil War in January 1970, the reintegration of the Igbo population into the federal structure was marked by significant structural barriers and socioeconomic marginalization. In the immediate post-war era, systemic unemployment affected the displaced population; historical data indicates that out of over one million displaced or unemployed individuals, approximately 34,000 Igbos were initially reintegrated into the federal civil service.

Furthermore, the military campaigns severely degraded the physical infrastructure, commercial centers, and landscape of the former Eastern Region, halting local economic activities. Prior to the hostilities, the region had maintained robust developmental indicators, serving as the home of the University of Nigeria, Nsukka, a major national coal extraction industry, extensive agricultural initiatives, and a comprehensive regional healthcare network. However, the conflict left the region in a state of severe economic and structural devastation. Analysts note that wartime technological and industrial adaptations, such as localized petroleum refining capabilities, the operational infrastructure at Uli Airport, and tactical innovations like the Ogbunigwe munitions, were dismantled or abandoned in the post-war era rather than integrated into national development frameworks.

A significant consensus among the Igbo population holds that subsequent federal policies systematically prolonged their socioeconomic alienation. For instance, the Public Officers (Special Provisions) Decree No. 46 of 1970 led to the dismissal or compulsory retirement of numerous civil servants and military personnel who had served under the Biafran administration, running counter to public reconciliation assurances.

Furthermore, the Banking Obligations (Eastern States) Decree heavily restricted asset recovery by capping compensation for all Biafran-zone bank account holders at a flat rate of twenty Nigerian pounds, irrespective of their pre-war deposit balances, a measure widely criticized as an economic penalty. While individuals who could verify deposits made directly on the immediate eve of the war eventually secured relief through the Central Bank of Nigeria, the overarching policy severely depleted Igbo liquid capital. This capital deficit left Eastern entrepreneurs poorly positioned to participate in the enterprise acquisitions enabled by the Nigerian Enterprises Promotion Decree (Indigenisation Decree) of 1972.

Additionally, the implementation of the Abandoned Property Policy in Rivers State, which legally reassigned real estate vacated by fleeing Igbo residents during the war, inflicted a long-term economic blow to the community's asset base. In the political sphere, structural grievances persist regarding the administrative division of the country; despite its population density and historical status as one of Nigeria's foundational regions, the South-East geopolitical zone was allocated the fewest states, a layout that critics argue permanently curtails the region's federal representation and funding allocations.

== Outside Nigeria ==
In August 2019, a supremacist and secessionist who immigrated to the United Kingdom from Nigeria was arrested by British police for making YouTube videos that contained violent hate speech towards the Igbo people. In March 2022, he was sentenced to four and a half years in prison on eight counts of inciting racial hatred.

== Internet discourse and digital spaces ==
In digital spaces, anti-Igbo sentiment manifests through discriminatory rhetoric, ethnic stereotyping, and targeted harassment across major online networks. Sociological studies observe that such prejudice routinely surfaces on regional and global platforms, including the Nigerian discussion forum Nairaland, alongside X (formerly Twitter) and Facebook, where political disputes are frequently refracted through hostile ethnic framing.

During the 2023 Nigerian general and gubernatorial elections, digital spaces experienced a significant escalation in ethnic polarization. While political campaigns in Nigeria have historically intersected with regional divisions, the deployment of a paid campaign advertisement on Nairaland that explicitly utilized ethnic profiling drew widespread condemnation. Following intense pushback from netizens concerned with the potential for real-world violence, the advertisement was withdrawn. Nairaland's founder, Seun Osewa, subsequently issued a public apology to the Igbo community, though public commentators and analysts debated the timing and institutional accountability surrounding the incident.

== Political discourse and governance ==
Following the 2015 transition of federal power to the All Progressives Congress (APC), debates surrounding marginalization and political representation intensified. Prominent South-East political figures, civil society organizations, and analysts have frequently accused the federal administration of fostering systemic bias and neglecting regional balance in senior political, judicial, and security appointments. Critics argue that uneven infrastructure allocations and asymmetric political inclusion under successive administrations have reinforced long-standing structural disparities, though government spokespersons routinely maintain that appointments and policies are guided by statutory federal character principles.

== Contemporary dynamics ==
=== End SARS protests ===
The widespread civil unrest accompanying the End SARS protests against police brutality in October 2020 became a focal point for renewed ethnic friction. Following the tragic events of the Lekki shooting, metropolitan infrastructure in Lagos suffered massive arson and vandalism. In the volatile aftermath, controversial broadcast statements by Nnamdi Kanu, the leader of the separatist Indigenous People of Biafra (IPOB) group, urged his followers to target state and security infrastructure. Political opponents and certain local groups weaponized these broadcasts to attribute the broader civil destruction primarily to Igbo residents in Lagos, leading to a sharp rise in polarized ethnic rhetoric and mutual distrust between local communities. The federal government officially attributed localized violence to IPOB networks during the unrest, pointing to separatist declarations as an incitement to violence against security personnel. Concurrently, the apex Igbo socio-cultural organization, Ohanaeze Ndigbo, issued statements strongly condemning any rhetoric advocating for the destruction of infrastructure or inter-ethnic hostility in metropolitan centers.

Political analysts note that public narratives frequently conflated the actions of militant separatist factions with the broader civilian Igbo demographic. Court documents and investigative reporting later revealed that individuals arraigned for highly publicized arson incidents, including the destruction of the Oyingbo BRT terminal and the looting of the Palace of the Oba of Lagos, crossed multiple regional and ethnic lines, contradicting initial statements by federal officials attributing the acts exclusively to Eastern separatist networks. Nonetheless, these narratives were subsequently weaponized by political actors during the 2023 electoral cycle to argue for the exclusion or marginalization of Igbo professionals from federal and regional administrative appointments.

=== Anti-Igbo sentiment in electoral campaigns ===
==== 2015 elections ====
During the 2015 gubernatorial campaign, ethnic rhetoric intensified significantly following public remarks made by the Oba of Lagos stated that Igbos who do not vote for Akinwunmi Ambode will perish in the lagoon within seven days.The circulating audio recording drew widespread condemnation from human rights organizations, legal commentators, and prominent entertainment figures who asserted the constitutional right of all citizens to electoral self-determination regardless of cultural origin.

==== 2019 elections ====
The 2019 electoral cycle similarly experienced a resurgence of targeted ethnic framing. Political campaigns routinely deployed xenophobic rhetoric against opposition candidates to undermine their local legitimacy. For instance, People's Democratic Party (PDP) candidate Jimi Agbaje faced intensive digital campaigns that falsely characterized his ancestry as Eastern, applying the derogatory hybrid moniker "Jimichukwu" (blending his first name with the Igbo word Chukwu) to delegitimize his eligibility to contest for leadership within the South-West geopolitical zone. Conversely, public figures were frequently subjected to digital misinformation; media investigations and independent fact-checkers confirmed that multiple viral quotes and videos attributed to senior political figures, intended to incite inter-ethnic hostility between Yoruba and Igbo residents, were structurally manipulated or fabricated entirely.

==== 2023 elections ====
The emergence of Peter Obi as a major third-party presidential contender under the Labour Party in the 2023 election altered national electoral dynamics, accompanied by an influx of ethnically polarized discourse. Political commentators observe that his campaign was frequently dismissed by opponents not on policy grounds, but through reductive frameworks characterizing it as an exclusive ethnic vehicle for Eastern regional hegemony rather than a diverse national platform.

This political environment saw several cultural figures publish explicitly hostile statements online targeting the Igbo collective. Recording artist Brymo faced severe public backlash and institutional petitions after releasing public broadcasts declaring that the Igbo demographic was collectively unsuited for national leadership and directing explicit derogatory profanities at the community via digital platforms. This rhetoric prompted a widespread online petition on Change.org addressed to the All Africa Music Awards (AFRIMA), demanding the retraction of his nomination for Songwriter of the Year, which garnered over 28,000 signatures.

During the broader 2023 cycle, civil rights organizations reported instances of systemic disenfranchisement targeting Igbo residents in metropolitan centers. Documented incidents included physical obstructions and assaults at local Permanent Voter Card (PVC) collection centers, alongside administrative controversies involving the Lagos State Resident Electoral Commissioner (REC), Olusegun Agbaje, whose public commentary regarding local distribution logistics was criticized by civil society groups as biased. Social and economic friction also manifested as targeted vandalism, including incidents of arson at commercial markets with a high density of Igbo traders, alongside threats from political thugs aimed at restricting commercial access based on perceived voting patterns.

In the weeks leading up to the 2023 Lagos State gubernatorial election, Labour Party candidate Gbadebo Rhodes-Vivour, who is of mixed Yoruba and Igbo parentage, became a primary target of xenophobic campaigns. Opponents and political commentators repeatedly weaponized his maternal lineage and his spouse's Igbo identity to challenge his cultural legitimacy to contest for office within the South-West region. These narratives extended to the wider demographic, with political actors publicly questioning the participation of non-indigenous populations in local governance.

Three days prior to the polls, prominent political figure Musiliu Akinsanya (popularly known as MC Oluomo) issued public warnings directing residents who did not intend to support the ruling party to remain home on election day. The broadcast drew intense demands from opposition parties for his immediate arrest on charges of voter intimidation, though a Nigeria Police Force spokesperson subsequently downplayed the severity of the statement, characterizing it as a non-literal joke, a stance that drew sharp public criticism.

On election day, widespread voter profiling resulted in physical harassment and exclusion at various polling stations. Civil rights monitors noted that individuals presumed to look of Eastern origin, including voters of non-Igbo extraction, were targeted by political thugs to prevent them from casting ballots. Multiple high-profile accounts documented this trend; for instance, prominent Yoruba lifestyle commentator and YouTuber Sisi Yemmie and her spouse were publicly barred from accessing their polling unit after local actors declared their physical appearance as matching the profiled demographic. This profiling environment led to a documented rise in mutual communal distrust and localized security incidents across metropolitan markets and residential neighborhoods in the immediate post-election period.

Online spaces and paid campaign advertisements experienced an influx of ethnically polarized messaging during the gubernatorial phase. Civil security breaches were reported immediately following the polls, including documented physical clashes and localized security incidents affecting residents in the Abule Ado district of Lagos State.

=== Political rhetoric and campaign narratives ===
During the 2023 electoral cycle, groups propagating anti-Igbo rhetoric advanced several distinct geopolitical arguments to mobilize support. A primary focal point was the contested political and cultural definition of the metropolitan center, heavily centered around the controversial phrase "Lagos is no man's land." Historically, the phrase is traced back to prominent Eastern politician Jaja Wachuku in 1947, who utilized it to emphasize the status of Lagos as a shared, multicultural federal capital territory belonging equally to all Nigerian citizens. The expression was subsequently invoked in an administrative context by Lateef Jakande during his inaugural address as Governor of Lagos State in 1979 to highlight municipal inclusivity.

During the 2023 campaigns, regional commentators and political figures repurposed the slogan, presenting it as an active declaration of non-indigenous hegemony. Opponents of the third-party movement weaponized this framing, asserting that the political mobilization of migrant populations constituted an attempt to displace the indigenous Yoruba cultural ownership of the state. Sociologists and fact-checkers observed that while the phrase was not widely used as a formal mobilization slogan by the Igbo community, its digital dissemination was highly effective in generating anxiety regarding regional self-determination. In response, multiple apex Igbo cultural organizations and prominent figures published public statements formally disavowing the phrase and affirming their respect for the historical and indigenous status of Lagos State.

Following the elections, the political debate shifted to the legislative sphere. Mudashiru Obasa, the Speaker of the Lagos State House of Assembly, announced an indigenous-focused legislative agenda upon his re-election for a third consecutive term. Obasa declared that Lagos was historically Yoruba territory and proposed specific legislative frameworks designed to mandate the translation of local statutes into the Yoruba language, alongside the introduction of new economic regulations governing property acquisition and corporate ownership to explicitly prioritize the state's indigenous populations.

Another key narrative deployed during the cycle was the systematic link drawn by political opponents between the Labour Party's "Obidient" movement and the secessionist Indigenous People of Biafra (IPOB). Critics and rival party campaigns frequently alleged that presidential candidate Peter Obi maintained a tacit alignment with Eastern separatist groups, arguing that his campaign messaging avoided explicit, unilateral denunciations of IPOB's regional operations to retain his regional voter base, an accusation that his platform consistently rejected as an attempt at political profiling. Digital campaigns frequently focused on Peter Obi's regional background, with opposition critics characterizing his platform as a front for Biafran agitation rather than a conventional national candidacy. Media analysts observed that while IPOB leadership explicitly disavowed any institutional links to Obi's campaign, demands for him to account for regional separatist activities remained a central campaign theme. Commentators pointed out a double standard in this profiling, noting that prominent presidential contenders from other regions, such as Bola Tinubu and Atiku Abubakar, were not similarly pressured by mainstream media to account for militant or secessionist factions operating within their respective home zones.

Beyond secessionist allegations, campaigns routinely alleged that the "Obidient" movement concealed a hidden ethnocentric agenda, prompting calls for non-Igbo voters to withdraw their support. In response to these recurring charges, Obi issued public statements emphasizing that his platform was built on constitutional and cross-ethnic national reform rather than regional considerations, rejecting any religious or cultural exceptionalism within the movement.

=== After-effects of the 2023 elections ===
Sociological reporting indicated that the structural friction generated during the 2023 electoral cycle caused a significant deterioration in inter-communal and commercial relations across metropolitan centers. Civil society groups noted that the absence of swift federal penalties or state-led reconciliatory frameworks facilitated a persistent environment of social alienation and commercial vulnerability for Igbo residents.

Following a series of real estate enforcement actions and market demolitions that disproportionately affected areas with a high density of Eastern traders, various community leaders renewed historical calls for the relocation of Igbo capital, businesses, and investments back to the South-East geopolitical zone to guarantee asset security.

Concurrently, regional administrative shifts reinforced local anxieties; the Lagos State Government's transition toward utilizing the Yoruba language for official digital communications and public notifications drew sharp criticism from civil commentators, who argued the policy undermined the inclusive, cosmopolitan character of the federation's economic capital.There were also Yoruba cultural groups who called on companies that have locations within the southwestern part of the country to allocate 90% of their job opportunities to Yoruba people.

== See also ==
- Radio Nigeria Kaduna
