= Fifth Chukker Polo and Country Club =

Equestrian center in Igabi, Kaduna, Nigeria

Fifth Chukker Polo and Country Club is a three thousand hectare equestrian site with three polo fields and lodging facilities, within Kangimi Resorts situated along Kaduna - Jos road in Igabi local government area of Kaduna State, Nigeria. The club was founded in 2001 and hosts private polo tournaments and two annual polo championships, a charity shield tournament and the Africans Patrons Club. Adjoining the club lawns is Kangimi Dam, the club promoters in cooperation with Kaduna State government initiated a public-private sector agreement to further develop Kangimi resorts with additions that will include a golf lawn and to expand lifestyle choices for visitors.

The field has played host to international professional polo players, the club supports some social responsible causes, partly a move to shed the elitist image of the game and also bring attention to the plight of children from different backgrounds.
