= Kaduna Polo Club =

Polo sport centre

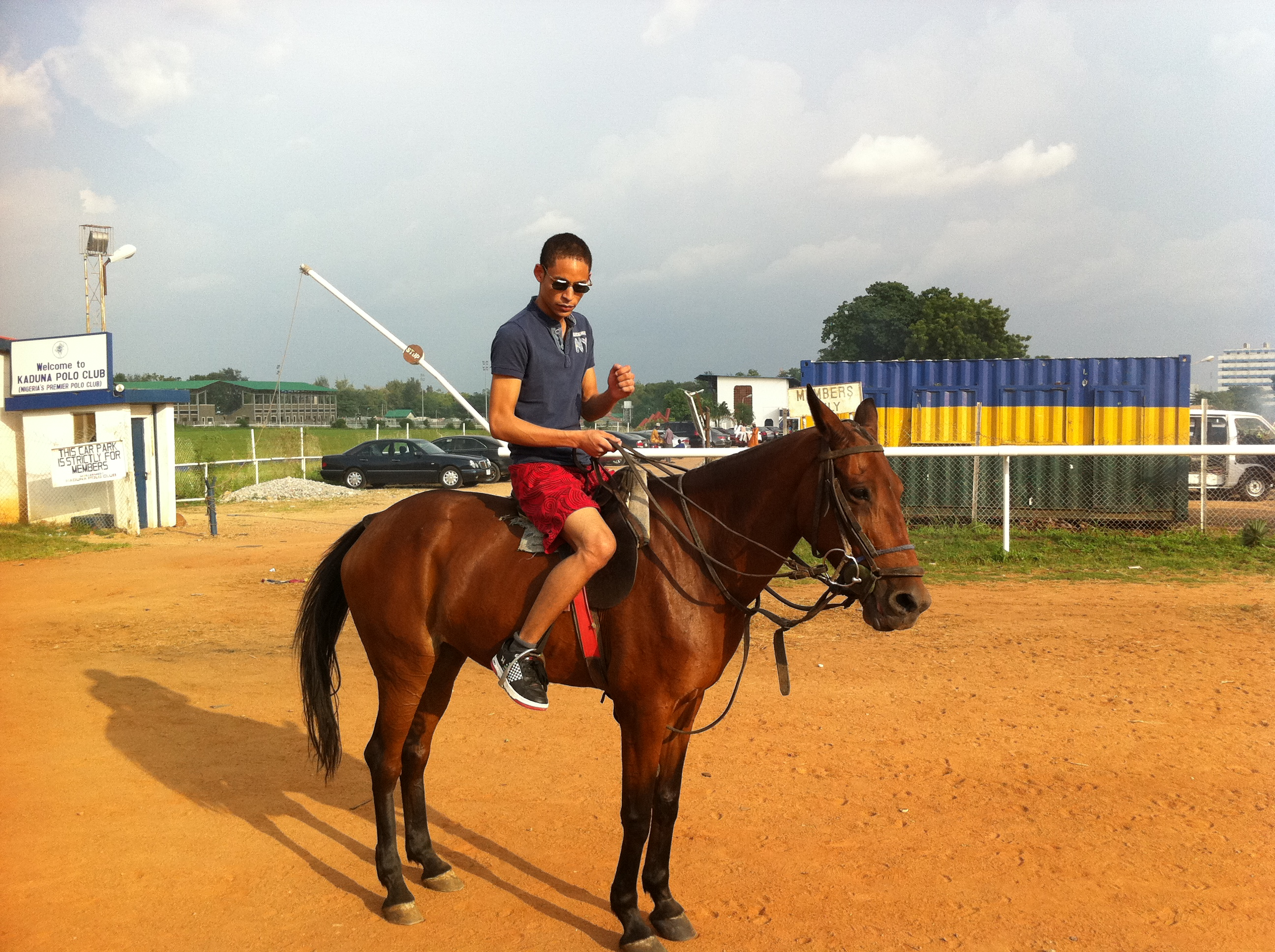
- Kaduna Polo Club entrance
- Location: Murtala Mohammed Square Kaduna; Kaduna State, Nigeria.
- Surface: Natural Grass
- Acreage: 250

Construction
- Opened: 1918, 108 years ago

Kaduna International Polo Club is one of the oldest polo club in Nigeria. It is located in Kaduna state at the Murtala Ramat Mohammed Square.

== History ==
It was founded in 1918, the Patron of the club is His Royal Highness Alhaji Abdulmumini Kabir Usman emir of Katsina State, while the current president of the club is Alhaji Muhammad Babangida, son of a past Nigerian Head of State Ibrahim Badamasi Babangida. Kaduna Polo club has celebrated its centenary during the 2018 Kaduna Polo Tournament, which took place on 13 to 21 October 2018. The event which was termed as 'Kaduna polo centenary tournament' or 'Tournament as celebration of Legacy' was contested by about forty teams from different states across Nigeria, they included teams from Port Harcourt Polo clubs, Ibadan Polo clubs, Abuja Guards Brigade Polo club, Kano Polo clubs, and Lagos Polo clubs.

== Noble prizes ==
Among the biggest prizes of the tournament are the Georgian Cup, the Emir of Katsina Cup, and the IMANI Cup. The Kaduna-based El-Amin Polo Team won fourteenth(14th) titles of the Georgian Cup the highest than any other team, while the second highest title owners is the Abuja Rubicon team with 12 titles.
