= Usman Nagogo =

Emir of Katsina (1905-1981)

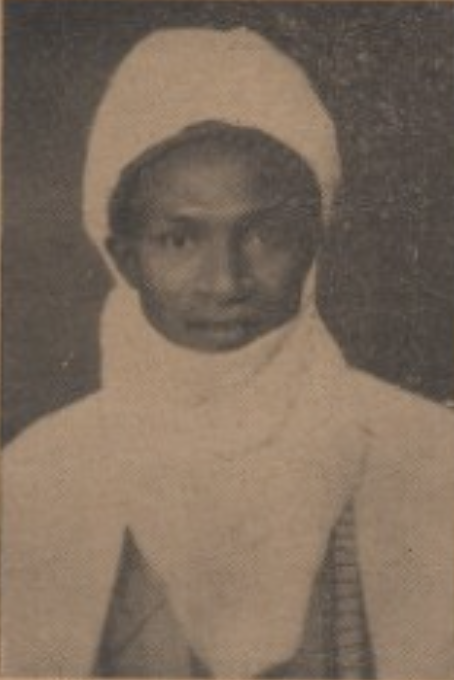
- Portrait published in issue 239 of Gaskiya Ta Fi Kwabo

Emir of Katsina
- Reign: 19 May 1944 – 18 March 1981
- Predecessor: Muhammadu Dikko
- Successor: Muhammadu Kabir Usman
- Born: 1905; Katsina
- Died: 18 March 1981 (aged 75–76)
- Issue: Muhammadu Kabir Usman; Hassan Katsina
- Father: Muhammadu Dikko

Alhaji Sir Usman Nagogo dan Muhammadu Dikko KBE CMG (1905 – 18 March 1981) was Emir of Katsina (Sarkin Katsina) from 19 May 1944, until his death. A Fulani from the Sullubawa Clan, he succeeded his father, Muhammadu Dikko, as Emir, and was succeeded by his son, Muhammadu Kabir Usman.

== Education ==
Nagogo commenced his education under Islamic scholar Attahiru, who taught the future Emir and his brother in Katsina's Gambarawa Quarters. He commenced his elementary education in 1921 at Katsina Provincial School, but was interrupted by his father's visit to England, where the two met King George V of the United Kingdom. He graduated from the provincial school in 1923, after which he taught there for six months.

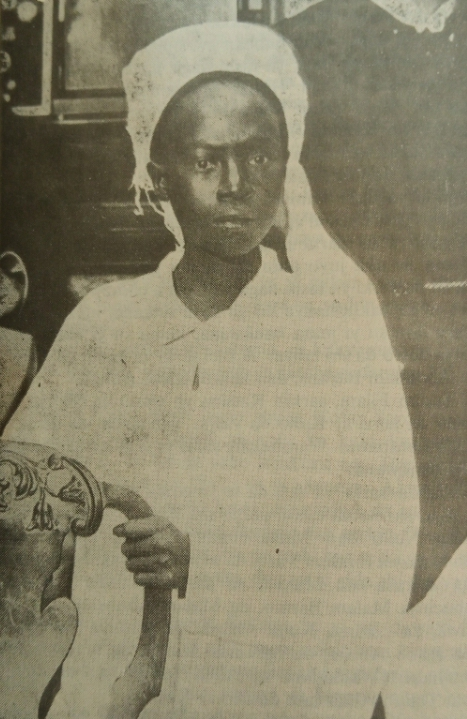
Usman as a child

== Political career and reign as Emir ==
Nagogo was appointed to position of Native Authority Police Chief in 1929; during his term he expanded the police department by erecting new buildings and hiring more officers. In 1937, he became the District Head of Katsina Metropolis.

Nagogo was officially installed as the tenth Emir of Katsina by Arthur Richards, Governor of Northern Nigeria, on May 19, 1944, although he had succeeded his deceased father to the position in March. The same year, he visited England, Egypt, India, and Burma; in Burma, he met with Nigerians in the Royal West African Frontier Force (fighting for the United Kingdom as part of the Chindits).

On January 12, 1946, King George VI of the United Kingdom appointed him as a federal minister of the colony. He was a regional minister without portfolio from 1952 until the military coup of 1966, which one of his sons, Hassan Katsina was involved in.

Life President of the Nigerian Polo Association, Nagogo was one of pioneers of indigenous Nigerian polo; as of 2002, his handicap of +7 is still the highest of any African. He was at one point chairman of Muslim religious organization Jama'atu Nasril Islam (JNI).

== Family ==
Nagogo's mother was Hassatu, from Katsina.

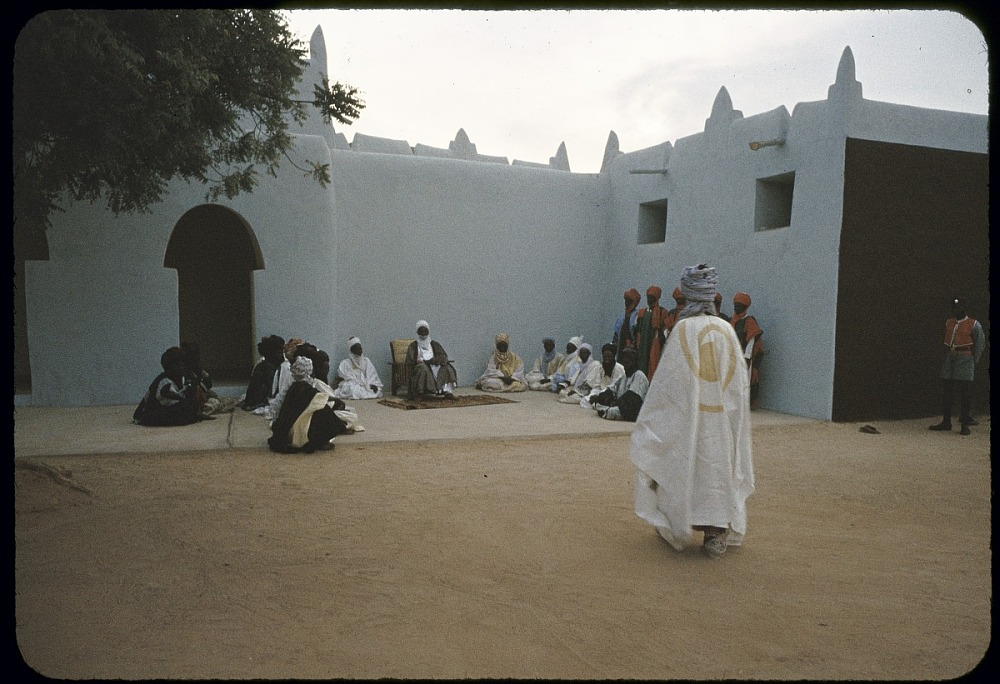
Nagogo receives guests at his palace in 1959

One of Nagogo's sons, Muhammadu Kabir Usman (born January 1928), succeeded his father as Emir upon Nagogo's death, and was Emir as of 2006; Kabir received his name from Arab cleric Sherif Gudid, a friend of Nagogo. Another son, Hassan Katsina (born 1933), joined the Nigerian Army, eventually rising to the position of Major General and was appointed Governor of Northern Nigeria after the 1966 January coup.

== Honours ==
Nagogo was appointed a Commander of the Order of the British Empire (CBE) in the 1948 New Year Honours, and invested as a Knight Commander of the Order (KBE) in the 1962 New Year Honours. He was appointed a Companion of the Order of St Michael and St George (CMG) in the 1953 Coronation Honours.

Preceded by Muhammadu Dikko	Emir of Katsina; May 19, 1944 – March 18, 1981	Succeeded by Muhammadu Kabir Usman
