= Abdulmumini Kabir Usman =

Nigerian monarch (born 1949)

Emir of Katsina
- Tenure: 13 March 2008 – present
- Coronation: 13 March 2008
- Predecessor: Muhammadu Kabir Usman
- Born: 9 January 1949 (age 77)
- Dynasty: Sullubawa
- Father: Muhammadu Kabir Usman Nagogo
- Mother: Hajiya Amina [Hajia Uwar Hamza ]
- Religion: Sunni Islam

Abdulmumini Kabir Usman (born 9 January 1949) is the Emir of Katsina. A Fulani from the Sullubawa clan, he is the chancellor of the University of Ilorin and a former chancellor of Obafemi Awolowo University. He is the 50th emir of Katsina chronologically and the 4th from Sullubawa dynasty succeeding his father Muhammadu Kabir Usman.
