= Muhammadu Dikko =

47th Emir of Katsina

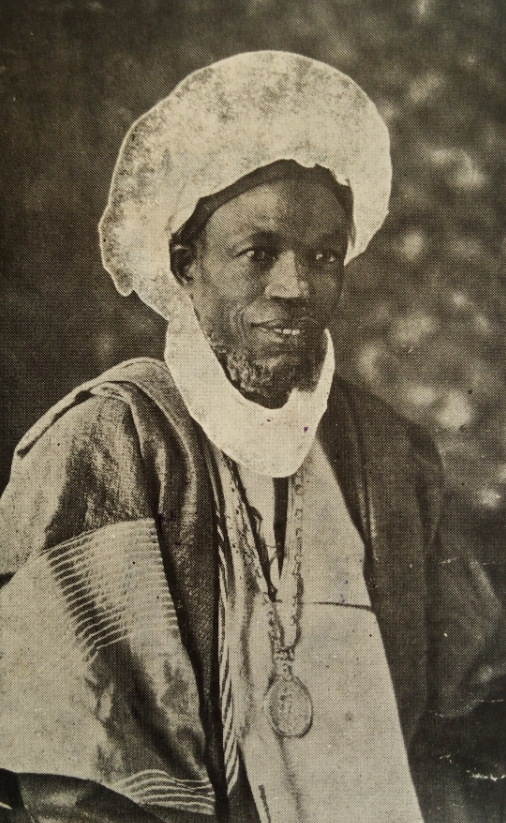

Emir of Katsina
- Reign: 1906 – 1944
- Predecessor: Yero
- Successor: Usman Nagogo
- Born: 1865; Katsina Emirate, Sokoto Caliphate
- Died: 1944 (aged 78–79); Katsina, Colonial Nigeria
- Spouse: 4, including Hajiya Ma'daki (m. 1914)
- Issue: Usman Nagogo
- Father: Muhammadu Gidado

Muhammadu Dikko also known as Muhammad Dikko dan Gidado CBE (1865 – May 1944), was the 47th Emir of Katsina from 9 November 1906 until his death in 1944. He was the ninth Fulani emir, as well as the first emir from the current ruling Sullubawa dynasty, succeeding Yero dan Musa, the last emir from the Dallazawa dynasty which was installed by the Jihad of Usman dan Fodio. He came to power shortly after British rule began in 1903 following the signing of a treaty between the then Emir, Abubakar dan Ibrahim, and British officials. He was a brother to Binta the paternal grand mother of Shehu Musa Yar'adua and Umaru Musa Yar'adua, he was succeeded by his son Usman Nagogo who held the title of Emir from 1944 until his death in 1981. He and his entourage were photographed on multiple occasions.

== Early life and education ==
Dikko was born in 1865, during the reign of emir Muhammadu Bello, to Muhammadu Gidado, who held the powerful title of Durbi, one of the king-makers, and his wife Ta-Malamai. Dikko received Islamic education from the scholars of Katsina at Tsagero from an early age. In 1882, when Dikko was still young, the Emir Ibrahim died, and Musa, an old enemy of Gidado, became emir. He confiscated the family's properties, stripped Gidado of the Durbi title and gave it to his own son Yero. This brought hardship to Dikko, but Musa's death and the ascension of his younger rival and Ibrahim's son Abubakar brought reprieve. Yero was stripped of the title and Dikko's uncle Muhammadu Sada, a brother to Gidado was appointed. Abubakar also imprisoned Yero accusing him of the murder of Gidado.

== Durbi ==
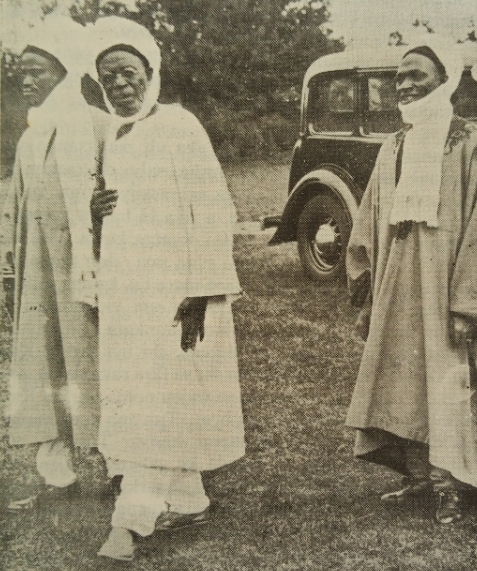

Being well educated and from a noble family, Dikko was given the title "Karshi" (currently held by one of his great-grandchildren) by Abubakar Dikko who was a warrior, and fought bravely in many of Katsina's wars with Maradi, further earning the trust and admiration of Abubakar, who appointed him Durbi (Sada having died before), his father's old title, making him the district head of Mani. It is said that this happened after a battle, and Abubakar was so astonished by Dikko's bravery, that he removed his own turban and used it to bestow the Durbi title on Dikko.

Being Durbi brought Dikko even more closer to the emir, earning him more power and prestige, but bringing along a lot more responsibility, enemies, and new friends. Among Dikko's friends and confidants was Mallam Haruna, a scholar and prince from Kanon-Bakashe (now in Niger), who had settled at Tsagero, a town close to Katsina, where the Emir's children and other nobles were taken to study then, and where Dikko himself was educated. Dikko was given the responsibility of leading many more battles, he was also given the task of monitoring the civil war in Kano, where two claimants, Tukur and Alu, were fighting over the emirship. Dikko is said to have had the dream of one day becoming emir himself, and his quick rise to power and his increasing popularity were said to have worried the emir. Before the death of Sada, he had instructed Dikko to obey and be loyal to Abubakar.

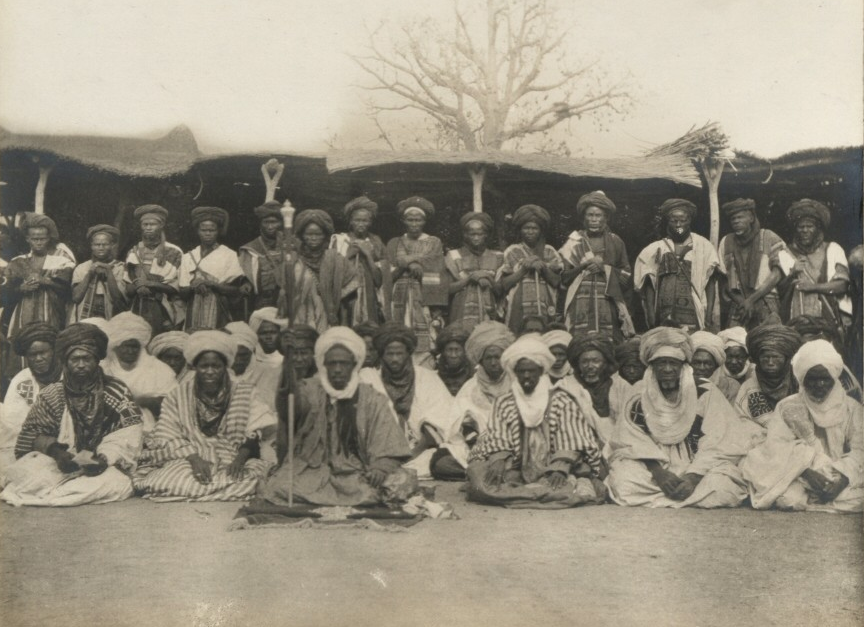
The Emir of Katsena with officials in 1911 at Katsina

== The arrival of the British and rise to the throne ==
In April 1903, the British army, led by Lord Frederick Lugard arrived at the gates of Katsina. Having already conquered most of Hausaland, including nearby Kano and the Sokoto, the capital of the caliphate established by Danfodio, the British were welcome by the emir, and Katsina surrendered without a fight.

The arrival of the British created a dilemma for emir Abubakar, who feared that the British may depose and exile him if he offended them, as they did to other emirs of conquered territories, but was not too eager to please them either. Abubakar was also worried about further disappointing the Katsina people, who were already angry over his surrender to people they saw as infidels, who had come to destroy legacy of Dan Fodio's jihad. This led to the emir appointing Dikko as his liaison with the British, also being responsible for their welfare and the provision of supplies. Abubakar enjoyed some degree of autonomy, but was often in disagreement with the British and their policies.

The appointment of Dikko has been interpreted by some as an attempt by the emir to insulate himself from having to interact directly with the British, it has also been accused by some to be a plot by the emir, because Dikko might offend the British, and he might be taken away, ridding the emir of a powerful potential rival. However, Dikko tried hard to please the British and earn their trust. The British were not comfortable with Abubakar as emir, because of the disagreements he had with them, as well as the influence that the palace chiefs and the nobles had on him, making their policy of indirect rule ineffective. In late 1904, a dead dog was found in the British resident R.E Olivier's well. Abubakar was blamed, and he was removed and exiled to Ilorin in January 1905.

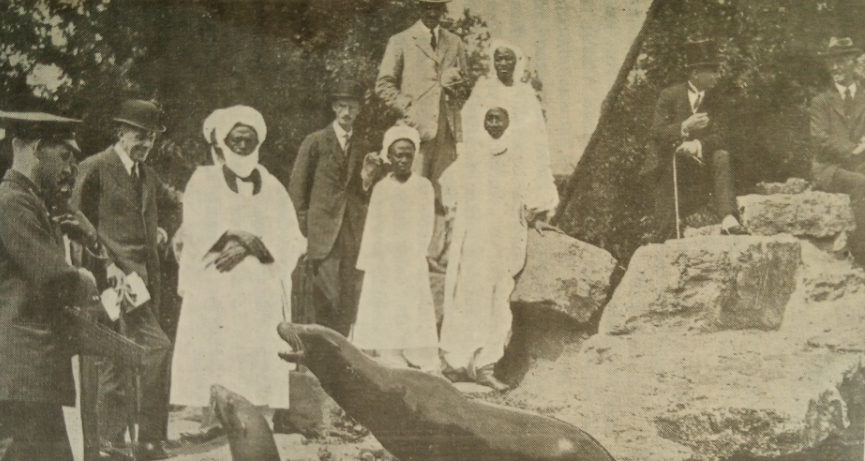
Muhammad Dikko visit to England Museum.

Needing a loyal emir, Yero, former emir Musa's son, a rival of Abubakar, the British assumed, would be loyal to them and would most certainly not be influenced by Abubakar's loyal courtiers. Olivier, was said to have warned Yero that henceforth all dismissals and appointments had to be approved by the British, but Yero resented the British and was poised to have his way. He dismissed many officials, including Abubakar's sons, replacing them with his supporters and loyalists. He also used his own court to overrule judgements given by the British and the local judges.

In February 1905, Olivier was transferred and Herbert Richmond Palmer was brought to Katsina as resident. Not long after he arrived, Palmer indicated his desire to undertake reforms in the judiciary and reorganize the districts, Yero disagreed and never cooperated. Meanwhile, there was an uprising in Sokoto, and Palmer was instructed to immediately move to Kano. Before leaving, he instructed Yero to look after what he was leaving behind. Yero, thinking that the British had left permanently, ordered his men to loot the properties. When the British eventually returned, Palmer asked Yero to provide labour and materials to rebuild the looted properties, but neither Yero nor his loyal officials were willing to comply.

Meanwhile, the British needed a supply of camels and firearms, and the trusted Dikko was sent by Palmer to Agadez to make the purchase. While Dikko was away, on November 9, 1906, Palmer got tired of Yero's antics and deposed him, accusing him of incompetence and insubordination. Yero was exiled to Lokoja, and Palmer announced Dikko's appointment as the interim emir, even though he was not from the ruling Dallazawa clan. The expected heirs to the throne, including the Yarima (crown prince), were overlooked in Dikko's favour.

Dikko returned, oblivious to his new status as the emir, and was at Katsina's famous Kofar Sauri gate, when a man accosted him and ran towards him, and on meeting him, bowed down and greeted him in the style that only the emir was greeted, the man also praised Dikko as the "Sarki" of Katsina. Dikko was baffled by the man's behaviour, and asked him if he had gone mad, but the man broke the news to him of Yero's deposition, and his subsequent appointment as emir. Dikko, who had caught a Guinea worm infection, was unable to ride a horse, and had made his return journey from Agadez on a camel, he first stopped at his house at Kofar Sauri, before being escorted to the palace by cheering supporters.

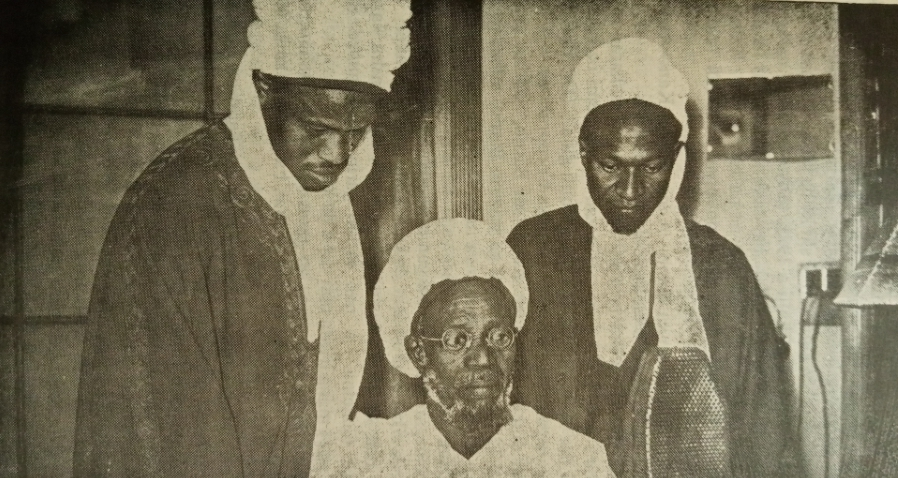
Muhammad Dikko in BBC

Dikko cooperated well with the British throughout the time he was acting emir, and on 25 January 1907, the visiting acting British High Commissioner; William Wallace confirmed Dikko as the new emir of Katsina.

== Reign (1906–1944) ==
Dikko faced stiff resistance from the deposed Dallazawa and their loyalists, who saw him as an usurper and a stooge imposed by the British. Dikko consolidated his position by appointing many of his loyalists to key posts, including his Friend Mallam Haruna, who was appointed as the first ever Waziri (second-in-command) of Katsina. Dikko also strengthened his relationship with many of the district heads and nobles by marrying out his daughters to them.

During Dikko's reign, various reforms were initiated, they include the introduction of various taxation systems, and the departmentalization of the native authourity, with his son Usman Nagogo becoming the head of the Police department 1929. Nagogo was later made Magajin gari, the district head of Katsina metropolis in 1937, making him the closest of the princes to his father. Another major reform was the relocation of the district heads, who had previously lived inside Katsina, to their various districts. This relocation also somehow affected Dikko himself, as his closest confidant and second-in-command, Mallam Haruna, was reappointed by the British as a district head and relocated to Kaita, and the Waziri title was given to Mallam Zayyana. Dikko also built a hospital and established the famous Katsina College, the first secondary school in Northern Nigeria in 1922. Dikko promoted western education, giving some of his own children to study under the British, and encouraging other nobles to do so as well.

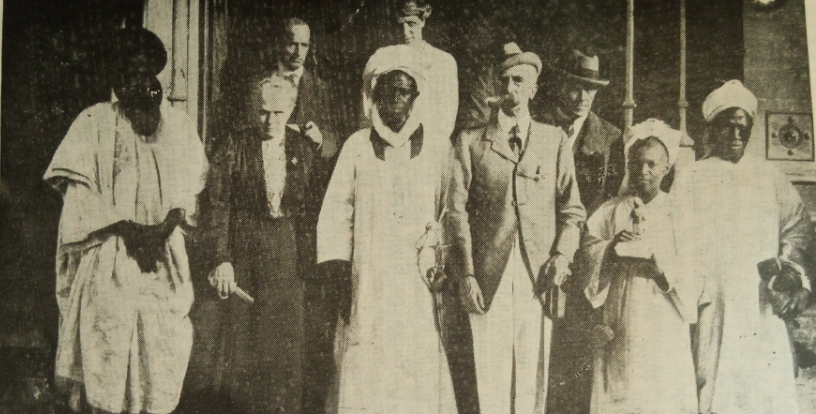
With British in 1911

In 1935, Dikko demolished and reconstructed the mosque built by the Dallazawa clan's patriarch, Ummarun Dallaje. The mosque became known as Masallacin Dutsi. He also became the first reigning emir to go to Mecca for Hajj, doing so by car in 1921, from where he also became the first emir to go to England, where he and his entourage met King George V, and visited the famous London Zoo. Dikko returned England in 1924 and 1937.

After the British conquest, Katsina was no longer at war with anybody. Dikko, a skilled horseman himself, encouraged the use of Katsina's hitherto war horses for sports like racing and Polo. He dedicated and constructed a large Polo ground, which is still in use today. Dikko encouraged his own sons and other nobles to play the sport. Dikko's son and successor, Usman Nagogo, attained a handicap of +7, the highest ever attained by an African. Dikko's successors still hold the life presidency of the Nigerian Polo association.

== Death and succession ==
Dikko died in early 1944 after suffering from an illness, leading to a succession struggle. On one hand were the Dallazawa princes led by the powerful Yarima, a descendant of emir Abubakar, who felt that the emirship was theirs by right, and on the other hand were Dikko's powerful sons who also tussled between themselves for the throne. In March 1944, the king-makers settled for Dikko's younger son Usman Nagogo, who was the clear choice of the British because of his sound western education, as well as his closeness to his father. Nagogo was turbaned on 19 May 1944. Dikko is buried in a garden inside the Katsina emir's palace. The all-seater Muhammadu Dikko Stadium and a street in Katsina town are named after him.

== Gallery ==
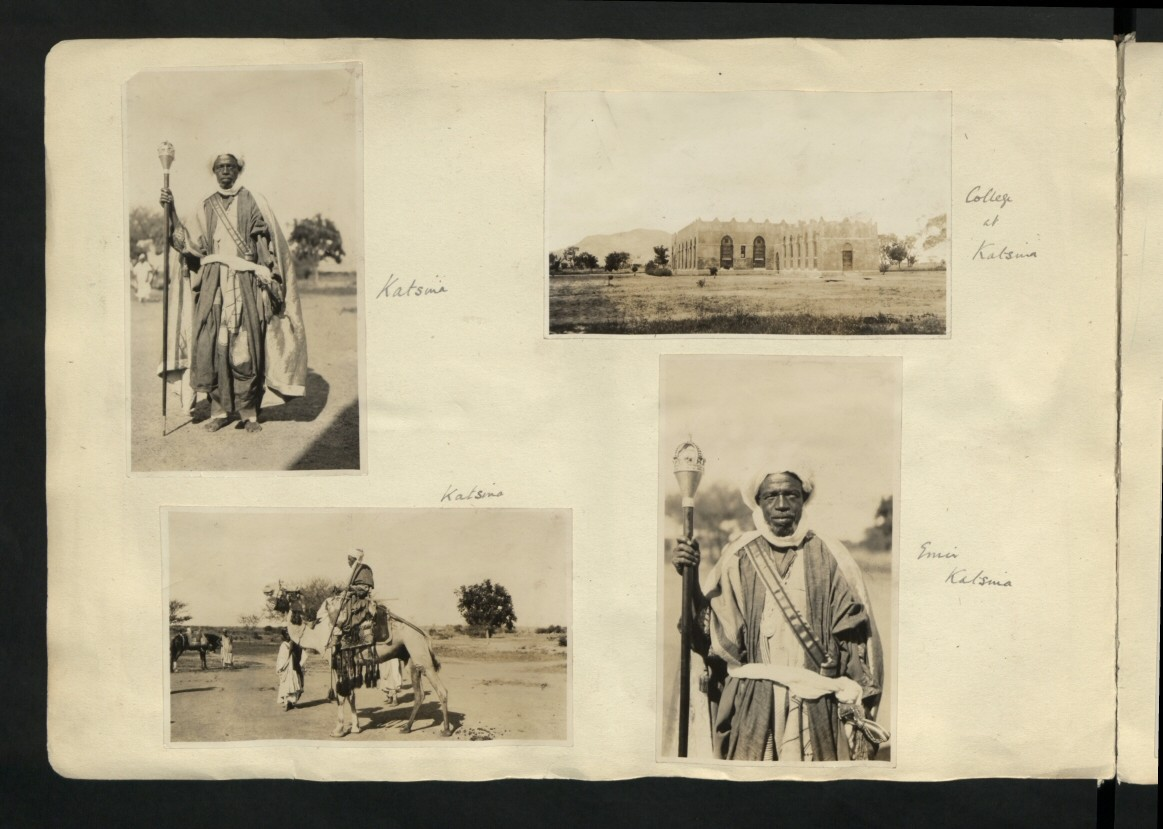
Photos of Muhammad Dikko dan Gidado, ca. 1910

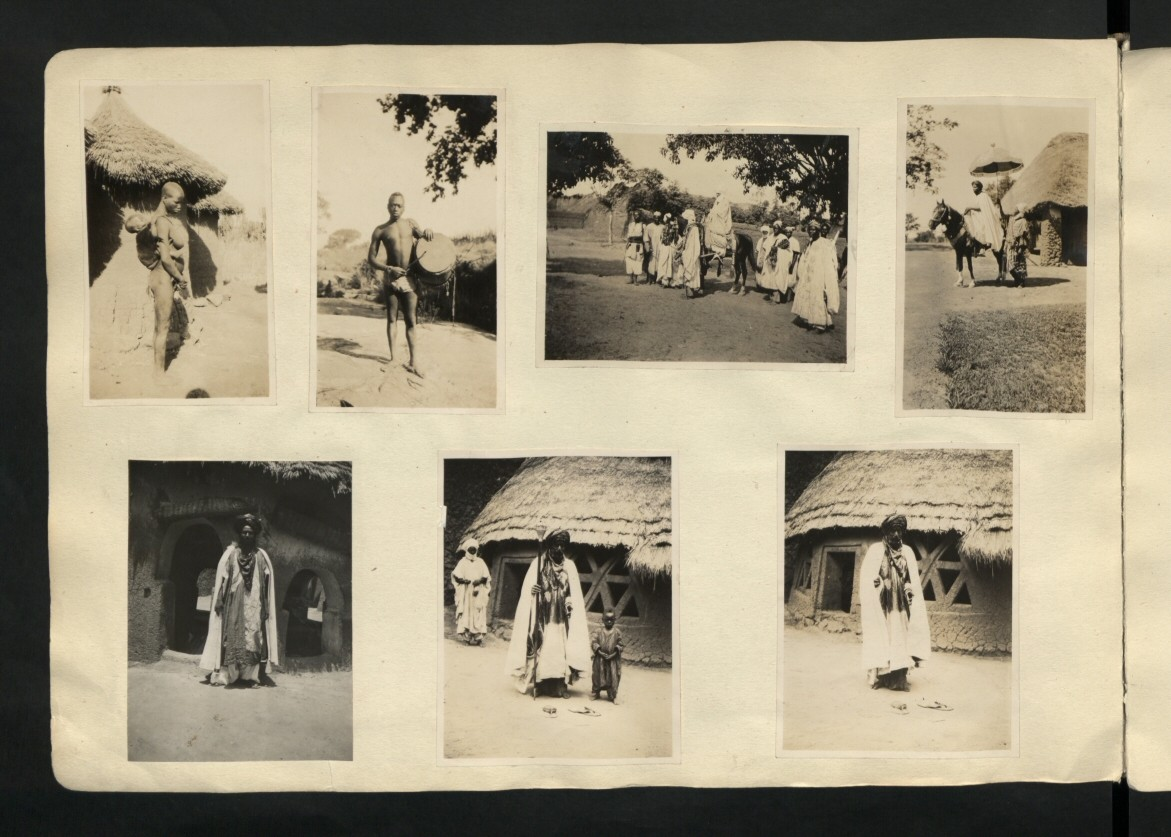
Photos of Muhammad Dikko dan Gidado, ca. 1910
