= 2023 Zamfara State gubernatorial election =

2023 gubernatorial election in Zamfara State, Nigeria

- 18 March 2023
- Registered: 1,926,870
Nominee	Dauda Lawal	Bello Matawalle
Party	PDP	APC
Running mate	Mani Mallam Mummuni	Hassan Nasiha
Popular vote	377,726	311,976
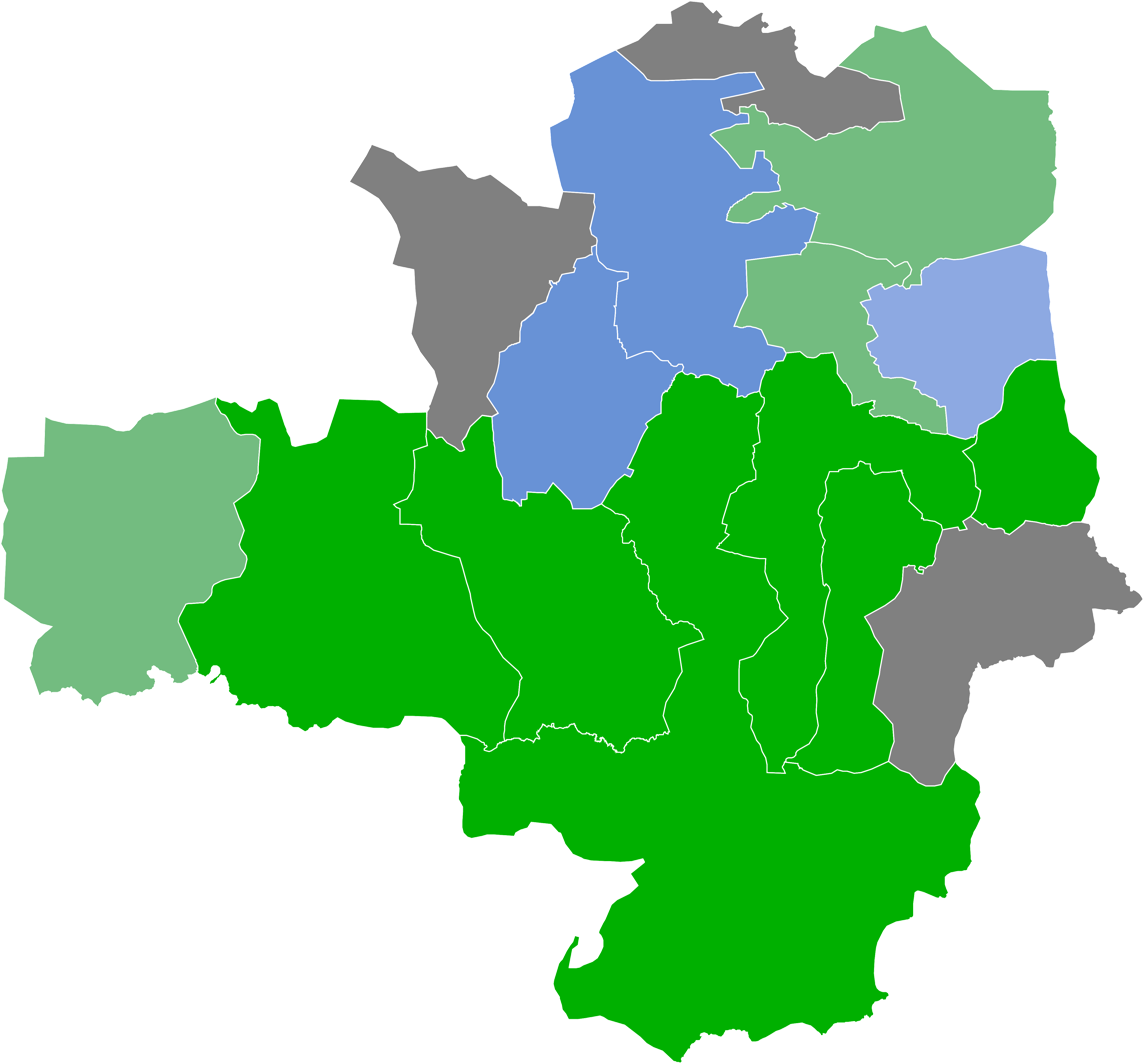
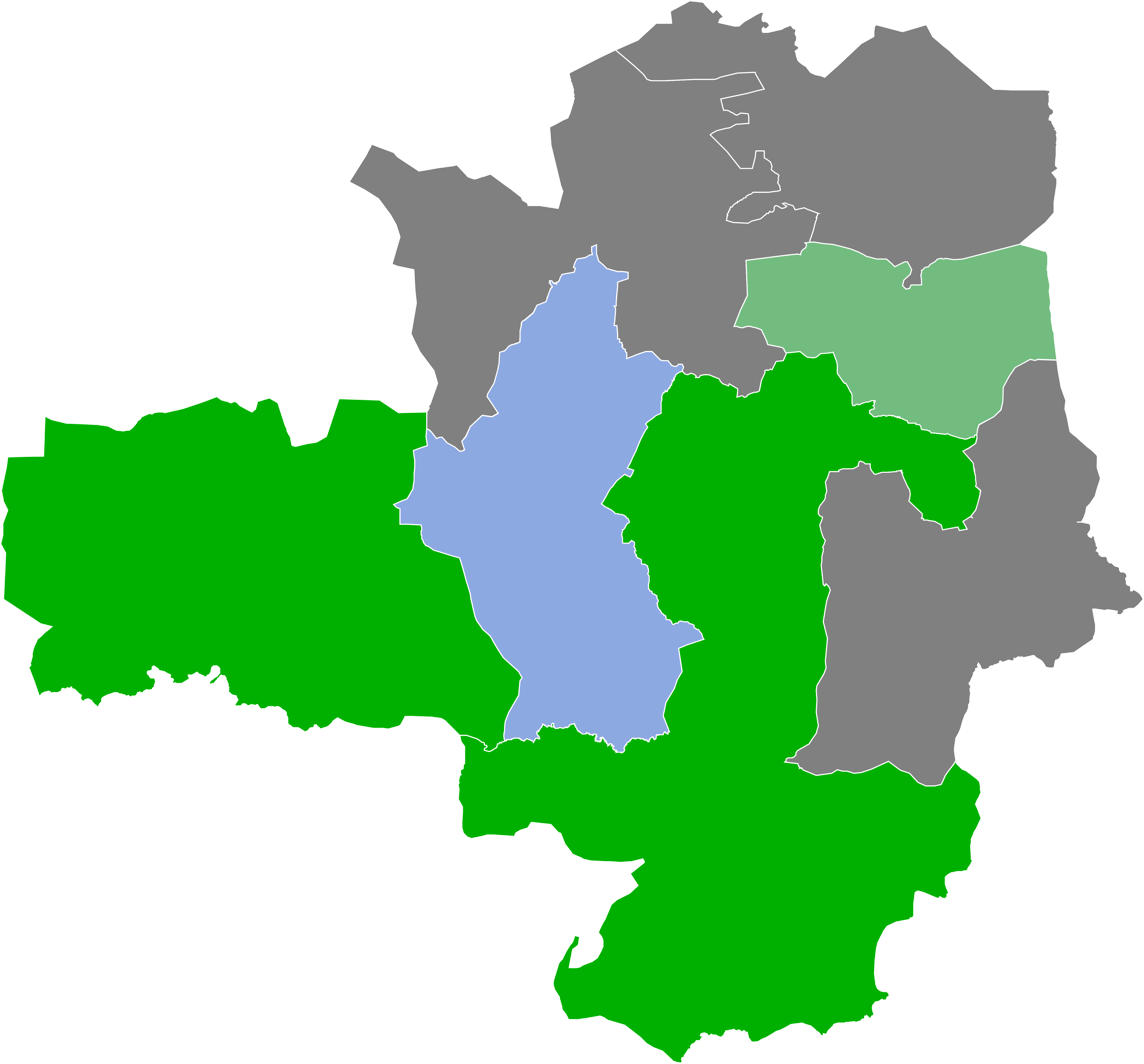
- LGA results Matawalle: 50–60% 60–70% Lawal: 50–60% 60–70% Incomplete results
Governor before election
Bello Matawalle
APC
Elected Governor
Dauda Lawal
PDP

The 2023 Zamfara State gubernatorial election was held on 18 March 2023, to elect the Governor of Zamfara State, concurrent with elections to the Zamfara State House of Assembly as well as twenty-seven other gubernatorial elections and elections to all other state houses of assembly. The election — which was postponed from its original 11 March date — was held three weeks after the presidential election and National Assembly elections. Incumbent All Progressives Congress Governor Bello Matawalle was eligible for re-election but defeated by banker Dauda Lawal — the nominee of the Peoples Democratic Party.

The primaries, scheduled for between 4 April and 9 June 2022, resulted in Matawalle being renominated by the All Progressives Congress unopposed on 26 May while the Peoples Democratic Party nominated banker Dauda Lawal on 25 May. However, Lawal was removed as nominee by a Federal High Court on 16 September due to irregularities in the primary; the PDP conducted a new primary on 23 September that resulted in Lawal winning again. A Federal High Court ruling on 8 November invalidated the rerun primary and barred the party from fielding a nominee but the ruling was overturned by an Appeal Court judgment on 6 January.

On 21 March, Lawal was declared the winner by INEC after results showed him winning roughly 378,000 votes compared to Matawalle's total of nearly 312,000 votes. However, Matawalle rejected the results and commenced a legal battle that initially succeeded as a Court of Appeal judgement in November overturned the result and declared the election inconclusive. However, the Supreme Court upheld the election of Lawal in a January 2024 ruling.

== Electoral system ==
The Governor of Zamfara State is elected using a modified two-round system. To be elected in the first round, a candidate must receive the plurality of the vote and over 25% of the vote in at least two-thirds of state local government areas. If no candidate passes this threshold, a second round will be held between the top candidate and the next candidate to have received a plurality of votes in the highest number of local government areas.

== Background ==
Zamfara State is highly populated northwestern state mainly inhabited by ethnic Hausas and Fulanis. In the years before the election, the state was beset by the bandit conflict along with herder–farmer clashes and the nationwide kidnapping epidemic as bandits raid entire towns, kidnap school children, and attack motorists.

Politically, the 2019 elections were initially a continuation of the state APC's dominance as the party's presidential nominee Muhammadu Buhari won the state by over 50% and the party won all three senate seats while also sweeping the House of Representatives elections. On the state level, the APC also retained its House of Assembly majority and its nominee—Mukhtar Shehu Idris—won the gubernatorial election by a wide margin. However, right before inaugurations, the Supreme Court ruled that the Zamfara APC did not hold valid primaries and thus all of its candidates were disqualified. Matawalle, and every other PDP runner-up, was sworn in and the state was entirely PDP-run until June 2021 when Matawalle led nearly every elected official in the state into the APC.

Ahead of Matawalle's term, the aims were to end banditry while addressing poverty, unemployment, and illiteracy. In terms of his performance, Matawalle was commended for revoking former elected officials' life pensions. However, he was criticized for spending a hundred million naira in public funds on a private university, rising insecurity, hiring over 1700 aides, blaming banditry on "political bandits" without evidence, orchestrating the politically-motivated impeachment of Deputy Governor Mahdi Aliyu Mohammed Gusau, politically-motivated press censorship, and infringements on constitutionally-mandated secularism along with two prominent examples of luxury car purchases for officials—19 cars for commissioners in May 2020 and over 250 cars for traditional leaders in April 2022.

== Primary elections ==
The primaries, along with any potential challenges to primary results, were to take place between 4 April and 3 June 2022 but the deadline was extended to 9 June.

=== All Progressives Congress ===
The internal power-struggle between former Governor Abdul'aziz Abubakar Yari and former Senator Kabir Garba Marafa that led to the disqualification of all 2019 Zamfara APC candidates continued after the election until Matawalle's defection in 2021. As Matawalle suddenly became the preeminent Zamfara APC politician, Yari and Marafa briefly reconciled to face Matawalle together before splitting again ahead of the state party congress in late 2021. Infighting between the groups supported by Matawalle, Marafa, and Yari each culminated in three divided party factions, all claiming to be the legitimate party structure. As Matawalle is a serving governor, his faction was recognized by the national party in February 2022 but the internal struggles continued until a peace was brokered by national APC leadership in May.

On 20 April 2022, the APC National Executive Committee announced the party's schedule for gubernatorial primaries, setting its expression of interest form price at ₦10 million and nomination form price at ₦40 million with a 50% nomination form discount for candidates younger than 40 while women and candidates with disabilities get free nomination forms. Forms were to be sold from 26 April to 6 May until the deadline was later extended to 10 May then 12 May. After the submission of nomination forms by 13 May, candidates were screened by a party committee on 14 and 15 May while 16 May was the date for the screening appeal process. Ward congresses and LGA congresses were set for between 7 and 9 May to elect delegates for the primary. Candidates approved by the screening process advanced to a primary set for 26 May, in concurrence with other APC gubernatorial primaries; challenges to the result could be made the next day.

Ahead of the primary, Abdulmalik Gajam—a youth leader and son of former ambassador Garba Gajam—declared a primary challenge to Matawalle; while analysts noted that Gajam's bid had little chance and was likely just an attempt to raise his own profile, Matawalle's allies continuously attempted to convince Gajam to step down. On the primary date, Gajam finally withdrew leading Matawalle to win the nomination unopposed. In his acceptance speech, Matawalle thanked former Governor Mahmud Shinkafi along with both Yari and Marafa while highlighting party unity.

==== Nominated ====
- Bello Matawalle: Governor (2019–present)
  - Running mate—Hassan Nasiha: Deputy Governor (2022–present) and former Senator for Zamfara Central (2007–2011; 2019–2022)

==== Withdrew ====
- Abdulmalik Gajam: youth leader and son of former ambassador Garba Gajam

==== Results ====
APC primary results
Party	Candidate	Votes	%
APC	Bello Matawalle	733	100.00%
Total votes		733	100.00%
Invalid or blank votes		2	N/A
Turnout		735	100.00%

=== People's Democratic Party ===
In the wake of Matawalle’s defection to the APC, Deputy Governor Mahdi Aliyu Mohammed Gusau swiftly took control of the Zamfara PDP and was named state party leader, even representing Zamfara at PDP Governors Forum meetings. Mohammed Gusau received support from high-profile national PDP figures and fear of his potential gubernatorial run allegedly led to Mohammed Gusau's impeachment in February 2022; however, Mohammed Gusau ended up announcing his run for governor anyway.

On 16 March 2022, the national PDP announced its gubernatorial primaries' schedule, setting its expression of interest form price at ₦1 million and the nomination form price at ₦20 million with a 50% discount for candidates between 25 and 30. Forms were to be sold until 1 April but the party later extended the deadline four times before reaching a final deadline of 22 April. After the submission of nomination forms by 25 April, candidates were screened by a party committee on 28 April while 2 May was the rescheduled date for the screening appeal process. Ward congresses were set for 29 April and LGA congresses were rescheduled for 10 May to elect delegates for the primary. Candidates approved by the screening process advanced to a primary set for 25 May, in concurrence with all other PDP gubernatorial primaries; challenges to the result could be made in the following days.

Ahead of the May primary, reports emerged that Aliyu Mohammed Gusau—former Defence Minister, father of Mahdi, and de facto leader of the Zamfara PDP—along with other Zamfara PDP figures backed banker Dauda Lawal instead of Mahdi or other candidates. On the initial primary date, Mahdi Aliyu Mohammed Gusau abruptly withdrew and endorsed Lawal while the other four candidates continued to an indirect primary that resulted in Lawal's victory after results showed him winning about 98% of the delegates' votes. After announcing the results, primary committee chairman Adamu Maina Waziri labeled the election as fair and thanked the delegates for the peaceful primary. However, the three losing candidates petitioned against Lawal's victory using claims of illegal interference from state party PDP Chairman Bala Mande to appeal to national party chairman Iyorchia Ayu. After Ayu did not act, the losing candidates took their case to the judiciary in an attempt to annul the primary; their case was successful and the primary was annulled on 16 September by a Federal High Court based on electoral irregularities. Within days, the state PDP declined to appeal and instead scheduled a new primary for 23 September; in the days before, the party held its candidate screening exercise and conducted a mini congress to add women to the list of delegates. In the rerun primary, Lawal won again by a similarly wide margin. However, on 8 November, another Federal High Court ruling nullified the rerun primary due to further irregularities and barred the party from fielding a nominee in the gubernatorial election. On November 23, a Court of Appeal panel sitting in Sokoto dismissed Lawal's appeal. However, another appeal was successful in January, reinstated Lawal as the legitimate nominee. The decision was affirmed by the Supreme Court on 6 March in a unanimous panel judgment.

==== Nominated ====
- Dauda Lawal: banker
  - Running mate—Mani Mallam Mummuni

==== Eliminated in primary ====
- Wadatau Madawaki: civil servant
- Ibrahim Shehu Gusau: engineer
- Hafiz Usman Nahuche

==== Withdrew ====
- Mahdi Aliyu Mohammed Gusau: Deputy Governor (2019–2022) and son of former Defence Minister Aliyu Mohammed Gusau

==== Results ====
Annulled primary results
Candidates' vote share
1. Dauda Lawal (97.7%)
2. Other candidates (2.27%)

PDP primary results
Party	Candidate	Votes	%
PDP	Dauda Lawal	431	97.73%
PDP	Ibrahim Shehu Gusau	5	1.13%
PDP	Wadatau Madawaki	3	0.68%
PDP	Hafiz Usman Nahuche	0	0.00%
Total votes		439	100.00%
Invalid or blank votes		2	N/A
Turnout		441	Unknown

PDP rerun primary results
Party	Candidate	Votes	%
PDP	Dauda Lawal	422	99.53%
PDP	Ibrahim Shehu Gusau	1	0.24%
PDP	Hafiz Usman Nahuche	1	0.24%
PDP	Wadatau Madawaki	0	0.00%
Total votes		424	100.00%
Invalid or blank votes		4	N/A
Turnout		428	Unknown

=== Minor parties ===
- Mohammed Giggi (Accord)
  - Running mate: Suleman Bello
- Kabiru Sani (Action Alliance)
  - Running mate: Abubakar Abdulrahman
- Usman Isah (Action Democratic Party)
  - Running mate: Amina Abdullahi
- Zayyanu Salisu (Action Peoples Party)
  - Running mate: Muhammad Bello
- Hashim Ahmad (African Democratic Congress)
  - Running mate: Jafaru Salisu Gusau
- Lawali Usman (All Progressives Grand Alliance)
  - Running mate: Mustapha Danmaliki
- Muhammad Abdulra'uf (Boot Party)
  - Running mate: Bello Nura
- Ahmed Yahuza (Labour Party)
  - Running mate: Umar Danmalan Sule
- Saidu Aliyu Dansadau (National Rescue Movement)
  - Running mate: Saidu Haruna G/Baure
- Sani Washo (Social Democratic Party)
  - Running mate: Rufai Lawali
- Sani Umar (Young Progressives Party)
  - Running mate: Abubakar Gandi
- Hadiza Usman (Zenith Labour Party)
  - Running mate: Sani Yusuf

== Campaign ==
Early in the post-primary period, pundits noted that the race followed the trend of Zamfara elections being categorized by defections and ad hoc alliances. Matawalle's defection to the APC in June 2021 and the May 2022 deal with former Governor Abdul'aziz Abubakar Yari and former Senator Kabir Garba Marafa created a deep contrast for the 2023 election compared to the 2019 election when Matawalle was in the PDP up against the APC split between Yari and Marafa. Analysts also noted continued defections between parties as several APC politicians unhappy with the Matawalle-Yari-Marafa deal joined the PDP while some PDP party officials left to the NNPP. These dynamics took a backseat to internal PDP drama by September, when a case from losing primary aspirants led a High Court to annul the PDP primary and order the party to conduct a new primary. Despite the intra-party crisis, Lawal was nominated again on 23 September.

The next month, national attention turned to the race due to controversy as Matawalle ordered the shutdown of several television and radio stations on 15 October in retaliation after the stations had covered a Lawal campaign event. The action was widely condemned by press freedom organizations which labeled the action as a clear violation of the freedom of the press and overall rule of law. Amid the controversy was a violent clash between APC and PDP supporters in Gusau that left one dead and 18 wounded; both major parties traded blame for the tragedy and it raised fears of further electoral violence. The fears were unfortunately confirmed the next week when police opened fire on PDP demonstrators on 20 October, allegedly on the orders of Matawalle.

In November, focus returned to legal complications for Lawal as another High Court ruling annulled the rerun primary along with barring the PDP from fielding a nominee in the election. Internal PDP opponents of Lawal blamed him for the party's disqualification while Lawal implored his supporters to remain calm and said that he would appeal the judgment. Although his initial appeal was dismissed, a later appeal was successful and Lawal was reinstated as PDP nominee in early January 2023. Amid Lawal's legal struggles, Matawalle faced similar legal problems but related to corruption allegations; the Economic and Financial Crimes Commission presented a Federal High Court in October 2022 with evidence that Matawalle used stolen public funds to personally purchase Abuja properties. The revelations, in addition to previous corruption allegations and new reporting that large amounts of cash had been found in a Matawalle-owned house, tarnished Matawalle's image in the later months of 2022.

In the week prior to the presidential election on 25 February, the Matawalle administration issued a ban on non-governmental organizations operating in the state; once again, the state government came under intense criticism that labeled the move as authoritarian. Later in February, the state voted in the presidential election; Bola Tinubu (APC) won the state with 59% of the vote, beating Atiku Abubakar (PDP) at 39%. Despite the presidential result, gubernatorial campaign analysis noted the competitiveness of the race with a focus on Matawalle's support among notable state political figures along with Lawal's support among voters pushing for a power shift to the central senatorial district. Additionally, Lawal's urban base in cities like Gusau was contrasted with Matawalle's rural support.

== Projections ==
Source	Projection	As of
Africa Elects (Note: AfricaElects projections predict the likelihood of a candidate winning a state by categorizing a state as "Safe" for exceedingly likely, "Likely" for somewhat likely, and "Lean" for least likely. If no clear determination could be made, states are categorized as "tossups".)	Lean Matawalle	17 March 2023
Enough is Enough- SBM Intelligence (Note: EiE-SBM projections predict which candidates will win states.)	Matawalle	2 March 2023

== Conduct ==
=== Electoral timetable ===
On 26 February 2022, the Independent National Electoral Commission released the timetable, setting out key dates and deadlines for the election. Months later on 27 May 2022, INEC made a slight revision to the timetable, allowing parties extra time to conduct primaries.

- 28 February 2022 – Publication of Notice of Election
- 4 April 2022 – First day for the conduct of party primaries
- 9 June 2022 (Note: The original deadline was 3 June; however, INEC pushed it back to 9 June at the behest of parties.) – Final day for the conduct of party primaries, including the resolution of disputes arising from them
- 1 July 2022 – First day for submission of nomination forms to INEC via the online portal
- 15 July 2022 – Final day for submission of nomination forms to INEC via the online portal
- 12 October 2022 – Commencement of the official campaign period
- 16 March 2023 (Note: The original deadline was 9 March; however, INEC pushed it back to 16 March.) – Final day of the official campaign period

=== Pre-election ===
Due to widespread insecurity in the state, civil society groups raised concern about the safe conduct of the election in heavily-insecure areas.

== General election ==
=== Results ===
2023 Zamfara State gubernatorial election
Party	Candidate	Votes	%
A	Mohammed Giggi		
AA	Kabiru Sani		
ADP	Usman Isah		
APP	Zayyanu Salisu		
ADC	Hashim Ahmad		
APM	Lawali Usman		
APC	Bello Matawalle		
BP	Muhammad Abdulra'uf		
LP	Ahmed Yahuza		
New Nigeria Peoples Party	Saidu Aliyu Dansadau		
PDP	Dauda Lawal		
SDP	Sani Washo		
YPP	Sani Umar		
ZLP	Hadiza Usman		
Total votes			100.00%
Invalid or blank votes			N/A
Turnout			

==== By senatorial district ====
The results of the election by senatorial district.

Senatorial District	Bello Matawalle APC		Dauda Lawal PDP		Others		Total Valid Votes
Senatorial District	Votes	Percentage	Votes	Percentage	Votes	Percentage	Total Valid Votes
Zamfara Central Senatorial District (Note: Comprising the local government areas of Bungudu, Gusau, Maru, and Tsafe.)	93,488	%	176,398	%	N/A	%	N/A
Zamfara North Senatorial District (Note: Comprising the local government areas of Birnin Magaji/Kiyaw, Kaura Namoda, Shinkafi, Talata Mafara, and Zurmi.)	111,830	%	100,226	%	N/A	%	N/A
Zamfara West Senatorial District (Note: Comprising the local government areas of Anka, Bakura, Bukkuyum, Gummi, Mafara and Maradun.)	106,658	%	101,102	%	N/A	%	N/A
Totals	377,726	%	311,976	%	N/A	%	N/A

==== By federal constituency ====
The results of the election by federal constituency.

Federal Constituency	Bello Matawalle APC		Dauda Lawal PDP		Others		Total Valid Votes
Federal Constituency	Votes	Percentage	Votes	Percentage	Votes	Percentage	Total Valid Votes
Anka/Talata/Mafara Federal Constituency (Note: Comprising the local government areas of Anka and Talata Mafara.)	51,436	55.74%	39,352	42.64%	1,491	1.62%	92,279
Bakura/Maradun Federal Constituency (Note: Comprising the local government areas of Bakura and Maradun.)	65,918	%	31,716	%	N/A	%	N/A
Bungudu/Maru Federal Constituency (Note: Comprising the local government areas of Bungudu and Maru.)	35,511	32.63%	69,500	63.86%	3,823	3.51%	108,834
Gunmi/Bukkuyum Federal Constituency (Note: Comprising the local government areas of Gummi and Bukkuyum.)	30,584	36.70%	52,270	62.72%	483	0.58%	83,337
Gusau/Tsafe Federal Constituency (Note: Comprising the local government areas of Gusau and Tsafe.)	57,977	%	106,898	%	N/A	%	N/A
Kaura Namoda/Birnin Magaji Federal Constituency (Note: Comprising the local government areas of Birnin Magaji/Kiyaw and Kaura Namoda.)	36,115	46.78%	40,227	52.11%	859	1.11%	77,201
Shinkafi/Zurmi Federal Constituency (Note: Comprising the local government areas of Shinkafi and Zurmi.)	34,435	%	37,763	%	N/A	%	N/A
Totals	377,726	%	311,976	%	N/A	%	N/A

==== By local government area ====
The results of the election by local government area.

LGA	Bello Matawalle APC		Dauda Lawal PDP		Others		Total Valid Votes	Turnout Percentage
LGA	Votes	Percentage	Votes	Percentage	Votes	Percentage	Total Valid Votes	Turnout Percentage
Anka	10,156	36.43%	17,116	61.40%	190	0.68%	27,462	33.92%
Bakura	41,063	%	19,455	%	N/A	%	N/A	54.91%
Birnin Magaji/Kiyaw	9,643	51.17%	8,991	47.71%	212	1.12%	18,846	19.01%
Bukkuyum	10,321	29.54%	24,341	69.66%	281	0.80%	34,943	37.22%
Bungudu	24,865	32.61%	47,464	62.26%	1,661	2.24%	73,990	41.44%
Gummi	20,263	41.87%	27,929	57.71%	202	0.42%	48,394	40.21%
Gusau	32,172	32.83%	64,710	66.03%	1,121	1.14%	98,003	34.10%
Kaura Namoda	26,472	45.36%	31,236	53.53%	647	1.11%	58,355	40.86%
Maradun	24,855	66.64%	12,261	32.87%	181	0.49%	37,297	36.67%
Maru	10,646	31.85%	22,036	65.93%	2,162	6.47%	33,421	29.55%
Shinkafi	13,408	%	13,435	%	N/A	%	N/A	30.29%
Talata Mafara	41,280	63.69%	22,236	34.31%	1,301	2.01%	64,817	44.71%
Tsafe	25,805	%	42,188	%	N/A	%	N/A	%
Zurmi	21,027	46.04%	24,328	53.27%	314	0.69%	45,669	36.10%
Totals	377,726	%	311,976	%	N/A	%	N/A	%

== See also ==
- 2023 Nigerian elections
- 2023 Nigerian gubernatorial elections
