= 2019 Zamfara State gubernatorial election =

2019 gubernatorial election in Zamfara State, Nigeria

- (Nigeria)
- 9 March 2019
- Turnout: 47.22%
Nominee	Bello Matawalle (Declared winner)	Mukhtar Shehu Idris (Disqualified)
Party	PDP	APC
Running mate	Mahdi Mohammed Gusau
Popular vote	189,452	534,541 (Declared Wasted Votes)
Percentage	23.89%	67.41%
Governor before election
Abdul'aziz Abubakar Yari
APC
Elected Governor
Bello Matawalle
APC

The 2019 Zamfara State gubernatorial election occurred on 9 March 2019. APC's Mukhtar Shehu Idris polled 67.41% of the total popular votes, defeating PDP's Bello Matawalle who got 23.89% of the total votes and trailed behind by a margin of 345,089 votes, and several minor party candidates. APC swept the entire 14 LGAs of the state, winning in all. It was, however, Matawalle, who was later declared winner by the INEC and sworn in as governor after the verdict of the Supreme Court, which declared Idris' votes as 'wasted'.

Idris was announced winner at the gubernatorial primary, to avoid reaching INEC's deadline after a parallel election was organised by the out-going governor.

Bello Matawalle emerged winner in the PDP gubernatorial primary election. His running mate was Mahdi Mohammed Gusau.

Of the 42 candidates who aspired for the governorship seat, 40 were male, two were female.

== Electoral system ==
The Governor of Zamfara State is elected using the plurality voting system.

== Primary election ==
=== PDP primary ===
The PDP primary election was held from Sunday, September 30, until the early morning hours of Monday, October 1, 2018. About 1,500 accredited delegates were present from the - LGAs of the state. Bello Matawalle emerged winner with 1,426 (98.25%) delegate votes after his only opponent, Sahabi Ya'u, was 'made to step down' for him.

=== Candidates ===
- Party nominee: Bello Mohammed Matawalle: Winner.
- Running mate: Mahdi Bello Gusau.
- Sahabi Ya'u (Stepped down)

=== APC primary ===
The APC primary elections in Zamfara State could not be held before the deadline set by the INEC, leading the disqualification of all APC candidates. The election was earlier scheduled for Sunday, September 30, but postponed to Monday, October 1, 2018. The rescheduled election was finally held on Wednesday, October 3, 2018, but then cancelled by the party's National Working Committee (NWC) due to the violence that marred the process. The party, however, announced Mukhtar Shehu Idris as winner of the parallel election organized by the incumbent governor, Abdul'aziz Abubakar Yari, on Sunday, October 7, 2018, in which Idris was said to have polled 310,380 votes, closely followed by Senator Kabiru Marafa with 54,607 votes. Other were Alh. Mahmuda Aliyu Shinkafi with 5,514 votes, Alh. Ibrahim Wakkala Muhammad 517 votes, Alh. Sagir Hamidu Gusau 102 votes, Alh. Aminu Sani Jaji 12,039 votes, Alh. Abu Magaji 340 votes, Alh. Dauda Lawal Dare 5,396 votes and Brig. Gen. Mansur Dan Ali (rtd.) with 292 votes, as announced by the state party chairman, Alh. Lawali M. Liman. This was to meet the Sunday, October 7, 2018, INEC deadline for all political parties to conclude their primary elections. Nevertheless, even with this result, the INEC insisted the party had no candidate in the state, and barred the party from fielding candidates in the upcoming election in the state. The party thereafter sought using judicial alternative to legalize its candidate at a law court, after which INEC agreed for the party to field candidates for the elections.

=== Candidates ===
- Party nominee: Mukhtar Shehu Idris.
- Running mate: .
- Kabiru Marafa: 54,607 votes.
- Aminu Sani Jaji: 12,039 votes.
- Mahmuda Aliyu Shinkafi: 5,514 votes.
- Dauda Lawal Dare: 5,396 votes.
- Ibrahim Wakkala Muhammad: 517 votes.
- Abu Magaji: 340 votes.
- Mansur Dan Ali: 292 votes.
- Sagir Hamidu Gusau: 102 votes.

== Results ==
A total of 42 candidates registered with the Independent National Electoral Commission to contest in the election. APC candidate, Idris Shehu, won election by polling 534,541 votes, defeating APC's Bello Matawalle who came second with 189,452 votes. However, internal party crisis threatened APC's chance to continue governing the state.

The total number of registered voters in the state was 1,717,128 while 823,294 voters were accredited. Total number of votes cast was 810,782, while total number of valid votes was 792,938. Total rejected votes were 17,844.

Candidate	Party	Votes	%
Mukhtar Shehu Idris	All Progressives Congress (APC)	534,541	67.41
Bello Matawalle	People's Democratic Party (PDP)	189,452	23.89
Bala Bello Maru	Accord (A)	43,691	5.51
Saidu Mohammed Dansadau	National Rescue Movement (NRM)	15,177	1.91
Sani Abdullahi Shinkafi	All Progressives Grand Alliance (APGA)	3,865	0.49
Takori Mohammed Sani	Advanced Peoples Democratic Alliance (APDA)	807	0.10
Sule Garba	Progressive Peoples Alliance (PPA)	695	0.09
Bashir Yusuf Sani	All Grand Alliance Party (AGAP)	577	0.07
Iliyasu Sulaiman	Democratic Alternative (DA)	546	0.07
Haruna Aminu	Advanced Congress of Democrats (ACD)	402	0.05
Badamasi Bello	African Democratic Congress (ADC)	344	0.04
Umar Mande	Masses Movement of Nigeria (MMN)	292	0.04
Aminu Mainasara	Democratic People's Party (DPP)	263	0.03
Zayyanu Salisu (Haske)	All People's Party (APP)	191	0.02
Bashiru Adamu Gusau	People's Party of Nigeria (PPN)	168	0.02
Shehu Mus Maigoroa	Mega Party of Nigeria (MPN)	163	0.02
Yusuf Mustapha	All Blending Party (ABP)	135	0.02
Sani Yusuf	Green Party of Nigeria (GPN)	127	0.02
Garba Ali	Better Nigeria Progressive Party (BNPP)	119	0.02
Kabiru Yahaya Mohammed	Social Democratic Party (SDP)	108	0.01
Musa Yahaya	Young Progressive Party (YPP)	103	0.01
Bala Aliyu Gusau	People's Redemption Party (PRP)	102	0.01
Abulmajid Shehu	Action Democratic Party (ADP)	100	0.01
Kamilu Musa	Alliance for Democracy (AD)	99	0.01
Abala Debora	Sustainable National Party (SNP)	88	0.01
Muhammed Nura	Coalition for Change (C4C)	87	0.01
Kabiru Iliyasu A. Gusau	Democratic People's Congress (DPC)	77	0.01
Dadi Abdullahi O.	People for Democratic Change (PDC)	70	0.01
Lawali Ibrahim	Allied Congress Party of Nigeria (ACPN)	63	0.01
Mustapha Muhammed	Re-build Nigeria Party (RBNP)	57	0.01
Umar Sani	Nigeria Elements Progressive Party (NEPP)	48	0.01
Aminu Ab Muazu	United Progressive Party (UPP)	43	0.01
Dahiru Aliyu Gusau	Change Advocacy Party (CAP)	42	0.01
Sani Umar	Restoration Party of Nigeria (RP)	41	0.01
Abba Sani A.	Unity Party of Nigeria (UPN)	41	0.01
Sani Abdullahi	Labour Party (LP)	38	0.00
Mohammed Bala	National Conscience Party (NCP)	38	0.00
Kucheri Shehu Hussaini	Hope Democratic Party (HDP)	36	0.00
Hamisu Yahuza	Justice Must Prevail Party (JMPP)	34	0.00
Kabiru Garbba	Nigeria Community Movement Party (NCMP)	28	0.00
Usman Hadiza Usman	Zenith Labour Party (ZLP)	25	0.00
Mansur Saleh Maigwanjo	We The People Nigeria (WTPN)	15	0.00
Total		792,938	100.00
Valid votes		792,938	97.80
Invalid/blank votes		17,844	2.20
Total votes		810,782	100.00
Registered voters/turnout		1,717,128	47.22
Source: INEC

=== By local government area ===
Here are the results of the election from the local government areas of the state for the two major parties. The total valid votes of 792,913 represents the 42 political parties that participated in the election. Green represents LGAs won by Matawalle. Blue represents LGAs won by Idris.

County (LGA)	Bello Mutawalle PDP		Mukhtar Shehu Idris APC (Reversed Accredited Votes)		Total votes
County (LGA)	#	%	#	%	#
Anka	8,292	77%	10,743		
Bakura	15,331	87%	17,540		
Birnin Magaji	7,880	79%	9,974		
Bukkuyum	12,010	74%	16,216		
Bungudu	18,379	56%	32,892		
Gummi	13,418	78%	17,198		
Gusau	22,441	60%	37,269		
Kaura Namoda	14,647	79%	18,439		
Maradun	18,868	88%	21,477		
Maru	9,830	39%	25,325		
Shinkafi	5,707	60%	9,577		
Talata Mafara	12,691	71%	17,875		
Tsafe	16,764	38%	34,747		
Zurmi	13,194	68%	19,431		
Totals					-
