= 2023 Nigerian presidential election in Zamfara State =

- 25 February 2023
- Registered: 1,926,870
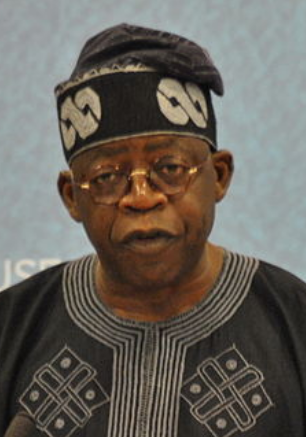

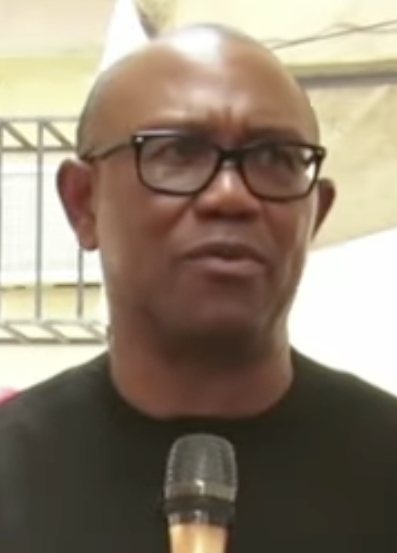

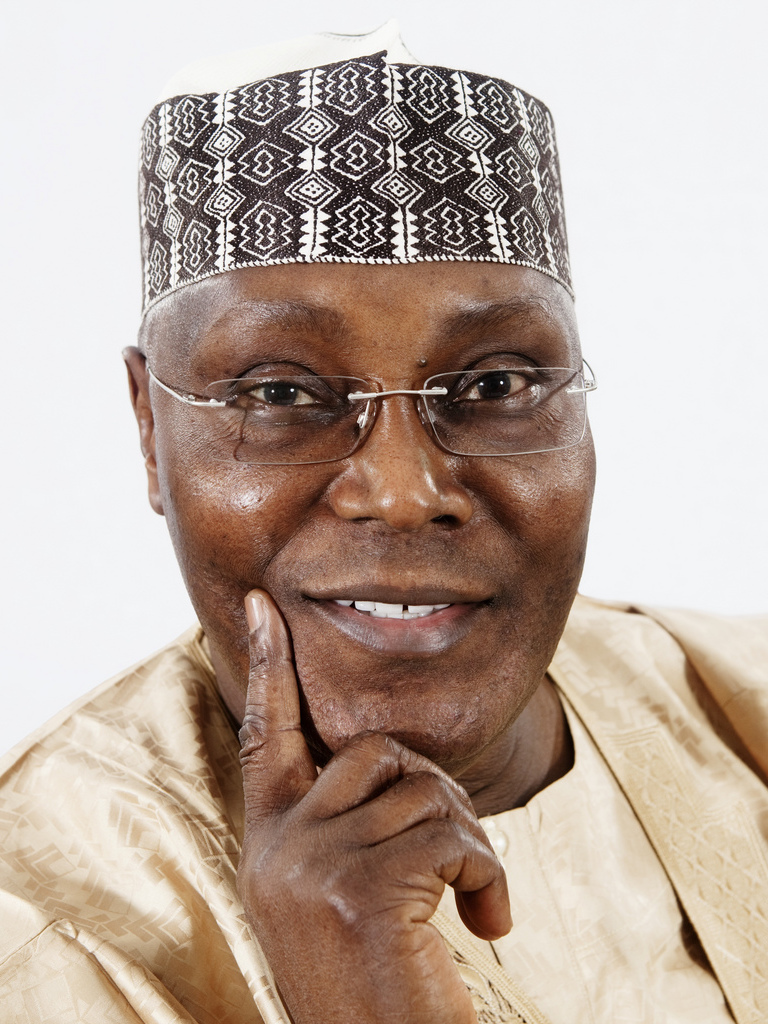
Nominee	Bola Tinubu	Peter Obi
Party	APC	LP
Home state	Lagos	Anambra
Running mate	Kashim Shettima	Yusuf Datti Baba-Ahmed
Nominee	Rabiu Kwankwaso	Atiku Abubakar
Party	New Nigeria Peoples Party	PDP
Home state	Kano	Adamawa
Running mate	Isaac Idahosa	Ifeanyi Okowa
President before election
Muhammadu Buhari
APC
Elected President
TBD

The 2023 Nigerian presidential election in Zamfara State will be held on 25 February 2023 as part of the nationwide 2023 Nigerian presidential election to elect the president and vice president of Nigeria. Other federal elections, including elections to the House of Representatives and the Senate, will also be held on the same date while state elections will be held two weeks afterward on 11 March.

== Background ==
Zamfara State is highly populated northwestern state mainly inhabited by ethnic Hausas and Fulanis. In the years before the election, the state was beset by the bandit conflict along with herder–farmer clashes and the nationwide kidnapping epidemic as bandits raid entire towns, kidnap school children, and attack motorists.

Politically, the 2019 elections were initially a continuation of the state APC's dominance as the party's presidential nominee Muhammadu Buhari won the state by over 50% and the party won all three senate seats while also sweeping the House of Representatives elections. On the state level, the APC also retained its House of Assembly majority and its gubernatorial nominee—Mukhtar Shehu Idris—won the gubernatorial election by a wide margin. However, right before inaugurations, the Supreme Court ruled that the Zamfara APC did not hold valid primaries and thus all of its candidates—other than Buhari, who was nominated nationally—were disqualified.

== Polling ==
Polling organisation/client	Fieldwork date	Sample size					Others	Undecided	Undisclosed	Not voting
Polling organisation/client	Fieldwork date	Sample size	Tinubu APC	Obi LP	Kwankwaso NNPP	Abubakar PDP	Others	Undecided	Undisclosed	Not voting
Nextier (Zamfara crosstabs of national poll)	27 January 2023	N/A	55.1%	1.4%	4.3%	39.1%	–	–	–	–
SBM Intelligence for EiE (Zamfara crosstabs of national poll)	22 January-6 February 2023	N/A	37%	25%	5%	28%	–	5%	–	–

== Projections ==
Source	Projection		As of
Africa Elects (Note: Africa Elects projections predict the likelihood of a candidate winning a state by categorizing a state as "Safe" for exceedingly likely, "Likely" for somewhat likely, and "Lean" for least likely. If no clear determination could be made, states are categorized as "tossups".)	Lean Tinubu		24 February 2023
Dataphyte (Note: Dataphyte projections predict candidates' projected votal shares in each state.)
Dataphyte	Tinubu:	43.30%	11 February 2023
Dataphyte	Obi:	7.51%	11 February 2023
Dataphyte	Abubakar:	43.30%	11 February 2023
Dataphyte	Others:	5.69%	11 February 2023
Enough is Enough- SBM Intelligence (Note: EiE-SBM projections predict which candidates will win states.)	Tinubu		17 February 2023
SBM Intelligence (Note: SBM projections predict which candidates will win states or, if no determination could be made, categorizes states as "Too close to call" (TCC).)	Tinubu		15 December 2022
ThisDay (Note: ThisDay projections predict candidates' projected votal shares in each state.)
ThisDay	Tinubu:	35%	27 December 2022
ThisDay	Obi:	–	27 December 2022
ThisDay	Kwankwaso:	20%	27 December 2022
ThisDay	Abubakar:	35%	27 December 2022
ThisDay	Others/Undecided:	10%	27 December 2022
The Nation (Note: The Nation projections predict which candidates will win states or, if no determination could be made, categorizes states as "Battlegrounds.")	Tinubu		12-19 February 2023

== General election ==
=== Results ===
2023 Nigerian presidential election in Zamfara State
Party	Candidate	Votes	%
A	Christopher Imumolen		
AA	Hamza al-Mustapha		
ADP	Yabagi Sani		
APP	Osita Nnadi		
AAC	Omoyele Sowore		
ADC	Dumebi Kachikwu		
APC	Bola Tinubu		
APGA	Peter Umeadi		
APM	Princess Chichi Ojei		
BP	Sunday Adenuga		
LP	Peter Obi		
NRM	Felix Johnson Osakwe		
New Nigeria Peoples Party	Rabiu Kwankwaso		
PRP	Kola Abiola		
PDP	Atiku Abubakar		
SDP	Adewole Adebayo		
YPP	Malik Ado-Ibrahim		
ZLP	Dan Nwanyanwu		
Total votes			100.00%
Invalid or blank votes			N/A
Turnout			

==== By senatorial district ====
The results of the election by senatorial district.

Senatorial District	Bola Tinubu APC		Atiku Abubakar PDP		Peter Obi LP		Rabiu Kwankwaso NNPP		Others		Total valid votes
Senatorial District	Votes	%	Votes	%	Votes	%	Votes	%	Votes	%	Total valid votes
Zamfara Central Senatorial District (Note: Comprising the local government areas of Bungudu, Gusau, Maru, and Tsafe.)	TBD	%	TBD	%	TBD	%	TBD	%	TBD	%	TBD
Zamfara North Senatorial District (Note: Comprising the local government areas of Birnin Magaji/Kiyaw, Kaura Namoda, Shinkafi, Talata Mafara, and Zurmi.)	TBD	%	TBD	%	TBD	%	TBD	%	TBD	%	TBD
Zamfara West Senatorial District (Note: Comprising the local government areas of Anka, Bakura, Bukkuyum, Gummi, and Maradun.)	TBD	%	TBD	%	TBD	%	TBD	%	TBD	%	TBD
Totals	TBD	%	TBD	%	TBD	%	TBD	%	TBD	%	TBD

==== By federal constituency ====
The results of the election by federal constituency.

Federal Constituency	Bola Tinubu APC		Atiku Abubakar PDP		Peter Obi LP		Rabiu Kwankwaso NNPP		Others		Total valid votes
Federal Constituency	Votes	%	Votes	%	Votes	%	Votes	%	Votes	%	Total valid votes
Anka/Talata/Mafara Federal Constituency (Note: Comprising the local government areas of Anka and Talata Mafara.)	TBD	%	TBD	%	TBD	%	TBD	%	TBD	%	TBD
Bakura/Maradun Federal Constituency (Note: Comprising the local government areas of Bakura and Maradun.)	TBD	%	TBD	%	TBD	%	TBD	%	TBD	%	TBD
Bungudu/Maru Federal Constituency (Note: Comprising the local government areas of Bungudu and Maru.)	TBD	%	TBD	%	TBD	%	TBD	%	TBD	%	TBD
Gunmi/Bukkuyum Federal Constituency (Note: Comprising the local government areas of Gummi and Bukkuyum.)	TBD	%	TBD	%	TBD	%	TBD	%	TBD	%	TBD
Gusau/Tsafe Federal Constituency (Note: Comprising the local government areas of Gusau and Tsafe.)	TBD	%	TBD	%	TBD	%	TBD	%	TBD	%	TBD
Kaura Namoda/Birnin Magaji Federal Constituency (Note: Comprising the local government areas of Birnin Magaji/Kiyaw and Kaura Namoda.)	TBD	%	TBD	%	TBD	%	TBD	%	TBD	%	TBD
Shinkafi/Zurmi Federal Constituency (Note: Comprising the local government areas of Shinkafi and Zurmi.)	TBD	%	TBD	%	TBD	%	TBD	%	TBD	%	TBD
Totals	TBD	%	TBD	%	TBD	%	TBD	%	TBD	%	TBD

==== By local government area ====
The results of the election by local government area.

Local government area	Bola Tinubu APC		Atiku Abubakar PDP		Peter Obi LP		Rabiu Kwankwaso NNPP		Others		Total valid votes	Turnout (%)
Local government area	Votes	%	Votes	%	Votes	%	Votes	%	Votes	%	Total valid votes	Turnout (%)
Anka	TBD	%	TBD	%	TBD	%	TBD	%	TBD	%	TBD	%
Bakura	TBD	%	TBD	%	TBD	%	TBD	%	TBD	%	TBD	%
Birnin Magaji/Kiyaw	TBD	%	TBD	%	TBD	%	TBD	%	TBD	%	TBD	%
Bukkuyum	TBD	%	TBD	%	TBD	%	TBD	%	TBD	%	TBD	%
Bungudu	TBD	%	TBD	%	TBD	%	TBD	%	TBD	%	TBD	%
Gummi	TBD	%	TBD	%	TBD	%	TBD	%	TBD	%	TBD	%
Gusau	TBD	%	TBD	%	TBD	%	TBD	%	TBD	%	TBD	%
Kaura Namoda	TBD	%	TBD	%	TBD	%	TBD	%	TBD	%	TBD	%
Maradun	TBD	%	TBD	%	TBD	%	TBD	%	TBD	%	TBD	%
Maru	TBD	%	TBD	%	TBD	%	TBD	%	TBD	%	TBD	%
Shinkafi	TBD	%	TBD	%	TBD	%	TBD	%	TBD	%	TBD	%
Talata Mafara	TBD	%	TBD	%	TBD	%	TBD	%	TBD	%	TBD	%
Tsafe	TBD	%	TBD	%	TBD	%	TBD	%	TBD	%	TBD	%
Zurmi	TBD	%	TBD	%	TBD	%	TBD	%	TBD	%	TBD	%
Totals	TBD	%	TBD	%	TBD	%	TBD	%	TBD	%	TBD	%

== See also ==
- 2023 Nigerian elections
- 2023 Nigerian presidential election
