= Nigerian National Assembly delegation from Zamfara =

Zamfara's delegation in Nigeria's National Assembly

The Nigerian National Assembly delegation from Zamfara comprises three Senators representing Zamfara West, Zamfara Central, and Zamfara North, and seven Representatives representing Bakura/Maradun, Gummi/Bukkuyum, Bungudu/Maru, Kaura Namoda/Birnin Magaji, Tsafe/Gusau, Zurmi/Shinkafi, and Anka/Mafara.

== Fourth Republic ==
=== 9th Assembly (2019–2023) ===
Senator	Party	Constituency
Lawali Hassan Anka	PDP	Zamfara West
Hassan Muhammed Gusau	PDP	Zamfara Central
Sahabi Alhaji Yau	PDP	Zamfara North
Representative	Party	Constituency
Kabiru Yahaya	PDP	Anka/Talata Marafa
Ahmed Shehu	PDP	Bungudu/Maru
Bello Shinkafi Hassan	PDP	Shinkafi/Zurmi
Ahmed Bakura Muhammad	PDP	Bakura/Maradun
Umar Sani Dan galadima	PDP	Kaura-Namoda/Birnin-Magaji
Kabiru Amadu	PDP	Gusau/Tsafe
Sulaiman Gumi Abubakar	PDP	Gummi/Bukkuyum

=== 6th Assembly (2007–2015) ===
Senator	Party	Constituency
Ahmad Rufai Sani	ANPP	Zamfara West
Hassan Muhammed Gusau	ANPP	Zamfara Central
Sahabi Alhaji Yaú	ANPP	Zamfara North
Representative	Party	Constituency
Abdullaziz Yari Abubakar	ANPP	Anka/Talata Marafa
Abubakar Shehu Bunu	ANPP	Bungudu/Maru
Bello Abubakar	ANPP	Shinkafi/Zurmi
Bello Mutawalle Maradun	ANPP	Bakura/Maradun
Dahiru Zubairu	ANPP	Kaura-Namoda/Birnin-Magaji
Idris Mohammed Keta	ANPP	Gusau/Tsafe
Mohammed Sani	ANPP	Gummi/Bukkuyum

=== 4th Assembly (1999–2003) ===
Senator	Party	Constituency
Anka Yushau Mohammed	ANPP	Zamfara West
Dansadan Saidu Muhammed	ANPP	Zamfara Central
Lawali Shuaibu	ANPP	Zamfara North
Representative	Party	Constituency
Abubakar Makwashi	ANPP	Bakura/Maradun
Aliyu Sahabi	ANPP	Gummi/Bukkuyum
Doruwa Sani Ibrahim R.	ANPP	Bungudu/Maru
Godal Lawali Ibrahim Nasarawa	ANPP	Kaura Namoda/Birnin Magaji
Mohammed Sani	ANPP	Tsafe/Gusau
Moriki Bello Abubakar	ANPP	Zurmi/Shinkafi
Sani Anka Mohammed	PDP	Anka/Mafara
