= 2019 Zamfara State House of Assembly election =

The 2019 Zamfara State House of Assembly election was held on 9 March 2019, to elect members of the Zamfara State House of Assembly in Nigeria. All the 24 seats were up for election in the Zamfara State House of Assembly.

== Results ==
The result of the election is listed below.

- Lawan Liman from APC won Kaura Namoda North constituency
- Abubakar Kaura from APC won Kaura Namoda South constituency
- Kabiru Moyi from APC won Birnin Magaji constituency
- Yusif Moriki from APC won Zurmi East constituency
- Mannir Aliyu from APC won Zurmi West constituency
- Shehu Maiwurno from APC won Shinkafi constituency
- Aliyu Abubakar from APC won Tsafe East constituency
- Aminu Danjibua from APC won Tsafe West constituency
- Dalhatu Magami from APC won Gusau East constituency
- Sanusi Liman from APC won Gusau West constituency
- Ibrahim Hassan from APC won Bungudu East constituency
- Yakubu Bature from APC won Bungudu West constituency
- Ibrahim Habu from APC won Maru North constituency
- Haruna Abdullahi from APC won Maru South constituency
- Mustapha Gado from APC won Anka constituency
- Isah Abdulmumini from APC won Talata Mafara North constituency
- Aliyu Kagara from APC won Talata Mafara South constituency
- Mohammed Sani from APC won Bakura constituency
- Yahaya Shehu from APC won Maradun constituency
- Yahaya Abdullahi from APC won Maradun constituency
- Aliyu Gayari from APC won Gummi constituency
- Aminu Falale from APC won Gummi constituency
- Yahaya Jibrin from APC won Bukkuyum North constituency
- Tukur Dantawasa from APC won Bukkuyum South constituency
