= Ahmad Sani Muhammad =

Nigerian politician (born 1975)

Member of House of Representatives
- In office 2023–Incumbent
- Constituency: Bakura/Maradun Federal Constituency

Personal details
- Born: 26 October 1975 (age 50)
- Party: All Progressives Congress
- Occupation: Politician

Ahmad Sani Muhammad (born 26 October 1975) is a Nigerian politician currently serving his first term in the House of Representatives, representing the Bakura/Maradun Federal Constituency in Zamfara State.

== Early life and political career ==
Muhammad is the son of Ahmad Sani Yerima, the first civilian governor of Zamfara State, Nigeria.

He was elected in 2023 to the House of Representatives as a member of the All Progressives Congress (APC).
