= Abubakar Makwashi =

Nigerian politician

Member of the House of Representatives
- In office 1999–2003
- Constituency: Bakura/Maradun

Personal details
- Born: 12 June 1946 (age 79) Zamfara State, Nigeria
- Occupation: Politician

Abubakar Makwashi is a Nigerian politician from Zamfara State, Nigeria. He was born on 12 June 1946 in Zamfara State. Makwashi served in the House of Representatives, National Assembly, representing the Bakura/Maradun constituency from 1999 to 2003.
