= Zamfara State lead poisoning outbreak =

2010 lead poisoning incidents in Nigeria

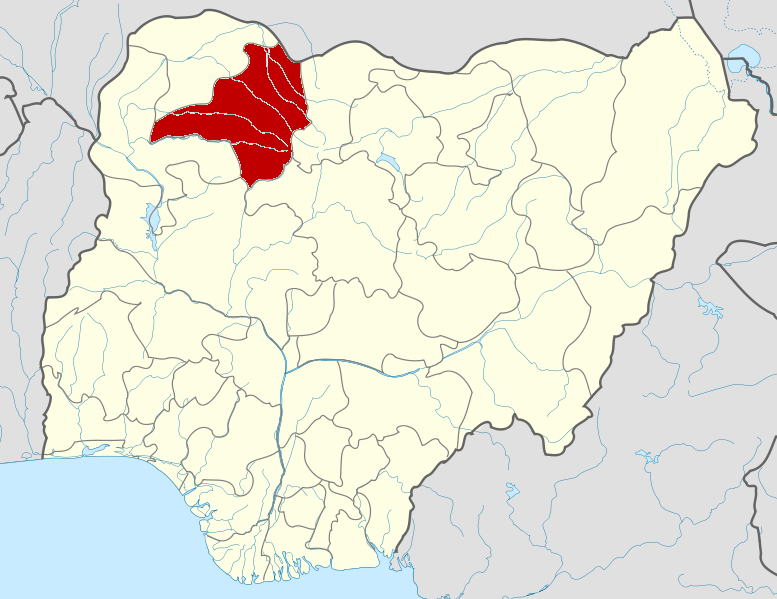
- Date: March - June 2010
- Location: Zamfara State, Nigeria
- Casualties: 355 cases discovered
- Deaths: 163+

A series of lead poisonings in Zamfara State, Nigeria, led to the deaths of at least 163 people between March and June 2010, including 111 children. Nigerian Federal Ministry of Health figures, state the discovery of 355 cases with 46 percent proving fatal. It was one of the many lead poisoning epidemics with low and middle income countries. By 2022, Médecins Sans Frontières stated that conditions had greatly improved after years of a lead poisoning intervention programme.

== Findings ==
An annual immunization programme in Northern Nigeria led to the discovery of a high number of child deaths in the area. An investigation showed that they had been digging for gold at the times of their deaths, in an area where lead is prevalent. It was thought by the villagers that all the children had contracted malaria but Médecins Sans Frontières (MSF) found unusually high levels of lead in the blood during tests. The BBC suggested the contamination of water may have contributed to the high mortality rate. Blacksmith Institute (renamed Pure Earth) was called in by the Nigerian authorities to assist in the removal of toxic lead.

It is thought that the poisonings were caused by the illegal extraction of ore by villagers, who take crushed rock home with them to extract. This results in the soil being contaminated from lead which then poisons people through hand-to-mouth contamination. Others have been contaminated by contact with contaminated tools and water.

== Actions ==
In an effort to halt the epidemic, the authorities are clamping down on illegal mining and carrying out a clean-up of the area. The number of cases has fallen since April when illegal mining in the area was halted, and some of the residents were evacuated. Education on health and the dangers of lead mining is also being given to local people. It is hoped that the clean-up can be completed prior to the start of the rainy season in July, which will spread contaminants, though it is being hampered by the remoteness of the villages and Muslim restrictions preventing men from entering some compounds.

Those who died came from several villages. Five villages in the Local Government Areas of Anka and Bungudu were affected.

== Treatment ==
Two treatment camps were established by health authorities to deal with the crisis. The World Health Organization, Médecins Sans Frontières, and the Blacksmith Institute assisted with the epidemic. Federal health ministry epidemiologist Henry Akpan said: "We are working with the state ministry of health to give health education and create enlightenment on the dangers of illegal mining". Nigeria's chief epidemiologist Dr. Henry Akpan announced the discovery of the epidemic on 4 June 2010. Blacksmith has been removing toxic lead from houses and compounds in the villages, so that surviving children returning from treatment will not be re-exposed to toxic lead in their homes. The dimercaptosuccinic acid (DMSA) chelation therapy deployed to 3,180 children by MSF is associated with a substantial reduction in the mortality rate of observed and potential lead poisoning cases.

== See also ==
- 2009–2010 West African meningitis outbreak
- Related lists
  - List of epidemics
  - List of poisonings
