= Aishatu =

Aishatu is a given name. Notable people with the name include:

- Aishatu Dahiru Ahmed (born 1971), Nigerian politician
- Aishatu Jibril Dukku (born 1963), Nigerian educationist and politician
- Aishatu Madawaki (born 1951), Nigerian academic and politician
