= Mansur Dan-Ali =

Former Minister of Defence of Nigeria

Brigadier general Mansur Dan-Ali
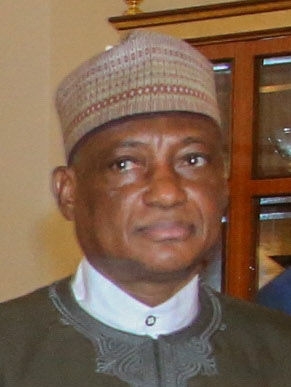

Minister of Defence
- In office 11 November 2015 – 29 May 2019
- Preceded by: Aliyu Mohammed Gusau
- Succeeded by: Bashir Salihi Magashi

Personal details
- Born: 25 August 1959 (age 67) Zamfara State, Nigeria
- Education: Nigerian Defence Academy; Bayero University Kano; Kaduna Polytechnic

Military service
- Allegiance: Nigeria
- Branch/service: Nigerian Army
- Years of service: 1984–2013
- Rank: Brigadier general

Mansur Muhammad Dan-Ali (born 25 August 1959) is a retired Nigerian Army brigadier general and former Minister of Defence of Nigeria appointed by President Muhammadu Buhari in November 2015.

== Early life and education ==
Dan-Ali was born on 25 August 1959, in Zamfara State. He attended Birnin Magaji Town Primary School (1966 -1972) for his elementary education and Government Secondary School, Shinkafi (1972-1977) for his secondary education. He received his Higher National Diploma (HND) in Photogrammetric and Surveying from Kaduna Polytechnic (1977-1982) and possesses a master's degrees in Public Policy and Administration (MPPA) from Bayero University Kano (2004-2005) and a master's degree in Security Studies from the Bangladesh University of Professionals (2009).

== Army career ==
Dan-Ali was commissioned as a 2nd Lieutenant in the Nigerian Army in 1984 through the Short Service Commission at the Nigerian Defence Academy. Dan-Ali has served in different command and staff capacities, some of which include commanding the Nigerian contingent supporting the United Nations Africa Hybrid Mission in Sudan. Dan-Ali was on the Directing Staff of the Armed Forces Command and Staff College, Jaji from 2003 -2005 and was Chief Instructor (CI) at the Nigerian Defence Academy in 2010. He was also Acting Director Military Training before getting posted to the Ministry of Defence's Logistics Department as Deputy Director. He retired from the Nigerian Army on 30 August 2013.

== Minister of Defence ==
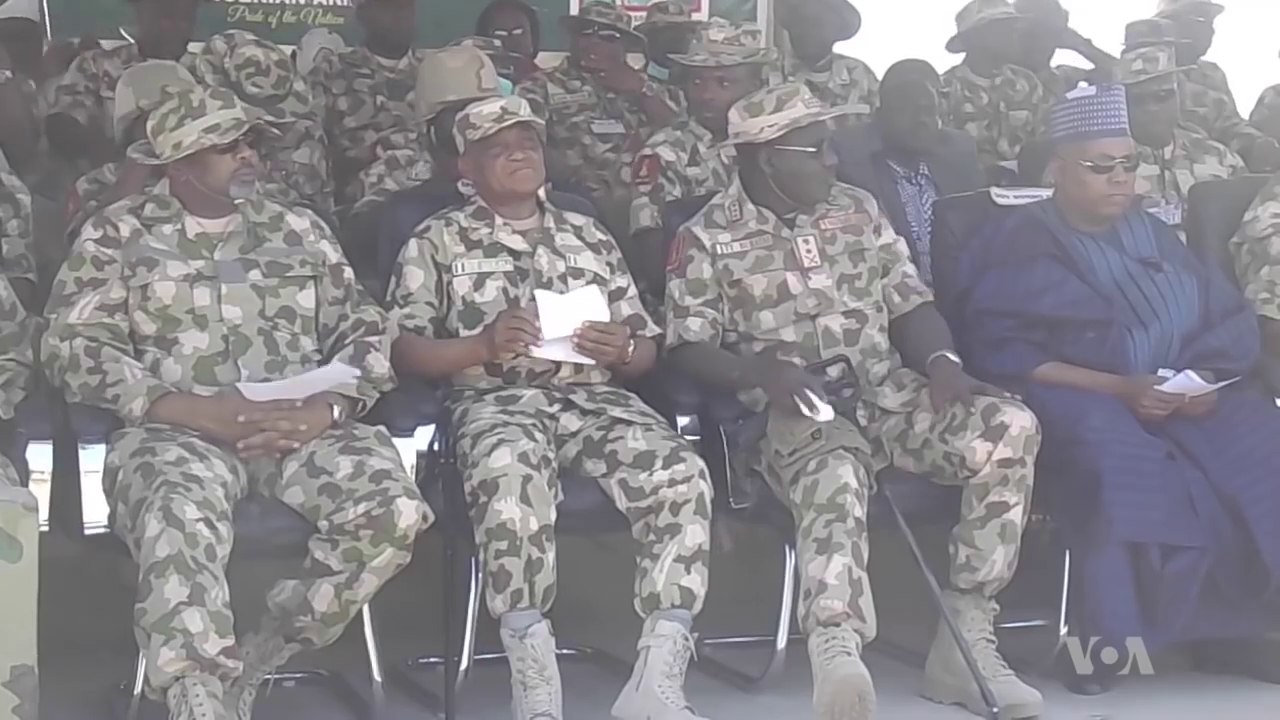
Mansur Dan-Ali (second from left) with General Tukur Yusuf Buratai and Governor Kashim Shettima (third and fourth from left) in Sambisa Forest, 2017.

Dan-Ali was confirmed as a Cabinet Minister by the Nigerian Senate in October 2015 and was appointed Minister of Defence by President Muhammadu Buhari in November 2015.
