= Zamfara State College Of Education =

College of education in Nigeria

Coordinates: 12.33297°N 6.40365°E

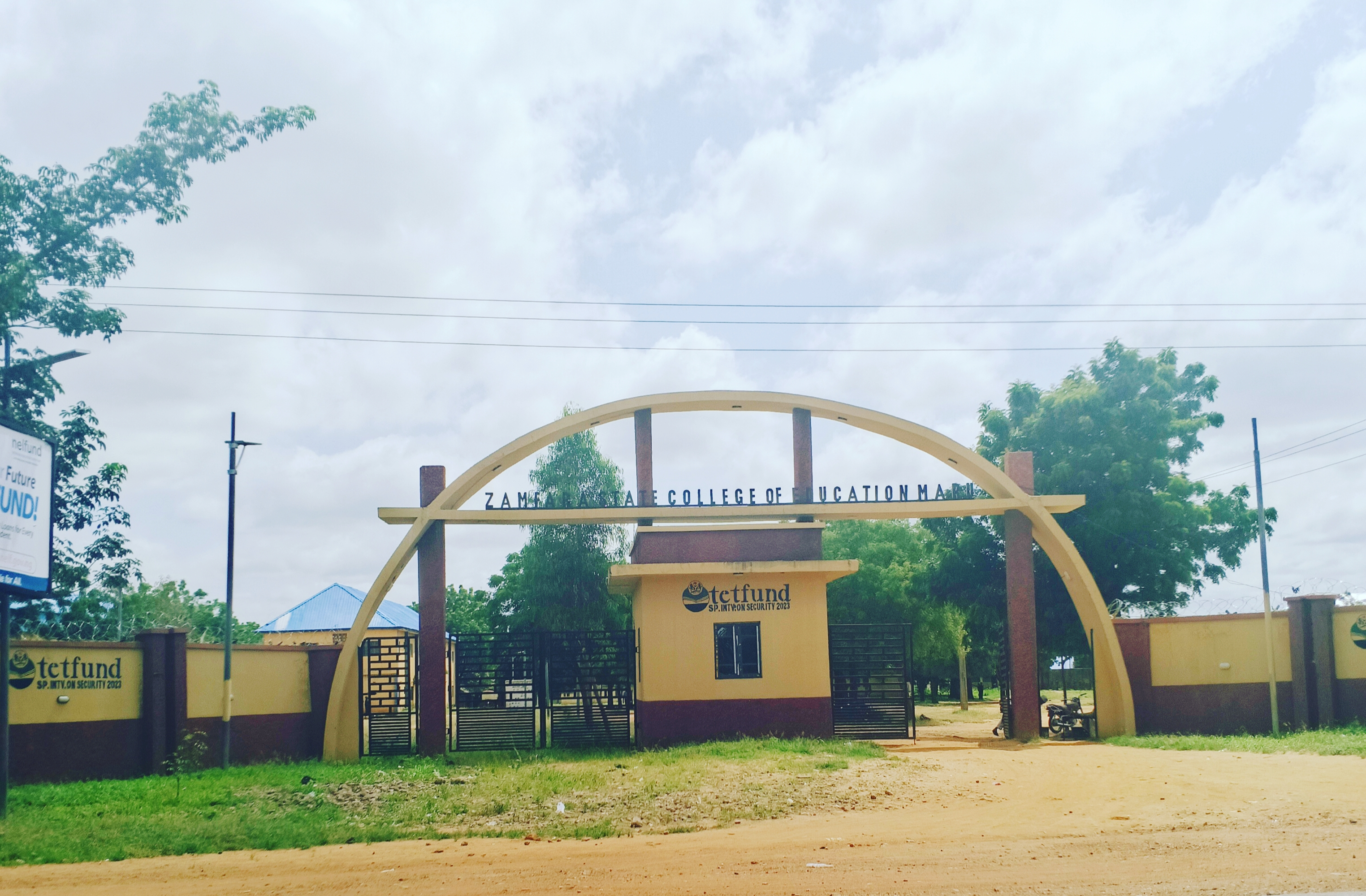
- Type: Public
- Established: 2000
- Provost: Dr. Abdullahi Haruna
- Location: Maru, Zamfara State, Nigeria
- Website: https://zcoemaru.edu.ng/

The Zamfara State College Of Education is a state government higher education institution located in Maru, Zamfara State, Nigeria. The current provost is Dr. Abdullahi Haruna while Murtala Aminu is the Deputy Provost Administration and the Deputy Provost Academics is Ibrahim Abubakar Lugga

== History ==
The Zamfara State College Of Education was established in 2000. It was formerly known as 'Teachers’ Training College (TTC)', was later changed to 'Advanced Teachers’ College ( ATC)' and later on renamed as Zamfara State College Of Education.

== Courses ==
The institution offers the following courses;

- Chemistry Education
- Biology Education
- Hausa
- Computer Education
- Arabic
- Geography
- English Education
- Mathematics Education
