= List of Nigerian states by poverty rate =

Poverty rate according to national estimate (2012)

This is a list of Nigerian states by poverty rate as of 2019. The international poverty rate used by the World Bank is used in the following list. The estimates can therefore differ from other estimates, like the national poverty rate. Nigeria is the country with the most people living in extreme poverty worldwide since 2019, overtaking much more populous India. The poverty rate in Nigeria remains one of the world's highest and is especially high in the north of the country.

== List ==
Percent of population living on less than $2.15, $3.65 and $6.85 a day, international dollars (2017 PPP) as per the World Bank.

Percent of population living on less than poverty thresholds
State	$2.15	$3.65	$6.85	Year of estimate
Nigeria	30.9%	63.5%	95.0%	2018
Taraba	80.4%	95.8%	99.3%	2018
Sokoto	79.9%	95.7%	99.2%	2018
Jigawa	78.8%	95.7%	99.5%	2018
Niger	72.8%	92.9%	99.4%	2018
Adamawa	63.7%	92.7%	99.1%	2018
Zamfara	62.0%	93.2%	99.3%	2018
Yobe	59.0%	92.2%	99.2%	2018
Katsina	55.3%	86.9%	98.7%	2018
Bauchi	49.7%	88.5%	99.0%	2018
Gombe	47.3%	84.1%	96.5%	2018
Nasarawa	44.2%	83.5%	98.4%	2018
Plateau	43.3%	75.8%	94.3%	2018
Benue	41.6%	85.8%	98.5%	2018
Kano	40.9%	79.3%	96.6%	2018
Kogi	39.9%	85.8%	98.6%	2018
Kebbi	38.9%	76.7%	96.5%	2018
Kaduna	37.3%	68.6%	91.6%	2018
Ekiti	26.1%	63.0%	92.8%	2018
Cross River	25.4%	66.9%	93.5%	2018
Ondo	21.5%	59.2%	92.0%	2018
Kwara	19.6%	66.8%	95.6%	2018
Ebonyi	19.3%	58.5%	94.2%	2018
Akwa Ibom	18.4%	55.4%	88.6%	2018
Ogun	17.7%	54.4%	89.8%	2018
Osun	16.2%	64.9%	95.0%	2018
Rivers	15.7%	48.0%	85.6%	2018
Bayelsa	13.3%	52.7%	89.2%	2018
FCT	11.7%	56.0%	93.4%	2018
Anambra	8.8%	47.2%	90.8%	2018
Edo	8.8%	35.3%	83.5%	2018
Enugu	6.7%	41.9%	89.2%	2018
Oyo	5.5%	33.0%	78.3%	2018
Abia	5.0%	30.3%	81.2%	2018
Lagos	3.8%	36.3%	86.0%	2018
Delta	2.9%	25.5%	72.1%	2018
Imo	1.3%	15.5%	66.7%	2018

== See also ==
- Poverty in Nigeria
