= Ikra Aliyu Bilbis =

Nigerian politician

Senator 10th National assembly
- Constituency: Zamfara Central Senatorial District

Personal details
- Party: Peoples Democratic Party (Nigeria) (PDP)
- Occupation: Politician

Ikra Aliyu Bilbis is a Nigerian politician. He currently serves as senator representing Zamfara North Senatorial District in the 10th National assembly under the platform of the Peoples Democratic Party (PDP). He was a former minister of information of the Federal Republic of Nigeria .
