= Mahdi Mohammed Gusau =

Nigerian politician and lawyer (born 1981)

Barr. Mahdi Mohammed Gusau

Deputy Governor of Zamfara State
- In office 29 May 2019 – 23 February 2022
- Governor: Bello Matawalle
- Preceded by: Ibrahim Wakkala Muhammad
- Succeeded by: Hassan Nasiha

Personal details
- Born: Mahdi Aliyu Mohammed Gusau; 5 December 1981 (age 44) Gusau, Sokoto State (now in Zamfara State), Nigeria
- Party: Peoples Democratic Party
- Parent: Aliyu Mohammed Gusau
- Education: Nigerian Military School Zaria
- Occupation: Politician; lawyer
- Website: https://www.instagram.com/barrmahdi/

Mahdi Aliyu Mohammed Gusau (born 5 December 1981) is a Nigerian politician and lawyer, he served as deputy governor of Zamfara State from 2019 to 2023. He was the Presidential Campaign Chairman 2023 election. He is a son of General Aliyu Mohammed Gusau who is a former Minister of Defence, Chief of Army Staff and National Security Adviser of Nigeria.

== Early life and education ==
Gusau was born on 5 December 1981 in Gusau, Nigeria to then Lieutenant Colonel Aliyu Mohammed Gusau who was the Director of Military Intelligence. He attended Nigerian Military school in Zaria from 1994 to 2000 where he obtained his senior secondary school leaving Certificate. He later proceeded to study law in a university where he obtained an LLB degree. His childhood dream was to serve Nigeria through military service and is now a lawyer and politician.

== Political career ==
Gusau started his political career as early as 2015, he contested for the National assembly representative of his constituency under Peoples Democratic Party (PDP) when he was 32. He was the running mate in the capacity of Deputy Governor to Bello Matawalle in the general election under the PDP. After the victorious election, Gusau was the youngest deputy governor in the Nigerian democracy and the fourth republic, in office when he was 37 years old. He successfully led the PDP party in his state after the defection of Matawalle in 2021. Many Nigerian youths look up to him as one of the ambassadors of the "Not Too Young To Run" project, having demonstrated his ability to stand his ground on his political principles and in the best interest of his people. He was able to resist external influences to leave his party for the APC despite the defection of Matawalle and other members of the state assembly. Gusau was the chairman of the PDP presidential campaign council in Zamfara state in the 2023 general election.

=== Impeachment and reinstatement ===
On 29 June 2021, the former governor of Zamfara state, a senator and members of the house of assembly cross carpeted from the PDP platform where they contested and won their respective offices into the APC platform. Gusau remained loyal to his party and refused to join the movement, which many Nigerians including Gen. Ibrahim Badamasi Babangida commended. He later filed a suit against their defection suit marked "FHC/ABJ/CS/650/2021" and requested the court to declare their seats vacant as the law provided.

On 23 February 2022, the Zamfara State House of Assembly impeached Gusau as deputy governor and immediately replaced him with Senator Hassan Nasiha the serving senator representing Zamfara Central Senatorial District. The action which was condemned nationwide by H.E Atiku Abubakar, Peter Obi and more, following the adoption of a motion by Majority Leader, Faruku Dosara (APC -Maradun 1), at a plenary in Gusau. The motion came shortly after the House adopted the report of a panel led by Justice Haladu Tanko, which investigated alleged gross misconduct and abuse of office against him. The Speaker Nasiru Muazu Magarya, who presided over the sitting, directed the Clerk, Saidu Anka, to conduct a voice vote on the impeachment. Twenty of the 22 lawmakers present voted in favour of the impeachment; however, it was later uncovered that the impeachment was backed baseless insubordination and abuse of office allegations by the defectors.

Gusau was restored as the deputy governor of Zamfara following the order by the federal high court in Abuja by Justice Inyang Ekwo. All the actions taken towards the illegal impeachment were reverted by the federal high court.

=== Governorship Election ===
Mahdi Aliyu Mohammed Gusau won the 2027 ADC Governorship Primary Election of the ADC Party, defeating two other candidates with 35,665 votes, while Abdul'mutallab Ahmed Mohammed scored 15,922 votes, and Shehu Ahmed Musa Score 7,642 votes.

== Awards and recognition ==
- Peace Achiever International award for national building and peace related programme in the sector.
- Federal Road Safety Commission honorary special marshal position
- Presidential campaign council chairman of the PDP 2023 General election in Zamfara state.
- Ambassador of the National Open University of Nigeria.

== Projects ==
- Unveiled the NEC ICT Center in Zamafara state
- Chairman impact and relief committee on covid-19 in Zamfara state
- Sponsored over 329 state indigenes for studies at various institutions of higher e-learning
- Flag off capacity Building workshop by Senator Hassan
- Flag off the 2020 Seasonal Malaria Chemoprevention integrated insecticide treated nets in Zamfara State.
- Flag off the distribution of palliative materials to the needy and disabled people in the state held at Mallaha Ginery Gusau.
- Flag off the distribution of ICT gadgets to Beneficiaries of a workshop on computer literacy and usage organized by the state Local Government service on 2 January 2020.
- Flag off the 10th Zamfara Domestic Trade fair 2019-2020
- Flag off the Community Nursing and Midwifery Gusau on 24 June 2020.
- Flag off the distribution of relief materials donated by National commission for refugees, migrants, and internally Displaced persons on 4 June 2020.
- Actively involved in the rehabilitation of freed prisoners during the administration
- Distributed Ramadan Package to over 1000 less privilege individuals in the state in 2021.
- Sponsored 200 students for Diploma courses
- Intervened and worked closely with N-Power and Conditional cash transfer officials in Zamfara state.
