= Hassan Nasiha =

Nigerian politician (born 1960)

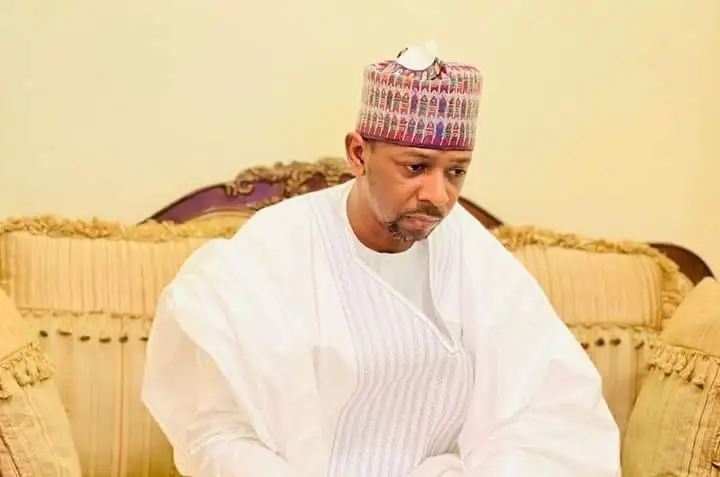

Deputy Governor of Zamfara State
- In office 23 February 2022 – 29 May 2023
- Governor: Bello Matawalle
- Preceded by: Mahdi Mohammed Gusau
- Succeeded by: Mani Mallam Mummuni

Senator for Zamfara Central
- In office 29 May 2019 – 23 February 2022
- Preceded by: Kabir Garba Marafa
- Succeeded by: Ikira Aliyu Bilbis
- In office 29 May 2007 – 29 May 2011
- Preceded by: Saidu Dansadau
- Succeeded by: Kabir Garba Marafa

Personal details
- Born: 12 December 1960 (age 65) Zamfara State, Nigeria
- Party: All Progressive Congress (APC)

Hassan Muhammad Gusau, (born 12 December 1960) known as Hassan Nasiha, is a Nigerian politician who served as deputy governor of Zamfara State from 2022 to 2023. He took office in 2022 following the impeachment of Mahdi Mohammed Gusau. He was appointed deputy governor by Governor Bello Matawalle after Mahdi Mohammed Gusau was impeached by the Zamfara State House of Assembly on 23 February 2022.

Nasiha is a member of the All Progressive Congress (APC). He defected from PDP to APC alongside the state governor Bello Matawalle and other diplomats. He was the serving senator since 2019 for Zamfara Central in the 9th National Assembly before his appointment as deputy governor. He previously served in this position from 2007 to 2011 losing reelection in 2011 to Kabir Garba Marafa.

== Education ==
Gusau obtained a Diploma in Nursing & Midwifery. He held appointments as Commissioner for Health, Commerce, Environment, Water Resources, Land & Housing, local government and chieftaincy affairs of Zamfara State (1999–2007).

After being elected to the Senate 2007 in the 6th National Assembly, he was appointed to committees on Science & Technology, Public Accounts, Marine Transport, Health, Gas and Employment, Labour & Productivity and in the 9th National Assembly 2019 he was the Chairman Senate committee on Ecology and climate change.
