= Aishatu Madawaki =

Nigerian academic and politician (born 1961)

Professor Aisha Madawaki Isah MFR MFR

Sokoto State Commissioner for Basic and Secondary education
- In office January 2018 – April 2018
- Governor: Aminu Tambuwal

Sokoto State Commissioner for Women Affairs and Social Development
- In office 1999–2003
- Governor: Attahiru Bafarawa

Personal details
- Born: 1961 (age 64–65) Gusau, Northern Region, British Nigeria (now in Zamfara State, Nigeria)
- Education: College of Education, Sokoto; Usman Danfodio University; Bayero University
- Awards: OFR

Aishatu Madawaki Isah MFR, MFR (born 1961) is a Nigerian academic and politician. She is the first female professor from the old Sokoto caliphate states (comprising present-day Sokoto State, Zamfara State and Kebbi State), an Islamic dominated region in Northern Nigeria. In 1999, she was made commissioner for women affairs and social development by Attahiru Bafarawa-led administration. Madawaki is also an advocate for the representation of Nigerian women in politics.

== Early life and education ==
Born in Gusau, Madawaki had her primary education in Sarkin Kudu Primary School. She proceeded to Government Girls Secondary School, Kotarkoshi for her secondary school. She obtained her National Certificate in Education from College of Education, Sokoto (renamed Shehu Shagari College of Education). After her program in the school, she began lecturing educational psychology at the institution. She got her master's degree from Usmanu Danfodio University, then her doctorate from Bayero University.

Madawaki is the first female professor in old Sokoto State, comprising three states in present-day Nigeria.

== Political career ==
Madawaki was made commissioner for women affairs and social development to the government of Attahiru Bafarawa between 1999 and 2003. Other roles she played in statewide capacities includes chairperson, Teachers Service board (2004–2007). In federal capacity, she was appointed member, Presidential Technical Committee on Housing and Urban Development between 2002 and 2004; member, Presidential Technical Board Federal Mortgage Bank, Abuja (2004–2007), and member, Infrastructure Concession Regulatory Commission, Abuja (2008–2012).

In 2014, she was selected as a delegate representing Sokoto State in the sovereign national conference, an initiative of President Goodluck Jonathan on finding lasting solutions to issues that arises in the co-habitation of Nigerians.

In 2017, she organized a peaceful protest in Sokoto State that called for a woman president in Nigeria and pushed for more representation of women within the state. This caused government officials in the state to reiterate their commitment towards gender equity in the state.

In January 2018, she was made commissioner for basic and secondary education for Sokoto State by Governor Aminu Waziri Tambuwal. In April 2018, along with the 24 other commissioners in the state, she was sacked by the government in what was termed by her employers as "restructuring and re-strategizing the cabinet for optimum efficiency and service delivery to the people of State".

Speaking on under age marriage among Northern women, Madawaki explained that she is more concerned about the orientation of the family of the girls as she was also married quite early but her parents knew the value of education and it didn't deter her from furthering it. In an interview published by a newspaper, Madawaki commented that marginalization of women in any form should be eradicated from the human space. Further stating that even though the dictates of a person's religion supersedes gender unification, women should not be viewed as being below men, because if given equal opportunities in certain aspects of life, they may even perform better than the male counterparts. She decried tribalism and favouritism in the Nigerian political and societal space as also being responsible for gender segmentation in Nigeria.

Madawaki is a recipient of national honours, MFR and OFR.
