= Mukhtar Shehu Idris =

Nigerian politician

- Born: April 4, 1974 (age 52); Tudun Wada
- Occupations: Administrator, politician
- Known for: Governor-elect for Zamfara State
- Political party: All Progressive Congress
- Opponents: Bello Matawalle PDP; Kabir Garba Marafa APC

Mukhtar Shehu Idris (born April 4, 1974) is a Nigerian administrator and politician. He was the governor-elect of Zamfara State in the 2019 gubernatorial election under the platform of All Progressive Congress (APC). Five days to his inauguration as governor of Zamfara State the Supreme Court annulled the election of Idris and all APC candidates in the 2019 elections and ordered Independent National Electoral Commission to declare all first runners in the election who satisfied the requirements of the law winners of the polls. His major challenger for the nomination of the APC for the governorship election in the state, Kabir Marafa [marafan gusau] had gone to court on the grounds that APC in Zamfara did not conduct primaries and prayed the court to disqualify all candidates of the party in the 2019 polls. Opposition People's Democratic Party candidates who lost at the polls were declared winners and became the major beneficiaries of the crisis in the APC. In January 2020, APC approached the Supreme Court for review of its earlier judgment but in a ruling on the 27 of March, 2020 the court declined a review of its own judgment which it said it is final and bidding on all parties in the case.

== Early life ==
He was born on April 4, 1974, in Tudun Wada, Gusau Local Government Area of Zamfara State.

== Education ==
After his primary education, he went to Government College Sokoto for his secondary education. He later studied at Bayero University Kano where he graduated with a BSc in Economics in 1997. In 2000, he returned to his alma mater where he obtained a master's degree in Banking and Finance. In 2003, he obtained a master's degree in International Affairs and Diplomacy from Ahmadu Bello University Zaria. He added two master's degree from Bayero University Kano in Development Studies (2005) and Treasury Management (2014).

== Career ==
He served as a youth corps member at the Family Support Trust Fund. His first appointment was as an Assistant Supervisor with Chattered Bank Plc in Lagos from 1998 to 1999. He joined Northco Holdings as an Admin Officer in 1999 and moved to Intercellular Nigeria Plc as an Assistant Manager in 2001. He was the managing director of Flamingo Resource Ltd Kano from 2007 to 2011.

In 2011, he was appointed the Commissioner for Housing and Urban Development by Governor Abdul'aziz Abubakar Yari of Zamfara State and was made the Commissioner for Finance in 2015, a position he held till 2018.

== Politics ==
His political career began in 2011 when he was called to serve his state, Zamfara, in 2011 when he was appointed Commissioner for Housing and Urban Development at the inception of the administration of the present governor and in 2015 was reappointed Commissioner for Finance. He contested the Gusau/Tsafe Federal Constituency of Zamfara State on the platform of Peoples Democratic Party (PDP) but was not given the ticket. He later defected to the All Nigeria Peoples Party (ANPP). He won the governorship primaries of the All Progressive Congress (APC) for Zamfara State in October 2018. Alhaji Mukhtar was elected as the Governor of Zamfara State at the 2019 gubernatorial elections held on March 9, 2019.

== Personal life ==
He is married with children.
