= Mani Mallam Mummuni =

Deputy Governor Zamfara State

His Excellency Mani Mallam Mummuni

Deputy Governor of Zamfara State
- Incumbent
- Assumed office 29 May 2023
- Governor: Dauda Lawal
- Preceded by: Hassan Nasiha

Personal details
- Born: 14 April 1961 (age 64) NIgeria
- Party: All progressive congress
- Profession: Politician

Mani Mallam Mummuni (born 14 April 1961) is a Nigerian politician who has served as Deputy Governor of Zamfara State since 2023. He was elected Deputy Governor alongside Governor Dauda Lawal during the 2023 Governorship election.

Since coming into power, measures have been taken to combat insecurity. Initiatives and relief are also put in place for victims.

He was in attendance at the 5th executive council meeting at council chamber, Government House Gusau.
