= Zamfara State House of Assembly =

Legislative arm of a state government in Nigeria

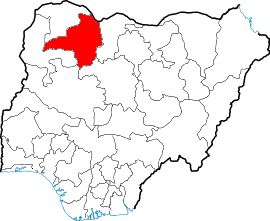
Zamfara State Nigeria

The Zamfara State House of Assembly is the legislative chamber of Zamfara State in Nigeria.

The Zamfara State House of Assembly has 24 members, each representing a constituency within the state. These members are elected to represent their constituents and participate in the legislative process of the state. The 2019 elections saw all 24 seats contested, with the APC winning the majority.

Current Speaker: Bilyaminu Ismail Moriki

== See also ==
Website: https://zsha.zamfara.gov.ng/
