= Kabir Garba Marafa =

Nigerian politician (born 1960)

- Senator Marafa

Senator for Zamfara Central
- In office June 2011 – June 2019
- Preceded by: Hassan Nasiha
- Succeeded by: Hassan Nasiha

Personal details
- Born: 16 September 1960 (age 66) Yandoton daji, tsafe local govt. Zamfara state.
- Party: African Democratic Congress (ADC)
- Education: Kaduna Polytechnic, Kennedy School of Government, Harvard University
- Occupation: Politician
- Profession: Chemical Engineer

Kabir Garba Marafa CON OFR is a Nigerian politician born on September 16, 1960, in Yandoton Daji, Birnin Yandoto Emirate, Tsafe Local Government, Zamfara State . He served as Senator for Zamfara Central from 2011 to 2019 under the umbrella of the All Progressives Congress (APC).Marafa was Vice Chairman of the Senate Committee on Petroleum Resources Upstream in the 7th Assembly, he became the Chairman of the Senate Joint Committee on Petroleum Resources in the 8th Assembly, and was a member of many other committees.He sponsored the Petroleum Industry BillIn August 2025, and lobbied vigorously for the creation of the Presidential Initiative on Zamfara State (PIZAMS) . Marafa contributed significantly to the establishment of Federal University Gusau and the Department of Petroleum Resources (DPR) office in Gusau.In August 2025, Marafa resigned from the APC, and on 8 April 2026 he joined the African Democratic Congress (ADC).

== Early life and education ==
Senator Marafa is the great-grandson of Mal Sambo Dan Ashafa, the founder of Gusau. He was born into the family of Alhaji Garba Gusau Marafan Yandoton-Daji (District Head of Yandoton-Daji).

- Attended Yandoton-Daji Islamiya School
- Attended LEA Primary School Yandoton Daji and later Government Secondary Technical School in Gusau
- Graduated with National Diploma and Higher National Diploma in Chemical Engineering from the prestigious Kaduna Polytechnic
- Completed Postgraduate Diploma in International Relations and Diplomacy from the same Kaduna Polytechnic
- Awarded Executive Certificate in Public Leadership from Harvard Kennedy School of Government, Massachusetts, USA, in 2019

.

== Career highlights ==
- Marafa Served as Commissioner for Water Resources and Education in Zamfara State
- Elected Senator for Zamfara Central in 2011 and Re-elected in 2015
- Chaired Senate Committee on Petroleum Downstream
- Served as Zamfara State Coordinator for the Tinubu/Shattima Presidential Campaign in 2023
- Held position as Chairman of the Governing Council Of Federal College of Education in Yola
- Worked with the Nigerian National Petroleum Cooperation NNPC in the Kaduna Refining and Petroleum Company KRPC as process Engineer.

== Politics ==
Marafa served as Senator representing Zamfara Central from 2011 to 2019, under the umbrella of the All Progressives Congress (APC). Marafa was the Vice Chairman of the Senate Committee on Petroleum Resources Upstream in the 7th Assembly. He became the Chairman of the Senate Joint Committee on Petroleum Resources in the 8th Assembly and the membership of many other Committees.Marafa played a significant role in sponsoring motions and bills, including the Petroleum Industry Bill and lobbied vigorously for the creation of Presidential Initiative on Zamfara State (PIZAMS). . Senator Marafa contributed immensely towards the establishment of the Federal University Gusau and established the Department of Petroleum Resources (DPR) Office in Gusau.

== Awards and honours ==
- Marafa was conferred with the National Honor of Commander of the Order of Niger (CON) in 2014
- Awarded National Honor of the Officer of the Order of the Federal Republic (OFR) in 2023
- Bestowed traditional title of "Marafan Gusau" by the Emir of Gusau.

== 2019 elections ==
In 2018, Senator Marafa ran for the governorship nomination of the All Progressives Congress (APC) in Zamfara State, but his bid was marred by internal conflicts within the party. The APC in Zamfara was divided into two factions: one under Marafa's leadership and the other led by then Governor Abdul'aziz Abubakar Yari. Each faction organized its own primary elections, which led to a dispute over the legitimacy of the process.

The Independent National Electoral Commission (INEC) recognized the candidates chosen by Yari's faction, but Marafa argued that no valid primaries had taken place. He insisted that the party’s internal process was flawed and that the primaries organized by Yari's faction were illegal. This disagreement led Marafa to challenge the primaries, eventually bringing the case to the Supreme Court of Nigeria.

On May 24, 2019, the Supreme Court ruled in favor of Marafa's position, declaring that the primaries conducted by Yari's faction were indeed illegal. The court’s decision invalidated the election of all APC candidates in Zamfara for the 2019 general elections. As a result, the APC’s votes in Zamfara were rendered void because the party failed to present valid candidates due to the lack of properly conducted primaries.
