= Bukkuyum =

Bukkuyum Bukkuyawa
- LGA and town
- Interactive map of Bukkuyum
- Location in Nigeria
- Coordinates: 12°00′N 5°37′E
- Country: Nigeria
- State: Zamfara State

Government
  - Emir: Muhammad Usman
  - Local Government Chairman: Nasiru Muhammad

Area
  - Total: 3,214 km^{2} (1,241 sq mi)

Population (2006 census)
  - Total: 211,633
  - Density: 65.85/km^{2} (170.5/sq mi)
- Time zone: UTC+1 (WAT)
- 3-digit postal code prefix: 891
- ISO 3166 code: NG.ZA.BY

Bukkuyum (or Bukwium) is a town and Local Government Area in Zamfara State, Nigeria. It has an area of 3,214 km^{2} and a population of 211,633 at the 2006 census.

The postal code of the area is 891.

== Geography ==
Bukkuyum local government area spans 3,214 square kilometres or 1,241 square miles, experiencing an average temperature of 35 degrees Celsius or 95 degrees Fahrenheit. It is densely covered with forests, including the Gando Forest Reserve. The humidity is measured at 15 percent, and the average wind speed is around 10 km/h or 6 mph.

=== Climate and Temperature ===
The environment has a hot, oppressive rainy season with predominantly cloudy skies and a blistering, partly cloudy dry season with temperatures ranging from 16 °C (61 °F) to 39 °C (103 °F).

The temperature trend in Bukkuyum is rising, with warmer years denoting a more hospitable climate and colder years denoting a less hospitable climate.

== Economy ==
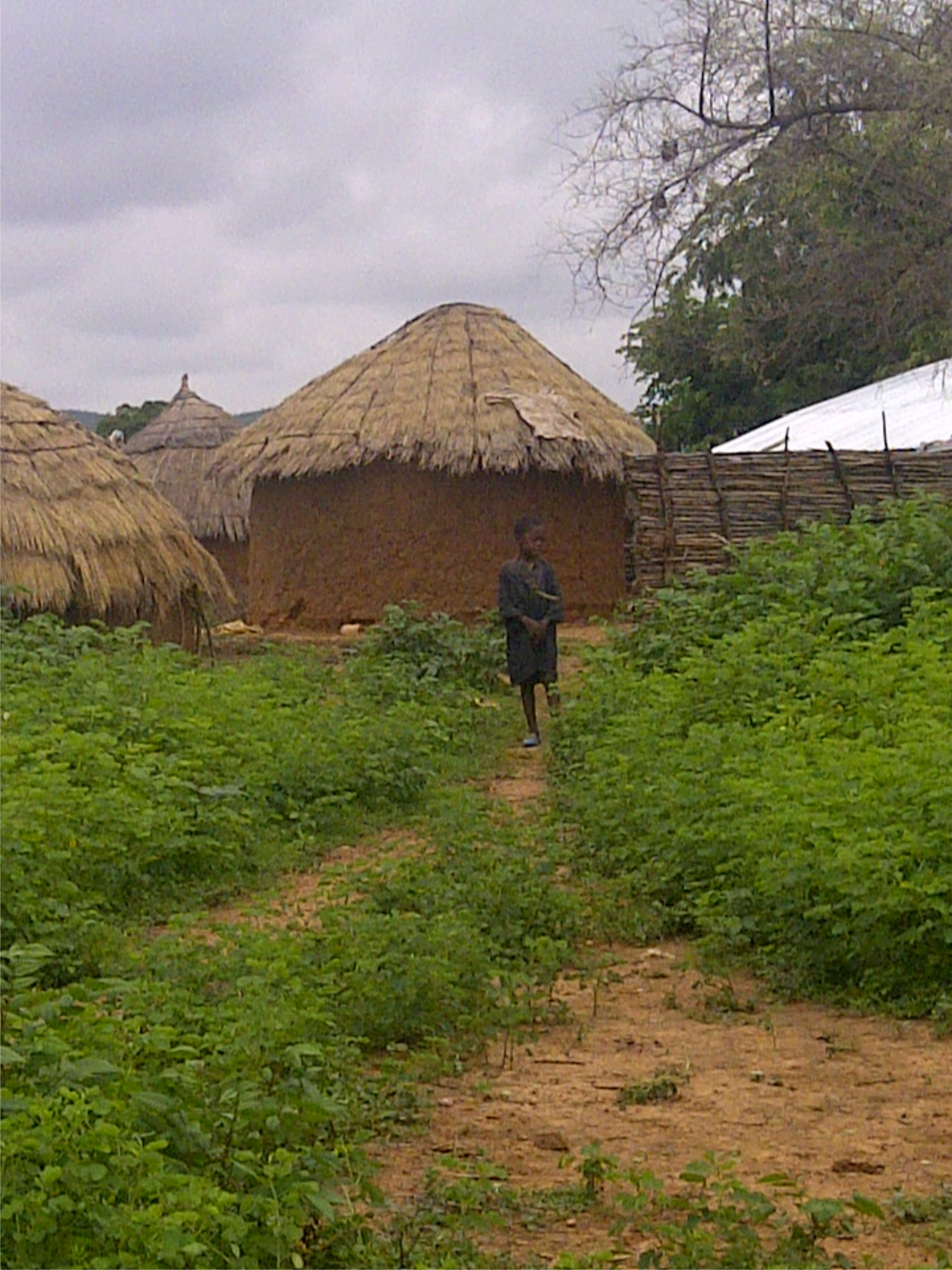
Bukkuyum Local Government Area, Zamfara state, Nigeria

The primary livelihood in Bukkuyum Local Government Area revolves around crop cultivation, particularly known for cultivating crops like cotton and millet. Moreover, the region possesses abundant mineral resources, including lead and gold, leading to a notable surge in mining activities in recent times.

In March 2017 more than 300 children died of lead poisoning from an illegal mining site at yar Galma village at 12°08′00″N 5°28′00″E in the north-west of the area.

== Districts and villages ==
- Zauma
- Zarummal
- Jema
- Yashi
- Ruwan
- Nasarawa
- Masama
- Adabka
- Gwashi
- Kyaram
