= Tsafe =

Tsafe Tsyahe
- LGA and town
- Interactive map of Tsafe
- Location in Nigeria
- Coordinates: 11°56′N 6°54′E
- Country: Nigeria
- State: Zamfara State

Government
  - Local Government Chairman: Garba Shehu Fanchers

Area
  - Total: 1,698 km^{2} (656 sq mi)
- Elevation: 565 m (1,854 ft)

Population (2006 census)
  - Total: 266,008
  - Density: 156.7/km^{2} (405.7/sq mi)
- Time zone: UTC+1 (WAT)
- 3-digit postal code prefix: 880
- ISO 3166 code: NG.ZA.TS

Tsafe (or Tsyahe) is a town and Local Government Area) in Zamfara State, Nigeria. Its headquarters is in the town of Chafe town. It shares boundaries with Gusau Local Government Area to the northwest, west, and south, while its northeastern and eastern borders connect with Katsina state. The local government council oversees public administration within the area, and its legislative council formulates laws that govern the local government jurisdiction.

== Geography ==
Its coordinates are 11°56′00″N 6°54′00″E. It has an area of 1,698 km^{2} and a population of 266,008 at the 2006 census. The postal code of the area is 880.

== Climate ==
In Tsafe, the dry season is partially cloudy and hot all year round, while the wet season is oppressive and generally cloudy. The average annual temperature ranges from 56 to 99 degrees Fahrenheit or 13 to 37.2 degrees Celsius, rarely falling below 11 °C (51 °F) or rising over 40 °C (104 °F).

From 7 March to 5 May, the hot season, with an average daily high temperature exceeding 36 °C (96 °F), lasts for 1.9 months. With an average high of 37 °C (98 °F) and low of 22 °C (72 °F), April is the hottest month of the year in Tsafe.

Between 8 July and 1 October, which is the length of the chilly season, the daily high temperature typically falls below 31 °C (87 °F). With an average low of 14 °C (57 °F) and high of 31 °C (87 °F), January is the coldest month of the year in Tsafe.

== Economy ==
Tsafe Local Government Area serves as a center for the breeding and trading of various domestic animals like camels and donkeys. It is renowned for its thriving trade industry, hosting several markets where a diverse range of goods are exchanged. Additionally, the residents of Tsafe Local Government Area actively participate in activities such as pottery, blacksmithing, and agriculture.

== Topography ==
For the purposes of this report, Tsafe is located at a latitude of 11.958 degrees, a longitude of 6.921 degrees, and an elevation of 565 metres (1,854 ft).

The terrain within a 3.2-kilometre/2-mile radius of Tsafe exhibits significant fluctuations in elevation, with the highest point being 255 metres (837 ft) above sea level and an average elevation of 574 metres (1,883 ft). Within a 177-kilometre/110-mile radius, there are also substantial elevation variations, totaling 343 metres (1,125 ft). Extending the range to 80 kilometres or 50 miles reveals notable elevation changes, amounting to 492 metres (1,614 ft).

The area within a 3.2-kilometre/2-mile radius of Tsafe predominantly comprises cropland (64%), grassland (15%), trees (11%), and shrubs (10%). Expanding the scope to a 16-kilometre/10-mile radius, the landscape consists of cropland (62%) and grassland (16%). When considering a 80-kilometre/50-mile radius, the land cover consists of cropland (65%) and grassland (14%).

== Districts and Villages ==
1. Tsafe Central
2. Bilbis
3. Chediya
4. Danjibga/Kunchin kalgo
5. Dauki
6. Keta
7. Kwaren Ganuwa
8. Yandoton Daji
9. YanKuzo A
10. Yankuzo B
11. YanWari
