= Zurmi =

- LGA and town
- Interactive map of Zurmi
- Location in Nigeria
- Coordinates: 12°51′N 6°44′E
- Country: Nigeria
- State: Zamfara State

Government
  - Local Government Chairman: Aminu Atiku Zurmi

Area
  - Total: 2,834 km^{2} (1,094 sq mi)

Population (2006 census)
  - Total: 293,837
- Time zone: UTC+1 (WAT)
- 3-digit postal code prefix: 882
- ISO 3166 code: NG.ZA.ZU

Zurmi is a town and Local Government Area in Zamfara State, Nigeria.

It has an area of 2,834 km^{2} and a population of 293,837 at the 2006 census.

The postal code of the area is 882. it shares border with Niger republic from the North and Katsina state from East its end stop at the most populated village Gurbin Bore under Kwashabawa ward after crossed the inter-state bridge constructed in the early 1990, 4 years after the establishment of the whole state in 1996.

== Flooding ==
An official reported in 2020 that a flood calamity that struck Zamfara State on Wednesday damaged 110 homes in the local government area of Zurmi.

The Nigerian Metrological Agency (NiMet) has identified seven Local Government Areas in the state that it expects to be subjects to flood during the 2020 rainy season, including Zurmi.

== Climate ==
The temperature ranges from 15 °C (59 °F) to 38,8 °C (102 °F) year-round and is oppressively hot, cloudy, and windy during the dry season.

=== Average temperature ===
The hot season, which runs from March 16 to May 22, lasts for 2.2 months and with daily highs that average more than 37,2 °C (99 °F). With average high temperatures of 38,8 °C (102 °F) and low temperatures of 25 °C (77 °F), April is the hottest month of the year in Zurmi. The average daily high temperature during the 1,6-month mild season, which runs from December 9 to January 29, is below 31,1 °C (88 °F). With an average low of 15,5 °C (60 °F) and high of 30,5 °C (87 °F), January is the coldest month of the year in Zurmi.

== Notable people ==
- Muhammadu Namoda
