= Talata Mafara =

Town in Zamfara State, Nigeria

- LGA and town
- Interactive map of Talata Mafara
- Location in Nigeria
- Coordinates: 12°21′N 6°04′E
- Country: Nigeria
- State: Zamfara State

Area
  - Total: 1,430 km^{2} (550 sq mi)

Population (2006 census)
  - Total: 215,178
- Time zone: UTC+1 (WAT)
- 3-digit postal code prefix: 892
- ISO 3166 code: NG.ZA.TM

Talata Mafara is a town and Local Government Area in Zamfara State, Nigeria. The town lies on the southern edge of the major irrigation project fed by the Bakolori Dam. The town is the birthplace of Yahaya Abdulkarim, governor of Sokoto State from January 1992 to November 1993.

It has an area of 1,430 km^{2} (550 sq mi) and a population of 215,178 at the 2006 census.

== Geography ==
Talata Mafara LGA has an average temperature of 34 degrees Celsius or 93 degrees Fahrenheit and a total area of 1,430 square kilometres or 550 square miles. The average wind speed in the LGA is 11 km/h or 6.8 mph, and it is located near the Sokoto River. There are also large areas of dry, desert-like territory in Talata Mafara LGA.

=== Climate ===
The dry season in Talata Mafara is oppressively hot and partially cloudy, whereas the wet season is oppressively hot and generally cloudy. The average annual temperature ranges from 16 to 39 °C (61 to 103 °F), rarely falling below 13 °C (56 °F) or rising over 42 °C (107 °F).
