= Gummi, Nigeria =

Gummi
- LGA and town
- Interactive map of Gummi
- Location in Nigeria
- Coordinates: 12°03′N 5°10′E
- Country: Nigeria
- State: Zamfara State

Government
  - Local Government Chairman: Aminu Nuhu

Area
  - Total: 2,610 km^{2} (1,010 sq mi)
- Elevation: 233 m (764 ft)

Population (2006 census)
  - Total: 204,539
- Time zone: UTC+1 (WAT)
- 3-digit postal code prefix: 891
- ISO 3166 code: NG.ZA.GM

Gummi is a town and Local Government Area in Zamfara State, Nigeria.

It has an area of 2,610 km^{2} and a population of 204,539 at the 2006 census.

The postal code of the area is 891.

Gummi was carved out of the former larger Sokoto state, which included the present Zamfara and Kebbi states. Gummi has a long history of relative peace and security.

The great majority of the people of the area are Hausa, Fulani and Muslims and they are predominantly farmers; the principal crop is calabash.

== Climate ==
The weather changes throughout the year, with a wet season that is hot and oppressive and a dry season that is hot and partly cloudy.

=== Temperature ===
Gummi is experiencing a warmer climate as a result of climate change, with a positive trend of increasing temperatures indicating a shift toward a more sustainable and resilient climate.

=== Cloud ===
Gummi experiences notable seasonal fluctuations in the average cloud coverage percentage throughout the year.

The period of clearer skies in Gummi typically commences on November 9, lasting for approximately 3.9 months until around March 6.

January stands out as the clearest month in Gummi, where the sky is predominantly clear, mostly clear, or partly cloudy, accounting for an average of 65% of the time.

Conversely, the cloudier phase starts around March 6, spanning approximately 8.1 months until November 9.

May emerges as the cloudiest month in Gummi, characterized by overcast or mostly cloudy skies, constituting an average of 71% of the time.

== Locality ==
Towns and Villages under Gummi Local Government Area:

1. Bardoki
2. Birnin-Magaji
3. Birnin-Tudu
4. Falole
5. Ubandawaki
6. Shiyar-Rafi
7. Gayari
8. Gyalange
9. Famo
10. Felfeldu
11. Illelar-Awal

== Gallery ==
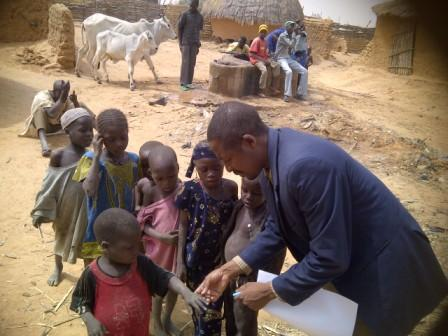
Polio vaccination campaign in Gummi Local Government Area

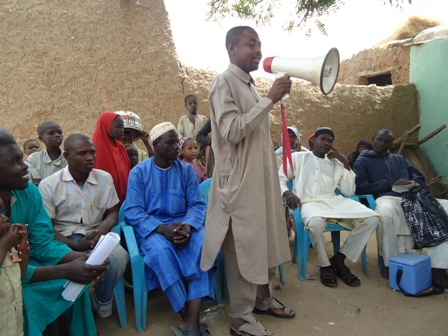
Discussing the importance of vaccination

== Topography ==
For the purpose of this report, Gummi is situated at geographical coordinates of 12.145 degrees latitude, 5.118 degrees longitude, and an elevation of 233 m (764 ft).

The landscape within a 3.2-kilometre (2 mile) radius of Gummi features relatively small changes in elevation, with the most significant elevation difference being 32 m (105 ft), and an average elevation of approximately 232 m (762 ft) above sea level. Extending the radius to 16 km (9.9 mi) continues to exhibit moderate modest elevation changes, amounting to 320 m (1,050 ft).

The region within a 3.2-kilometre (2 mile) radius of Gummi primarily comprises cropland (66%) and grassland (12%). Expanding the analysis to a 16-kilometre (10 mile) radius, the land cover remains dominated by cropland (69%) and grassland (12%). When encompassing a 80-kilometre (50 mile) radius, the land use pattern remains consistent, with cropland covering 69% and grassland (12%) of the area.
