= Birnin Magaji/Kiyaw =

- LGA
- Interactive map of Birnin Magaji/Kiyaw
- Location in Nigeria
- Coordinates: 12°28′N 6°54′E
- Country: Nigeria
- State: Zamfara State
- Headquarter: Birnin Magaji

Government
  - Local Government Chairman: Hon. Isiyaka Ibrahim

Area
  - Total: 1,188 km^{2} (459 sq mi)

Population (2006 census)
  - Total: 178,619
  - Density: 150.4/km^{2} (389.4/sq mi)
- Time zone: UTC+1 (WAT)
- 3-digit postal code prefix: 882
- ISO 3166 code: NG.ZA.BM

Birnin Magaji/Kiyaw is a Local Government Area in Zamfara State, Nigeria. Its headquarters are in the town of Birnin Magaji (or Magare) in the north of the LGA at12°33′00″N 6°49′00″E. The LGA is also named from the town of Kiyaw (or Kiawa) to the south.

It has an area of 1,188 km^{2} and a population of 178,619 at the 2006 census.

The postal code of the area is 882.

== Climate ==
In Birnin Magaji, the dry season is windy and partly cloudy, and it is hot all year round. The wet season is oppressive and generally cloudy. The average annual temperature ranges from 15 to 38.3 degrees Celsius or 59 to 101 degrees Fahrenheit, and it is infrequently below 54 or beyond 106 degrees Fahrenheit or below 12 or above 41.1 degrees Celsius.

The hot season lasts for 2.1 months, from March 15 to May 20, with an average daily high temperature of over 37 °C (98 °F). The hottest month of the year in Birnin Magaji is April, with an average high temperature of 38 °C (101 °F) and low temperature of 25 °C (77 °F).

A daily maximum temperature below 31 °C (88 °F) is typical during the chilly season, which runs from December 10 to January 28. With an average low of 16 °C (60 °F) and a high of 31 °C (87 °F), January is the coldest month of the year in Birnin Magaji.

Birnin Magaji Local Government Area experiences an average temperature of 34 degrees Celsius or 93.2 degrees Fahrenheit and spans an area of 1,188 square kilometres or 459 square miles. The humidity is recorded at 19%, and the average wind speed is 12 km/h (7.5 mph). This region has two primary seasons rainy and dry.

== Economy ==
The economic landscape of Birnin Magaji Local Government Area prominently involves agriculture, encompassing the cultivation of various cereals and legumes. Additionally, the residents actively participate in animal rearing, hunting, and trade as significant economic pursuits.

== Locality ==
Towns under Birnin Magaji Local Government Area:

1. Birnin-Magaji Ward
2. Darifami Ward
3. Sabon-Birnin
4. Gora
5. Gusami Gari
6. Gusami Hayi
7. Kiyawa
8. Modomawa East
9. Modomawa West
10. Nasarawa-Godol East
11. Nassarawa-Godol West
