= Anka, Nigeria =

Anka
- LGA and town
- Interactive map of Anka
- Location in Nigeria
- Coordinates: 11°59′N 6°02′E
- Country: Nigeria
- State: Zamfara State

Government
  - Local Government Chairman: Bashar Musa Anka

Area
  - Total: 2,746 km^{2} (1,060 sq mi)

Population (2006 census)
  - Total: 142,280
  - Density: 51.81/km^{2} (134.2/sq mi)
- Time zone: UTC+1 (WAT)
- 3-digit postal code prefix: 890
- ISO 3166 code: NG.ZA.AN

Anka is a town and Local Government Area in Zamfara State, Nigeria. It has an area of 2,746 km^{2} and a population of 142,280 at the 2006 census.

Anka Local Government Area of Zamfara is situated in the town of Anka as the chamber region covers different networks of Dan Galadima, Bagega, Waramu, Wuya, Yar'sabaya, Magaji, Sabon-Birni, Matseri and Barayar-Zaki.

Anka LGA has its regulatory central command situated in Anka Town. It is in the western part of the state of Zamfara. It is limited towards the north by Bakula and Talata Mafara nearby government regions, towards the east by Maru neighborhood government region, towards the south likewise by Maru neighborhood government region and towards the west by Bukkuyum neighborhood government region and Sokoto State.

The postal code of the area is 890.

== Climate ==
In Anka, the dry season is oppressively hot and partially cloudy, while the wet season is oppressively hot and predominantly cloudy. The average annual temperature ranges from high 15 °C (59 °F) to 39 °C (103 °F), rarely falling below 12 °C (54 °F) or rising over 42 °C (107 °F).

From March to May is the hot season, which lasts for two months and has an average daily high temperature of over 99 °F. In Anka, April is the hottest month of the year, with an average high of 102 °F and low of 76 °F.

From July to October, the cold season, which has an average daily high temperature below 89 °F, lasts for 2.8 months. With an average low of 60 °F and high of 92 °F, January is the coldest month of the year in Anka.

== Economy ==
Anka LGA is well-known for growing a variety of crops, including grains and groundnuts. The region is also rich in minerals, including gold and lead, and mining activities play a significant role in the local economy.

== Chairman ==
The Executive Chairman of Anka LGA is Alh Ahmed Balarabe Anka.

== Education ==
Anka LGA has a total primary school enrolment of 17,726, which has been concluded by combining the total number of male and female students in all of the LGA.

1. Male = fifteen thousand one hundred and seventy-two. (15,172)
2. Female = two thousand five hundred and fifty-four. (2,554)

This enrolment took place in the years between 1993 and 1999.

== Wards ==
Anka LGA has a total number of 10 wards. These include:

- Bagega
- Barayar Zaki
- Dan Galadima
- Galadima
- Magaji
- Masteri
- Sabon Birini
- Waramu
- Wuya
- Yar'sabaya

== Districts ==
- Dan Galadima
- Bagega
- Waramu
- Wuya
- Yar'sabaya
- Magaji
- Sabon-Birni
- Matseri
- Barayar-Zaki
