= Bungudu =

- LGA and town
- Interactive map of Bungudu
- Location in Nigeria
- Coordinates: 12°09′N 6°30′E
- Country: Nigeria
- State: Zamfara State

Government
  - Local Government Chairman: Nura Umar Bungudu

Area
  - Total: 2,293 km^{2} (885 sq mi)

Population (2006 census)
  - Total: 257,917
  - Density: 112.5/km^{2} (291.3/sq mi)
- Time zone: UTC+1 (WAT)
- 3-digit postal code prefix: 881
- ISO 3166 code: NG.ZA.BD

Bungudu (or Bungundu) is a town and Local Government Area on the Sokoto River in Zamfara State, Nigeria.

It has an area of 2,293 km^{2} and a population of 257,917 at the 2006 census.

The postal code of the area is 881.

== Climate ==
The wet season is oppressive, mostly cloudy, with a hot year-round temperature ranging from 15 °C (59 °F) to 38 °C (101 °F), with occasional drops above 41 °C (105 °F).

=== Temperature ===
The temperature is rising in Bungudu due to climate change, and this warming trend is pointing to a change in the direction of a more resilient and sustainable climate.

=== Geography ===
Bungudu LGA has an average temperature of 35 degrees Celsius or 95 degrees Fahrenheit and a total area of 2,293 square kilometres or 885 square miles. The average wind speed and humidity in the area are 7 km/h (4.3 mph) and 15%, respectively. The two main seasons that Bungudu LGA experiences are the wet and dry seasons.

== Economy ==
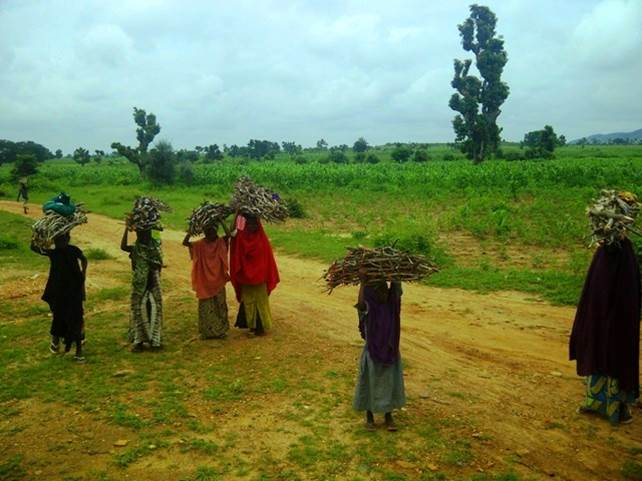
fire wood from farm in Bungudu Local Government Area, Zamfara

Bungudu LGA produces a wide range of crops, and the majority of its residents are subsistence farmers. In Bungudu LGA, hunting and pottery making are two more significant economic pursuits. Because there are multiple marketplaces in the area where a wide range of commodities are offered, trade plays a significant role in the economy of Bungudu LGA.
