= Maradun =

- LGA and town
- Interactive map of Maradun
- Location in Nigeria
- Coordinates: 12°45′N 6°17′E
- Country: Nigeria
- State: Zamfara State

Government
  - Local Government Chairman: Yahaya Giwa Maradun

Area
  - Total: 2,728 km^{2} (1,053 sq mi)

Population (2006 census)
  - Total: 210,852
  - Density: 77.29/km^{2} (200.2/sq mi)
- Time zone: UTC+1 (WAT)
- 3-digit postal code prefix: 892
- ISO 3166 code: NG.ZA.MD

Maradun is a town and Local Government Area in Zamfara State, Nigeria.

It had an area of 2,728 km^{2} and a population of 210,852 at the 2006 census.

The postal code of the area is 881.

== Climate ==
The yearly average high temperature in Maradun is 31,88 °C, with 86,4 rainy days (23,67% of the year) due to the high precipitation levels.

Climate change is causing a warmer climate in Maradun, as evidenced by the positive trend of temperature increase.

=== Average temperatures ===
There is an average daily high temperature of over 37,2 °C during the 1.9-month long hot season, which runs from March 13 to May 10. At 38,8 °C on average for highs and 25,5 °C for lows, April is the hottest month of the year in Maradun. Summer temperatures typically reach highs of 32,2 °C or lower during the 2.4-month cool season, which runs from July 2 to September 15. At an average low of 16,6 °C and high of 31,1 °C, January is the coldest month of the year in Maradun.
