= Bakura, Nigeria =

Bakura Baraden Bakura
- LGA and town
- Nickname: Ima
- Motto: Bakura garin burmi
- Interactive map of Bakura
- Location in Nigeria
- Coordinates: 12°09′N 5°54′E
- Country: Nigeria
- State: Zamfara State

Government
  - Local Government Chairman: Sa'idu Danbala

Area
  - Total: 1,366 km^{2} (527 sq mi)

Population (2006 census)
  - Total: 186,905
  - Density: 136.8/km^{2} (354.4/sq mi)
- Time zone: UTC+1 (WAT)
- 3-digit postal code prefix: 892
- ISO 3166 code: NG.ZA.BA

Bakura is a town and Local Government Area in Zamfara State, Nigeria.

It has an area of 1,366 km^{2}

== Population ==
Bakura has a population of 186,905 at the 2006 census.

The postal code of the area is 892.

== History ==
Bakura is one of the 14 local government area in Zamfara State, which was created out of Mafara local government area in 1991 by the military administration of General Ibrahim Babangida

== Geography ==
The LGA spans 1366 square kilometres or 527 square miles, experiencing distinct dry and rainy seasons. The humidity is recorded at 12 percent, with an average annual temperature estimated at 33 degrees Celsius or 91.4 degrees Fahrenheit.

=== Climate/Temperature ===
With temperatures ranging from 62 °F to 103 °F, the climate has two distinct seasons: a scorching, oppressive rainy season with predominantly cloudy skies, and a scorching, partly cloudy dry season.

The temperature trend in Bakura is rising, with warmer years denoting a more hospitable climate and colder years denoting a less hospitable climate.

== Economy ==
Agriculture plays a vital role in Bakura Local Government Area's economy, complemented by prominent activities such as hunting, cattle rearing, and trade. Additionally, the area boasts the substantial Bakolori Dam.

== Locality ==
Districts, Town and Villages under Bakura Local Government Area:

- Bakura
- Dakko
- Damri
- Dan Manau
- Dankadu
- Nasarawa
- Rini
- Yar Geda
- Yar Kufoji
- Birnin Tudu
