= Zamfara State =

State of Nigeria

Zamfara جهار زمفر
- State
- Zamfara State
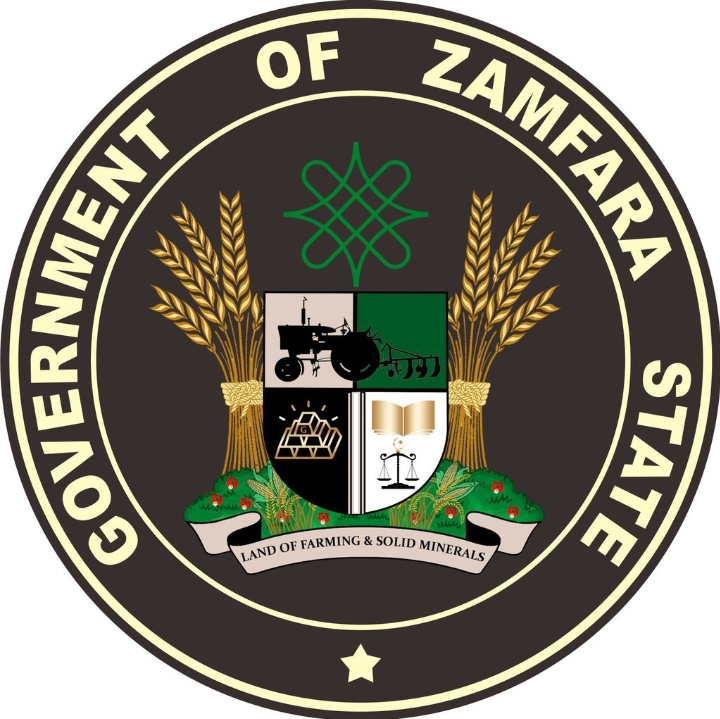
- Seal
- Nicknames: Farming is Our Pride
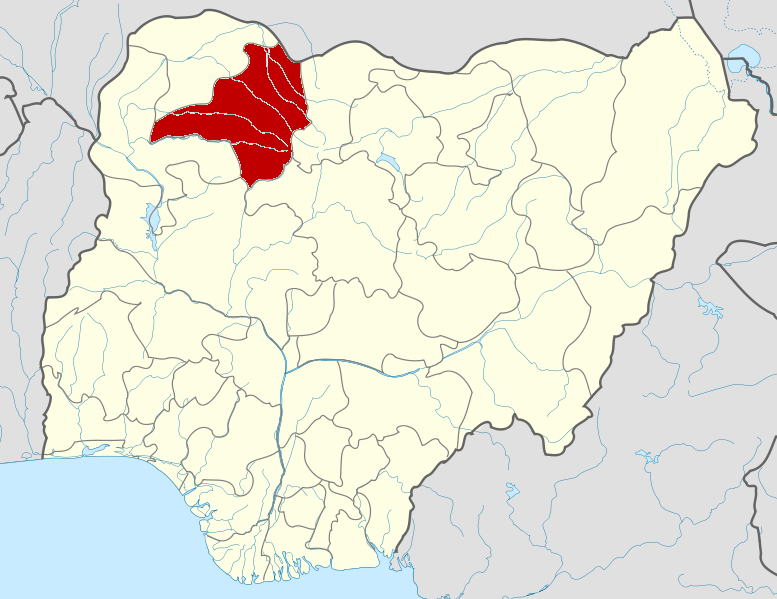
- Location of Zamfara State in Nigeria
- Coordinates: 12°10′N 6°15′E
- Country: Nigeria
- LGAs: 14
- Date created: 1 October 1996
- Capital: Gusau

Government
  - Body: Government of Zamfara State
  - Governor (List): Dauda Lawal (PDP)
  - Deputy Governor: Mani Mallam Mummuni (PDP)
  - Legislature: Zamfara State House of Assembly
  - Senators: C: Ikra Aliyu Bilbis (PDP); N: Sahabi Alhaji Yaú (APC); W: Abdulaziz Yari Abubakar (APC)
  - Representatives: List
  - Emir: Muhammad Attahiru Ahmad

Area
  - Total: 39,762 km^{2} (15,352 sq mi)
  - Rank: 7th of 36

Population (2006 census)
  - Total: 3,278,873
  - Estimate (2022): 5,833,500
  - Rank: 15th of 36
  - Density: 82.462/km^{2} (213.58/sq mi)
- Demonym: Zamfaran

GDP (PPP)
  - Year: 2021
  - Total: $11.18 billion 32nd of 36
  - Per capita: $2,108; 30th of 36
- Time zone: UTC+01 (WAT)
- ISO 3166 code: NG-ZA
- HDI (2022): 0.392 low · 34th of 37
- Website: www.zamfara.gov.ng

Zamfara State (Hausa: Jihar Zamfara; Fula: Leydi Zamfara; Adlam: 𞤤𞤫𞤴𞤣𞤭 𞤶𞤢𞤥𞤬𞤢𞤪𞤢) is a state in the North-West geopolitical zone of Nigeria. It is bordered by Sokoto to the northwest and west, Kebbi to the southwest, Niger and Kaduna to the south, and Katsina to the east, while a short section of its northern border forms part of the international border with the Niger. It takes its name from the Zamfara River, which flows through the state, and from the historic Kingdom of Zamfara. The state capital and largest city is Gusau. The state was formed on 1 October 1996, when the military government of Sani Abacha carved it out of Sokoto State alongside five other new states.

Of the 36 states, Zamfara is the seventh largest in the area and the twentieth most populous with an estimated population of about 5.5 million as of 2023. Geographically, the state lies almost entirely within the West Sudanian savanna and contains the Ka, Rima, Sokoto, and Zamfara rivers.

The state population is predominantly ethnic Hausa and Fulani peoples with small minorities of Gbagyi, Igbo, Kamuku, Nupe, Tiv, Yoruba, and Zarma groups. Religiously, the vast majority of the state's population is Muslim, with smaller Christian and traditionalist minorities. In 1999, Zamfara became the first Nigerian state to adopt Sharia criminal law.

In the pre-colonial period, the area that is now Zamfara State was mainly controlled by the Kingdom of Zamfara, a Hausa Banza bakwai state. In the sixteenth century, Zamfara became a tributary of the Kebbi Kingdom under Kanta Kotal, before regaining its independence through a revolt around 1715 alongside Gobir and Agadez. Its fortunes declined afterwards, with Gobir sacking Birnin Zamfara in the mid-eighteenth century and the Zamfara court eventually moving to Anka. In the early 1800s, the area was incorporated into the Sokoto Caliphate during the Fulani jihad. After the British conquered the Caliphate in 1903, the area became part of the Northern Nigeria Protectorate, which later merged into British Nigeria before becoming independent as Nigeria in 1960. Modern-day Zamfara State was originally part of the post-independence Northern Region until 1967, when the region was split and the area became part of the North-Western State. After the North-Western State was divided, Sokoto State was formed in 1976 alongside ten other states. Twenty years later, the state's eastern local government areas were broken off to form the new Zamfara State.

As a largely agriculturally-based state, with the slogan "Farming is Our Pride", Zamfara's economy has historically rested on crops — with over 80% of the population engaged in agriculture in crops such as cotton, groundnut, maize, millet, and rice — and livestock herding. Artisanal gold mining expanded rapidly from the late 2000s and led to a severe lead poisoning outbreak among children in 2010. Since the 2010s, the state has been one of the centres of armed banditry in northwestern Nigeria, marked by mass killings, kidnappings such as the 2021 Jangebe school abduction, and displacement from rural areas. The insecurity has affected development, and Zamfara has the fourth lowest Human Development Index and fifth lowest GDP in the country.

== History ==
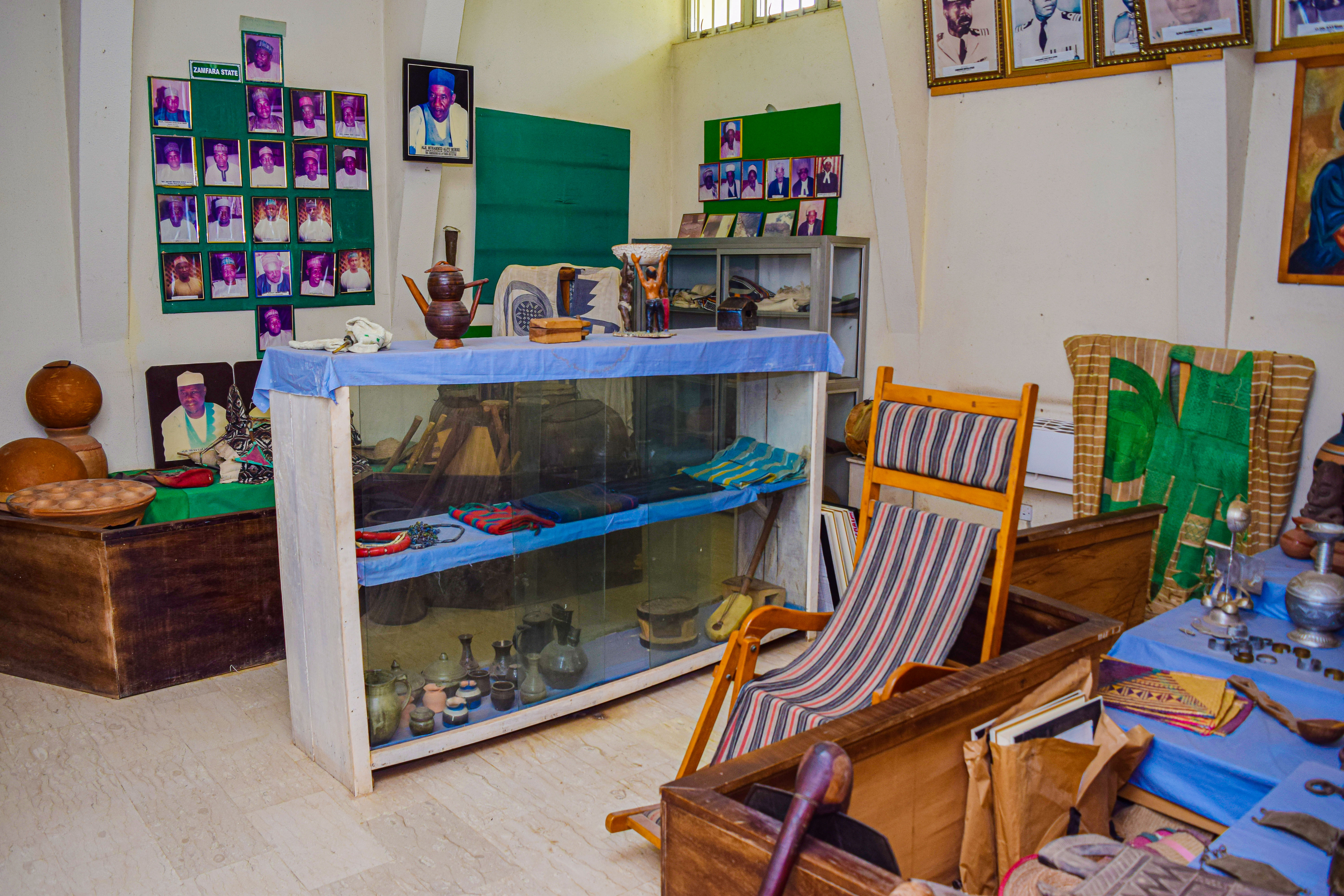
Zamfara State Museum.

The people of Zamfara have over the years struggled for autonomy, but it was not until 1996 that the then military administration of the late General Sani Abacha detached the Zamfara State from Sokoto State with an area of 38,418 square kilometres. The first Governor was Jibril Yakubu.

The area today called Zamfara state was one of the old Hausa Kingdoms like Kano, Katsina, Gobir, Kabi and Zazzau. The earliest inhabitants of Zamfara were said to have been hunters and giants. They established their first settlement at Dutsi, which was the first capital of Zamfara. It extends up to the bend of River Rima to the north west and River Ka in the south west. Zamfara Kingdom was established in the 11th century and flourished up to 16th century as a city-state. Its capital has shifted with the fortunes of the kingdom from place to place like Dutsi and Birnin Zamfara.

In the first half of the 18th century, its then capital Birnin Zamfara, was destroyed by the Gobir Kingdom and a new capital was established in Anka by the second half of the 19th century. Zamfara had many centres of commerce and scholarship that attracted many scholars like the Yandoto city. It became part of the Sokoto Caliphate after the 1804 jihad by Usman dan Fodio. In fact, Usman Danfodiyo settled in Sabon Gari where Sarkin Zamfara Abarshi had already established a garrison headquarters during the early days of his Jihad as a base from where he fought Gobir and Kabi.

At the wake of British colonialism, the emerging town of Gusau became an important commercial and administrative centre with road and rail networks passing through it. With the creation of states during the Gowon Administration, Zamfara Kingdom became part of the then North West state and later the Sokoto State.

== Geography ==
=== Climate ===
The climate condition of Zamfara is tropical with temperatures rising up to 38 °C (100.4 °F) and above between March and May. Rainy season starts in late May to September while the mild season known as Harmattan lasts from December to April. The hottest months in Zamfara are March and April, and that is just before the first rains. the onset of the rains bring a cooling effect with temperature dropping.

== Pollution ==
Significant health risks are posed by dust and particulate matter in Zamfara, especially to the deepest parts of the lungs, where they may exacerbate lungs diseases like bronchitis and asthma attacks while weakening the body defences against infections.

== Local Government Areas ==
Zamfara State consists of fourteen (14) Local Government Areas. They are:

- Anka
- Bakura
- Birnin Magaji/Kiyaw
- Bukkuyum
- Bungudu
- Chafe (Tsafe)
- Gummi
- Gusau
- Kaura Namoda
- Maradun
- Maru
- Shinkafi
- Talata Mafara
- Zurmi

== Demographics ==
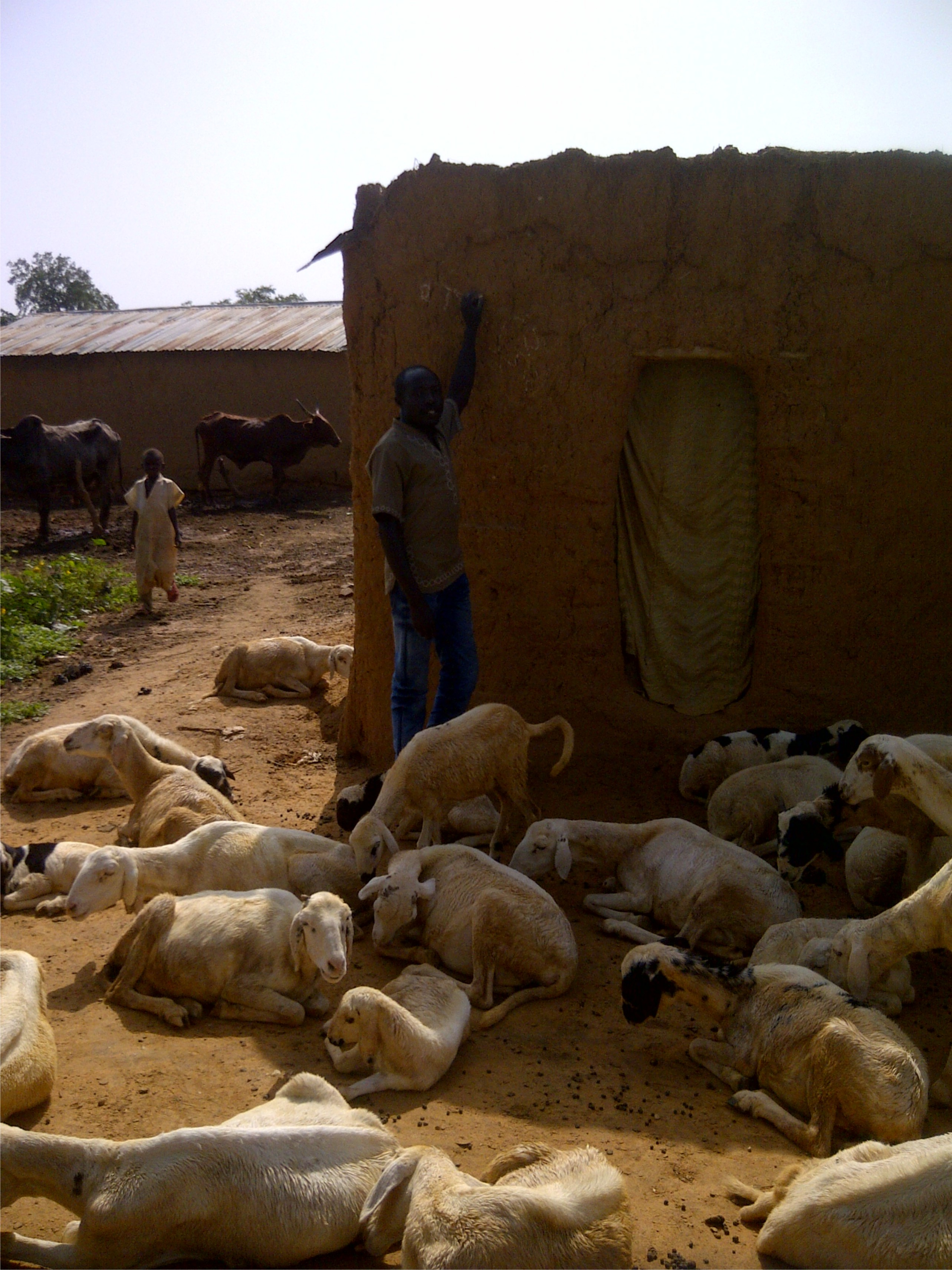
A household in Zamfara State

Zamfara State is mainly populated by Hausa.

The state capital is an important commercial centre with a heterogeneous population of people from all over Nigeria. As in all major towns in Nigeria, all the major towns in Zamfara have a large population of other peoples from different parts of Nigeria.

== Languages ==
English is spoken by the Zamfara state government as an official language, Hausa and Arabic language is spoken by the Muslim ummah and Islamic clerics.

== Economy ==
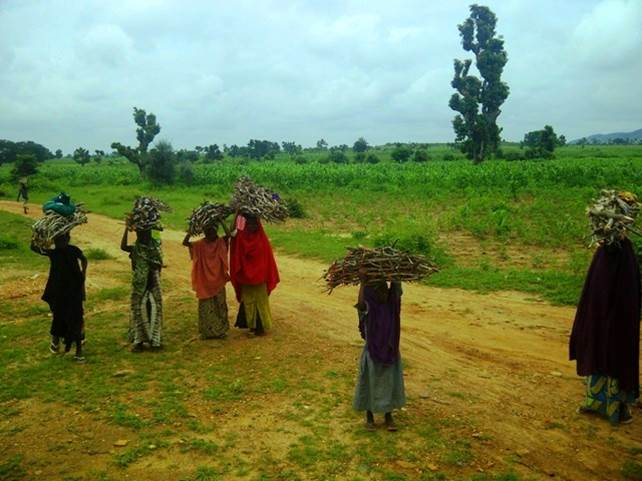
Gathering firewood in rural Zamfara

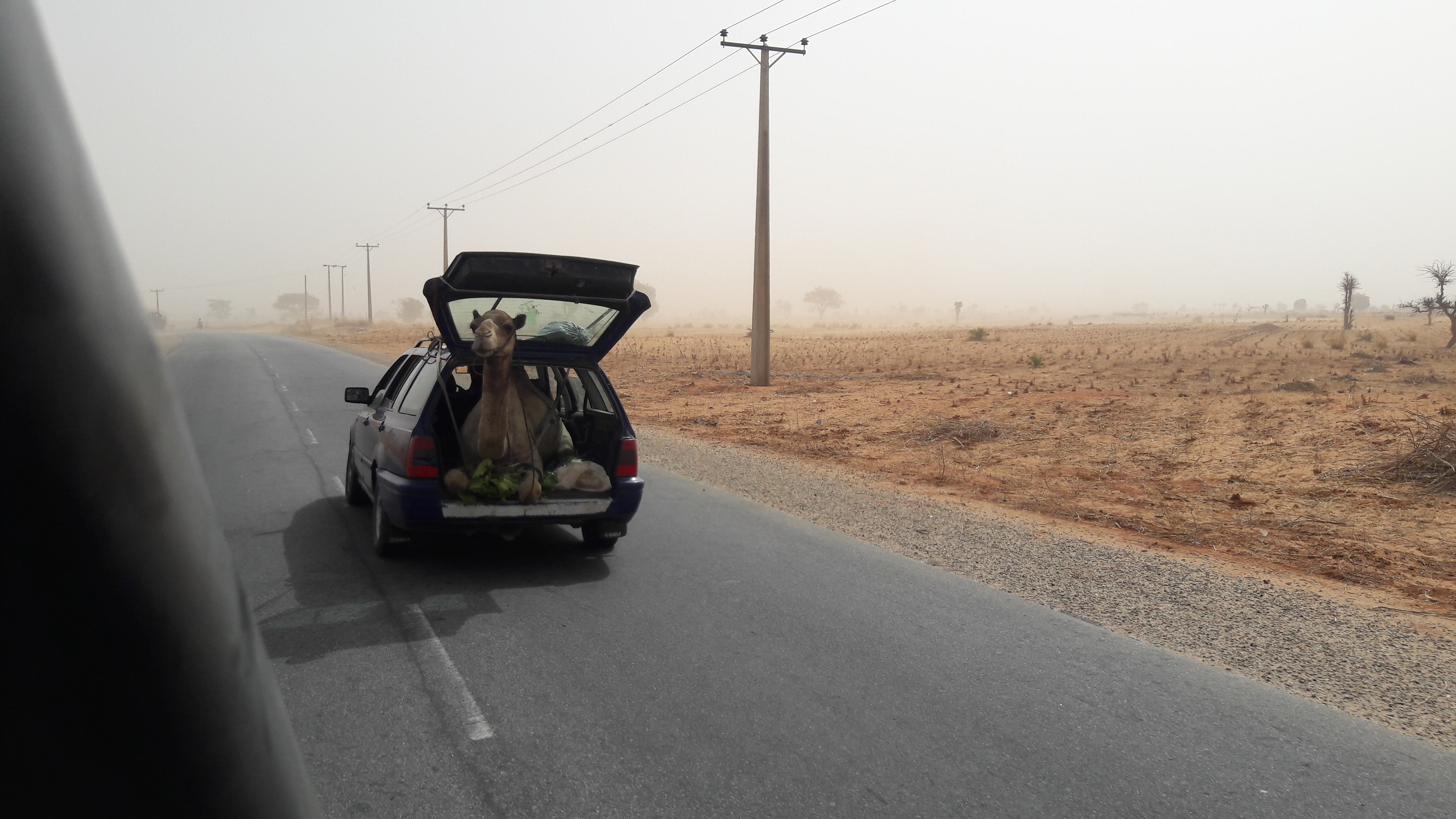
A camel being transported home from a market

Agriculture and gold mining are the state's main occupations and the central source of income. Irrigation is required for cereals and legumes, hence the slogan "farming is our pride".

Over 80 percent of the population is engaged in agriculture. Major products include millet, guinea corn, maize, rice, groundnut, cotton, tobacco and beans. The State is known as farming is our pride because Agriculture provides foodstuffs, raw materials and employment opportunities for young people in the State.

The state is one of the poorest in Nigeria and has one of the highest incidences of extreme poverty (over 60% of the population) according to World Bank data from 2018.

== Natural resources ==
Zamfara state has many natural resources, some are:

- Iron ore
- Gold
- Chromate
- Granite
- Clay
- Limestone
- chamovita
- Quartz
- Kaolin

== Education ==
Tertiary institutions in Zamfara state include:

- Federal Polytechnic, Kaura-Namoda
- Federal University Gusau
- Zamfara State College Of Education, Maru
- Zamfara State University

== Healthcare ==
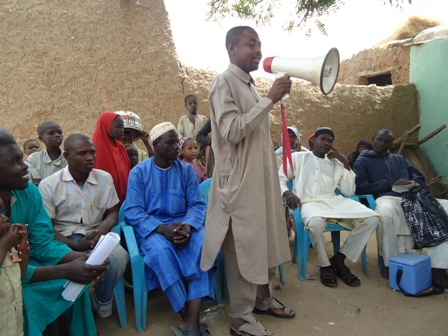
Polio in Gusau zamfara state.

Zamfara state has many healthcare centres and hospitals, some of them are:

- Arewa hospital
- Daula hospital and maternity home
- Farida general hospital
- Rama hospital
- Gusau medical clinic
- Nasiha clinic
- Federal medical centre Gusau

== Transport ==
=== Federal Highways ===
A126 northwest from Katsina State near Kutcheri as the Gusau Rd via Tsafe, Unguwar Audu, Gusau, Bungundu, Kabai, and Talata Mafara to Sokoto State at Bimasa as the Sokoto-Gusau Rd.

=== Other major roads ===
- the Katsina-Gusau Rd north from Gusau via Kaura Namoda to Katsina State as the Jibiya-Zurmi-Barakeji Rd at Gidan Baure,
- the Kaura Namoda-Shinkafi Rd north from Kaura Namoda to Sokoto State at Kwanar Isa as the Shinkafi-Kafi Rd,
- the Dansadau Rd south from Gusau to Dan Sadau where the road continues west to Kebbi State at Kaboro,
- the Anka-Malichi Rd west from A126 at Malinchi to Anka where the Gayawa-Anka Rd continues to Gayawa, where the Gummi-Gayawa Rd continues to Sokoto State at Tashar-Bundun,
- the Zuru-Mahuta Rd south from Gayawa via Zugu to Kebbi State near Sakke.

=== Railways ===
Gusau is connected with the 1067 mm Cape Gauge Western Line by the 245 km Zaria-Kaura Namoda branch line.

=== Airports ===
- Gusau Airstrip

== Incidents ==
In 2009, gold mining became a greater source of income in Zamfara State as worldwide gold prices rose drastically. High concentrations of Lead in the ore from which gold was being extracted led to a Lead poisoning outbreak in the state, requiring national and international intervention to remediate affected areas and provide medical care to children with severe Lead poisoning.

=== Bandit attacks ===
Zamfara is known to experience several recent attacks from bandits. Some among them are:

On 26 February 2021, 279 girls were abducted from their boarding school located in Jangebe, Zamfara during the Zamfara kidnapping. They have since been released.

On 11–12 June 2021, motorcycle-riding bandits killed over 53 villagers, mostly farmers.

On 4–6 January 2022, over 200 people were killed by bandits in Zamfara State.

== Religion ==
Islam is the principal and major religion of the state. Christianity also has many adherents. The original native religions also remain but they have the fewest followers. These religions are mainly practiced in ancient settlements like Dutsi and Kwatarkwashi. Zamfara was the first state in Nigeria to introduce Sharia law during the tenure of Ahmad Sani Yerima, the former Governor of the state.

== Tourism ==
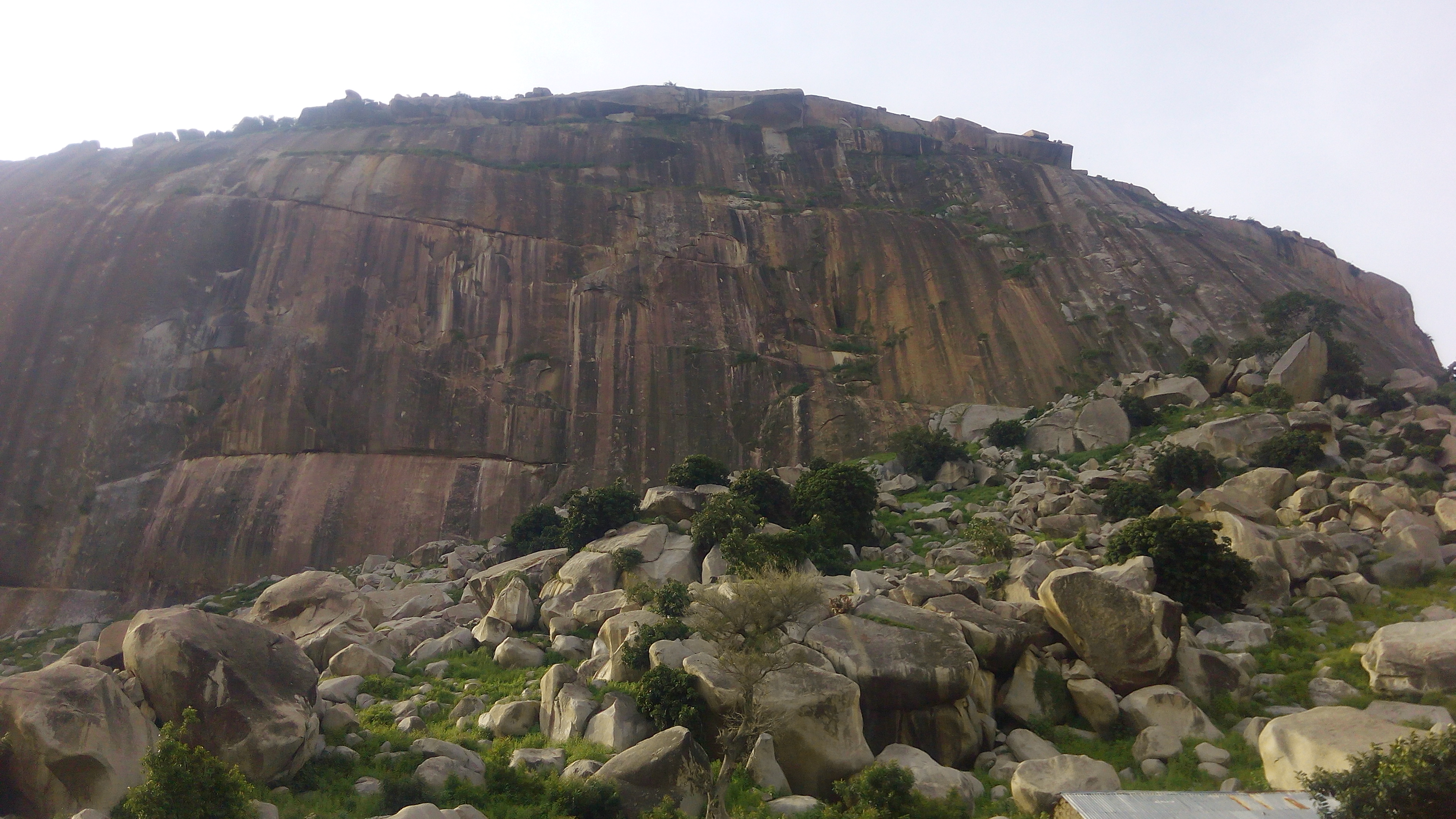
Mount Kwatarkwashi

Zamfara State holds some number of tourist attractions which are of historical or religious importance. These include Jata, an ancient settlement of Zamfara located around the hill with a large cave around where traditional practices were performed.

== Notable people ==
- Kabir Garba politician
- Tijjani Yahaya Kaura politician
- Aishatu Madawaki politician
- Bello Matawalle Former Governor
- Mahmud Shinkafi former Governor
- Abdul'aziz Abubakar Yari
- Ahmad Sani Yerima Senator

== Politics ==
The state government is led by a democratically elected governor who works closely with members of the state house of assembly. The capital city of the state is Gusau.
