= 2023 Nigerian Senate elections in Zamfara State =

2023 Senate elections in Zamfara

← 2019	25 February 2023	2027 →

All 3 Zamfara State seats in the Senate of Nigeria
	Majority party	Minority party
Party	APC	PDP
Last election	0	3
Seats before	2	0
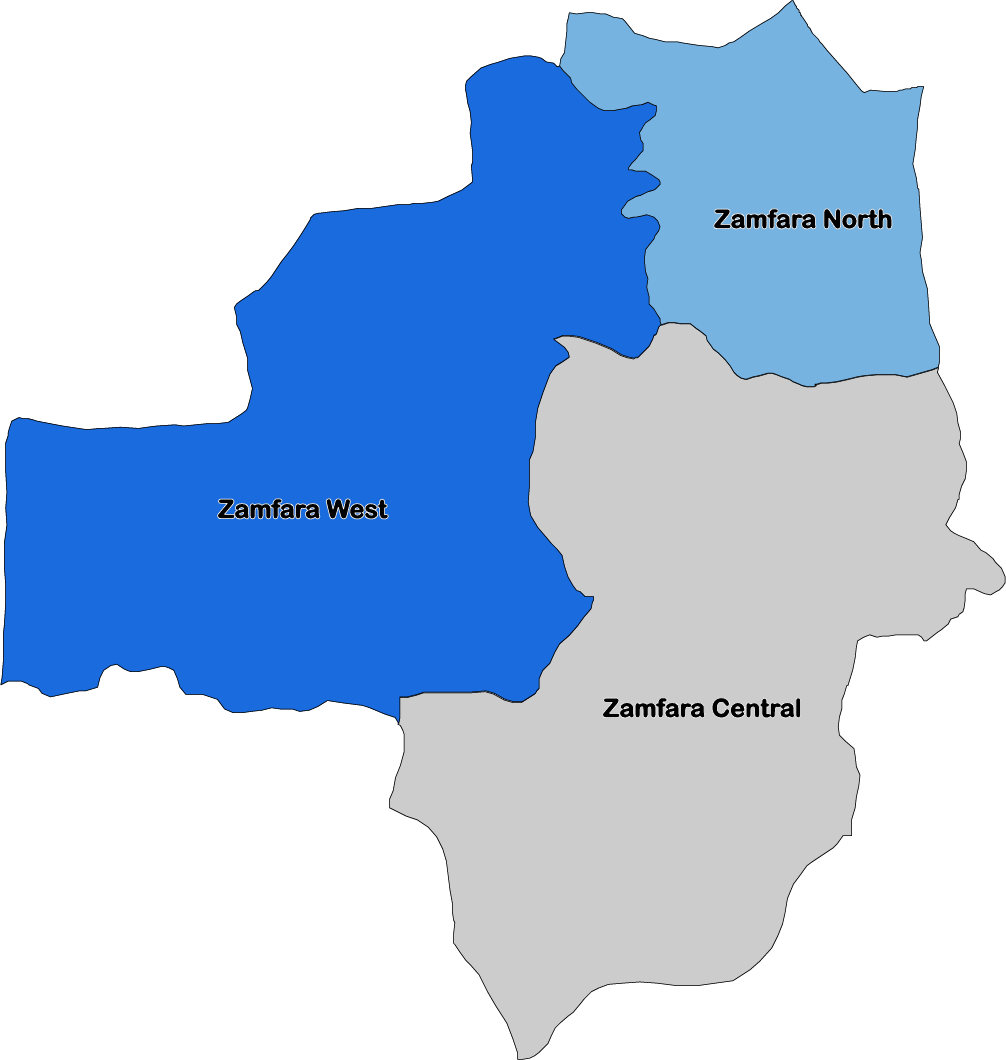
- APC incumbent retiring APC incumbent running for re-election Vacant

The 2023 Nigerian Senate elections in Zamfara State will be held on 25 February 2023, to elect the 3 federal Senators from Zamfara State, one from each of the state's three senatorial districts. The elections will coincide with the 2023 presidential election, as well as other elections to the Senate and elections to the House of Representatives; with state elections being held two weeks later. Primaries were held between 4 April and 9 June 2022.

== Background ==
In the previous Senate elections, none of the three incumbent senators were returned as Kabir Garba Marafa (APC-Central) and Ahmad Sani Yerima (APC-North) retired while Tijjani Yahaya Kaura (APC-West) was disqualified alongside all other Zamfara APC nominees. With the disqualification, PDP runners-up—Hassan Muhammed Gusau (Central), Sahabi Alhaji Yaú (North), and Lawali Hassan Anka (West)—were declared victors by court ruling. The ruling also overturned APC victories in the gubernatorial, House of Representatives, and House of Assembly elections before awarding those offices to the PDP runners-up.

== Overview ==
Affiliation	Party			Total
Affiliation	PDP	APC	Vacant	Total
Previous Election	3	0	0	3
Before Election	0	2	1 (Note: The seat of Zamfara Central is vacant due to the February 2022 resignation of Senator Hassan Muhammed Gusau.)	3
After Election	TBD	TBD	TBD	3

== Summary ==
District	Incumbent		Results	
District	Incumbent	Party	Status	Candidates
Zamfara Central	Vacant		New member electedPDP gain	▌Kabir Garba Marafa (APC); ▌ ✓ Ikira Aliyu Bilbis (PDP)
Zamfara North	Sahabi Alhaji Yaú	APC (Note: This senator was elected as a member of the PDP but switched to the APC during their term.)	Incumbent re-elected	▌ ✓ Sahabi Alhaji Yaú (APC); ▌Bala Mande (PDP)
Zamfara West	Lawali Hassan Anka	APC (Note: This senator was elected as a member of the PDP but switched to the APC during their term.)	Incumbent retired New member elected APC hold	▌ ✓ Abdul'aziz Abubakar Yari (APC); ▌Muhammed Bello Sarkin-Fagon (PDP)

== Zamfara Central ==
2023 Zamfara Central Senatorial District election
← 2019	25 February 2023	2027 →
Nominee	Kabir Garba Marafa	Ikira Aliyu Bilbis
Party	APC	PDP
Senator before election
Vacant
Elected Senator
TBD

The Zamfara Central Senatorial District covers the local government areas of Bungudu, Gusau, Maru, and Tsafe. The seat is vacant as Senator Hassan Muhammed Gusau (APC), who was elected in 2019 as a member of the PDP, resigned from the Senate on 23 February 2022 to become Deputy Governor of Zamfara State.

=== General election ===
==== Results ====
2023 Zamfara Central Senatorial District election
Party	Candidate	Votes	%
AA	Bello Atiku Gusau		
ADP	Samira Abdullahi		
APP	Buhari Isah		
ADC	Nuhu Garba Tunau		
APC	Kabir Garba Marafa		
APGA	Jamilu Abdulkadir		
LP	Sani Yusuf		
NRM	Nura Muhammad Abbas		
New Nigeria Peoples Party	Umar Yuguda Gusau		
PDP	Ikira Aliyu Bilbis		
SDP	Madawaki Isah Ibrahim		
Total votes			100.00%
Invalid or blank votes			N/A
Turnout			

== Zamfara North ==
2023 Zamfara North Senatorial District election
← 2019	25 February 2023	2027 →
Nominee	Sahabi Alhaji Yaú	Bala Mande
Party	APC	PDP
Senator before election
Sahabi Alhaji Yaú
APC
Elected Senator
TBD

The Zamfara North Senatorial District covers the local government areas of Birnin Magaji/Kiyaw, Kaura Namoda, Shinkafi, Talata Mafara, and Zurmi. Incumbent Sahabi Alhaji Yaú (APC), who was elected in 2019 as a member of the PDP, is seeking re-election.

=== General election ===
==== Results ====
2023 Zamfara North Senatorial District election
Party	Candidate	Votes	%
AA	Ibrahim Idris		
ADP	Abdulmajid Shehu		
APP	Shamsu Abubakar		
ADC	Kabiru Usman		
APC	Sahabi Alhaji Yaú		
APGA	Aminu Abdullahi		
LP	Yakubu Adamu		
NRM	Muhammad Mansur Alinakura		
New Nigeria Peoples Party	Son-Allah Abubakar Ibrahim		
PDP	Bala Mande		
SDP	Usman Abdullahi		
Total votes			100.00%
Invalid or blank votes			N/A
Turnout			

== Zamfara West ==
2023 Zamfara West Senatorial District election
← 2019	25 February 2023	2027 →
Nominee	Abdul'aziz Abubakar Yari	Muhammed Bello Sarkin-Fagon
Party	APC	PDP
Senator before election
Lawali Hassan Anka
APC
Elected Senator
TBD

The Zamfara West Senatorial District covers the local government areas of Anka, Bakura, Bukkuyum, Gummi, and Maradun. Incumbent Lawali Hassan Anka (APC), who was elected in 2019 as a member of the PDP, is opted not to seek re-election.

=== General election ===
==== Results ====
2023 Zamfara West Senatorial District election
Party	Candidate	Votes	%
A	[[]]		
AA	Bello Muhammed		
ADP	Suleiman Lawwali		
ADC	Ibrahim Musa Anka		
APC	Abdul'aziz Abubakar Yari	147,346	
APGA	Nazibu Saleh		
LP	Yahaya Aliyu		
New Nigeria Peoples Party	Abdulmalik Adamu	363	
PDP	Muhammed Bello Sarkin-Fagon	5,583	
SDP	Umar Muhammad Gummi		
YPP	Ibrahim Aliyu		
Total votes			100.00%
Invalid or blank votes			N/A
Turnout			

== See also ==
- 2023 Nigerian Senate election
- 2023 Nigerian elections
- 2023 Zamfara State elections
