= Yahaya =

Yahaya is a masculine given name and surname of Arabic origin. It is a variant of the name Yahya. Notable people with the name include:

== Given name ==
- Yahaya Abdulkarim (born 1944), Nigerian politician
- Yahaya Abubakar Abdullahi (born 1950), Nigerian politician
- Yahaya Zakari Abdullahi, Nigerian academic
- Yahaya Abubakar (born 1952), Nigerian traditional ruler
- Yahaya Adamu (born 1993), Nigerian footballer
- Yahaya Baba Adamu, Nigerian surgeon
- Yahaya Ahmad (1947–1997), Malaysian businessman
- Yahaya Ali (born 1959), Malaysian politician
- Yahaya Bello (born 1975), Nigerian politician and businessman
- Yahaya Chado, Nigerian politician
- Yahaya Dikko, Nigerian engineer
- Yahaya Abdul Hamid (born 1945), Malaysian politician
- Yahaya Kuta (born 1962), Nigerian academic, writer, and professor
- Yahaya Madawaki (1907–1998), Nigerian politician and traditional ruler
- Yahaya Ibrahim Masussuka (1979–2026), Nigerian Islamic preacher and religious teacher
- Yahaya Médard (born 2000), Comorian footballer
- Yahaya Mohammed (born 1988), Ghanaian footballer
- Yahaya Mat Nor, Malaysian politician
- Yahaya Seidu (born 1945), Ghanaian politician

== Surname ==
- Abdoulaye Yahaya (born 2001), Cameroonian footballer
- Ahmad Yahaya (born 1975), Malaysian politician
- Dahiru Yahaya (1947–2021), Nigerian historian and academic
- Dominic Yahaya (born 1950), Nigerian traditional ruler
- Faruk Yahaya (born 1966), Nigerian Army officer
- Hilmi Yahaya (born 1948), Malaysian politician
- Innocent Mahamadu Yahaya (1954–2000), Ghanaian politician
- Kabiru Yahaya, Nigerian politician
- Kadir Yahaya (born 1968), Singaporean footballer
- Khalil Yahaya (born 1979), Malaysian politician
- Mallam Yahaya (born 1974), Ghanaian footballer
- Maryam Yahaya (born 1997), Nigerian actress
- Mohd Hisamudin Yahaya (born 1972), Malaysian politician
- Moses Amadu Yahaya (born 1952), Ghanaian politician and building technician
- Moussa Yahaya (born 1975), Nigerian footballer
- Muhammad Inuwa Yahaya (born 1961), Nigerian politician
- Musa Yahaya (born 1997), Nigerian footballer
- Muslimin Yahaya (born 1967), Malaysian politician
- Mustapha Yahaya (born 1994), Ghanaian footballer
- Seidu Yahaya (born 1989), Ghanaian footballer
- Shabudin Yahaya (born 1965), Malaysian politician
- Shukri Yahaya (born 1988), Malaysian actor and model
- Siti Berenee Yahaya, Malaysian politician
- Timothy Yahaya (born 1967), Nigerian Anglican bishop

== See also ==
- Sir Yahaya Memorial Hospital in Nigeria
