= 2007 Zamfara State gubernatorial election =

2007 gubernatorial election in Zamfara State, Nigeria

- April 14, 2007
Nominee	Mahmud Shinkafi	Yahaya Abdulkarim
Party	ANPP	PDP
Running mate	Muntari Anka
Popular vote	415,455	122,351
Governor before election
Ahmad Sani Yerima
ANPP
Elected Governor
Mahmud Shinkafi
ANPP

The 2007 Zamfara State gubernatorial election occurred on April 14, 2007. ANPP candidate Mahmud Shinkafi won the election, defeating PDP Yahaya Abdulkarim and other candidates.

== Results ==
Mahmud Shinkafi from the ANPP won the election. He defeated Yahaya Abdulkarim of the PDP and others.

The total number of registered voters in the state was 1,330,572.

- Mahmud Shinkafi, (ANPP)- 415,455
- Yahaya Abdulkarim, PDP- 218,302
- Lawali Shuaibu, DPP- 73,625
