= 1999 Zamfara State gubernatorial election =

1999 gubernatorial election in Zamfara State, Nigeria

- January 9, 1999
Nominee	Ahmad Sani Yerima	Yushau Anka
Party	All People's Party (Nigeria)	PDP
Running mate	Mahmud Shinkafi
Popular vote	265,529	161,904
Governor before election
Jibril Yakubu
Military
Elected Governor
Ahmad Sani Yerima
All People's Party (Nigeria)

The 1999 Zamfara State gubernatorial election occurred on January 9, 1999. APP candidate Ahmad Sani Yerima won the election, defeating PDP candidate.

== Results ==
Ahmad Sani Yerima from the APP won the election. PDP and AD candidates contested in the election.

The total number of registered voters in the state was 1,113,426, total votes cast was 475,296, valid votes was 431,375 and rejected votes was 43,921.

- Ahmad Sani Yerima, (APP)- 265,529
- PDP- 161,904
- AD- 3,942
