= 2019 Nigerian Senate elections in Zamfara State =

2019 Nigerian Senate election in Zamfara State

The 2019 Nigerian Senate election in Zamfara State was held on February 23, 2019, to elect members of the Nigerian Senate to represent Zamfara State. Abdul'aziz Abubakar Yari representing Zamfara West, Aliyu Ikra Bilbis representing Zamfara Central and Tijjani Yahaya Kaura representing Zamfara North all won on the platform of All Progressives Congress. But the Supreme Court of Nigeria on 24 May 2019 sacked all the candidates of the All Progressives Congress that won elections in Zamfara State and said that candidates of parties with the highest number of valid votes cast with the required spread stands elected. Lawali Hassan Anka representing Zamfara West, Hassan Muhammed Gusau representing Zamfara Central and Sahabi Alhaji Yaú representing Zamfara North all on the platform of Peoples Democratic Party replaced the sacked senators.

== Overview ==
Affiliation	Party		Total
Affiliation	APC	PDP	Total
Before Election	3	0	3
After Election	0	3	3

== Summary ==
District	Incumbent	Party	Elected Senator	Party
Zamfara West	Ahmad Sani Yerima	APC	Lawali Hassan Anka	PDP
Zamfara Central	Kabir Garba Marafa	APC	Hassan Muhammed Gusau	PDP
Zamfara North	Tijjani Yahaya Kaura	APC	Sahabi Alhaji Yaú	PDP

== Results ==
=== Zamfara West ===
A total of 23 candidates registered with the Independent National Electoral Commission to contest in the election. APC candidate Abdul'aziz Abubakar Yari won the election, defeating PDP Lawali Hassan Anka and 21 other party candidates. But the Supreme Court of Nigeria sacked the APC candidate and replaced him with the PDP candidate as the rightful winner.

2019 Nigerian Senate election in Zamfara State
Party	Candidate	Votes	%
APC	Abdul'aziz Abubakar Yari	153,626	
PDP	Lawali Hassan Anka	69,293	
Others		21,532	
Total votes		244,451	
APC hold			

=== Zamfara Central ===
A total of 29 candidates registered with the Independent National Electoral Commission to contest in the election. APC candidate Ikra Aliyu Bilbis won the election, defeating PDP Hassan Muhammed Gusau and 27 other party candidates. But the Supreme Court of Nigeria sacked the APC candidate and replaced him with the PDP candidate as the rightful winner.

2019 Nigerian Senate election in Zamfara State
Party	Candidate	Votes	%
APC	Aliyu Ikra Bilbisu	74,792	
PDP	Hassan Muhammed Gusau	54,859	
Others		59,638	
Total votes		189,289	
APC hold			

=== Zamfara North ===
A total of 22 candidates registered with the Independent National Electoral Commission to contest in the election. APC candidate Tijjani Yahaya Kaura won the election, defeating PDP Sahabi Alhaji Yaú and 20 other party candidates. But the Supreme Court of Nigeria sacked the APC candidate and replaced him with the PDP candidate as the rightful winner.

2019 Nigerian Senate election in Zamfara State
Party	Candidate	Votes	%
PDP	Tijjani Yahaya Kaura	68,027	
APC	Sahabi Alhaji Yaú	43,521	
Others		11,413	
Total votes		122,961	
APC hold			
