= Balik Pulau (federal constituency) =

Malaysian federal constituency

Balik Pulau (P053)
Penang constituency

Federal constituency
- Legislature: Dewan Rakyat
- MP: Muhammad Bakhtiar Wan Chik; PH
- Constituency created: 1974
- First contested: 1974
- Last contested: 2022

Demographics
- Population (2020): 132,344
- Electors (2023): 81,519
- Area (km²): 147
- Pop. density (per km²): 900.3

Balik Pulau is a federal constituency in Southwest Penang Island District, Penang, Malaysia, that has been represented in the Dewan Rakyat since 1974.

The federal constituency was created in the 1974 redistribution and is mandated to return a single member to the Dewan Rakyat under the first past the post voting system.

== Demographics ==
Ethnic breakdown of Balik Pulau's electorate as of 2022
1. Malay (65.3%)
2. Chinese (29.0%)
3. Indian (4.80%)
4. Other ethnicities (0.90%)

As of 2020, Balik Pulau has a population of 132,344 people.

Age breakdown of Balik Pulau's electorate as of 2022
1. 18-20 (5.49%)
2. 21-29 (19.0%)
3. 30-39 (21.4%)
4. 40-49 (18.3%)
5. 50-59 (15.4%)
6. 60-69 (12.4%)
7. 70-79 (6.01%)
8. 80-89 (1.63%)
9. above 90 (0.24%)
Gender breakdown of Balik Pulau's electorate as of 2022
1. Male (48.6%)
2. Female (51.4%)

== History ==
=== Polling districts ===
According to the federal gazette issued on 18 July 2023, the Balik Pulau constituency is divided into 22 polling districts.

State constituency	Polling districts	Code	Location
Bayan Lepas (N38)	Taman Sungai Ara	053/38/01	SJK (C) Chong Cheng
Bayan Lepas (N38)	Bayan Lepas	053/38/02	SK Bayan Lepas; SMJK Heng Ee Cawangan
Bayan Lepas (N38)	Kampong Seronok	053/38/03	SK Bayan Lepas 2
Bayan Lepas (N38)	Sungai Batu	053/38/04	SMK Teluk Kumbar
Bayan Lepas (N38)	Teluk Kumbar	053/38/05	SK Teluk Kumbar
Bayan Lepas (N38)	Pasir Belanda	053/38/06	SMK Seri Bayu
Bayan Lepas (N38)	Gertak Sanggul	053/38/07	SJK (C) Poi Eng
Bayan Lepas (N38)	Kampung Masjid	053/38/08	SK Seri Bayu
Pulau Betong (N39)	Sungai Kongsi	053/39/01	SK Kongsi
Pulau Betong (N39)	Pondok Upeh	053/39/02	SJK (C) Chong Teik
Pulau Betong (N39)	Balik Pulau	053/39/03	SMJK Sacred Heart
Pulau Betong (N39)	Titi Tras	053/39/04	SK Titi Tras
Pulau Betong (N39)	Sungai Burong	053/39/05	SMK Seri Balik Pulau
Pulau Betong (N39)	Ginting	053/39/06	SK Genting
Pulau Betong (N39)	Pulau Betong	053/39/07	SK Tan Sri Awang Had Salleh
Telok Bahang (N40)	Telok Awak	053/40/01	SJK (C) Eok Hua
Telok Bahang (N40)	Teluk Bahang	053/40/02	SK Teluk Bahang; SMK Teluk Bahang
Telok Bahang (N40)	Sungai Pinang	053/40/03	SK Sungai Pinang
Telok Bahang (N40)	Pantai Acheh	053/40/04	SJK (C) Chin Hwa (Pantai Acheh)
Telok Bahang (N40)	Kuala Sungai Pinang	053/40/05	SJK (C) Yu Chye
Telok Bahang (N40)	Sungai Rusa	053/40/06	SK Sungai Rusa
Telok Bahang (N40)	Jalan Bahru	053/40/07	SK Sungai Korok

=== Representation history ===
Members of Parliament for Balik Pulau
Parliament	No	Years	Member	Party	Vote Share
Constituency created from Penang Selatan and Penang Utara
4th	P040	1974–1978	Shamsuri Md. Salleh (شمسوري مد صالح)	BN (UMNO)	14,686; 61.24%
5th	P040	1978–1982	Shamsuri Md. Salleh (شمسوري مد صالح)	BN (UMNO)	19,362; 62.11%
6th	P040	1982–1986	Shamsuri Md. Salleh (شمسوري مد صالح)	BN (UMNO)	21,879; 57.85%
7th	P048	1986–1990	Mohamad Subky Abdul Raof (محمد سبقي عبدالرؤوف)	BN (UMNO)	17,393; 55.58%
8th	P048	1990–1995	Mohamed Farid Ariffin (محمد فريد عارفين)	BN (UMNO)	24,118; 63.91%
9th	P051	1995–1999	Nungsari Ahmad Radhi (نوڠساري أحمد راضي)	BN (UMNO)	36.714; 84.63%
10th	P051	1999–2004	Mohd. Zain Omar (محمد زين عمر)	BN (UMNO)	27,901; 60.17%
11th	P053	2004–2008	Hilmi Yahaya (حلمي يحيى)	BN (UMNO)	21,114; 72.08%
12th	P053	2008–2013	Mohd Yusmadi Mohd Yusoff (محمد يسمدي محمد يوسف)	PR (PKR)	15,749; 51.15%
13th	P053	2013–2018	Hilmi Yahaya (حلمي يحيى)	BN (UMNO)	22,318; 51.79%
14th	P053	2018–2022	Muhammad Bakhtiar Wan Chik (محمّد بختيار وان چئ)	PH (PKR)	25,471; 51.17%
15th	P053	2022–present	Muhammad Bakhtiar Wan Chik (محمّد بختيار وان چئ)	PH (PKR)	24,564; 38.43%

=== State constituency ===
Parliamentary constituency	State constituency						
Parliamentary constituency	1955–1959*	1959–1974	1974–1986	1986–1995	1995–2004	2004–2018	2018–present
Balik Pulau			Bayan Lepas				
Balik Pulau						Pulau Betong	
Balik Pulau			Sungai Nibong				
Balik Pulau			Telok Bahang				
Balik Pulau				Telok Kumbar			

=== Historical boundaries ===
State Constituency	Area				
State Constituency	1974	1984	1994	2003	2018
Bayan Lepas	Bayan Lepas; Batu Maung; Gertak Sanggul; Pulau Betong; Teluk Tempoyak	Bayan Lepas; Desa Ria; Sungai Ara; Sungai Tiram; Teluk Tempoyak		Bayan Lepas; Gertak Sanggul; Kampung Seronok; Sungai Batu; Teluk Kumbar	
Pulau Betong				Balik Pulau; Kampung Perlis; Pekan Genting; Pondok Upih; Pulau Betong	
Sungai Nibong	Batu Uban; Bayan Baru; Relau; Sungai Ara; Sungai Dua				
Telok Bahang	Balik Pulau; Kuala Jalan Baru; Pekan Genting; Titi Teras; Teluk Bahang	Kuala Jalan Baru; Pantai Acheh; Sungai Rusa; Titi Teras; Teluk Bahang	Kuala Jalan Baru; Pantai Acheh; Pulau Betong; Sungai Rusa; Titi Teras	Kuala Jalan Baru; Kuala Sungai Pinang; Pantai Acheh; Sungai Rusa; Teluk Bahang	
Telok Kumbar		Gertak Sanggul; Pekan Genting; Pondok Upih; Pulau Betong; Teluk Kumbar	Balik Pulau; Bayan Lepas; Kampung Air Terjun; Pekan Genting; Teluk Kumbar		

=== Current state assembly members ===
No.	State Constituency	Member	Coalition (Party)
N38	Bayan Lepas	Azrul Mahathir Aziz	PH (AMANAH)
N39	Pulau Betong	Mohamad Shukor Zakariah	PN (PAS)
N40	Telok Bahang	Muhamad Kasim	PN (BERSATU)

=== Local governments & postcodes ===
No.	State Constituency	Local Government	Postcode
N38	Bayan Lepas	Penang Island City Council	11050 Penang; 11000, 11010, 11020 Balik Pulau; 11900, 11910, 11920, 11950 Bayan Lepas
N39	Pulau Betong	Penang Island City Council	11050 Penang; 11000, 11010, 11020 Balik Pulau; 11900, 11910, 11920, 11950 Bayan Lepas
N40	Telok Bahang	Penang Island City Council	11050 Penang; 11000, 11010, 11020 Balik Pulau; 11900, 11910, 11920, 11950 Bayan Lepas

== Election results ==
Malaysian general election, 2022
Party	Candidate	Votes	%	∆%
PH	Muhammad Bakhtiar Wan Chik	24,564	38.43	▲38.43
PN	Muhammad Harris Idaham Abdul Rashid	22,982	35.96	▲35.96
BN	Shah Headan Ayoob Hussain Shah	15,478	24.22	▼13.96
Independent	Sabaruddin Ahmad	366	0.57	▲0.57
PEJUANG	Fazli Mohammad	341	0.53	▲0.53
Independent	Johny Ch'ng Ewe Gee	180	0.28	▲0.28
Total valid votes		63,911	100.00	
Total rejected ballots		863		
Unreturned ballots		163		
Turnout		64,937	75.98	▼9.60
Registered electors		80,264		
Majority		1,582	2.47	▼10.52
PH hold		Swing		
Source(s) https://lom.agc.gov.my/ilims/upload/portal/akta/outputp/1753273/PUB609%20(2022).pdf https://live.chinapress.com.my/ge15/parliament/PENANG

Malaysian general election, 2018
Party	Candidate	Votes	%	∆%
PKR	Muhammad Bakhtiar Wan Chik	25,471	51.17	▲2.96
BN	Hilmi Yahaya	19,007	38.18	▼13.61
PAS	Muhammad Imran Muhammad Saad	5,298	10.64	▲10.64
Total valid votes		49,776	100.00	
Total rejected ballots		631		
Unreturned ballots		157		
Turnout		50,564	85.58	▼2.60
Registered electors		59,086		
Majority		6,464	12.99	▲9.41
PKR gain from BN		Swing		?
Source(s) "His Majesty's Government Gazette – Notice of Contested Election, Parliament for the State of Penang [P.U. (B) 236/2018]" (PDF). Attorney General's Chambers of Malaysia. 3 May 2018. "Federal Government Gazette – Results of Contested Election and Statements of the Poll after the Official Addition of Votes, Parliamentary Constituencies for the State of Penang [P.U. (B) 310/2018]" (PDF). Attorney General's Chambers of Malaysia. 28 May 2018.

Malaysian general election, 2013
Party	Candidate	Votes	%	∆%
BN	Hilmi Yahaya	22,318	51.79	▲2.94
PKR	Muhammad Bakhtiar Wan Chik	20,779	48.21	▼2.94
Total valid votes		43,097	100.00	
Total rejected ballots		612		
Unreturned ballots		64		
Turnout		43,773	88.18	▲9.24
Registered electors		49,641		
Majority		1,539	3.58	▲1.28
BN gain from PKR		Swing		?
Source(s) "Federal Government Gazette – Notice of Contested Election, Parliament for the State of Penang [P.U. (B) 173/2013]" (PDF). Attorney General's Chambers of Malaysia. 26 April 2013. "Federal Government Gazette – Results of Contested Election and Statements of the Poll after the Official Addition of Votes, Parliamentary Constituencies for the State of Penang [P.U. (B) 214/2013]" (PDF). Attorney General's Chambers of Malaysia. 22 May 2013. Archived from the original (PDF) on 22 March 2019.

Malaysian general election, 2008
Party	Candidate	Votes	%	∆%
PKR	Mohd Yusmadi Mohd Yusoff	15,749	51.15	▲23.23
BN	Norraesah Mohamad	15,041	48.85	▼23.23
Total valid votes		30,790	100.00	
Total rejected ballots		601		
Unreturned ballots		0		
Turnout		31,391	78.94	▲1.54
Registered electors		39,765		
Majority		708	2.30	▼41.86
PKR gain from BN		Swing		?

Malaysian general election, 2004
Party	Candidate	Votes	%	∆%
BN	Hilmi Yahaya	21,114	72.08	▲11.91
PKR	Rohana Ariffin	8,177	27.92	▼11.91
Total valid votes		29,291	100.00	
Total rejected ballots		564		
Unreturned ballots		30		
Turnout		29,885	77.40	▲0.56
Registered electors		38,611		
Majority		12,937	44.16	▲23.82
BN hold		Swing		

Malaysian general election, 1999
Party	Candidate	Votes	%	∆%
BN	Mohd. Zain Omar	27,901	60.17	▼24.46
PKR	Mansor Othman	18,467	39.83	▲39.83
Total valid votes		46,368	100.00	
Total rejected ballots		914		
Unreturned ballots		419		
Turnout		47,701	76.84	▲0.75
Registered electors		62,078		
Majority		9,434	20.34	▼48.92
BN hold		Swing		

Malaysian general election, 1995
Party	Candidate	Votes	%	∆%
BN	Nungsari Ahmad Radhi	36,714	84.63	▲20.72
S46	Yahya Jali	6,668	15.37	▲15.37
Total valid votes		43,382	100.00	
Total rejected ballots		1,429		
Unreturned ballots		117		
Turnout		44,928	76.09	▼0.38
Registered electors		59,045		
Majority		30,046	69.26	▲41.44
BN hold		Swing		

Malaysian general election, 1990
Party	Candidate	Votes	%	∆%
BN	Mohamed Farid Ariffin	24,118	63.91	▲8.33
Parti Rakyat Malaysia	Sanusi Osman	13,620	36.09	▼8.33
Total valid votes		37,738	100.00	
Total rejected ballots		1,043		
Unreturned ballots		0		
Turnout		38,781	76.47	▲5.42
Registered electors		50,680		
Majority		10,498	27.82	▲16.66
BN hold		Swing		

Malaysian general election, 1986
Party	Candidate	Votes	%	∆%
BN	Mohamad Subky Abdul Raof	17,393	55.58	▼2.27
Parti Rakyat Malaysia	Mohideen Abdul Kader	13,901	44.42	▲2.27
Total valid votes		31,294	100.00	
Total rejected ballots		1,061		
Unreturned ballots		0		
Turnout		32,355	71.05	▼3.29
Registered electors		45,541		
Majority		3,492	11.16	▼4.54
BN hold		Swing		

Malaysian general election, 1982
Party	Candidate	Votes	%	∆%
BN	Shamsuri Md. Salleh	21,879	57.85	▼4.26
Parti Rakyat Malaysia	Kassim @ Osman Ahmad	15,944	42.15	▲9.93
Total valid votes		37,823	100.00	
Total rejected ballots		1,193		
Unreturned ballots		0		
Turnout		39,016	74.34	▼1.74
Registered electors		52,485		
Majority		5,935	15.70	▼14.19
BN hold		Swing		

Malaysian general election, 1978
Party	Candidate	Votes	%	∆%
BN	Shamsuri Md. Salleh	19,362	62.11	▲0.87
Parti Rakyat Malaysia	Mohideen Abdul Kader	10,044	32.22	▲14.27
PAS	Hussein Derani	1,766	5.67	▲5.67
Total valid votes		31,172	100.00	
Total rejected ballots		914		
Unreturned ballots		0		
Turnout		32,086	76.08	▼5.29
Registered electors		42,176		
Majority		9,318	29.89	▼13.40
BN hold		Swing		

Malaysian general election, 1974
Party	Candidate	Votes	%
BN	Shamsuri Md. Salleh	14,686	61.24
Parti Rakyat Malaysia	Mohideen Abdul Kader	4,306	17.95
DAP	Wan Hussein Wan Mahmood	3,993	16.65
PEKEMAS	Nor Rashid Pin	998	4.16
Total valid votes		23,983	100.00
Total rejected ballots		1,069	
Unreturned ballots		0	
Turnout		25,052	81.37
Registered electors		30,787	
Majority		10,380	43.29
This was a new constituency created.
