= 2003 Zamfara State gubernatorial election =

Election in Zamfara State, Nigeria

- April 19, 2003
| Nominee | Ahmad Sani Yerima | Bala Mande |
| Party | ANPP | PDP |
| Running mate | Mahmud Shinkafi | Anka Mohammed Sani |
| Popular vote | 829,954 | 210,143 |
Governor before election
Ahmad Sani Yerima
All People's Party (Nigeria)
Elected Governor
Ahmad Sani Yerima
ANPP

The 2003 Zamfara State gubernatorial election occurred on April 19, 2003. ANPP candidate Ahmad Sani Yerima won the election, defeating PDP Bala Mande and 3 other candidates.

== Results ==
Ahmad Sani Yerima from the ANPP won the election. 5 candidates contested in the election.

The total number of registered voters in the state was 1,515,622, total votes cast was 1,099,050, valid votes was 1,047,734 and rejected votes was 51,316.

- Ahmad Sani Yerima, (ANPP)- 829,954
- Bala Mande, PDP- 210,143
- Bello Umar, APGA- 6,790
- Garba Mohammed Gajam, UNPP- 463
- Sahabi Aliyu, NDP- 384
