= 2011 Nigerian Senate elections in Zamfara State =

The 2011 Nigerian Senate election in Zamfara State was held on April 11, 2011, to elect members of the Nigerian Senate to represent Zamfara State. Kabir Garba Marafa representing Zamfara Central won on the platform of All Nigeria Peoples Party, while Sahabi Yau representing Zamfara North and Ahmad Sani Yerima representing Zamfara West both won on the platform of the Peoples Democratic Party.

== Overview ==
Affiliation	Party		Total
Affiliation	ANPP	PDP	Total
Before Election	3	0	3
After Election	1	2	3

== Summary ==
District	Incumbent	Party	Elected Senator	Party
Zamfara Central	Hassan Muhammed Gusau	ANPP	Kabir Garba Marafa	ANPP
Zamfara North	Sahabi Alhaji Yau	ANPP	Sahabi Yau	PDP
Zamfara West	Ahmad Sani Yerima	ANPP	Ahmad Sani Yerima	PDP

== Results ==
=== Zamfara Central ===
All Nigeria Peoples Party candidate Kabir Garba Marafa won the election, defeating People's Democratic Party candidate Ibrahim Shehu and other party candidates.

2011 Nigerian Senate election in Zamfara State
Party	Candidate	Votes	%
ANPP	Kabir Garba Marafa		
PDP	Ibrahim Shehu		
Total votes			
ANPP hold			

=== Zamfara North ===
People's Democratic Party candidate Sahabi Alhaji Yaú won the election, defeating All Nigeria Peoples Party candidate Tijjani Yahaya Kaura and other party candidates.

2011 Nigerian Senate election in Zamfara State
Party	Candidate	Votes	%
PDP	Sahabi Alhaji Yaú		
ANPP	Tijjani Yahaya Kaura		
Total votes			
PDP hold			

=== Zamfara West ===
People's Democratic Party candidate Ahmad Sani Yerima won the election, defeating All Nigeria Peoples Party candidate Bello Matawalle and other party candidates.

2011 Nigerian Senate election in Zamfara State
Party	Candidate	Votes	%
PDP	Ahmad Sani Yerima		
ANPP	Bello Matawalle		
Total votes			
PDP hold			
