= 2015 Nigerian Senate elections in Zamfara State =

2015 Nigerian Senate election in Zamfara State

The 2015 Nigerian Senate election in Zamfara State was held on March 28, 2015, to elect members of the Nigerian Senate to represent Zamfara State. Kabir Garba Marafa representing Zamfara Central, Tijjani Yahaya Kaura representing Zamfara North and Ahmad Sani Yerima representing Zamfara West all won on the platform of All Progressives Congress.

== Overview ==
Affiliation	Party		Total
Affiliation	APC	PDP	Total
Before Election			3
After Election	3	–	3

== Summary ==
District	Incumbent	Party	Elected Senator	Party
Zamfara Central			Kabir Garba Marafa	APC
Zamfara North			Tijjani Yahaya Kaura	APC
Zamfara West			Ahmad Sani Yerima	APC

== Results ==
=== Zamfara Central ===
All Progressives Congress candidate Kabir Garba Marafa won the election, defeating People's Democratic Party candidate Ibrahim Shehu and other party candidates.

2015 Nigerian Senate election in Zamfara State
Party	Candidate	Votes	%
APC	Kabir Garba Marafa		
PDP	Ibrahim Shehu		
Total votes			
APC hold			

=== Zamfara North ===
All Progressives Congress candidate Tijjani Yahaya Kaura won the election, defeating People's Democratic Party candidate Sahabi Alhaji Yaú and other party candidates.

2015 Nigerian Senate election in Zamfara State
Party	Candidate	Votes	%
APC	Tijjani Yahaya Kaura		
PDP	Sahabi Alhaji Yaú		
Total votes			
APC hold			

=== Zamfara West ===
All Progressives Congress candidate Ahmad Sani Yerima won the election, defeating People's Democratic Party candidate Bello Matawalle and other party candidates.

2015 Nigerian Senate election in Zamfara State
Party	Candidate	Votes	%
APC	Ahmad Sani Yerima		
PDP	Bello Matawalle		
Total votes			
APC hold			
