= 2007 Nigerian Senate elections in Zamfara State =

The 2007 Nigerian Senate election in Zamfara State was held on 21 April 2007, to elect members of the Nigerian Senate to represent Zamfara State. Hassan Muhammed Gusau representing Zamfara Central, Sahabi Alhaji Yaú representing Zamfara North and Ahmad Sani Yerima representing Zamfara West all won on the platform of All Nigeria Peoples Party.

== Overview ==
Affiliation	Party		Total
Affiliation	PDP	ANPP	Total
Before Election			3
After Election	0	3	3

== Summary ==
District	Incumbent	Party	Elected Senator	Party
Zamfara Central			Hassan Muhammed Gusau	ANPP
Zamfara West			Ahmad Sani Yerima	ANPP
Zamfara North			Sahabi Alhaji Yaú	ANPP

== Results ==
=== Zamfara Central ===
The election was won by Hassan Muhammed Gusau of the All Nigeria Peoples Party.

2007 Nigerian Senate election in Zamfara State
Party	Candidate	Votes	%
ANPP	Hassan Muhammed Gusau		
Total votes			
ANPP hold			

=== Zamfara West ===
The election was won by Ahmad Sani Yerima of the All Nigeria Peoples Party.

2007 Nigerian Senate election in Zamfara State
Party	Candidate	Votes	%
ANPP	Ahmad Sani Yerima		
Total votes			
ANPP hold			

=== Zamfara North ===
The election was won by Sahabi Alhaji Yaú of the All Nigeria Peoples Party.

2007 Nigerian Senate election in Zamfara State
Party	Candidate	Votes	%
ANPP	Sahabi Alhaji Yaú		
Total votes			
ANPP hold			
