= 2015 Zamfara State gubernatorial election =

- April 11, 2015
Nominee	Abdul'aziz Abubakar Yari	Mamuda Aliyu Shinkafi
Party	APC	PDP
Popular vote	716,964	201,938
Governor before election
Abdul'aziz Abubakar Yari
ANPP
Elected Governor
Abdul'aziz Abubakar Yari
APC

The 2015 Zamfara State gubernatorial election was the 5th gubernatorial election of Zamfara State. Held on April 11, 2015, the All Progressives Congress nominee Abdul'aziz Abubakar Yari won the election, defeating Mamuda Aliyu Shinkafi of the People's Democratic Party.

== APC primary ==
APC candidate, Abdul'aziz Abubakar Yari clinched the party ticket. The APC primary election was held in 2014.

== PDP primary ==
PDP candidate, Mamuda Aliyu Shinkafi clinched the party ticket. The PDP primary election was held in 2014.

== Results ==
A total of 20 candidates contested in the election. Abdul'aziz Abubakar Yari from the All Progressives Congress won the election, defeating Mamuda Aliyu Shinkafi from the People's Democratic Party.

2015 Zamfara State gubernatorial election
Party	Candidate	Votes	%	±%
APC	Abdul'aziz Abubakar Yari	716,964		
PDP	Mamuda Aliyu Shinkafi	201,938		
APC hold				
