= 1999 Nigerian Senate elections in Zamfara State =

1999 Nigerian Senate election in Zamfara State

The 1999 Nigerian Senate election in Zamfara State was held on February 20, 1999, to elect members of the Nigerian Senate to represent Zamfara State. Lawali Shuaibu representing Zamfara North, Saidu Dansadan representing Zamfara Central and Yushau Anka representing Zamfara West all won on the platform of the All Nigeria Peoples Party.

== Overview ==
Affiliation	Party		Total
Affiliation	PDP	ANPP	Total
Before Election			3
After Election	0	3	3

== Summary ==
District	Incumbent	Party	Elected Senator	Party
Zamfara North			Lawali Shuaibu	ANPP
Zamfara Central			Saidu Dansadan	ANPP
Zamfara West			Yushau Anka	ANPP

== Results ==
=== Zamfara North ===
The election was won by Lawali Shuaibu of the All Nigeria Peoples Party.

1999 Nigerian Senate election in Zamfara State
Party	Candidate	Votes	%
ANPP	Lawali Shuaibu		
Total votes			
ANPP hold			

=== Zamfara Central ===
The election was won by Saidu Dansadan of the All Nigeria Peoples Party.

1999 Nigerian Senate election in Zamfara State
Party	Candidate	Votes	%
ANPP	Saidu Dansadan		
Total votes			
ANPP hold			

=== Zamfara West ===
The election was won by Yushau Anka of the All Nigeria Peoples Party.

1999 Nigerian Senate election in Zamfara State
Party	Candidate	Votes	%
ANPP	Yushau Anka		
Total votes			
ANPP hold			
