= Anthony Adegbulugbe =

Nigerian academic

Anthony Olusegun Adegbulugbe

Chancellor, Joseph Ayo Babalola University
- Incumbent
- Assumed office December 8, 2023

Special Adviser to the President on Energy
- In office 2005–2007
- President: Goodluck Jonathan
- Preceded by: Yahaya Dikko
- Succeeded by: Olubukola Arowolo Verheijen

Personal details
- Born: 2 April 1955 (age 71)
- Education: B.Sc. (Hon), D.Sc.
- Alma mater: University of Ife, Massachusetts Institute of Technology
- Occupation: Professor, Energy Planning and Management Specialist
- Known for: Contributions to Nigeria's energy sector

Anthony Olusegun Adegbulugbe is a Nigerian professor of energy planning and management, notable for his significant contributions to Nigeria's energy industry. He is the third chancellor of Joseph Ayo Babalola University and will officially resume office by December 8, 2023. Adegbulugbe served as a special adviser on energy to former president Olusegun Obasanjo of Nigeria. He was a member of the National Economic Management Team, and the chairman of the National Gas to Power initiative between 2005 and 2007. Adegbulugbe was a contributor to the inter-governmental panel on Climate change (IPCC) Assessments reports which won the 2007 Nobel Peace Prize along with former US vice president Al Gore. He has played a crucial role in shaping energy policies in Nigeria.

== Education ==
Adegbulugbe graduated with a B.Sc in electrical engineering from the University of Ife in 1976 with a First Class and Grade Point Average (GPA) of 5.0 on a scale of 5.0. He furthered his education at the Massachusetts Institute of Technology (MIT), where he earned a D.Sc. in nuclear materials engineering with a minor program in energy planning and management in June 1981. He also received certificates in electric system expansion planning and energy planning and management from the Brookhaven National Laboratory in the United States. Additionally, he completed a course on International Gas Business Management offered by the International Human Resources Development Corporation in Boston, Massachusetts in 2006.

== Career ==
Adegbulugbe started his career as a visiting research fellow at the Institut fur Kernenergetik und Energiesyteme in Germany in 1984. He was appointed project director greenhouse gases emission reduction in Nigeria in 1994. He has held various academic positions, including director and professor at the Centre for Energy Research & Development at Obafemi Awolowo University from 1994 to 2010.

In 2005, he was appointed by former president Olusegun Obasanjo as special assistant on energy matters, a position he held until 2007. He served as a senior advisor to the Nigerian Infrastructure Advisory Facility (NIAF) from 2012 to 2013. Adegbulugbe was senior advisor Nigerian Infrastructure Advisory Facility (NIAF) until 2013. In 2014, he became the chairman and CEO of All Grace Energy Limited and Green Energy Limited.

Throughout his career, Adegbulugbe has been actively involved in shaping energy policies and plans for Nigeria. He played a crucial role in designing the Energy Master Plan for Nigeria. Adegbulugbe's professional history includes a range of positions and projects. Adegbulugbe has also been involved in consultancy projects, including the Renewable Energy Masterplan for Nigeria and the evaluation of energy infrastructural needs and the role of the private sector in the oil, gas, and power sectors.

He is a member of prestigious professional bodies, including the Nigerian Society of Engineers (NSE), Knowledge Networks for Sustainable Energy in Africa (KNSEA), the International Association of Energy Economists (IAEE), and the Africa Energy Policy Research Network (AFREPREN).

== Awards and recognitions ==
- Doctorate degree (Honoris Causa) of Afe Babalola University, Ado Ekiti (ABUAD) - 2017
- Best graduating student Obafemi Awolowo University - 1976
- Special Alumni Merit Award - 2003
- Presidential Special Merit Award from the Nigerian Society of Engineers - 1992.
- American Nuclear Society his outstanding research papers in the field of Nuclear Materials.
- African Peace Man of the Year - 2023
- FUPRE Excellence in Leadership and Corporate Integrity Award - 2021
