= Shinkafi (disambiguation) =

Shinkafi is a Local Government Area in Zamfara State, Nigeria.

It is also a surname and may refer to:

- Mahmud Shinkafi, Nigerian politician, governor of Zamfara state, Nigeria from 2007 to 2011
- Mamuda Aliyu Shinkafi, Nigerian politician, governor of Zamfara State in 2007
- Umaru Shinkafi (1937–2016), Nigerian politician, intelligence chief, and Federal Commissioner of Internal Affairs
