= 1991 Sokoto State gubernatorial election =

1991 gubernatorial election in Sokoto State, Nigeria

Sokoto gubernatorial election
- December 14, 1991
Nominee	Yahaya Abdulkarim	Zuberu Maigari
Party	NRC	SDP
Popular vote	485,889	101,729
Governor before election
Garba Nadama
NPN
Elected Governor
Yahaya Abdulkarim
NRC

The 1991 Sokoto State gubernatorial election occurred on December 14, 1991. NRC candidate Yahaya Abdulkarim won the election, defeating SDP Zuberu Maigari.

== Conduct ==
The gubernatorial election was conducted using an open ballot system. Primaries for the two parties to select their flag bearers were conducted on October 19, 1991.

The election occurred on December 14, 1991. NRC candidate Yahaya Abdulkarim won the election, defeating SDP Zuberu Maigari. Yahaya Abdulkarim polled 485,889 votes, while Zuberu Maigari polled 101,729 votes.
