= Mohd Tuah Ismail =

Malaysian politician

Haji Mohd Tuah Ismail
- محمد تواه اسماعيل

Member of the Penang State Legislative Assembly for Pulau Betong
- In office 2018–2023
- Preceded by: Muhamad Farid Saad
- Succeeded by: Mohamad Shukor Zakariah

Personal details
- Born: Mohd Tuah bin Ismail; 9 August 1966 (age 59) Balik Pulau, Penang
- Citizenship: Malaysian
- Party: PKR
- Other political affiliations: Pakatan Rakyat (till 2015); Pakatan Harapan (since 2015)
- Occupation: Politician

Mohd Tuah Ismail is a Malaysian politician from PKR. He was the Member of Penang State Legislative Assembly for Pulau Betong from 2018 to 2023. He is the Deputy Chief of PKR Balik Pulau Division. He was also a member of MAINPP from 2014 to 2021.

== Personal life ==
He was born in Balik Pulau to Ismail Othman and Siti Halijah Mohd Zain on 9 August 1966. Mohd Tuah studied in SK Titi Teras and SMK Seri Balik Pulau before becoming a Bachelor in Islamic Studies from Akademi Islah Malaysia. He is married to Mazilah Ismail and the couple have a son and a daughter.

== Election results ==
Penang State Legislative Assembly
Year	Constituency	Candidate	Votes	Pct.	Opponent(s)	Votes	Pct.	Ballots cast	Majority	Turnout
2013	N39 Pulau Betong	Mohd Tuah Ismail (PKR)	6,457	49.36%	Muhamad Farid Saad (UMNO)	6,852	50.64%	13,532	395	88.40%
2018	N39 Pulau Betong	Mohd Tuah Ismail (PKR)	7,675	49.60%	Muhamad Farid Saad (UMNO)	6,079	39.30%	15,719	1,596	86.50%
2018	N39 Pulau Betong	Mohd Tuah Ismail (PKR)	7,675	49.60%	Muhd Taufik Hashim (PAS)	1,645	10.60%	15,719	1,596	86.50%
2018	N39 Pulau Betong	Mohd Tuah Ismail (PKR)	7,675	49.60%	Yeoh Cheng Huat (PRM)	64	0.50%	15,719	1,596	86.50%
2023	N39 Pulau Betong	Mohd Tuah Ismail (PKR)	8,483	47.10%	Mohamad Shukor Zakariah (PAS)	9,534	52.90%	18,134	1,051	76.07%
