= Abdullahi Ibrahim (military administrator) =

Nigerian military governor

Military Administrator of Nasarawa State
- In office 7 October 1996 – 6 August 1998
- Preceded by: Habibu Idris Shuaibu (Plateau State)
- Succeeded by: Bala Mande

Wing Commander (retired) Abdullahi Ibrahim was the first Military Administrator of Nasarawa State, Nigeria between August 1996 and August 1998 after the state was created from part of Plateau State during the military regime of General Sani Abacha. He established the state's executive council and built the Government House and the state secretariat. In August 1997 he announced that the federal government was going to review decisions of local government election appeal tribunals throughout the country, since there was evidence of corrupt malpractices in these tribunals.
