= Hilmi Yahaya =

Malaysian politician (born 1948)

Yang Berbahagia Dato' Seri Hilmi Yahaya DGPN DMPN
- حلمي يحي

Deputy Minister of Health
- In office 16 May 2013 – 9 May 2018
- Monarchs: Abdul Halim; Muhammad V
- Prime Minister: Najib Razak
- Minister: Subramaniam Sathasivam
- Preceded by: Rosnah Shirlin
- Succeeded by: Lee Boon Chye
- Constituency: Balik Pulau

Member of the Malaysian Parliament for Balik Pulau
- In office 5 May 2013 – 9 May 2018
- Preceded by: Mohd Yusmadi Mohd Yusoff (PR–PKR)
- Succeeded by: Muhammad Bakhtiar Wan Chik (PH–PKR)
- Majority: 1,539 (2013)
- In office 21 March 2004 – 8 March 2008
- Preceded by: Mohd Zain Omar (BN–UMNO)
- Succeeded by: Mohd Yusmadi Mohd Yusoff (PR–PKR)
- Majority: 12,937 (2004)

Member of the Penang State Legislative Assembly for Telok Bahang
- In office 8 March 2008 – 5 May 2013
- Preceded by: Siti Faridah Arshad (BN–UMNO)
- Succeeded by: Shah Haedan Ayoob Hussain Shah (BN–UMNO)
- Majority: 465 (2008)
- In office 21 October 1990 – 21 March 2004
- Preceded by: Yahaya Ahmad (BN–UMNO)
- Succeeded by: Siti Faridah Arshad (BN–UMNO)

Personal details
- Born: 6 March 1948 (age 78) Balik Pulau, Penang, British Military Administration of Malaya (now Malaysia)
- Citizenship: Malaysian
- Party: United Malays National Organisation (UMNO)
- Other political affiliations: Barisan Nasional (BN)
- Spouse: Jamilah Mohd Zain
- Children: 5
- Education: University of Malaya (MBBS)
- Occupation: Politician
- Profession: Doctor

Hilmi bin Yahaya (born 6 March 1948) is a Malaysian politician who had served as Deputy Minister of Health from 2013 to 2018. He is a member of the United Malays National Organisation (UMNO), a component party of the Barisan Nasional (BN) coalition.

== Election results ==
Penang State Legislative Assembly
Year	Constituency	Candidate	Votes	Pct	Opponent(s)	Votes	Pct	Ballots cast	Majority	Turnout
1990	N31 Telok Bahang	Hilmi Yahaya (UMNO)	6,364	61.92%	Sanusi Osman (PRM)	3,913	38.08%	10,541	2,451	75.15%
1995	N33 Telok Bahang	Hilmi Yahaya (UMNO)								
1999	N33 Telok Bahang	Hilmi Yahaya (UMNO)	8,120	61.42%	Johari Kassim (keADILan)	5,101	38.58%	13,528	3,019	75.32%
2008	N40 Telok Bahang	Hilmi Yahaya (UMNO)	4,434	52.77%	Abdul Halim Hussain (PKR)	3,969	47.23%	8,565	465	78.82%

Parliament of Malaysia
Year	Constituency	Candidate	Votes	Pct	Opponent(s)	Votes	Pct	Ballots cast	Majority	Turnout
2004	P053 Balik Pulau	Hilmi Yahaya (UMNO)	21,114	72.08%	Rohana Ariffin (PKR)	8,177	27.92%	29,885	12,937	77.40%
2013	P053 Balik Pulau	Hilmi Yahaya (UMNO)	22,318	51.79%	Muhammad Bakhtiar Wan Chik (PKR)	20,779	48.21%	43,773	1,539	88.18%
2018	P053 Balik Pulau	Hilmi Yahaya (UMNO)	19,007	38.18%	Muhammad Bakhtiar Wan Chik (PKR)	25,471	51.17%	50,564	6,464	85.58%
2018	P053 Balik Pulau	Hilmi Yahaya (UMNO)	19,007	38.18%	Muhd Imran Muhd Saad (PAS)	5,298	10.64%	50,564	6,464	85.58%

== Honours ==
- Penang
  - Commander of the Order of the Defender of State (DGPN) – Dato' Seri (2004)
  - Companion of the Order of the Defender of State (DMPN) – Dato' (1996)
