= Kabiru Yahaya =

Nigerian politician

Kabiru Yahaya is a Nigerian politician. He was a former member of the House of Representatives, representing Talata Mafara/Anka Federal Constituency in Zamfara State. He was succeeded by Mohammed Isa Anka.
