= Yusmadi Yusoff =

Malaysian politician

- محمد يسمدي بن محمد يوسف
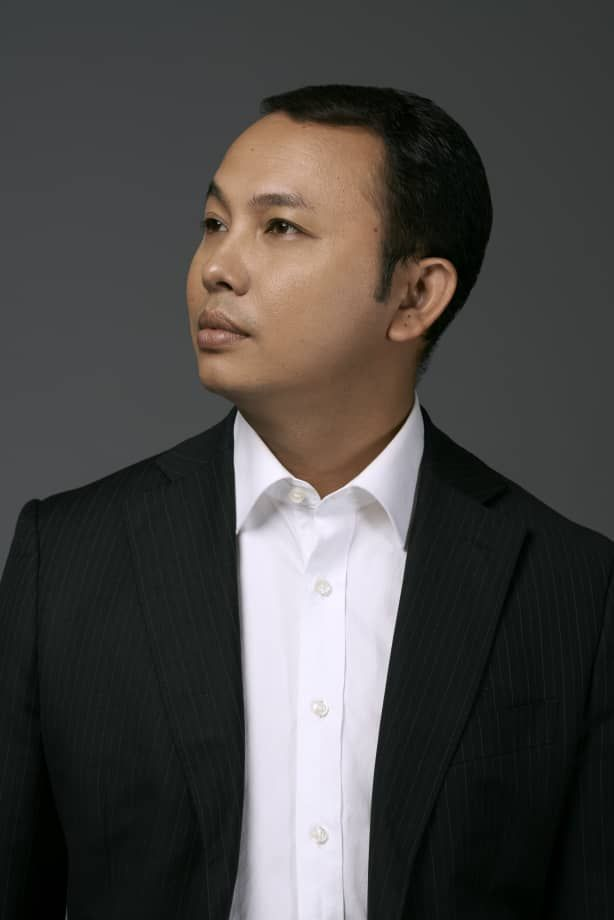

Faction represented in Dewan Rakyat
- 2008–2013: People's Justice Party

Faction represented in Dewan Negara
- 2018–2021: Pakatan Harapan

Personal details
- Born: Mohd Yusmadi bin Mohd Yusoff; 12 October 1974 (age 51) Penang, Malaysia
- Citizenship: Malaysian
- Party: People's Justice Party
- Other political affiliations: Pakatan Harapan
- Education: International Islamic University Malaysia; American University Washington College of Law
- Occupation: Politician
- Profession: Lawyer
- Website: rights.com.my; www.fny.my; yusmadi.com.my

Mohd Yusmadi bin Mohd Yusoff (Jawi: محمد يسمدي بن محمد يوسف; born 12 October 1974) is a Malaysian politician and was the Member of the Parliament of Malaysia for the Balik Pulau constituency in Penang, Malaysia from 2008 to 2013. He sat in Parliament as a member of People's Justice Party (PKR).

Yusmadi now holds an appointment as a Senator in Dewan Negara. the Upper House of Parliament of Malaysia to represent Penang. He was appointed in August 2018.

Yusmadi was appointed a Member of Consultative Council of Foreign Policy (CCFP), Ministry of Foreign Affairs, Malaysia.

Encorp Berhad announced the appointment of Mohd Yusmadi Mohd Yusoff as its new Non-Executive Chairman and Independent Non-Executive Director, effective from 29 September 2023.

Beginning 1 March 2026, Yusmadi was appointed as a Member of the Board of Governors (BOG) of the International Islamic University Malaysia (IIUM) as a representative from a respected institution, body, and entity. The Board of Governors also appointed him as the President of the Pro tem Committee of the IIUM Alumni Ummatic Federation, a global umbrella body for IIUM alumni, effective from 24 February 2026.

== Professional careers ==
=== Senior Partner, Fahda Nur & Yusmadi ===
Yusmadi is a legal practitioner by profession. He specializes in public interest litigation and criminal defense cases. He has been involved as a leading counsel and co-counsel in civil and criminal cases. Some of the cases that were handled by him involved politicians, top singers and activists namely Al-Maunah case, Dato’ Seri Anwar Ibrahim and Rock Band Search, force eviction cases, Reformasi activists. He is also active in defending cases assigned by YBGK (National Legal Aid Foundation). His law firm, Fahda Nur & Yusmadi is a boutique law firm which focuses on civil law, commercial, crime, human rights, public interests and Islamic law.

=== RIGHTS Foundation ===
He established the RIGHTS Foundation. He is the founder and chairman of the non-profit organization RIGHTS Foundation which promotes constructive engagement and interaction on the issues of Governance, Human Rights and Social Justice in the region through forums, seminars, advocacy work, dialogues and publications. RIGHTS focal points consist of The Idea of RIGHTS, The Institution of RIGHTS and RIGHTS Hidden Hands.

== Public service experience ==
=== Parliamentarian ===
Yusmadi was elected as the Member of Parliament for Balik Pulau, Penang during the Malaysia General Election in 2008. He broke the record by winning the seat for the first time ever since 1999 for PKR with the majority of 708 votes against Norraesah Binti Mohamad (UMNO). Nevertheless, during the Malaysia General Election in 2013, he was not contested to focus on his non-profit organizations and human rights activities, as well as to make way for Muhammad Bakhtiar Wan Chik, who was eventually unsuccessful in winning the seat.

During his tenure as the Member of Parliament, he was appointed by Yang di-Pertuan Agong as the Member of the Parliamentary Committee for Anti-Corruption under the umbrella of Malaysian Anti-Corruption Commission (MACC).

=== Fellow at Institute for Policy Research (known as Institut Kajian Dasar (IKD)) ===
He was elected as the fellow for Institute for Policy Research from 2006 until 2008.

== International involvement ==
He was appointed by the Secretary General of Commonwealth to be part of the Commonwealth Election Observation Team for Maldives Presidential Election in 2013. He was one of the Election Observers at Virginia and Maryland during the US Mid Term Election in 2007 organized by the Center for Democracy & Election Management, American University, Washington, D.C.

== Film / documentary ==
Special guest in A Whisper To A Roar in 2009, a collaborative project between Stanford University and Prince Hecham Maulay Foundation.

== The concept of Muafakat (Consensus) ==
Yusmadi is known for his optimistic, objective and positive point of view.

He is a strong believer in the concept of Muafakat (consensus). Quoted from The Star pertaining to his view on the upcoming 2018 PKR Election, he said, "The formula for PKR to be stronger is through Muafakat. To me, Muafakat is not only just about consensus and cooperation but Muafakat is an accord between the concerned stakeholders for a bigger agenda. And the bigger agenda is only one – for PKR to be the most sustainable, leading party for a new government".

== Election results ==
Parliament of Malaysia
Year	Constituency	Candidate	Votes	Pct	Opponent(s)	Votes	Pct	Ballots cast	Majority	Turnout
2008	P053 Balik Pulau	Mohd Yusmadi Mohd Yusoff (PKR)	15,749	50.17%	Norraesah Mohamad (UMNO)	15,041	47.92%	31,391	708	78.94%
