= Lawali Shuaibu =

Nigerian politician (born 1955)

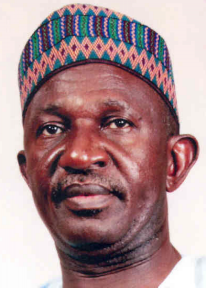

Senator for Zamfara North
- In office 29 May 1999 – 29 May 2007
- Succeeded by: Sahabi Alhaji Yaú

Personal details
- Born: 18 April 1955 (age 71) Kaura Namoda, Northern Region, British Nigeria (now in Zamfara State, Nigeria)
- Party: All Progressives Congress
- Education: HND from Kaduna Polytechnic

Lawali Shuaibu (born 18 April 1955) is a Nigerian politician who was elected senator for the Zamfara North Senatorial District of Zamfara State, Nigeria at the start of the Nigerian Fourth Republic, running on the All People's Party (APP) platform. He took office on 29 May 1999. He was re-elected on the All Nigeria People's Party (ANPP) platform in 2003 to a second term of four years.

== Background ==
Born in April 1955, Shuaibu obtained a Higher National Diploma (HND) in Marketing from Kaduna Polytechnic. He became managing director of the Trans Atlantic Shipping Agency, Apapa, Lagos.

== Senate career ==
After taking his seat in the Senate in June 1999, Shuaibu was appointed to committees on Security & Intelligence, Transport, State & Local Government and Drug & Narcotics (chairman). In August 2002, he was appointed to a three-man panel to investigate allegations that some senators were under instructions from the presidency to offer bribes to other senators so they would abstain from voting to override President Olusegun Obasanjo's veto of the Electoral Bill 2002.

After reelection in 2003, Shuaibiu was appointed chairman of the committee on Drugs & Financial Crimes for the second time and a member of committees on Marine Transport, Sports & Social Developments and National Population. Shuaibiu's committee on Drugs and Financial Crimes overhauled the Economic and Financial Crimes Commission (EFCC) law to bring it into conformity with International standards. He was appointed Senate Minority Leader, and although a friend of senate president Ken Nnamani of the People's Democratic Party (PDP) he was a strong defender of ANPP interests.

In March 2004, Shuaibiu moved to set up an ad hoc committee to trace money received for the sale of government-owned companies, which the committee on appropriations and finance could not locate in any government account. He was a delegate from Nigeria to the United Nations Conference for the 13th session of the Commission on Crime Prevention and Criminal Justice in Vienna, Austria. He was also on the Nigerian delegation to the 11th United Nations Congress on Crime Prevention and Criminal Justice which took place April 2005 in Bangkok, Thailand. Later in the year, Shuaibu was a member of the Nigerian delegation led by Senate President Ken Nnamani, that attended the United Nations Parliamentary Conference at the United Nations Headquarters in New York on 10 September 2005. Shuaibiu was a leading member of the "2007 Movement" which successfully fought the proposal to amend the constitution so President Olusegun Obasanjo could run for a third term. In February 2007, he was appointed chairman of a Senate Ad Hoc Committee investigating the list of politicians indicted by the EFCC to determine if President Obasanjo had doctored the EFCC advisory list, directing which politicians should be targeted. In March 2007, he said the list had been doctored but that Obasanjo had the authority to do so, although this was morally wrong.

== Party politics ==
In November 2005, the Zamfara ANPP suspended Shuaibiu citing anti-party activities and gross violation of the ANPP constitution. In February 2006, the ANPP National Executive Committee ratified this decision. Shuaibiu was governorship candidate of the breakaway Democratic People's Party in Zamfara State in the 2007 elections. Mahmud Aliyu Shinkafi of the ANPP won with 415,455 votes and Yahaya Abdulkarim of the PDP won 122,351, while Shuaibu came third with 73,652 votes.

In February 2009, President Umaru Yar'Adua appointed him a member of the National Universities Commission. President Goodluck Jonathan appointed Senator Lawal Shuaibu as a member of a Task Force to accelerate the passage of the Petroleum Industry Bill in the National Assembly but he declined the offer. He explained he was busy with Party work at the time and he did not believe in the integrity of Government in the proposed assignment. In January 2010, as a member of the opposition coalition the National Democratic Movement (NDM), he was part of a delegation that visited Senate President David Mark to propose forming a 15-man team to visit the ailing President Yar'Adua in Saudi Arabia. He was one of the leaders of the NDM involved in the debate over whether it should form a new "mega party" to present a consolidated opposition to the PDP.

After the failed amalgamation of the different political groups in the National Democratic Movement (NDM), Shuaibu registered as a member of the Action Congress of Nigeria (ACN), on 12 October 2010. At the National Convention of the Party in Benin City on 21 December 2010, Shuaibu contested and became the National Secretary of the ACN.

On 30 January 2013, Shuaibu was appointed a member of the Merger Committee in which ACN along with other Parties like ANPP and Congress for Progressive Change (CPC) agreed to merge their Parties to become one mega Party; and he was subsequently appointed by the National Executive Committee of ACN as the Chairman of the ACN Special Convention Committee at which event on 18 April 2013 in Lagos, the Action Congress of Nigeria formally resolved to merge with the major opposition parties in Nigeria for the purpose of confronting the ruling Party in Nigeria and take power in 2015 General Elections. He delivered a welcome address in which he gave a background of the event. on 13 June 2014 Shuaibu was elected the APC Deputy National Chairman, North at the first National Convention of the Party. Senator Shuaibu as the APC Party Leader in the North, convened a meeting of all Stakeholders from Northern Nigeria in Kaduna on 18 October 2014, with former Head of State General Muhammadu Buhari, former Vice President Atiku Abubakar and the Northern Governors and Senators in attendance. He warned them to unite if they are serious on their aspirations to win the 2015 Presidential elections.
