= Zolkifly Mohd Lazim =

Malaysian politician

Haji Zolkifly Mohd Lazim
- ذولكيفلي محمد لازيم
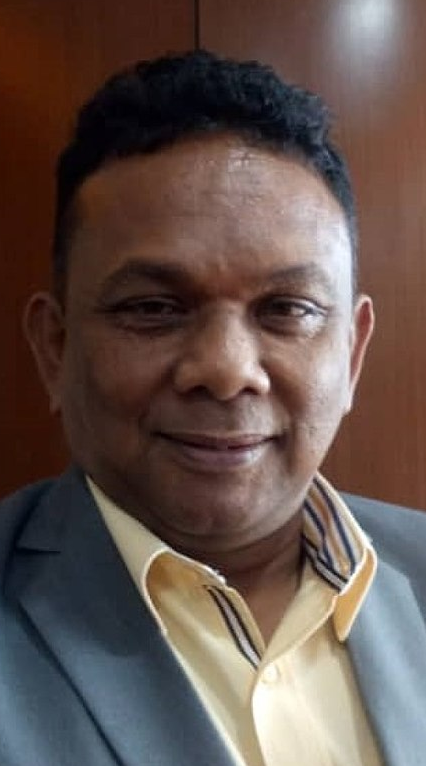

Member of the Penang State Legislative Assembly for Telok Bahang
- In office 2018–2023
- Preceded by: Shah Haedan Ayoob Hussain Shah
- Succeeded by: Muhamad Kasim

Personal details
- Born: Zolkifly bin Mohd Lazim; 13 November 1964 (age 61)
- Citizenship: Malaysian
- Party: PAS (till 2018); BERSATU (since 2018)
- Other political affiliations: Pakatan Harapan (2018-2020); Perikatan Nasional (since 2020)
- Spouse: Rosnah Abu Hassan
- Occupation: Politician

Zolkifly bin Mohd Lazim is a Malaysian politician from BERSATU. He was the Member of Penang State Legislative Assembly for Telok Bahang from 2018 to 2023.

== Politics ==
He was a member of PAS and PASMA, and was appointed as the Chairman of PASMA Penang before joining BERSATU. He is also the Chief of BERSATU Telok Bahang and Balik Pulau branch.

== Election results ==
Penang State Legislative Assembly
Year	Constituency	Candidate	Votes	Pct.	Opponent(s)	Votes	Pct.	Ballots cast	Majority	Turnout
2018	N40 Telok Bahang	Zolkifly Mohd Lazim (BERSATU)	5,482	44.82%	Shah Haedan Ayoob Hussain Shah (UMNO)	5,057	41.35%	12,231	425	85.30%
2018	N40 Telok Bahang	Zolkifly Mohd Lazim (BERSATU)	5,482	44.82%	Mohd Ali Othman (PAS)	1,469	12.01%	12,231	425	85.30%
