= Federal Medical Centre, Keffi =

Federal Medical Centre in Nigeria

Geography
- Location: Keffi, Nasarawa State, Nigeria

Links
- Website: www.fmckeffi.gov.ng
- Lists: Hospitals in Nigeria

Federal Medical Centre, Keffi is a federal government of Nigeria medical centre located in Keffi, Nasarawa State, Nigeria. The current chief medical director is Yahaya Baba Adamu.

== History ==
Federal Medical Centre, Keffi was established in 1957. The hospital was formerly known as General Hospital, Keffi.

== CMD ==
The current chief medical director is Yahaya Baba Adamu.

== Departments ==
Department of surgery

Department of Nursing

Department of Radiology

Department of NHIS

Department of internal medicine

Department of orthopedic

Department of Ophthalmology

Department of Family Medicine

Department of internal medicine Department of Anaesthesia Department of Psychiatry Department of ORL & HN Surgery

Department of medical laboratory

Department of paedratics

== Signing of MoU with NHIA ==
Federal medical center keffi in Nassarawa state sign a memorandum of understanding with National health insurance Authority to provide free caesarean to poor and vulnerable woman in the country and Nassarawa state.
