= Olubukola Arowolo Verheijen =

Nigerian energy executive and public policy adviser

Olu Arowolo Verheijen
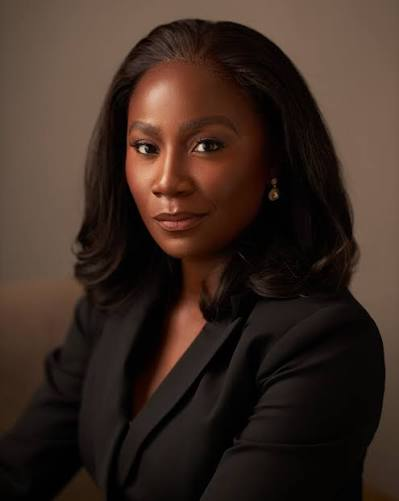

Special Adviser to the President on Oil and Gas
- Incumbent
- Assumed office 2025
- President: Bola Tinubu
- Preceded by: Redesignation

Special Adviser to the President on Energy
- In office 2023–2025
- President: Bola Tinubu
- Preceded by: Anthony Adegbulugbe

Personal details
- Born: Olubukola Arowolo Verheijen Ondo State, Nigeria
- Education: Long Island University (BA); Harvard University (MPP)
- Occupation: Energy executive, investor, public policy adviser
- Known for: Energy policy, investment, petroleum and gas sector reforms

Olubukola Arowolo Verheijen (commonly known as Olu Arowolo Verheijen), is a Nigerian energy executive, investor, public policy advisor. She is currently a Special Adviser to the President of Nigeria. She was appointed by President Bola Tinubu as Special Adviser on Energy in June 2023 and later in 2025 redesignated as Special Adviser to the President on Oil and Gas. She sat on the Advisory Council of the United States Millennium Challenge Corporation (MCC), from 2020 to 2024. She also serves as an Advisor to the Energy for Growth Hub, a global energy policy think tank.

== Early life and education ==
Verheijen was born into the Arowolo family, which has roots in Ondo State in south-western Nigeria. She spent her childhood in the former Ondo State before the creation of Ekiti State in 1996, growing up between Akure and Ado-Ekiti. She is the daughter of Nigerian pharmacist and administrator, Ifejola Arowolo.

She attended colleges in the United States where she graduated with a Bachelor of Arts in Economics and Political Science from Long Island University, New York. She continued her studies in the John F. Kennedy School of Government at Harvard University in Cambridge, Massachusetts, completing a Master of Public Policy (MPP) between 2003 and 2005.

== Career ==
Upon graduation, Verheijen has had a career that span international finance, the petroleum industry, and renewable-energy investment and advisory services. She has held a combination of commercial, financial and governance roles in both the public and private sector, specialising in investment, energy markets, infrastructure development and public policy, particularly in Sub-Saharan Africa. She is a former employee of Moody's Investors Service, Shell, Persistent Energy and Latimer Energy.

Verheijen began her career as a Senior Associate, working in the Public Finance Department at Moody's Investors Service in New York.

In 2006, She joined Shell as a Commercial Adviser. She had an eleven year career at Shell working in various commercial, strategy and corporate roles. In 2015 became a Deal Lead.

As Deal Lead, she was responsible for negotiating multi-billion-dollar M&A deals and worked on oil and gas sales, transportation and storage arrangements. She was also involved with Nigeria's first World Bank Partial Risk Guarantee to ensure secure payments for long term gas supply contracts in domestic gas to government-owned power plants.

After leaving Shell, Verheijen joined Persistent Energy, an Africa focused climate venture builder which invests in early-stage clean energy entrepreneurs. She worked as Partner and Chair of the Investment Committee, investing in distributed renewable-energy businesses throughout Africa, especially commercial and industrial power and off-grid in underserved areas.

She led the Investment Committee responsible for evaluating, structuring and managing investments in renewable-energy companies throughout Africa.

During her time at Persistent Energy she led investment in Daystar Power, the leading renewable energy solutions provider to C&I across West Africa. Daystar will later be acquired by Shell and will be their first power acquisition on the continent.

After leaving Persistent Energy, Verheijen founded Latimer Energy, an advisory firm specialising in commercial and strategic advisory services for governments, investors and energy companies operating across Africa, where she served as Managing Director.

== Advisory roles ==
Verheijen has been an Entrepreneur in Residence, Advisory Board Member and Senior Adviser to Energy for Growth Hub, a global non profit think tank and research group aiming to eliminate energy poverty and create high energy climate resilient future for emerging economies, primarily in Africa and Asia.

From 2020 to 2024, she served two consecutive terms on the Advisory Council of the United States Millennium Challenge Corporation (MCC) alongside Nadia Schadlow, Daniel FitzGerald Runde, Stephen Groff, and Tariye Gbadegesin.

Beyond international policy institutions, Verheijen has served on the Board of Trustees of the Harvard Kennedy School Alumni Association of Nigeria, supporting initiatives aimed at strengthening professional networks, leadership development and public policy engagement among graduates of the Harvard Kennedy School.

== Government service ==
=== Appointment as Special Adviser to the President ===
On 15 June 2023, President Bola Tinubu announced the appointment of Verheijen as Special Adviser to the President on Energy. She was tasked with coordinating presidential priorities across Nigeria's multiple energy organizations: Ministry of Petroleum Resources, Ministry of Power, Nigerian Upstream Petroleum Regulatory Commission (NUPRC), Nigerian Midstream and Downstream Petroleum Regulatory Authority (NMDPRA), Nigerian National Petroleum Company Limited (NNPC Ltd.), development partners and other public institutions involved in energy policy. In 2025, the Presidency redesignated her position as Special Adviser to the President on Energy (Oil and Gas).

=== Energy reforms ===
Under Verheijen's leadership, a 2023–2026 energy-sector review released by the Presidency reported that approximately US$10 billion in upstream and midstream investments had been secured, with more than US$50 billion in additional upstream projects remaining in the investment pipeline. She manages two Presidential programmes, namely, the Presidential Metering Initiative (PMI) and the Presidential Power Sector Debt Reduction Programme (PPSDRP), aimed at enhancing the financial sustainability of the electricity sector and the private sector investment therein.

Verheijen is also a board member of the Presidential Compressed Natural Gas (CNG) and Electric Vehicle (EV) Initiative. In 2026, she headed a technical subcommittee set up by President Tinubu to create guidelines for the direct remittance of Profit Oil, Royalty Oil and Tax Oil into the Federation Account, pursuant to Executive Order No. 9 of 2026.

== Public speaking engagements ==
Verheijen has given keynote speeches and participated in panels on energy, investment and infrastructure funding. These include CERAWeek by S&P Global, African Energy Week, the Abu Dhabi International Petroleum Exhibition and Conference (ADIPEC), the Gas Investment Forum, the Africa Soft Power Summit, and Energy Council events among many others.

She has generally spoken on energy investment, financing, natural gas, electricity, energy transition in Africa, and private sector investment in infrastructure. She has also participated in policy dialogues organised by governments, business groups and investment organisations on the commercial and regulatory environment for energy investment in Africa.

== Awards, honours and publications ==
Verheijen has received professional, industry and leadership recognition for her contributions to energy policy, infrastructure investment and public service.

=== Selected awards and honours ===
- Fellow of the Energy Institute (FEI)
- Ascent Top 100 African Leaders
- Special Exemplary Leadership Award, Gas Investment Forum (2025)
- Woman in Leadership of the Year, Nigeria Oil & Gas (NOG) Energy Week Awards (2026)

=== Selected publications ===
Verheijen has written policy papers on natural gas, electricity access, and energy investment. Since entering public service, she has developed a wider body of published speeches, lectures, and essays on Nigeria’s energy reforms, industrialisation, and economic development. These include:

- "Energy in Nigeria: From potential to reality," BusinessDay.
- "The Age of Nigerian Ambition," DailyCircular.
- "The future of energy: Shaping the workforce of tomorrow," TheCable
- "Energy In Nigeria: Tinubu’s reforms and the push from potential to reality," TheGuardian
- "Should lower-income countries build open cycle or combined cycle gas turbines?" with Mark Thurber, Energy for Growth Hub
- "Grid investment and gas-fired power at the heart of Nigeria’s economic transformation and energy transition," Energy for Growth Hub

== See also ==
- Energy in Nigeria
- Petroleum industry in Nigeria
- Bola Tinubu
- Nigerian National Petroleum Company
- Nigerian Upstream Petroleum Regulatory Commission
