= Pulau Betong (state constituency) =

State constituency in Penang, Malaysia

Pulau Betong (N39)
Penang constituency
- Pulau Betong (olive) on Penang Island

State constituency
- Legislature: Penang State Legislative Assembly
MLA
Mohamad Shukor Zakariah
PN
- Constituency created: 2004
- First contested: 2004
- Last contested: 2023

Demographics
- Electors (2023): 23,838
- Area (km²): 44

Pulau Betong is a state constituency in Penang, Malaysia, that has been represented in the Penang State Legislative Assembly since 2004. It covers a part of the western half of Penang Island that includes the town of Balik Pulau.

The state constituency was first contested in 2004 and is mandated to return a single Assemblyman to the Penang State Legislative Assembly under the first-past-the-post voting system. Since 2023, the State Assemblyman for Pulau Betong is Mohamad Shukor Zakariah from PAS.

== Definition ==
=== Polling districts ===
According to the federal gazette issued on 30 March 2018, the Pulau Betong constituency is divided into 7 polling districts.

State constituency	Polling districts	Code	Location
Pulau Betong (N39)	Sungai Kongsi	053/39/01	SK Kongsi
Pulau Betong (N39)	Pondok Upeh	053/39/02	SJK (C) Chong Teik
Pulau Betong (N39)	Balik Pulau	053/39/03	SMK St George
Pulau Betong (N39)	Titi Tras	053/39/04	SK Titi Tras
Pulau Betong (N39)	Sungai Burong	053/39/05	SMK Seri Balik Pulau
Pulau Betong (N39)	Ginting	053/39/06	SK Genting
Pulau Betong (N39)	Pulau Betong	053/39/07	SK Tan Sri Awang Had Salleh

It encompasses a significant portion of the southwestern coast of Penang Island, covering Balik Pulau, the seat of the Southwest Penang Island District, and its surrounding villages.

The constituency is named after the eponymous Betong Island (under the Pulau Betong polling district), an islet off the southwestern coast of Penang Island.

== Demographics ==
Ethnic breakdown of Pulau Betong's electorate as of 2023
1. Malay (66.3%)
2. Chinese (28.4%)
3. Indian (4.27%)
4. Other ethnicities (1.00%)

Total electors by polling district in 2016
Polling district	Electors
Balik Pulau	2,084
Pondok Upeh	1,937
Sungai Kongsi	2,647
Titi Tras	2,093
Ginting	2,717
Sungai Burong	1,638
Pulau Betong	2,479
Total	15,595
Source: Malaysian Election Commission

== History ==
Penang State Legislative Assemblyman for Pulau Betong
Assembly	No	Years	Member	Party
Constituency created from Telok Kumbar and Telok Bahang
11th	N39	2004 – 2008	Muhamad Farid Saad	BN (UMNO)
12th	N39	2008 – 2013	Muhamad Farid Saad	BN (UMNO)
13th	N39	2013 – 2018	Muhamad Farid Saad	BN (UMNO)
14th	N39	2018 – 2023	Mohd Tuah Ismail	PH (PKR)
15th	N39	2023–present	Mohamad Shukor Zakariah	PN (PAS)

== Election results ==
The electoral results for the Pulau Betong state constituency are as follows.

Penang state election, 2023
Party	Candidate	Votes	%	∆%
PN	Mohamad Shukor Zakariah	9,534	52.90	▲52.90
PH	Mohd Tuah Ismail	8,483	47.10	▼2.50
Total valid votes		18,017	100.00	
Total rejected ballots		97		
Unreturned ballots		20		
Turnout		18,134	76.07	▼10.43
Registered electors		23,838		
Majority		1,051	5.80	▼4.50
PN gain from PH		Swing		?
Source(s) https://undi.info/seat/PN.N.PULAU_BETONG

Penang state election, 2018
Party	Candidate	Votes	%	∆%
PKR	Mohd Tuah Ismail	7,675	49.60	▲0.24
BN	Muhamad Farid Saad	6,079	39.30	▼11.34
PAS	Muhd Taufik Hashim	1,645	10.60	▲10.60
Parti Rakyat Malaysia	Yeoh Cheng Huat	64	0.50	▲0.50
Total valid votes		15,463	100.00	
Total rejected ballots		220		
Unreturned ballots		36		
Turnout		15,719	86.50	▼1.90
Registered electors		18,177		
Majority		1,596	10.30	▲9.02
PKR gain from BN		Swing		?
Source(s) "His Majesty's Government Gazette - Notice of Contested Election, State Legislative Assembly for the State of Penang [P.U. (B) 252/2018]" (PDF). Attorney General's Chambers of Malaysia. 3 May 2018. "Federal Government Gazette - Results of Contested Election and Statements of the Poll after the Official Addition of Votes, State Constituencies for the State of Penang [P.U. (B) 326/2018]" (PDF). Attorney General's Chambers of Malaysia. 28 May 2018. Archived from the original (PDF) on 29 August 2019.

Penang state election, 2013
Party	Candidate	Votes	%	∆%
BN	Muhamad Farid Saad	6,852	50.64	▼0.88
PKR	Mohd Tuah Ismail	6,457	49.36	▲0.88
Total valid votes		13,309	100.00	
Total rejected ballots		200		
Unreturned ballots		23		
Turnout		13,532	88.40	▲7.50
Registered electors		15,316		
Majority		395	1.28	▼1.76
BN hold		Swing		
Source(s) "Federal Government Gazette - Notice of Contested Election, State Legislative Assembly for the State of Penang [P.U. (B) 189/2013]" (PDF). Attorney General's Chambers of Malaysia. 26 April 2013. "Federal Government Gazette - Results of Contested Election and Statements of the Poll after the Official Addition of Votes, State Constituencies for the State of Penang [P.U. (B) 230/2013]" (PDF). Attorney General's Chambers of Malaysia. 22 May 2013. Archived from the original (PDF) on 22 March 2019.

Penang state election, 2008
Party	Candidate	Votes	%	∆%
BN	Muhamad Farid Saad	4,990	51.52	▼20.00
PKR	Mansor Othman	4,696	48.48	▲20.00
Total valid votes		9,686	100.00	
Total rejected ballots		160		
Unreturned ballots		1		
Turnout		9,847	80.90	▲3.63
Registered electors		12,170		
Majority		294	3.04	▼40.00
BN hold		Swing		

Penang state election, 2004
Party	Candidate	Votes	%
BN	Muhamad Farid Saad	6,586	71.52
PKR	Zainudin Haniff	2,622	28.48
Total valid votes		9,208	100.00
Total rejected ballots		162	
Unreturned ballots		12	
Turnout		9,382	77.27
Registered electors		12,142	
Majority		3,964	43.04
This was a new constituency created.

== See also ==
- Constituencies of Penang
