= Yahaya Baba Adamu =

Nigerian surgeon and chief medical director

Dr. Yahaya Baba Adamu
- Citizenship: Nigeria
- Education: University of Jos
- Occupation: Cardio-thoracic surgeon

Yahaya Baba Adamu is a Nigerian cardio thoracic surgeon. He is currently the Chief Medical Director of Federal Medical Center, Keffi. He assumed office in July 2018 and was reappointed in 2022 for another term by President Muhammadu Buhari.

== Early life and career ==
Yahaya Adamu is an alumnus of the University of Jos where he bagged a Bachelor of Medicine and Surgery (MBBS) degree in 1994. He proceeded to the Ahmadu Bello University Teaching Hospital, Zaria from 1996 to 1999 for his general surgery residency program. He joined the National Hospital Abuja as a surgeon in 2003.

Since his appointment as chief medical director, he has established various systems that promote global health including disease prevention, treatment and control.
