= Jibril Yakubu =

Nigerian governor and colonel

Jibril Bala Yakubu

Governor of Zamfara State
- In office 7 October 1996 – May 1999
- Preceded by: Rasheed Adisa Raji (Sokoto State)
- Succeeded by: Ahmad Sani Yerima

Colonel Jibril Bala Yakubu was the first Administrator of Zamfara State after it was created from part of Sokoto State in October 1996, holding office until the return to democracy in May 1999 during the military regimes of Generals Sani Abacha and Abdulsalami Abubakar. As Zamfara administrator, Yakubu created five Emirates in the state and eleven new District Councils. After handing over to the civilian governor Ahmed Sani Yerima in May 1999, as a former military administrator he was required to retire from the army.

== Biography ==
Yakubu was arrested and jailed based on a charge filed on 9 December 1999 that alleged that he conspired with four others in 1996 to assassinate Alex Ibru, the publisher of The Guardian newspaper. As Commanding Officer of 29 Battalion, he allegedly supplied arms to killer squads who eliminated other opponents of General Sani Abacha. In December 2003 a judge refused his request to stop the trial. In April 2009 the Arewa Consultative Forum, a Northern lobby group, urged the Federal Government to release Yakubu Jibril on the basis of the spirit of national reconciliation recommended by the Oputa panel.

Eventually, after 12 years of imprisonment, trials and retrials, Yakubu and his co-defendants were acquitted of most charges on 21 December 2010. The co-defendants were former Chief Security Officer Hamza al-Mustapha, former Lagos State Police Commissioner James Danbaba and former head of the Aso Rock Anti-Riot Police Rabo Lawal.
