= Muhammad Bakhtiar Wan Chik =

Malaysian politician

Yang Berhormat Dato' Muhammad Bakhtiar Wan Chik DSPN MP
- محمد بختيار بن وان چيق

Deputy Minister of Tourism, Arts and Culture
- In office 2 July 2018 – 24 February 2020
- Monarchs: Muhammad V (2018–2019); Abdullah (2019–2020)
- Prime Minister: Mahathir Mohamad
- Minister: Mohammadin Ketapi
- Preceded by: Mas Ermieyati Samsudin (Deputy Minister of Tourism and Culture)
- Succeeded by: Jeffrey Kitingan
- Constituency: Balik Pulau

Member of the Malaysian Parliament for Balik Pulau
- Incumbent
- Assumed office 9 May 2018
- Preceded by: Hilmi Yahaya (BN–UMNO)
- Majority: 6,464 (2018); 1,582 (2022)

Faction represented in Dewan Rakyat
- 2018–: Pakatan Harapan

Personal details
- Born: Muhammad Bakhtiar bin Wan Chik; 22 May 1965 (age 60) Penang, Malaysia
- Citizenship: Malaysian
- Party: People's Justice Party (PKR)
- Other political affiliations: Pakatan Harapan (PH); Pakatan Rakyat (PR)
- Education: Penang Free School
- Alma mater: University of Arizona, Tucson (Bachelor of Administrative Science)

Muhammad Bakhtiar bin Wan Chik (Jawi: محمد بختيار بن وان چيق; born 22 May 1965) is a Malaysian politician who has served as the Member of Parliament (MP) for Balik Pulau since May 2018. He served as the Deputy Minister of Tourism, Arts and Culture in the Pakatan Harapan (PH) administration under former Prime Minister Mahathir Mohamad and former Minister Mohammadin Ketapi from July 2018 to the collapse of the PH administration in February 2020. He is a member of the People's Justice Party (PKR), a component party of the PH coalition.

== Election results ==
Parliament of Malaysia
Year	Constituency	Candidate	Votes	Pct	Opponent(s)	Votes	Pct	Ballots cast	Majority	Turnout
2013	P053 Balik Pulau	Muhammad Bakhtiar Wan Chik (PKR)	20,779	48.21%	Hilmi Yahaya (UMNO)	22,318	51.79%	43,773	1,539	88.18%
2018	P053 Balik Pulau	Muhammad Bakhtiar Wan Chik (PKR)	25,471	51.17%	Hilmi Yahaya (UMNO)	19,007	38.18%	50,564	6,464	85.58%
2018	P053 Balik Pulau	Muhammad Bakhtiar Wan Chik (PKR)	25,471	51.17%	Muhd Imran Muhd Saad (PAS)	5,298	10.64%	50,564	6,464	85.58%
2022	P053 Balik Pulau	Muhammad Bakhtiar Wan Chik (PKR)	24,564	38.43%	Muhammad Harris Idaham Abdul Rashid (BERSATU)	22,982	35.96%	63,911	1,582	79.63%
2022	P053 Balik Pulau	Muhammad Bakhtiar Wan Chik (PKR)	24,564	38.43%	Shah Headan Ayoob Hussain Shah (UMNO)	15,478	24.22%	63,911	1,582	79.63%
2022	P053 Balik Pulau	Muhammad Bakhtiar Wan Chik (PKR)	24,564	38.43%	Fazli Mohammad (PEJUANG)	341	0.53%	63,911	1,582	79.63%
2022	P053 Balik Pulau	Muhammad Bakhtiar Wan Chik (PKR)	24,564	38.43%	Johnny Ch'ng Ewe Gee (IND)	180	0.28%	63,911	1,582	79.63%
2022	P053 Balik Pulau	Muhammad Bakhtiar Wan Chik (PKR)	24,564	38.43%	Sabaruddin Ahmad (IND)	366	0.57%	63,911	1,582	79.63%

== Honours ==
=== Honours of Malaysia ===
- Malaysia
  - Recipient of the 17th Yang di-Pertuan Agong Installation Medal (2024)
- Penang
  - Officer of the Order of the Defender of State (DSPN) – Dato' (2021)
