= Muhamad Kasim =

Malaysian politician

Yang Berhormat Tuan Muhamad Kasim MLA
- محمد قاسم

Member of the Penang State Legislative Assembly for Telok Bahang
- Incumbent
- Assumed office 12 August 2023
- Preceded by: Zolkifly Mohd Lazim (PN–BERSATU)
- Majority: 944 (2023)

Personal details
- Born: Muhamad bin Kasim (1961)
- Citizenship: Malaysia
- Party: Malaysian United Indigenous Party (BERSATU)
- Other political affiliations: Perikatan Nasional
- Occupation: Politician

Muhamad bin Kasim is a Malaysian politician who served as Member of Penang State Legislative Assembly (MLA) for Telok Bahang since 2023. He is a member of the Malaysian United Indigenous Party (BERSATU), a component party of Perikatan Nasional (PN). He is also a retired colonel.

== Election results ==
Penang State Legislative Assembly
Year	Constituency	Candidate	Votes	Pct.	Opponent(s)	Votes	Pct.	Ballots cast	Majority	Turnout
2023	N40 Telok Bahang	Muhamad Kasim (BERSATU)	7,245	53.08%	Ahmad Zaki Shah Shah Headan (UMNO)	6,301	46.17%	13,648	944	76.13%
