= Mohamad Shukor Zakariah =

Malaysian politician

Yang Berhormat Tuan Mohamad Shukor Zakariah MLA
- محمد شكور زكريا

Member of the Penang State Legislative Assembly for Pulau Betong
- Incumbent
- Assumed office 12 August 2023
- Preceded by: Mohd Tuah Ismail (PH–PKR)
- Majority: 1,051 (2023)

Personal details
- Born: Mohamad Shukor bin Zakariah
- Citizenship: Malaysia
- Party: Malaysian Islamic Party (PAS)
- Other political affiliations: Perikatan Nasional
- Occupation: Politician

Mohamad Shukor bin Zakariah is a Malaysian politician who served as Member of Penang State Legislative Assembly for Pulau Betong since 2023. He is a member of the Malaysian Islamic Party (PAS), a component party of Perikatan Nasional (PN).

== Election results ==
Penang State Legislative Assembly
Year	Constituency	Candidate	Votes	Pct.	Opponent(s)	Votes	Pct.	Ballots cast	Majority	Turnout
2023	N39 Pulau Betong	Mohamad Shukor Zakariah (PAS)	9,534	52.58%	Mohd Tuah Ismail (PKR)	8,483	46.78%	18,134	1,051	76.07%
