= Bala Mande =

Nigerian soldier and politician

Bala Mohammed Mande

Federal Minister of Environment
- In office July 2003 – June 2005
- Preceded by: Hassan Adamu
- Succeeded by: Iyorchia Ayu

Military Administrator of Nasarawa State
- In office 6 August 1998 – 29 May 1999
- Preceded by: Abdullahi Ibrahim
- Succeeded by: Abdullahi Adamu

Personal details
- Born: 1958 (age 67–68)

Military service
- Allegiance: Nigeria
- Branch: Nigerian Army

Colonel Bala Mohammed Mande is a former Military Administrator of Nasarawa State. He was later appointed Minister of Environment in the Cabinet of President Olusegun Obasanjo.

== Early career ==
Bala Mande hails from Zamfara State. He was appointed Military Administrator of Nasarawa State from June 1998 to May 1999 during the transitional regime of General Abdulsalami Abubakar, handing over to the elected Governor Abdullahi Adamu on the return to democracy. He was a harsh critic of governor Ahmad Rufai Sani for his implementation of Sharia law in the 2000–2003 period, which he felt was being used to punish political opponents, with the spoils going to Sani's ANPP supporters. He was the People's Democratic Party candidate for governorship of Zamfara State in 2003, but lost to the incumbent Ahmad Sani of the All Nigeria People's Party (ANPP).

== Minister of Environment ==
Mande was appointed Minister of the Environment in the Cabinet of President Olusegun Obasanjo in July 2003, holding office until June 2005. In September 2003, he signed an agreement with Cameroon's Minister of Environment and Forestry Chief Tanyi-Mbianyor Clarkson for a transboundary protected area combining the Takamanda and Okwangwo reserves to protect the Cross River gorilla, the world's rarest subspecies of gorilla with only 280 individuals throughout its entire range.

In October 2003, he proposed a national conference on the environment as the only solution to the desperate and varied environmental degradation which were compounded by years of neglect. The same month, he said the Lake Chad River Basin Commission would be rejuvenated to tackle the environmental problems of that region. The federal government would return the Chad Basin area to its past glory when it offered water for agricultural activities, as well as supporting tourism. He said his ministry would provide all the technical experts the commission might require executing the commission's projects. He announced approval by UN's Global Environment Fund (GEF) World Bank of a $10 million developmental fund.

In Autumn 2003, Mande said the British American Tobacco Nigeria Foundation had collaborated with the Ministry "in the quest for sustainable management and conservation of our forest resources". The foundation had committed to provide 100,000 seedlings annually in a national tree planting exercise, and to provide materials and technical support to ensure best practices in environmental protection.

== Later career ==
Mande failed to secure PDP's governorship nomination for Zamfara in the 2007 elections, but was appointed one of the campaign coordinators for the Umaru Yar'Adua/Goodluck Jonathan ticket. In February 2010, as National Secretary of the Northern Union (NU), Mande declared that the union had never at any point in time advised ailing President Umaru Yar'Adua to hang on to power, even from a wheelchair.
