= Telok Bahang =

State constituency in Penang, Malaysia

Telok Bahang (N40)
Penang constituency
- Telok Bahang (olive) on Penang Island

State constituency
- Legislature: Penang State Legislative Assembly
MLA
Muhamad Kasim
PN
- Constituency created: 1974
- First contested: 1974
- Last contested: 2023

Demographics
- Electors (2023): 17,927
- Area (km²): 65

Telok Bahang is a state constituency in Penang, Malaysia, that has been represented in the Penang State Legislative Assembly since 1974. It covers the northwestern corner of Penang Island, including the town of Teluk Bahang.

The state constituency was first contested in 1974 and is mandated to return a single Assemblyman to the Penang State Legislative Assembly under the first-past-the-post voting system.

== Definition ==
=== Polling districts ===
According to the federal gazette issued on 30 March 2018, the Telok Bahang constituency is divided into 7 polling districts.

| State constituency | Polling districts | Code | Location |
|---|---|---|---|
| Telok Bahang (N40) | Telok Awak | 053/40/01 | SJK (C) Eok Hua |
| Telok Bahang (N40) | Telok Bahang | 053/40/02 | SK Telok Bahang |
| Telok Bahang (N40) | Sungai Pinang | 053/40/03 | SK Sungai Pinang |
| Telok Bahang (N40) | Pantai Acheh | 053/40/04 | SJK (C) Chin Hwa (Pantai Acheh) |
| Telok Bahang (N40) | Kuala Sungai Pinang | 053/40/05 | SJK (C) Yu Chye |
| Telok Bahang (N40) | Sungai Rusa | 053/40/06 | SK Sungai Rusa |
| Telok Bahang (N40) | Jalan Bahru | 053/40/07 | SK Sungai Korok |

It encompasses the entire northwestern corner of Penang Island, including the eponymous town of Teluk Bahang near the island's northwestern tip, and much of the sparsely populated rural west coast of Penang Island.

== Demographics ==
Ethnic breakdown of Telok Bahang's electorate as of 2023
1. Malay (68.1%)
2. Chinese (27.6%)
3. Indian (3.64%)
4. Other ethnicities (0.65%)

Total electors by polling district in 2016
| Polling district | Electors |
|---|---|
| Jalan Bahru | 1,989 |
| Kuala Sungai Pinang | 1,811 |
| Pantai Acheh | 648 |
| Sungai Pinang | 2,343 |
| Sungai Rusa | 1,943 |
| Telok Awak | 779 |
| Telok Bahang | 3,782 |
| Total | 13,295 |
Source: Malaysian Election Commission

== History ==
Penang State Legislative Assemblyman for Telok Bahang
| Assembly | No | Years | Member | Party |
Constituency created from Balik Pulau
| 4th | N16 | 1974 – 1978 | Yahaya Mohd. Yusoff | BN (UMNO) |
| 5th | N16 | 1978 – 1982 | Ahmad Radhi Pachee | BN (UMNO) |
| 6th | N16 | 1982 – 1986 | Yahaya Ahmad | BN (UMNO) |
| 7th | N31 | 1986 – 1990 | Yahaya Ahmad | BN (UMNO) |
| 8th | N31 | 1990 – 1995 | Hilmi Yahaya | BN (UMNO) |
| 9th | N33 | 1995 – 1999 | Hilmi Yahaya | BN (UMNO) |
| 10th | N33 | 1999 – 2004 | Hilmi Yahaya | BN (UMNO) |
| 11th | N40 | 2004 – 2008 | Siti Faridah Arshad | BN (UMNO) |
| 12th | N40 | 2008 – 2013 | Hilmi Yahaya | BN (UMNO) |
| 13th | N40 | 2013 – 2018 | Shah Haedan Ayoob Hussain Shah | BN (UMNO) |
| 14th | N40 | 2018 – 2020 | Zolkifly Mohd Lazim | PH (BERSATU) |
| 14th | N40 | 2020 - 2023 | Zolkifly Mohd Lazim | PN (BERSATU) |
| 14th | N40 | 2023 | Vacant (Note: Vacant from 6 March 2023 until the 2023 state election due to the incumbent was vacated from his seat in an approved motion in the Penang State Assembly along with 3 other BERSATU assemblymen.) | |
| 15th | N40 | 2023–present | Muhamad Kasim | PN (BERSATU) |

== Election results ==
The electoral results for the Telok Bahang state constituency in 2008, 2013 and 2018 are as follows.

Penang state election, 2023: Telok Bahang
| Party | Candidate | Votes | % | ∆% |
|---|---|---|---|---|
| PN | Muhamad Kasim | 7,245 | 53.50 | ▲53.50 |
| BN | Ahmad Zaki Shah Shah Headan | 6,301 | 46.50 | ▲4.40 |
| Total valid votes | | 13,546 | 100.00 | |
| Total rejected ballots | | 80 | | |
| Unreturned ballots | | 22 | | |
| Turnout | | 13,648 | 76.13 | ▼9.17 |
| Registered electors | | 17,927 | | |
| Majority | | 944 | 7.00 | ▲3.40 |
| PN gain from PKR | | Swing | | ? |

Penang state election, 2018: Telok Bahang
| Party | Candidate | Votes | % | ∆% |
|---|---|---|---|---|
| PKR | Zolkifly Mohd Lazim | 5,482 | 45.70 | ▲45.70 |
| BN | Shah Haedan Ayoob Hussain Shah | 5,057 | 42.10 | ▼11.50 |
| PAS | Mohd Ali Othman | 1,469 | 12.20 | ▲12.20 |
| Total valid votes | | 12,008 | 100.00 | |
| Total rejected ballots | | 179 | | |
| Unreturned ballots | | 44 | | |
| Turnout | | 12,231 | 85.30 | ▼2.50 |
| Registered electors | | 14,339 | | |
| Majority | | 425 | 3.60 | ▼3.60 |
| PKR gain from BN | | Swing | | ? |
Source(s) "His Majesty's Government Gazette - Notice of Contested Election, State Legislative Assembly for the State of Penang [P.U. (B) 252/2018]" (PDF). Attorney General's Chambers of Malaysia. 3 May 2018. "Federal Government Gazette - Results of Contested Election and Statements of the Poll after the Official Addition of Votes, State Constituencies for the State of Penang [P.U. (B) 326/2018]" (PDF). Attorney General's Chambers of Malaysia. 28 May 2018. Archived from the original (PDF) on 2019-08-29.

Penang state election, 2013: Telok Bahang
| Party | Candidate | Votes | % | ∆% |
|---|---|---|---|---|
| BN | Shah Haedan Ayoob Hussain Shah | 6,034 | 53.60 | ▲0.80 |
| PKR | Abdul Halim Hussain | 5,233 | 46.40 | ▼0.80 |
| Total valid votes | | 11,267 | 100.00 | |
| Total rejected ballots | | 167 | | |
| Unreturned ballots | | 19 | | |
| Turnout | | 11,453 | 87.80 | ▲9.00 |
| Registered electors | | 13,048 | | |
| Majority | | 801 | 7.20 | ▲1.60 |
| BN hold | | Swing | | |
Source(s) "Federal Government Gazette - Notice of Contested Election, State Legislative Assembly for the State of Penang [P.U. (B) 189/2013]" (PDF). Attorney General's Chambers of Malaysia. 26 April 2013. "Federal Government Gazette - Results of Contested Election and Statements of the Poll after the Official Addition of Votes, State Constituencies for the State of Penang [P.U. (B) 230/2013]" (PDF). Attorney General's Chambers of Malaysia. 22 May 2013. Archived from the original (PDF) on 2019-03-22.

Penang state election, 2008: Telok Bahang
| Party | Candidate | Votes | % | ∆% |
|---|---|---|---|---|
| BN | Hilmi Yahaya | 4,434 | 52.80 | ▼17.73 |
| PKR | Abdul Halim Hussain | 3,969 | 47.20 | ▲47.20 |
| Total valid votes | | 8,403 | 100.00 | |
| Total rejected ballots | | 152 | | |
| Unreturned ballots | | 10 | | |
| Turnout | | 8,565 | 78.80 | |
| Registered electors | | 10,866 | | |
| Majority | | 465 | 5.60 | |
| BN hold | | Swing | | |

Penang state election, 2004: Telok Bahang
| Party | Candidate | Votes | % | ∆% |
|---|---|---|---|---|
| BN | Siti Faridah binti Arshad | 5,797 | 70.53 | ▲9.11 |
| PAS | Abdul Aziz Ismail | 2,422 | 29.47 | ▲29.47 |
| Total valid votes | | 8,219 | 100.00 | |
| Total rejected ballots | | 172 | | |
| Unreturned ballots | | 6 | | |
| Turnout | | 8,397 | 77.81 | ▲2.49 |
| Registered electors | | 10,791 | | |
| Majority | | 3,375 | 41.06 | ▲18.23 |
| BN hold | | Swing | | |

Penang state election, 1999: Telok Bahang
| Party | Candidate | Votes | % | ∆% |
|---|---|---|---|---|
| BN | Hilmi Yahaya | 8,120 | 61.42 | ▼15.15 |
| PKR | Johari Kassim | 5,101 | 38.58 | ▲38.58 |
| Total valid votes | | 13,221 | 100.00 | |
| Total rejected ballots | | 307 | | |
| Unreturned ballots | | 0 | | |
| Turnout | | 13,528 | 75.32 | ▼0.44 |
| Registered electors | | 17,960 | | |
| Majority | | 3,019 | 22.83 | ▼36.42 |
| BN hold | | Swing | | |

Penang state election, 1995: Telok Bahang
| Party | Candidate | Votes | % | ∆% |
|---|---|---|---|---|
| BN | Hilmi Yahaya | 9,854 | 76.57 | ▲14.65 |
| DAP | Mohd Yushof Awang Karim | 2,228 | 17.31 | ▲17.31 |
| PAS | Rahim Rahmat | 787 | 6.12 | ▲6.12 |
| Total valid votes | | 12,869 | 100.00 | |
| Total rejected ballots | | 314 | | |
| Unreturned ballots | | 50 | | |
| Turnout | | 13,233 | 75.76 | ▲0.70 |
| Registered electors | | 17,466 | | |
| Majority | | 7,626 | 59.26 | ▲35.41 |
| BN hold | | Swing | | |

Penang state election, 1990: Telok Bahang
| Party | Candidate | Votes | % | ∆% |
|---|---|---|---|---|
| BN | Hilmi Yahaya | 6,364 | 61.92 | ▲6.14 |
| DAP | Sanusi Othman | 3,913 | 38.08 | ▲38.08 |
| Total valid votes | | 10,277 | 100.00 | |
| Total rejected ballots | | 264 | | |
| Unreturned ballots | | 12 | | |
| Turnout | | 10,553 | 75.06 | ▲3.60 |
| Registered electors | | 14,059 | | |
| Majority | | 2,451 | 23.85 | ▼0.03 |
| BN hold | | Swing | | |

Penang state election, 1986: Telok Bahang
| Party | Candidate | Votes | % | ∆% |
|---|---|---|---|---|
| BN | Yahaya Ahmad | 5,133 | 55.78 | ▼7.84 |
| DAP | Lim Keat Chai | 2,936 | 31.91 | ▲31.91 |
| PAS | Mohd Hashim | 1,133 | 12.31 | ▲12.31 |
| Total valid votes | | 9,202 | 100.00 | |
| Total rejected ballots | | 324 | | |
| Unreturned ballots | | 0 | | |
| Turnout | | 9,526 | 71.46 | ▼2.29 |
| Registered electors | | 13,331 | | |
| Majority | | 2,197 | 23.88 | ▼3.36 |
| BN hold | | Swing | | |

Penang state election, 1982: Telok Bahang
| Party | Candidate | Votes | % | ∆% |
|---|---|---|---|---|
| BN | Yahaya Ahmad | 6,241 | 63.62 | ▲11.62 |
| Parti Sosialis Rakyat Malaysia | Kassim Ahmad | 3,569 | 36.38 | ▲6.36 |
| Total valid votes | | 9,810 | 100.00 | |
| Total rejected ballots | | 237 | | |
| Unreturned ballots | | 0 | | |
| Turnout | | 10,047 | 73.75 | ▼1.79 |
| Registered electors | | 13,623 | | |
| Majority | | 2,672 | 27.24 | ▲5.26 |
| BN hold | | Swing | | |

Penang state election, 1978: Telok Bahang
| Party | Candidate | Votes | % | ∆% |
|---|---|---|---|---|
| BN | Ahmad Radhi Pachee | 4,413 | 52.00 | ▲0.33 |
| Parti Sosialis Rakyat Malaysia | Osman Din | 2,548 | 30.02 | ▲1.70 |
| Independent | Abdul Rahman Junus | 1,319 | 15.54 | ▲15.54 |
| PAS | Ibrahim Saad | 207 | 2.44 | ▲2.44 |
| Total valid votes | | 8,487 | 100.00 | |
| Total rejected ballots | | 459 | | |
| Unreturned ballots | | 0 | | |
| Turnout | | 8,946 | 75.54 | ▼4.86 |
| Registered electors | | 11,843 | | |
| Majority | | 1,865 | 21.97 | ▼1.37 |
| BN hold | | Swing | | |

Penang state election, 1974: Telok Bahang
| Party | Candidate | Votes | % | ∆% |
|---|---|---|---|---|
| BN | Yahaya Mohd. Yusoff | 4,068 | 51.66 | ▲51.66 |
| Parti Sosialis Rakyat Malaysia | Othman Salleh | 2,230 | 28.32 | ▲28.32 |
| DAP | Chew Ah Chung | 1,417 | 18.00 | ▼33.16 |
| PEKEMAS | Ismail Puteh | 159 | 2.02 | ▲2.02 |
| Total valid votes | | 7,874 | 100.00 | |
| Total rejected ballots | | 286 | | |
| Unreturned ballots | | 0 | | |
| Turnout | | 8,160 | 80.40 | ▲6.48 |
| Registered electors | | 10,149 | | |
| Majority | | 1,838 | 23.34 | ▲21.04 |
This was a new constituency created.

== See also ==
- Constituencies of Penang
