= 2019 Nigerian House of Representatives elections in Zamfara State =

The 2019 Nigerian House of Representatives elections in Zamfara State was held on February 23, 2019, to elect members of the House of Representatives to represent Zamfara State, Nigeria. The All Progressives Congress won all seats but the Supreme Court nullified the elections of all the candidates of the APC in the elections. The court ruled that the APC did not conduct valid primaries in the build-up to the elections. A unanimous judgement by a five-member panel of Judges decided that the party had no valid candidate and cannot be said to have won the general elections.

== Overview ==
Affiliation	Party		Total
Affiliation	APC	PDP	Total
Before Election	7	0	7
After Election	0	7	7

== Summary ==
District	Incumbent	Party	Elected Rep	Party
Anka/Talata/Mafara	Lawali Hassan Anka	APC	Kabiru Yahaya	PDP
Bakura/Maradun	Yahaya Chado Gora	APC	Ahmed Bakura Muhammad	PDP
Bungudu/Maru	Abdulmalik Zubairu Bungudu	APC	Shehu Ahmed	PDP
Gunmi/Bukkuyum	Mu'azu Lawal	APC	Sulaiman Gumi Abubakar	PDP
Gusau/Tsafe	Isah Ibrahim	APC	Kabiru Amadu	PDP
Kaura Namoda/Birnin Magaji	Aminu Sani-Jaji	APC	Sani Umar Dan-Galadima	PDP
Shinkafi/Zurmi	Abubakar Husaini Moriki	APC	Bello Shinkafi	PDP

== Results ==
=== Anka/Talata/Mafara ===
A total of 16 candidates registered with the Independent National Electoral Commission to contest in the election. PDP candidate Kabiru Yahaya won the election. APC candidate Ahmad Anka won the popular votes but his election was nullified on the ground that his party did not conduct a valid primary. Yahaya received 69.76% of the votes.

2019 Nigerian House of Representatives election in Zamfara State
Party	Candidate	Votes	%
PDP	Kabiru Yahaya	17,442	69.76%
A	Husaini Aliyu Mafara	2,288	9.15%
Others		5,273	21.09%
Total votes		25,003	100%
PDP hold			

=== Bakura/Maradun ===
A total of 16 candidates registered with the Independent National Electoral Commission to contest in the election. PDP candidate Ahmed Bakura Muhammad won the election. APC candidate Muhammed Rini won the popular votes but his election was nullified on the ground that his party did not conduct a valid primary. Muhammad received 84.49% of the votes.

2019 Nigerian House of Representatives election in Zamfara State
Party	Candidate	Votes	%
PDP	Ahmed Bakura Muhammad	27,240	84.49%
A	Aliyu Sanusi	2,679	8.31%
Others		2,323	7.20%
Total votes		32,242	100%
PDP hold			

=== Bungudu/Maru ===
A total of 13 candidates registered with the Independent National Electoral Commission to contest in the election. PDP candidate Shehu Ahmed won the election. APC candidate Zubairu Abdulmalik won the popular votes but his election was nullified on the ground that his party did not conduct a valid primary. Ahmed received 45.22% of the votes.

2019 Nigerian House of Representatives election in Zamfara State
Party	Candidate	Votes	%
PDP	Shehu Ahmed	17,062	45.22%
A	Sani Bello	12,643	33.51%
Others		8,022	21.26
Total votes		37,727	100%
PDP hold			

=== Gunmi/Bukkuyum ===
A total of 14 candidates registered with the Independent National Electoral Commission to contest in the election. PDP candidate Sulaiman Gumi Abubakar won the election. APC candidate Bukkuyum Unaru Jibo won the popular votes but his election was nullified on the ground that his party did not conduct a valid primary. Abubakar received 76.00% of the votes.

2019 Nigerian House of Representatives election in Zamfara State
Party	Candidate	Votes	%
PDP	Sulaiman Gumi Abubakar	23,095	76.00%
A	Aliyu Hassan Gummi	4,743	15.61%
Others		2,550	8.39%
Total votes		30,388	100%
PDP hold			

=== Gusau/Tsafe ===
A total of 25 candidates registered with the Independent National Electoral Commission to contest in the election. PDP candidate Kabiru Amadu won the election. APC candidate Rikiji Garba won the popular votes but his election was nullified on the ground that his party did not conduct a valid primary. Amadu received 54.91% of the votes.

2019 Nigerian House of Representatives election in Zamfara State
Party	Candidate	Votes	%
PDP	Kabiru Amadu	35,533	54.91%
A	Abdullahi Abubakar	22,217	34.33%
Others		6,967	10.77%
Total votes		64,717	100%
PDP hold			

=== Kaura Namoda/Birnin Magaji ===
A total of 20 candidates registered with the Independent National Electoral Commission to contest in the election. PDP candidate Sani Umar Dan-Galadima won the election. APC candidate Muhammed Birnin-magaji won the popular votes but his election was nullified on the ground that his party did not conduct a valid primary. Dan-Galadima received 92.88% of the votes.

2019 Nigerian House of Representatives election in Zamfara State
Party	Candidate	Votes	%
PDP	Sani Umar Dan-Galadima	23,672	92.88%
NRM	Aminu Isah Sakajiki	1,383	5.42%
Others		433	1.70%
Total votes		25,488	100%
PDP hold			

=== Shinkafi/Zurmi ===
A total of 15 candidates registered with the Independent National Electoral Commission to contest in the election. PDP candidate Bello Shinkafi won the election. APC candidate Husaini Zurmi won the popular votes but his election was nullified on the ground that his party did not conduct a valid primary. Shinkafi received 66.45% of the votes.

2019 Nigerian House of Representatives election in Zamfara State
Party	Candidate	Votes	%
PDP	Bello Shinkafi	16,638	66.45%
APGA	Aliyu Jibril Guraguri	3,231	12.90%
Others		5,171	20.65%
Total votes		25,040	100%
PDP hold			
