= Yahaya Chado =

Nigerian politician

Yahaya Chado Gora is a Nigerian politician and hails from Zamfara State. He was a member representing Maradun/Bakura Federal Constituency in the House of Representatives. In 2018, his two sons were abducted, but the younger was later released with a 10 million naira condition to release his older brother. He served as Commissioner for Local Governments and Chieftaincy Affairs, Zamfara State.

== See also ==
- 2019 Nigerian House of Representatives elections in Zamfara State
