= Mohammed Isa Anka =

Nigerian politician (born 1960)

Member of the House of Representatives from Zamfara State
- In office 2023–Incumbent
- Constituency: Anka/Talata Mafara Federal Constituency

Personal details
- Born: 20 February 1960 (age 66)
- Party: All Progressives Congress
- Occupation: Politician

Mohammed Isa Anka (born 20 February 1960) is a Nigerian politician currently serving as the representative for the Anka/Talata Mafara Federal Constituency of Zamfara State in the House of Representatives. He is a member of the All Progressives Congress.
