= Yushau Anka =

Nigerian politician

Yushau Mohammed Anka

Senator of the Federal Republic of Nigeria from Zamfara State West District
- In office 29 May 1999 – 29 May 2007
- Succeeded by: Ahmad Rufai Sani

Personal details
- Born: April 1950 Zamfara State, Nigeria
- Died: 12th October, 2020

Alhaji Yushau Mohammed Anka (April 1950 – 12 October 2020) was elected Senator for the Zamfara West constituency of Zamfara State, Nigeria at the start of the Nigerian Fourth Republic, running on the People's Democratic Party (PDP) platform. He held office from May 1999 to May 2007.

Anka was born in April 1950, and gained an M.Sc in Business Administration. He was elected National Financial Secretary for the National Republican Convention (NRC) party during the Nigerian Third Republic. He contested the Zamfara State gubernatorial election on the PDP platform in 1999, but lost to Ahmed Sani Yerima of the All Nigeria People's Party ANPP.

After taking his seat in the Senate in June 1999, he was appointed to committees on Ethics, Foreign Affairs, Police Affairs (vice-chairman), Commerce, Internal Affairs and Government Affairs. In August 2001, he said the Federal Government's Poverty Alleviation Programme was just distributing cash to political supporters rather than alleviating poverty. Anka changed over to the ANPP platform for his second Senate term. In May 2006, Anka spoke against the proposal to change the constitution so President Olusegun Obasanjo could run for a third four-year term.
