= Abdul'aziz Abubakar Yari =

Nigerian politician (born 1968)

Senator for Zamfara West
- Incumbent
- Assumed office 13 June 2023
- Preceded by: Lawali Hassan Anka

4th Governor of Zamfara State
- In office 29 May 2011 – 29 May 2019
- Preceded by: Mahmud Shinkafi
- Succeeded by: Bello Matawalle

Personal details
- Born: 28 September 1968 (age 58) Talata Mafara, North-Western State, Nigeria (now in Zamfara State, Nigeria)
- Party: All Progressives Congress
- Education: University of Salford, Manchester, United Kingdom
- Occupation: Politician, Businessman

Abdul'aziz Abubakar Yari (born 28 September 1968) is a Nigerian politician who was elected Governor of Zamfara State in the 26 April 2011 national election, running on the All Nigeria Peoples Party (ANPP) platform. Following the merger of the ANPP and several other opposition parties into the All Progressives Congress, and his son sultan Yari became a member of the All Progressives Congress.

== Education ==
Yari attended Talata Mafara Township Primary School, then proceeded to Government Teacher's College in Bakura from 1979 to 1984. He finished his tertiary education at Sokoto Polytechnic from 1991 to 1994 where he obtained a certificate and later a Diploma in Secretarial Studies in 2004. He also attended Kebbi Polytechnic for a Graduate Diploma in Public Administration in 2008. He obtained Leadership and Change Certificate from London School of Economics in 2023. He also awarded the Degree of Master of Science in Finance and Investment Management from University of Salford in 2025.

== Political career ==
Yari began his political career in 1999 when he served as the Secretary of the then All Nigeria People's Party (ANPP) between 1999 and 2003. He was elected Chairman of ANPP Zamfara State in 2003 and later rose to the position of ANPP National Financial Secretary and served in this position till 2007 when he was elected as Member representing Anka/Talata Mafara Federal Constituency from 2007 to 2011.

On 26 April 2011, Yari was elected Governor of Zamfara State on the platform of the All Nigeria Peoples Party(ANPP).

In the 2015 gubernatorial elections, he was re-elected as Governor on the platform of the All Progressive Congress (APC).

On 18 May 2015, Yari's colleagues in the Nigeria Governors’ Forum unanimously elected him as their chairman, succeeding Rt. Hon. Chibuike Rotimi Amaechi.

In addition, when Zamfara State Governor Mahmud Shinkafi defected to the PDP in January 2009, taking the ANPP's state executive committee with him, the ANPP's National Headquarters in Abuja was forced to create a Caretaker Committee headed by Yari. The committee's tenure was repeatedly extended.

Yari was elected Governor of Zamfara State, Nigeria, in the 26 April 2011 national elections, running on the All Nigeria Peoples Party (ANPP) platform. Yari is the son-in-law of Governor Mahmud Aliyu Shinkafi of the People's Democratic Party (PDP), whom he defeated in the election by 514,962 votes to Shinkafi's 460,656 votes. He said concerning the 2019 election that it is time to repay Buhari's bailout gesture.

=== Senate race (2019) ===
As his term as governor of Zamfara State drew to a close Yari ran for the Zamfara West senate seat and won by a very wide margin on the platform of the ruling APC. But his election and other APC candidates in the 2019 general election in Zamfara State were nullified by the Supreme Court on the ground that they were not validly nominated through party primaries. The court ordered INEC to declare candidates who were the runner-up in the elections as winners. Senator Kabiru Marafa, a member of the APC who was running for the party's governorship ticket, complained that the APC did not conduct primaries in Zamfara and asked the court to invalidate the primaries purportedly conducted by Yari, the party leader.

Yari was named the chairman, Senate committee on water resources of the 10th senate on 8 August 2023.

== Corruption allegations ==
=== Projects Verification Committee reports ===
Yari's successor, Bello Matawalle, created the Zamfara State Project Verification Committee led by Ahmad Zabarma to probe projects under Yari's governorship. In February 2020, at the Committee interim report press conference, Zabarma announced that the Yari administration had spent a suspiciously inflated amount on incomplete or yet-to-be-started projects. Zabarma claimed ₦3 billion was spent on the ongoing Zamfara State University project and ₦70 billion was spent on the House of Assembly renovation despite the University being only 30% completed and the House of Assembly renovation having not started at all. Zabarma also stated that ₦35 million was not refunded to Hajj pilgrims who could not be airlifted in 2012, over 1,000 vehicles belonging to the State Government (65% of its total vehicles) were missing after Yari left office, and ₦8.4 billion of state money was spent by Yari on exotic cars for associates and family along with several other cases of alleged corrupt practices using feeding programs, schools, water supply, and other projects. Yari claimed political persecution by his successor, Matawalle, against himself and the Zamfara APC.

The Project Verification Committee released its final report in late September which Matawalle claimed showed that Yari's administration had stole over ₦107 billion from the state. In early October, Matawalle set up a Commission of Inquiry to further probe the Yari administration.

=== Federal Project Refund scandal ===
After Yari left office, his successor, Bello Matawalle announced investigations into allegations of corruption during Yari's administration. In September 2020, Matawalle's Finance Commissioner Rabiu Garba claimed Yari and an associate diverted ₦37 billion in refunds on federal projects away from state government coffers. Yari's Finance Commissioner Muktar Idris denied the accusation and claimed that the money was used on building roads.

=== EFAB Properties wire transfer ===
In February 2021, the Peoples Gazette reported that on the day before Yari left the Governor's office, he wired ₦350 million to EFAB Properties Limited, a real estate developer based in Abuja. The EFAB account is also linked to Fabian Nwaora, a public works contractor and real estate developer. The report quoted anonymous EFCC officials who claimed the commission was investigating numerous last-minute transfers by Yari, but had not seen the EFAB Properties transfer. The report also claimed that Yari was so notoriously corrupt that he was nicknamed the "loaded governor" by officials at the Nigerian Governors’ Forum which Yari chaired.

== EFCC investigations and arrests ==
In February and April 2021, Yari was detained and interrogated by the Economic and Financial Crimes Commission in connection with around ₦300 billions he attempted to move from a corporate bank account. In the invitation letter sent to Yari to summon him for the April interrogation, the EFCC Director of Operations, Abdulkarim Chukkol, stated "conspiracy, diversion of public funds and money laundering" as the grounds for the interview. Sahara Reporters reported that the EFCC is also investigating Yari in connection with the alleged Paris Club refund corruption case involving the Central Bank of Nigeria, Attorney-General Abubakar Malami, Chief of Staff to the President Ibrahim Gambari, and former Representative Ned Nwoko.

=== ICPC investigations and seizures ===
The Independent Corrupt Practices Commission also accused Yari of corruption, specifically embezzling money from the Zamfara State treasury. In January 2021, Yari lost a court case that approved the seizure of $669,248 and over ₦24.3 million from him with the judge siding with the ICPC's argument that Yari was unable to explain the sources of the funds and thus the money was subject to forfeiture.

In February 2022, the ICPC won another case against Yari, this time for the interim forfeiture of 10 properties in Abuja, Kaduna, and Zamfara State along with Maryland in the United States of America. The judge stated that the interim order would last 60 days while the ICPC investigated further with the hearing on final forfeiture scheduled for April 28.
