= Yahaya Dikko =

Nigerian administrator and advisor

Yahaya Dikko was a Nigerian administrator who was General Manager of NEPA and later became Special Adviser on Petroleum and Energy Affairs to President Shehu Shagari. He was head of Nigeria's delegation to OPEC during the administration of Shagari and later became President of OPEC. Dikko was oil adviser in 1983 when global oil prices fell and Nigeria and OPEC had to cut oil prices, the first since an oil embargo began in 1973.

Dikko was born to the family of Abdurahman Dikko. He was educated at Zaria Middle School and Kaduna College. He attended Brighton Technical College. Dikko was a one time Executive Secretary of the Niger Dams Authority and General Manager of NEPA.
