= Lawali Hassan Anka =

Nigerian politician

Lawal Hassan Anka

Senator Zamfara West
- Incumbent
- Assumed office 2020

Senator for Zamfara West
- Incumbent
- Assumed office 2020
- Preceded by: Abdulaziz Yari Abubakar

Personal details
- Party: Peoples Democratic Party (PDP)
- Profession: Politician

Lawali Hassan Anka is a Nigerian politician, a senator and a member of the 9th National Assembly representing Anka/Mafara constituency. As of August 2020, Anka had not sponsored any legislation.
