= List of governors of Zamfara State =

This is a list of administrators and governors of Zamfara State, Nigeria. Until 1996 the area was part of Sokoto State.

Name	Title	Took office	Left office	Party	Notes
Jibril Yakubu	Administrator	7 October 1996	29 May 1999	Military	First Military Ruler and sole Administrator of Zamfara State
Ahmad Sani Yarima (Sardaunan Zamfara)	Governor	29 May 1999	29 May 2007	ANPP	First Civilian Executive Governor of Zamfara State. Elected to Office 1st on the platform of APP and later reelected for second term on the platform of ANPP.
Mahmud Shinkafi (Dallatun Zamfara)	Governor	29 May 2007	29 May 2011	ANPP	Second Civilian Executive Governor of Zamfara State and first Deputy Governor to be selected in the history of the country by his mentor to serve after him. He served only one tenure in Office. Elected on the platform of ANPP as Governor and later decamp to PDP.
Abdul'aziz Abubakar Yari (Shatiman Mafara)	Governor	29 May 2011	29 May 2019	ANPP	Third Executive Governor of Zamfara State. He also served his first tenure under the platform of ANPP, and re elected in 2015 under platform of APC, he has finished his constitutional eight years in office, and handed over to the new court order governor.
Bello Matawalle (Matawallen Maradun)	Governor	29 May 2019	29 May 2023	APC	Matawalle assume office as the Executive Governor of Zamfara State, succeeding Abdul’aziz Yari after the Supreme Court judgement which nullifies APC’s candidates across Zamfara State.
Dauda Lawal	Governor	29 May 2023	Incumbent	PDP	Fifth Civilian Executive Governor of Zamfara State. Won the governorship elections held on 18th March, 2023 against Bello Matawalle, becoming the second opposition candidate to defeat a sitting governor in the State's history.

== See also ==
- States of Nigeria
- List of state governors of Nigeria
