= Betong Island =

Group of islets off the coast of Penang Island in Malaysia

Native name: Pulau Betong
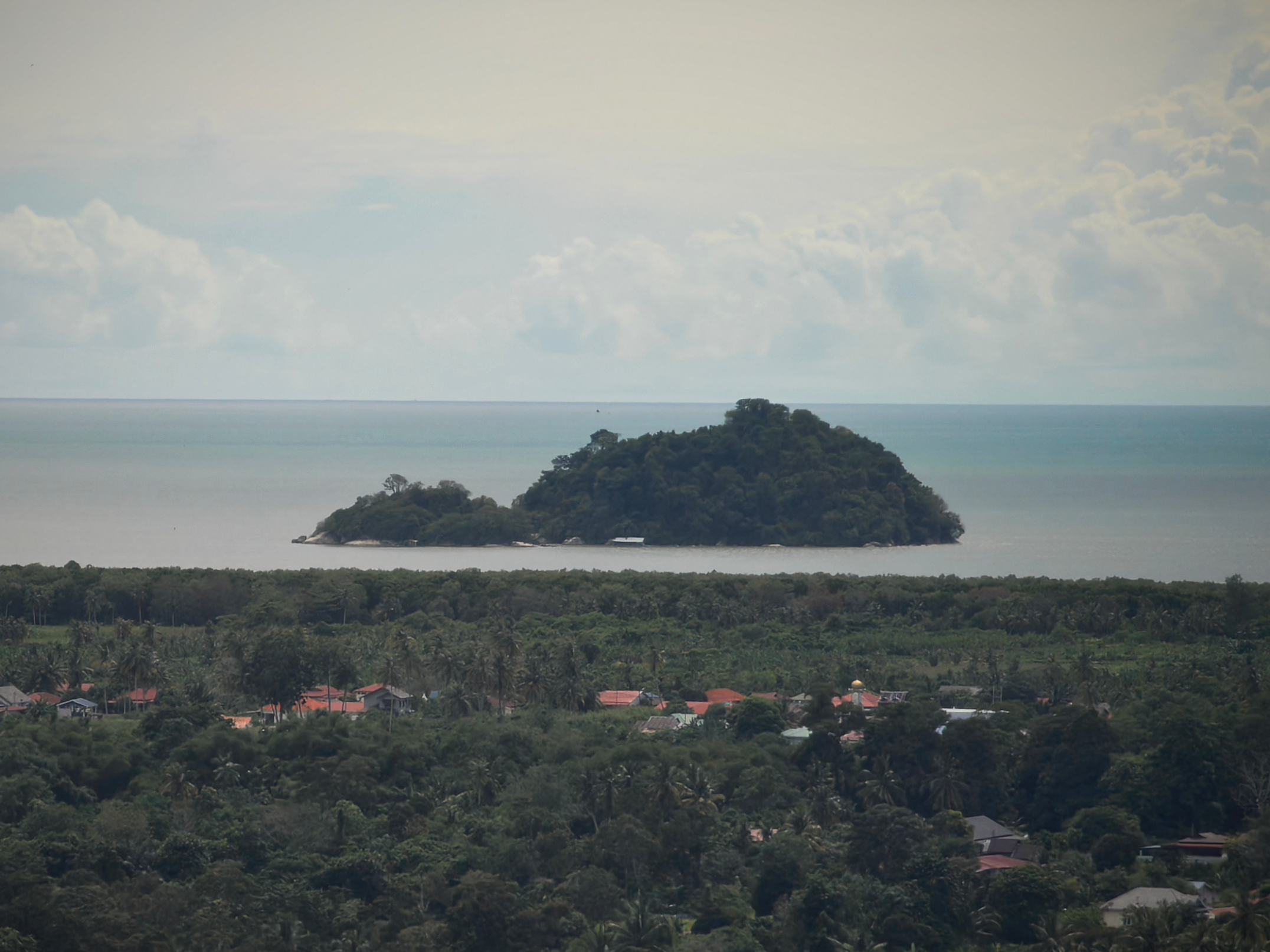

Geography
- Location: Strait of Malacca
- Coordinates: 5°18′52.56″N 100°11′0.7692″E
- Area: 0.028328 km^{2} (0.010938 sq mi)

Administration
- Malaysia
- State: Penang
- City: George Town
- District: Southwest
- Mukim: Pulau Betong

Betong Island is a group of two islets off the southwestern coast of Penang Island in the Malaysian state of Penang. The islets have a combined land mass of 7 acres (0.028 km^{2}). Although they are uninhabited, there is a small fish farm on the larger islet, and they are visited by anglers and fishermen in the daytime.

== See also ==
- List of islands of Malaysia
