= Yahaya Abdulkarim =

Nigerian politician (born 1944)

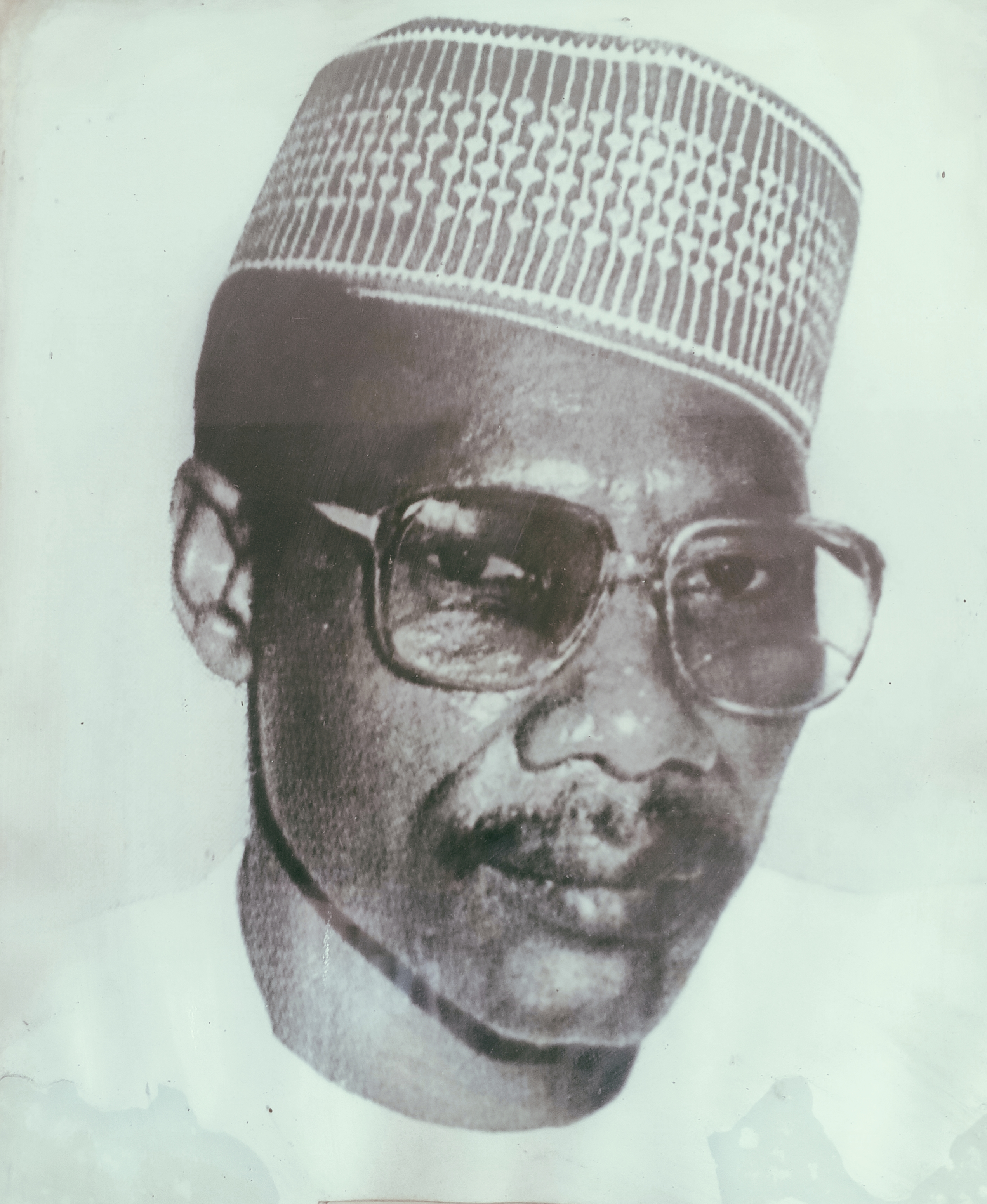

Governor of Sokoto State
- In office January 1992 – November 1993
- Preceded by: Bashir Salihi Magashi
- Succeeded by: Yakubu Mu'azu

Personal details
- Born: 21 August 1944 (age 81) Talata Mafara, Northern Region, British Nigeria (now in Zamfara State, Nigeria)
- Party: People's Democratic Party

Malam Yahaya Abdulkarim (born 21 August 1944) is a Nigerian politician who was governor of Sokoto State, between January 1992 and November 1993, during General Ibrahim Babangida's attempted transition to democracy. After the return to democracy in 1999, he became a power in the Zamfara State branch of the People's Democratic Party (PDP), and served for a while in the cabinet of president Olusegun Obasanjo.

== Early career ==
Yahaya Abdulkarim was born on 21 August 1944 in Talata Mafara, Zamfara State. His father was a Native Authority officer. He joined the civil service of the North-Western State as a teacher, and held various positions before retiring in 1989 as Director-General in the Ministry of Budget and Economic Planning of Sokoto State.

== Governor of Sokoto State ==
Abdulkarim was elected governor of Sokoto State, Nigeria in January 1992, representing the National Republican Convention (NRC). He was forced out of office in November 1993 by the military regime of General Sani Abacha. During his period of office, he feuded with Attahiru Bafarawa, the NRC party chairman in the state. The feud persisted, and when Bafarawa became Governor of Sokoto State in 1999, he followed a policy of neglecting all roads and buildings built by the Abdulkarim administration. In 1992, Abdulkarim signed the bill establishing the Talata Mafara Polytechnic, later renamed the Abdu Gusau Polytechnic.

== Later career ==
In September 2002, Abdulkarim was appointed to a sub-committee of the Niger Delta Development Commission to monitor a multi-billion naira developmental project that had been launched in the nine oil-producing states.

Abdulkarim was appointed Minister of State for Works in president Olusegun Obasanjo's cabinet in July 2005. He replaced Alhaji Saleh Shehu in this position. In November 2006, he unfolded plans for an extensive and accelerated roads recovery programme to target the Christmas season. When the Minister of Works, Adeseye Ogunlewe, was dismissed in March 2006, he was promoted to Minister of Works. He was later subject to a Senate inquiry into his conduct while in this office.

He was an unsuccessful candidate for governor of Zamfara State on the People's Democratic Party (PDP) platform in the April 2007 elections. By 2007, the Zamfara State PDP had split into two factions, one led by Abdulkarim and the other by former National Security Adviser, General Aliyu Gusau. In March 2008, Abdulkarim led a delegation from Zamfara to ask the PDP national chairman, Prince Vincent Ogbulafor, to prevent Gusau from interfering in the party's affairs.

In October 2008, it was reported that he was being considered for a ministerial position in the cabinet of president Umaru Yar'Adua.
