= Tijjani Yahaya Kaura =

Nigerian politician

Senator Tijjani Yahaya Kaura MFR

Chairman of the Board of Nigeria Export Processing Zones Authority (NEPZA)
- Incumbent
- Assumed office 9 February 2026

Managing Director of the Oil and Gas Free Zones Authority (OGFZA)
- In office 18 July 2022 – 13 October 2023
- Preceded by: Umana Okon Umana
- Succeeded by: Bamanga Usman Jada

Senator for Zamfara North
- In office June 2015 – June 2019
- Succeeded by: Ya’u Sahabi

Personal details
- Born: 3 February 1959 (age 67) Kaura Namoda, Zamfara State, Nigeria
- Party: All Progressives Congress (APC)
- Occupation: Politician

Tijjani Yahaya Kaura MFR (born 3 February 1959) is a Nigerian politician who is the current chairman of the governing goard of the Nigeria Export Processing Zones Authority (NEPZA), inaugurated in February 2026.

He previously served as the managing director of the Oil and Gas Free Zones Authority (OGFZA) from July 2022 until October 2023, when he was succeeded by Bamanga Usman Jada.
