= Sahabi Alhaji Yaú =

Nigerian politician

Senator of the Federal Republic of Nigeria from Zamfara State North District
- Incumbent
- Assumed office 2007
- Constituency: Zamfara North

Personal details
- Born: 16 July 1956 (age 69)
- Party: People's Democratic Party (PDP)
- Profession: Politician

Sahabi Alhaji Yaú (Note: Also spelled Ya'u or Yau.) (born 16 July 1956) is a Nigerian politician who was elected Senator in 2007 on the platform of All Nigeria Peoples Party to represent Zamfara North Senetorial District of Zamfara State.

== Political career ==
Yaú was elected to the senate on the All Nigeria Peoples Party (ANPP) slate for the Zamfara North Senatorial District in 2007. He was appointed to committees on Downstream Petroleum, Inter-Parliamentary Affairs, Public Accounts and States & Local Government.

After the state governor Alhaji Mamuda Aliyu Shinkafi transferred his allegiance from the ANPP to the Peoples Democratic Party (PDP), Ya'u made it clear that he retained loyalty to Shinkafi, although he still remains technically a member of the ANPP. In February 2008, Ya’u gave his support for President Umaru Yar'Adua (PDP) against charges that he was indecisive, saying that it was necessary to study situations in Nigeria thoroughly before taking decisions.

In March 2009, Yaú said that the National Assembly's Joint Committee on Constitution Review, of which he is a member, was considering giving the third tier of government in Nigeria budgets independent of the state governments. The goal would be to ensure that funding for local projects was used for the intended purpose.

In the 9 April 2011 elections, Yaú ran for re-election as Zamfara North Senator, this time on the People's Democratic Party (PDP) platform. He won with 118,056 votes.

== Personal life ==
Sahabi Ya'u was party to high-profile court case after one of his wives maintained she had not consented to their marriage. The case attracted international attention because it involved the intersection of Islamic and secular courts in the Nigerian legal system.
