= Mahmud Shinkafi =

Former Governor of sokoto State

Alhaji Mamud Aliyu Shinkafi is a Nigerian politician. He was elected governor of Zamfara State in 2007 on the All Nigeria Peoples Party (ANPP) slate.

== Political career ==
On May 29, 1999 he became the deputy to Ahmad Sani Yarima, the first executive civilian governor of Zamfara State. After his tenure as deputy governor between 1999-2007, he became governor in 2007. Later in 2008, Shinkafi defected to the rival Peoples Democratic Party (PDP), causing considerable controversy. His governorship tenure ended in 2011.

In 2017, he defected to the All Progressives Congress.

== 2002 riots controversy ==
In November 2002, Nigerian journalist Isioma Daniel published an article in ThisDay newspaper about the Miss World beauty pageant, which was scheduled to be held in Nigeria later that year. Responding to opposition from sections of the Nigerian Muslim community, Daniel wrote that Prophet Muhammad would probably have chosen a wife from among the contestants. The remark triggered violent religious riots in Kaduna that left more than 200 people dead, 1,000 injured and 11,000 homeless, and led to the torching of ThisDay's offices in the city.

On 26 November 2002, an Islamist government of Zamfara State issued a fatwa against Isioma Daniel; in the words of Zamfara deputy governor Mamuda Aliyu Shinkafi, later broadcast on the local radio:

"Like Salman Rushdie, the blood of Isioma Daniel can be shed. It is abiding on all Muslims wherever they are to consider the killing of the writer as a religious duty."

While the Nigerian government denounced the judgement as "unconstitutional" and "null and void", Muslim leaders were divided over its validity, some arguing that the subsequent retraction and apology meant that the fatwa was inappropriate. Thus Lateef Adegbite, Secretary-General of the Nigerian Supreme Council for Islamic Affairs, was quick to reject the death penalty since Daniel was not Muslim and the newspaper had apologised publicly.

== Personal life ==
He is married to Hajara Sani Aliyu Shinkafi.
