= Ahmad Sani Yerima =

Nigerian politician (born 1960)

Governor of Zamfara State
- In office 29 May 1999 – 29 May 2007
- Preceded by: Jibril Yakubu
- Succeeded by: Mahmud Shinkafi

Senator of the Federal Republic of Nigeria
- In office June 2007 – June 2019
- Succeeded by: Lawani Hassan
- Constituency: Zamfara West

Personal details
- Born: Ahmad Rufai Sani; 22 July 1960 (age 66) Anka, Northern Region, British Nigeria (now in Zamfara State, Nigeria)
- Party: All Progressives Congress (APC)

Ahmed Rufai Sani Yerima (born 22 July 1960) is a Nigerian politician who was Governor of Zamfara State from May 1999 to May 2007, and served as Senator for Zamfara West and Deputy Minority Leader in the Senate. He is a member of the All Progressives Congress (APC).

== Early years ==
Ahmed Rufai Sani was born on 22 July 1960 in Anka town, Zamfara State.

== Career ==
As part of the National Youth Service, he was posted to Borno State where he worked in the Budget Department of the Governor's office and also taught at the Borno College of Basic Studies, Maiduguri.

In 1983, he began his career in the Sokoto state civil service as an economic planning officer in the Ministry of Finance.

In 1994, Yerima returned to the Sokoto state civil service as the Director of Budget in the Ministry of Finance.

In September 1998, he left the civil service to pursue a political career.

== Presidential candidacy ==
Yerima met President Muhammadu Buhari, to inform him of his intention to run for president. He announced his candidacy on 6 May 2022.

He said the President gave him the nod to contest the ticket. He further explained that he is acting within the provisions of the Nigerian constitution.

Yerima said if elected he would fight insecurity, poverty and ignorance.

However, the party did not clear him to contest the party primaries.

== Governor of Zamfara State ==
Yerima was elected governor of Zamfara State in 1999. He was re-elected in 2003 for a second term, which ended on 29 May 2007.

=== Sharia Law ===
Yerima was the first Nigerian state governor to implement Sharia law in his state, which came into effect on 27 January 2000. This was greeted with enthusiasm by the state's Muslim majority; thousands of people gathered on the streets of Gusau cheered and shouted "God is great".

Sharia implementation bodies were established in Zamfara, including the Council of Ulama, Hisbah Commission, Zakkat and Endowment Board, Sharia Research and Development Board, and the Preaching Commission.

The Governor stressed his commitment to Nigeria as a multi-faith society. However, some of the changes introduced affected all citizens of the state. The sale and consumption of alcohol and prostitution were subject to a statewide ban.

The introduction of Sharia in Zamfara was challenged in the courts by Huri-Laws, a Nigerian human rights NGO, and by a Christian citizen from the state. The Zamfara State High Court dismissed both cases, ruling that the statute did not infringe upon the rights of either claimant.

== Senate career ==
Yerima put his name forward to be the ANPP candidate for the 2007 presidential election and won backing from the Christian Alliance, but withdrew from the contest at the party's 2007 national convention to back former Head of State Muhammadu Buhari as the ANPP candidate.

Yarima was elected Senator representing Zamfara West constituency for the All Nigeria People's Party in April 2007. He was appointed to committees on Selection, Federal Character & Inter-Government Affairs, Drugs and Narcotics, Anti Corruption and Agriculture.

Yerima ran again in the 9 April 2011 elections for Senator for Zamfara West on the ANPP platform. He was reelected with 154,359 votes.

=== Marriage controversy ===
Senator Sani was accused of marrying a 13 year old child bride from Egypt and was investigated for having violated Nigeria's Child Rights Act of 2003. However, under Article 61 Second Schedule of the Nigerian Constitution, the Nigerian Government has no power to legislate on “marriages under Islamic law and Customary law including matrimonial causes relating thereto”, meaning that Senator Yerima had no legal case to answer and the investigation was dropped. He maintained that he has not violated sharia: "History tells us that Prophet Muhammad did marry a young girl as well. Therefore I have not contravened any law." According to Al Jazeera, he paid $100,000 as dowry for the 13-year-old Egyptian.

== March 2013 arrest ==
Senator Yerima was arrested on 9 March 2013 after taking part in a live Hausa radio programme broadcast by the Federal Radio Corporation of Nigeria. The Kaduna State Police Commissioner arrested the Senator immediately after the programme for making 'inciting' comments. Yerima was released three hours later after questioning. A spokesperson for the All Nigeria Peoples Party condemned the arrest and claimed that it suggested that the ruling People's Democratic Party were determined to frustrate the opposition coalition for the 2015 election.
