= Sadiku (Boko Haram) =

Nigerian Islamist leader

- Born: Adamu Yunusa; Biu, Nigeria
- Other names: Abubakar Saidu, Mallam Sadiku
- Military career
- Allegiance: Darul Islam (until 2009, alleged); Boko Haram (c. 2010–present)
- Commands: "Sadiku faction"
- Conflicts: Boko Haram insurgency Nigerian bandit conflict

Abubakar Saidu (born Adamu Yunusa), better known by his nom de guerre Sadiku or Mallam Sadiku, is a Nigerian Islamist militant who is a senior member of Boko Haram. The leader of one of Boko Haram's most prominent factions, he was a key figure in the group's expansion outside of northeast Nigeria.

Originally sent to Niger State by Boko Haram leader Abubakar Shekau in 2014 to secure the loyalty of the exiled Salafi jihadist Darul Islam movement, he formed a militant cell in the state that expanded over time. Sadiku's faction has formed numerous alliances, including with local bandits and the Christian-majority Gbaygi people. His faction has been responsible for numerous attacks and kidnappings in the region, most famously the Abuja–Kaduna train attack which the group gained millions of dollars from. It has also been implicated in attacks such as the Papiri kidnapping and the 2026 Kwara State attacks.

== Biography ==
An ethnic Babur, Sadiku was born in Biu, Borno State. A Nigeria Security and Civil Defence Corps document said that his birth name was Adamu Yunusa. Other sources reported his real name as Abubakar Saidu. He has a degree in Western and Islamic education.

Following the 2009 Boko Haram uprising, a number of youths from the Salafist group Darul Salem (Darul Islam) moved from Niger State to northeastern Nigeria to participate in the Boko Haram insurgency on Boko Haram's side. The Hudson Institute wrote that Sadiku was one of these youths, and he likely joined Boko Haram between Darul Salem's expulsion from Niger in 2009 and the mid-2010s. The Combating Terrorism Center wrote that it was unlikely that Sadiku was a member of Darul Salem.

Boko Haram leader Abubakar Shekau sent Sadiku to Niger State in 2014 as part of a seven-member delegation to meet with the remaining members of Darul Salem. He recruited some of these men and started a cell in Niger.

Sadiku began rising to prominence around 2015 or 2016. Around that time, sources reported that he had developed strong ties with Shekau and was ordered to oversee the relocation of fighters to northwest Nigeria, as they had been set back by military offensives in the northeast. He succeeded in doing so, amassing a sizable force over the following years.

By late 2019, Sadiku had been guiding operations of his former Darul Salem associates and his own relocated fighters in Toto, Nasarawa State. That year, he planned the killing of senior Boko Haram member Adam Bitri, who was seen as a traitor, having defected to the Islamic State's West Africa Province (ISWAP) before accepting an offer by the Nigerian government to de-radicalize. After Bitri died, Shekau dispatched a delegation headed by Sadiku to ensure his death would not disrupt the expanding relationship with gangs allied with Bitri. The delegation helped secure a treaty with the gangs. Around 2020, Shekau appointed Sadiku as his envoy to Darul Salem to negotiate the group's allegiance. During this time, he taught its members how to make explosives. Shekau dispatched Sadiku to Niger in 2020, where he built two bases on the border of Niger and Kaduna State that were manned by recruits from Darul Salem.

Since Shekau's death in 2021, Sadiku has pledged allegiance to the new leader of Boko Haram, Bakura Doro. International Crisis Group, citing a former affiliate of Sadiku, reported that Sadiku initially denounced Bakura's killing of Boko Haram imam Sahalaba, but later swore his allegiance. Sadiku has performed favors on behalf of numerous jihadists, including Ansaru, ISWAP, and Bakura. He reportedly helped both ISWAP and Bakura's fighters relocate from northeast Nigeria to the northwest. He was seriously injured in 2022. Between October and November that year, Sadiku ordered the execution of several jihadists who joined his faction after escaping during the Kuje prison break, fearing they were ISWAP spies since the prison break was conducted by the group.

By 2026, he was referred to as the "Shekau of the North-Central" for his role in expanding the group.

== Sadiku's faction ==
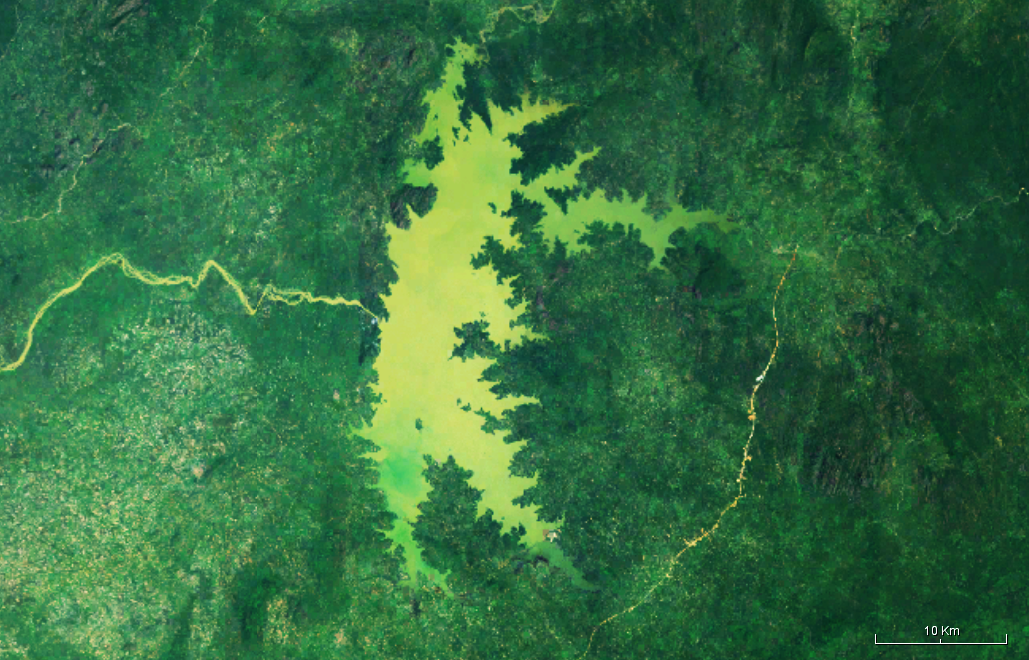
Sadiku's faction was originally based in Shiroro, Niger State (Lake Shiroro pictured)

Sadiku's faction had initially operated in the Allawa forest of Shiroro, Niger State. The group expanded to the Borgu area of Kainji National Park. They started to work with Fulani bandits, raising revenue from kidnappings and cattle raiding. The faction tolerated the bandits' use of alcohol, drugs, and prostitutes, despite its hardline religious beliefs. The faction also launched efforts to recruit Gbagyi people, who are indigenous to the Federal Capital Territory (FCT) and had been displaced en masse due to the expansion of Abuja. Although many Gbagyi are Christian, Sadiku allowed them to practice their faith, in exchange for the villagers providing equipment and intelligence to, and helping transport Sadiku's men. His deals with bandits also accounted for the Gbagyi, as many bandits had been raiding their villages. He offered these bandits advanced weaponry, such as improvised explosive devices, in exchange for them making a peace deal with the villagers. The groups who opposed the deal were targeted by Sadiku's men, in an effort to gain further trust from the Gbagyi.

By 2019, his network in Shiroro had a sizable number of members. His men began operating under the name Darul Salem rather than Boko Haram, likely for financial gain or to cover Boko Haram's operations in north-central Nigeria. In Shiroro, Munya, and Rafi, banditry and terrorism had displaced over 42,000 people. Weapons to Shiroro were supplied directly by Bakura from Barwa Island in Lake Chad. The faction entered the village of Kurebe in 2020, where they preached to its children. They started forcefully marrying girls from the village, including at least five minors who were married to some of Sadiku's lieutenants and were treated as sex slaves. The group also recruited at least two minors into its ranks. The faction's presence made the village a target of Nigerian Air Force (NAF) operations, which killed several civilians.

The large number of kidnappings committed by Sadiku's faction in the late 2010s prompted a Nigerian military operation against its camps in August 2020 that resulted in the arrest of many of its fighters. Following the operation, Sadiku's faction evacuated to other parts of Nasarawa, along with the states of Niger and Kaduna, while also recruiting Boko Haram members from the northeast. His group formed friendly or hostile relationships with bandit groups in northwest and north-central Nigeria, depending on financial opportunities. By 2021, Sadiku's faction had a presence in the axis surrounding the FCT.

By 2022, Sadiku's faction had a large presence across the north-central states. On 28 March 2022, a Kaduna-bound train from Abuja carrying 970 people was hijacked by Sadiku's faction, in collaboration with bandit leaders Dogo Giɗe and Ali Kawaje (Ali Kachalla). The hijacking, which resulted in the death of eight people and abduction of 62 more, was planned for months, with Sadiku's faction recruiting men from Kawaje's gang in preparation. A trial run that derailed a train was attempted in October 2021. As a result of the successful attack, the faction secured a hostage exchange that saw the release of several children of Sadiku and his lieutenants, who were arrested in Nasarawa in 2020. Sadiku also reportedly gained 6 billion naira ($4.1 million) from ransoms. After the negotiations finished in November 2022, many of Sadiku's men moved to areas across the North-Central region.

Members of Lakurawa have visited Sadiku's cell in Shiroro since 2023, in the first confirmed interactions between the group and Boko Haram. Sadiku formed an alliance with Lakurawa, ordering his men to reinforce the group.

His faction eventually broke ties with Gide, resulting in violent clashes. A former associate of Sadiku said that Sadiku had been "arrogant" and demanded respect from the bandits, leading to the fallout. The NAF later bombed Sadiku's base in Shiroro, forcing his faction to move into Kwara State and Kebbi State, apparently as a result of their alliance with Lakurawa. In January 2025, Gide's men claimed the killing of 20 fighters from Sadiku's faction. Despite this, the Institute for Security Studies reported in July that Bakura was possibly mediating a deal between the two groups.

By 2025, it was reported that Sadiku's faction was forcing residents in the northwest to pay taxes to the group. Since July 2025, parts of the faction began moving to the Kainji National Park, followed by an increase in attacks and raids against villages on the Niger–Kwara border. Following the arrest of senior jihadist Mallam Mahmuda in mid-2025, some his men defected to Sadiku, while others fled to neighboring Benin. On 21 November 2025, Sadiku's men reportedly abducted over 300 schoolchildren from the St. Mary's Catholic School in Papiri, Niger State. Vincent Foucher of the French National Centre for Scientific Research said that the attack was conducted in order to finance the relocation of his men.

Sadiku's faction was likely behind a February 2026 massacre in the villages of Woro and Nuku, Kwara State, that killed at least 170 people; the residents had rejected their demands to adopt Sharia law and rebel against Nigeria. Approximately a month prior, his men killed 30 people and abducted several others during a raid on Kasuwan Daji, Niger.
