= Ganar Kiyawa massacre =

2022 mass killing in Zamfara, Nigeria

- Part of Nigerian bandit conflict
- Location: Ganar Kiyawa, Bukkuyum LGA, Zamfara State, Nigeria
- Date: 20 March 2022
- Victim: 37 killed Several kidnapped 20+ refugees
- Perpetrator: Unknown bandits

On 20 March 2022, at least 37 people were killed by bandits in the village of Ganar Kiyawa, in Bukkuyum, Zamfara State, Nigeria.

== Prelude ==
Zamfara State has been a hotbed of over 100 different bandit groups for years, with kidnappings and massacres frequent in villages that don't pay ransom or are not close to a Nigerian military post. In January 2022, a bandit attack on several villages killed over 200 people in Bukkuyum LGA, where Ganar Kiyawa is located. In two villages near Ganar Kiyawa in February, bandits collected a 12 million naira ransom for 26 civilians abducted from the town and the neighboring Nasarawa Burkullu. In the weeks leading up to the attack, Ganar Kiyawa residents paid 2 million naira in harvest taxes, and another two million ransom for civilians.

Residents of Ganar Kiyawa expected the attack ahead of time, with the men of the village sleeping in the bush the night before anticipating the attack. The bandits had entered the town the past few nights attempting to attack, but because no one was there sleeping, they left.

== Massacre ==
To surprise the inhabitants, the bandits attacked the morning of 20 March, when all the civilians came back from the bush from sleeping. Witnesses stated that the bandits shot indiscriminately once they entered the village from the western side, before going house to house and shooting everyone inside. Shops in the town were looted as well. According to a community leader in the Bukkuyum LGA, the village head, local traditional rulers, and many others were killed. Twenty villagers fled to nearby villages, and those who couldn't make it were kidnapped.

== Aftermath ==
The next day, survivors picked up the bodies of 24 people in the village, and stated many more are likely left in the bush. The bandits arrived at the village cemetery that same day, assuming funerals were going on for the buried, but no one was there, so they left. The funerals instead took place at Adabka, three kilometers away. The death toll later rose to 37 killed.

The Zamfara State police stated 16 people were killed, with the police spokesperson and a military spokesperson visiting the village. Zamfara State governor Bello Matawalle expressed his condolences.
