= 2026 Kwara State attacks =

Massacre by Terrorist militants in Nigeria

- Part of the Boko Haram insurgency
- Location: 9°44′24″N 4°12′21″E; Nuku and Woro, Kwara State, Nigeria
- Date: 3–4 February 2026; ~17:30 – 03:00 (WAT, UTC+01:00)
- Attack type: Massacre, mass shooting, mass murder, arson, kidnapping
- Deaths: 200+
- Injuries: 50+
- Victim: 38 kidnapped
- Perpetrators: Boko Haram; Sadiku faction; Lakurawa (claimed by Mohammed Omar Bio)
- Motive: Islamic extremism, villagers rejecting their version of sharia law

On 3 February 2026, hundreds of extremist militants attacked the villages of Woro and Nuku (7 km to the west) in Kwara State, Nigeria, killing at least 162 residents. It was one of the deadliest attacks in Nigeria in months. Nigerian sources labelled the event the Kwara massacre.

Attack location on a map of Nigeria

== Attacks ==
=== Prelude ===
The attackers were reportedly jihadists based in forests around the Borgu region who previously preached in Woro and had ordered residents to embrace their version of Sharia. They had earlier preached in border villages in Niger State, encouraging residents to embrace their version of Sharia and reject the Nigerian constitution and foundations by disobedience to the government and bowing to the soon to be attackers demends Amnesty International reported they sent letters and pamphlets to Woro two weeks before the attack. The attackers sent another letter to the village's head five months prior, informing him they intended to preach in the village. The Ilorin council was informed of the letter and requested soldiers be deployed to Woro, however they withdrew after a few weeks. The last warning letter, delivered in January, was addressed by Boko Haram under its formal name and its leader in Lake Chad, Bakura Doro.

=== Attack ===
The attack on Nuku and Woro, which are neighbouring, predominately Muslim villages in Kaiama, Kwara, near the Beninese border, began at 17:30 WAT. It lasted several hours and extended till 03:00 the following morning. Hundreds of gunmen were present, according to a local Red Cross official. They were armed with explosives, AK-47s, and pump action weapons, and had surrounded the village, blocking its exits. The attackers began firing after the villagers rejected their demands.

The attackers, who rode motorbikes, moved door-to-door, executing residents and setting fire to buildings. They also fired at motorists along a federal highway that passed into the area. Between 18:30 and 20:00, the attack entered an "execution phase", where the killings escalated. A local politician said gunmen gathered people together and bound their hands before executing them. Amnesty said the attackers had "free rein" during the attack, rounding up and massacring young men and entire families and looting shops. A military aircraft hovered over the site at around 20:00, prompting the attackers to retreat. Residents began emerging an hour later, and the attackers, after regrouping, called for prayers at a mosque as a ruse, killing people who showed up. The massacre continued until 02:00 the following morning. Soldiers arrived an hour later, although the attackers had already fled.

The attackers also burned down homes, shops, and a palace belonging to Woro's traditional king, Alhaji Salihu Umar. The attackers targeted Umar's home, who they had written their letters to. He survived the attack since he was not present at the time, but the attackers ended up killing or kidnapping members of his family instead. Approximately 38 homes were destroyed. The fate of several people remained unknown. Many residents fled into the surrounding bushland. A survivor said residents who were unable to escape climbed treetops to survive.

== Casualties ==
Initial reports said between 35 and 40 people were killed in the attack. The death toll later rose to 162, according to Member of Parliament Mohammed Omar Bio and the Red Cross, with the latter adding that searches for additional bodies were ongoing. The attack was indiscriminate. Also killed were the chief Imam of Woro, a school principal, a headmistress, and schoolchildren. The death toll was later reported to have risen to over 200, as more bodies were recovered from the surrounding bushland. A local said around 95% of the dead were Muslim, and the rest were Christian.

Amnesty said many people were shot at close range and some were burnt alive or had their throats slit. Some victims were mutilated. It was the deadliest attack in Nigeria in 2026, and according to the Critical Threats Project, the deadliest outside of northeast Nigeria to date and the deadliest jihadist attack of the decade.

38 people were abducted. Alhaji Umar Salihu Tanko, the village head of Woro, said three of his children were killed and his wife and two others were kidnapped; some kidnapped were transported in a stolen Jeep. More than 50 people were hospitalised.

== Perpetrators ==
Omar Bio said the attacks were conducted by the Islamic State-affiliated group Lakurawa, although no group took responsibility. The Critical Threats Project said it was unlikely Lakurawa was the perpetrator, since the group normally operates further north near the border of Niger. James Barnett of the Hudson Institute said Boko Haram was responsible for other massacres in the area, and it was the most likely perpetrator. President Bola Tinubu also blamed Boko Haram. It was reported that a Boko Haram cell led by Sadiku was behind the attack. (Note: Sadiku is the alias of cell leader Abubakar Saidu.)

== Aftermath ==
Following the attacks, police officers and soldiers were mobilised to carry out search-and-rescue operations. The Red Cross was not able to reach the villages, located in a remote region eight hours from the Kwara State capital.

Nigerian president Bola Tinubu announced the launch of Operation Savanna Shield, which included the deployment of a battalion to Kwara State and the appointment of a field commander to oversee the operation. Tinubu said the operation aimed to protect local villages and to "checkmate the barbaric terrorists".

At least 78 bodies were recovered by residents and buried on 4 February. The dead were buried in mass graves after funeral rites. By 5 February, only around 20 men were left in villages to bury the dead.

=== Reactions ===
President Tinubu called the attack "particularly disturbing" because the victims were killed for resisting "an attempt at forced indoctrination". He said the attackers were "heartless" and vowed that they would be brought to justice. Kwara State governor AbdulRahman AbdulRazaq called it a "brutal and deliberate massacre" motivated by extremism rather than banditry. He visited Woro and Nuku on 4 February, where he described the massacre as a genocide. Ademola Adeleke, the governor of neighbouring Osun State, gave his condolences to the victims and issued tightened security for border communities in his state.

The United States Department of State condemned the "horrific" attack and offered its condolences. Turkey also condemned the attack and vowed to continue supporting Nigeria in its operations against terrorism. United Nations secretary-general António Guterres gave his "heartfelt condolences" and called for the perpetrators to be brought to justice. The African Union and countries including Germany and Benin also issued statements of solidarity.

== Rescue ==
On 6 August 2026, the Kwara State Government announced that 163 people abducted during the massacre had been rescued by security forces during a joint operation. Authorities said a joint security operation led to the rescue of 308 abducted persons from Kwara and Niger States including 163 abducted victims during the Woro attack in Kwara State.
