= Bakura and Talata Mafara attacks =

Bandits attack in Zamfara State

- Part of Nigerian bandit conflict
- Location: Ruwan Gizo and Ruwan Gora, Bakura LGA, and 'Yargeda, Talata Mafara LGA, Zamfara State, Nigeria
- Date: 28–30 March 2022
- Victims: 5+ killed, several kidnapped
- Perpetrator: Katare

Between 28 and 30 March 2022, bandits attacked several villages in Bakura and Talata Mafara LGAs in Zamfara State, Nigeria, killing dozens of people, including the head of the village of 'Yargeda.

== Prelude ==
Throughout Zamfara state, there have been conflicts between civilians, the Nigerian army, and at least 100 different bandit groups. One gang, Katare, is the largest and most aggressive in the Bakura and Talata Mafara LGAs of Zamfara State. An attack by bandits in January 2022 in Anka LGA killed 200 people, the deadliest in the state. Many Katare bandits live in the village of Katsalle, not far away from the areas attacked on 30 March.

== Massacres ==
The first attacks began on 28 March, when Katare bandits attacked the villages of Ruwan Gizo, Ruwan Gora, Boraye, and Dajin Banza in Talata Mafara. Many people were kidnapped in the attacks, and the ex-Vice Chairman of the Talata Mafara council was killed in the attack.

Locals stated that around 11:45 at night, Katare bandits stormed the villages of Ruwan Gizo and Ruwan Gora, part of Talata Mafara LGA, and the village of 'Yargeda, under Bakura LGA, on motorcycles, and began shooting indiscriminately. Around 100 bandits participated, and blocked every exit to the town. The head of 'Yargeda, Abdu Umuru, was killed along with three others after the bandits stormed his house and shot everyone inside. The head of Talata Mafara, Aminu Sulaiman, called the local Nigerian military base for help during the attack but nobody picked up the phone. The full number of people killed was not able to be determined at the time because many people ran off into the bush. Several people were kidnapped as well, and the attack ended at 2:15 am.

== Aftermath ==
Following the attack, Zamfara State governor Bello Matawalle urged the residents to defend themselves against the bandits. The towns were visited by Hassan Nasiha, the deputy governor of the state, who expressed his condolences. The local Nigerian police had no comment on the attacks, and urged civilians to call the military if attacked again.
