= Lakurawa =

Nigerian Islamist armed group

- Lakurawa
- Leader: Ameer Habib Tajje
- Dates active: c. 2010 – present
- Allegiance: Islamic State
- Active regions: Northern Nigeria; Mali; Niger
- Ideology: Islamic Statism: Salafi Jihadism; Islamism
- Size: 3,000
- Part of: Islamic State – Sahel Province
- Wars: War in the Sahel; Boko Haram insurgency; Islamist insurgency in Niger; Islamist insurgency in Benin; Nigerian bandit conflict

Lakurawa, (Note: The name Lakurawa comes from a Hausa adaptation of the French phrase les recrues, meaning 'the recruits'; IPA: [lá.kú.ɽá.wá]) also known as simply Lakur, is an armed group operating in Mali, Niger, and Nigeria. Their activities are concentrated in five local government areas (LGAs) of Sokoto State, namely: Tangaza, Gudu, Illela, Binji, and Silame. Initially founded as a self-defence group to fight criminals in the Nigerian bandit conflict, the group became increasingly radical, oppressive, and opposed to regular state agencies. Lakurawa was described as a terrorist group in 2024.

== History ==
Lakurawa reportedly first emerged in the Gongono Forest of Tangaza in 2018. According to other sources, Lakurawa has existed since 2016 or 2017, and the Nigerian government was reportedly aware of its existence. Another source claims they had existed since 2010. The group initially presented itself as a self-defense force, set up to help communities in northern Nigeria to defend themselves from increasingly frequent bandit attacks. Feeling abandoned by the Nigerian security forces, many locals welcomed Lakurawa's rise at first, but the group became increasingly radical and oppressive over time. Concentrating on other targets, the Nigerian security forces tolerated the militia during its first years.

By 2017, Lakurawa had established a base near the Gudu and Tangaza LGAs, about 60 miles from Sokoto city. Starting with fewer than 50 local youths, its ranks swelled to over 200, mainly young men aged 18 to 35, drawn in by stipends and radical teachings. Members emphasized purity, adopted heterodox and esoteric interpretations of Islam, and deliberately distanced themselves from mainstream society. They established Darul Islam camps in the villages of Gwangwano, Mulawa, Wansaniya, and Tunigara, along the Nigeria–Niger border. After the militant group tried to embed itself in Sokoto, a joint Nigerian-Nigerien offensive rooted them out.

By 2023, Lakurawa had become a greater problem to many northern Nigerian communities than the bandits, as it raised taxes, attacked security forces, imposed Islamist laws, and killed civilians. In November 2024, the militia was officially called a terrorist group by Nigerian authorities; by this point, it had some presence in an area covering about 500 villages. In the same month, militants of the group attacked Mera village in the Augie LGA of Kebbi State, where they killed 15–25 people.

In September 2024, UN reporting confirmed that Lakurawa, also referred to locally as Lukarawa, had re-emerged in northern Kebbi and northwest Sokoto, with suspected affiliations to the Islamic State in the Greater Sahara. The group had entered Nigeria from Mali in 2017, initially as a vigilante force. It was expelled by Nigerian forces in 2022, retreating into Niger, where it established a logistics hub near Birni-N'Konni and an operational base in Serma, Tahoua Region.

The group's fighters, estimated at over 200, include members from Burkina Faso, Mali, and Niger. They are heavily armed with small arms, light weapons, explosives, surveillance drones, and satellite communications equipment. It has also sought to recruit criminal bandits in Zamfara State to bolster its strength and establish an Islamic state in northwestern Nigeria.

On 11 March 2025, militants from the group attacked Birnin Dede and six villages near the border with Niger, Kebbi state police spokesman Nafiu Abubakar said, to avenge the killing of their commander by security forces in the area. On 1 July, militants believed to be members of Lakurawa launched a raid on Kwallajiya, a village in Tangaza. Many villagers were preparing for afternoon prayers, with many victims working on their farms.

On 25 December the United States conducted strikes on Sokoto State. U.S. president Donald Trump announced on social media that the strikes were targeted against "ISIS terrorist scum." A local official in the Tangaza area claims that some Lakurawa camps were hit but that the death toll was unclear.

On 4 February 2026, militants of the Lakurawa group attacked the villages of Woro and Nuku in Kwara State killing 162 civilians. The attack happened after the villagers denied the group's demand to implement their version of sharia.

== Leadership, beliefs, and organization ==
Ameer Habib Tajje serves as the leader of Lakurawa. He made headlines by releasing a warning to the bandit leader Bello Turji, urging him to end his criminal activities. Lakurawa claims to protect against bandits but imposes strict religious laws, and youths have been beaten for shaving their beards, having certain hairstyles, or listening to music. They enforce zakat payment, confiscating cattle from non-compliers. Similar to Boko Haram, they communicate in Tamajaq, Zabarmanci, Bambara, and Hausa. Lakurawa recruits youths with ₦1,000,000.

The name Lakurawa comes from a Hausa adaptation of the French word les recrues, meaning 'the recruits'. The Lakurawa flag includes the Arabic phrase "Al-Jihad fi Sabil Allah" ("Jihad in the cause of God"). At its center, within a red circle, is a stylized insect-like figure. People interviewed said they did not know the meaning or origin of the logo's design.
