= Isiya Danwasa =

Nigerian gang leader

- Died: 11 April 2023; Igabi, Kaduna State, Nigeria
- Military career
- Allegiance: Isiya Danwasa's gang
- Rank: Founder and commander
- Conflicts: Nigerian bandit conflict: Operation Forest Sanity †

Isiya Danwasa was a Nigerian bandit leader who led a gang that operated in Kaduna State, Nigeria, until his death in April 2023.

== Biography ==
The origins of Danwasa's gang are unknown, although he operated primarily in Kaduna State, expanding his operations as far as Igabi, Chikun, and Birnin Gwari LGAs. In these areas he had been accused of perpetrating several killings and cattle thefts, common among gangs in northern Nigeria. Danwasa's group was smaller compared to other gangs in the area, such as Dogo Giɗe and Bello Turji.

Danwasa was killed on 11 April 2023 after he had sent a servant out to the main town of Igabi to fetch supplies. His servant was followed by plain-clothes Nigerian soldiers, who ambushed Danwasa in a firefight. Nigerian forces commended the operation as a major success of Operation Forest Sanity. Kaduna governor Nasir El-Rufai also congratulated the Nigerian soldiers.
