= May 2022 Bakura massacres =

2022 massacre of civilians in Nigeria

- Part of Nigerian bandit conflict
- Location: Sabon Garin Damri, Damri, and Kalahe, Bakura LGA, Zamfara State, Nigeria
- Date: 6 May 2022
- Deaths: 56
- Injuries: Several
- Perpetrator: Unknown

On 6 May 2022, unknown gunmen attacked the villages of Sabon Garin Damri, Damri, and Kalahe in Bakura LGA, Zamfara State, Nigeria, killing at least 56 people.

== Background ==
Bakura LGA in Zamfara state has been a hotspot of gang activity from armed groups, who storm villages and kill dozens of civilians at a time and kidnap civilians for ransom. Between 28 and 30 March, the gang Katare killed dozens of civilians in Bakura and Talata Mafara.

== Massacres ==
At about 2:30pm on 6 May, dozens of gunmen stormed the town of Sabon Garin Damri on motorcycles. At the time, many people were in the village and the nearby villages of Damri and Kalahe celebrating Eid al-Fitr with their families. A witness speaking to Sahara Reporters said that Sabon Garin Damri had the most casualties, with 48 people being massacred there. Three others were killed in Damri, including a child. However, the head of Bakura told France 24 that Damri was the worst hit, with 32 people killed there. Nigerian police entered the villages while the attackers were looting, repelling the attackers with only two policemen killed. One Hilux used by the police was destroyed.

== Aftermath ==
Nigerian officials vowed to arrest and bring the perpetrators to justice. Just 28 hours after the massacres, seven people were killed in Faru and Kauyen Minane villages in nearby Maradun LGA. No group claimed responsibility for the attack, nor did the Nigerian government name a group.
