= Zamfara attack =

Zamfara attack may refer to:

- Zamfara kidnapping, in February 2021
- Zurmi massacre, in June 2021
- 2022 Zamfara massacres, in January 2022
