= Sani Alhaji Yakubu =

Nigerian politician

Member of the House of Representatives of Nigeria
- In office 2023–incumbent
- Constituency: Gudu/Tangaza Federal Constituency

Personal details
- Party: All Progressives Congress
- Education: Bachelor of Science in Political Science
- Alma mater: Usmanu Danfodiyo University

Sani Alhaji Yakubu (born 1 January 1977) is a Nigerian politician who serves as a Member of the House of Representatives of Nigeria, representing the Gudu/Tangaza Federal Constituency of Sokoto State on the platform of the All Progressives Congress (APC).

== Early life and education ==
Yakubu was born on 1 January 1977 in Gudu Local Government Area, Sokoto State. He holds a Bachelor of Science degree in Political Science from Usmanu Danfodiyo University, Sokoto.

== Political career ==
Yakubu was elected to the House of Representatives to represent Gudu/Tangaza Federal Constituency in June 2025.

== Abduction ==
In February 2019, Yakubu was abducted by unknown gunmen along the Kware–Illela expressway. The Sokoto State Police Command confirmed the incident and stated that security agencies had commenced investigations into the abduction.

== Controversies ==
In March 2025, the Sokoto State Government and Tangaza Local Government Council rejected a proposal attributed to Yakubu to convert the Gidan Madi Stadium in Tangaza into a market. State officials clarified that an acknowledgment of receipt of a letter from the lawmaker did not amount to approval of the proposal and urged residents to disregard reports suggesting government consent.

== See also ==
- House of Representatives of Nigeria
- Sokoto State House of Assembly
