= 2023 Mutunji kidnapping =

- Part of Nigerian bandit conflict
- Location: Mutunji and other villages, Maru LGA, Zamfara State, Nigeria
- Date: November 24, 2023; 7:30pm
- Deaths: 17+
- Victim: 150-178 kidnapped
- Perpetrator: Damina

On November 24, 2023, a bandit group led by Damina kidnapped 150 civilians and killed one in an attack on several villages near Mutunji, Maru LGA, Zamfara State, Nigeria. Ten of the victims later died of hunger, and seven more died in a failed escape attempt.

== Background ==
Bandit groups in northern Nigeria's Zamfara State often extort local communities for cash and protection from other competing bandit groups. When communities don't pay up, kidnappings and killings are common. The local government area of Maru includes an area called Mutunji, which has 43 villages. There are no security personnel active in Mutunji, and ten of the villages are fully under bandit control. The main bandit group in Mutunji is led by Damina.

== Kidnapping ==
The first kidnapping took place in the village of Ruwan-Dorawa, when bandits raided a wedding and kidnapped the bride and the wife of the village's leader. The abduction lasted for four hours, and one off-duty policeman was killed trying to stop it. About 150 bandits, led by a leader named Dan Nagala, took part in the operation. The bandits demanded 100 million naira from the victims' families, but the families were only able to raise 5 million naira. After the Ruwan-Dorawa kidnapping, the bandits threatened villagers in Mutunji and other communities that they would be next.

On November 24, Daily Trust reported that Damina's bandits kidnapped 18 people in Mutunji, 32 in Kwanar-Dutse, 22 in Sabon-Garin Mahuta, and 20 in Gama-Giwa. Another report by the International Center for Investigative Reporting (ICIR) said that 178 people were kidnapped at a mosque and night market in Mutunji. The residents were kidnapped for not paying a 200 million naira ransom to Damina and his men. The kidnapping began at about 7:30pm, and once everyone was captured Damina's men screened and released all females and minors, leaving 48 men in captivity. Two men were killed not far from the village.

After a week, one of the captive men came out with a letter demanding a ransom of 110 million naira for the captives' release. In the letter, Damina accused the locals of inviting the military to bomb his men. By this point, ten of the men had died in captivity from hunger. Damina also threatened to attack Mutunji and the village of Malele again.

On December 10, Nigerian jets struck Damina's base and killed many of his men. While the bombing was carried out, the captives attempted to escape but failed. Seven of the escapees were killed, although two men managed to make it to a hospital. In response, Damina attacked Mutunji and Malele at 5pm on the dot that day. 71 civilians and dozens of Damina's men were killed in a Nigerian army bombing on Malele.

== Aftermath ==
After the kidnapping, most of Mutunji and it's villages' population fled. Those who remained have taken up arms in self-defense against Damina's group. 1,500 children in the communities are out of school as the two schools shut down.

Damina was killed in March 2024 in clashes with the Nigerian army.
