= 2025 Kwallajiya attack =

Militant attack

- Part of the Nigerian bandit conflict and Terrorism in Nigeria
- Location: Kwallajiya, Sokoto State, Nigeria
- Date: 1 July 2025
- Deaths: 15–17 (Varying by source)
- Injuries: "several"
- Perpetrators: Islamic State – Sahel Province; (Islamic State) Lakurawa

On 1 July 2025, militants believed to be members of the Lakurawa group launched a raid on Kwallajiya, a village in the Tangaza Local Government Area of Sokoto State, Nigeria. Many were preparing for afternoon prayers, with many victims working on their farms.

== Background ==
Lakurawa is an armed group affiliated with the Islamic State Sahel Province operating in Mali, Niger, and Kebbi and Sokoto states of Nigeria. Their activities are concentrated in five LGAs of Sokoto state, namely: Tangaza, Gudu, Illela, Binji, and Silame. Initially founded as a self-defense group to fight criminals in the Nigerian bandit conflict, the group eventually became increasingly radical, oppressive, and opposed to regular state agencies. Lakurawa was described as a "terrorist" group in 2024.

== Attack ==
Eyewitness accounts describe attackers entering the village and firing indiscriminately before setting homes, farmlands, and telecommunications infrastructure on fire, leaving at least 15-17 dead and several people injured. Many victims were preparing for afternoon prayers, with many also working on their farms.

Residents believe that the assault served as retaliation for the recent deaths of three jihadists at the hands of local vigilantes who thwarted a previous raid.
