= Bello Turji =

Nigerian bandit leader

Bello Turji Kachalla
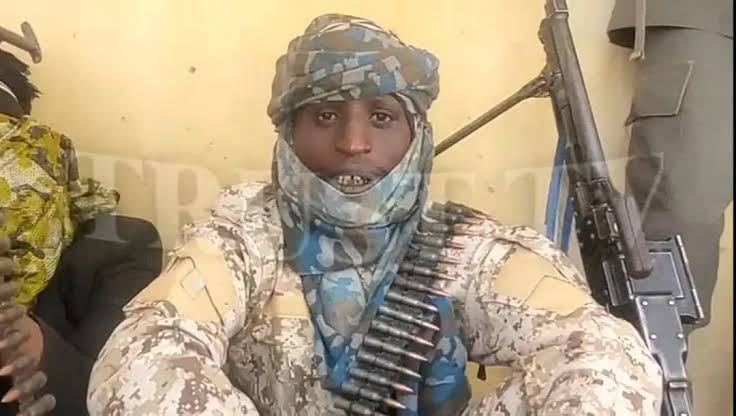
- Born: Bello Usmana; 1994 (age 31–32); Shinkafi, Zamfara State, Nigeria
- Military career
- Allegiance: Banditry
- Service years: 2011 to date
- Rank: Terrorist, Bandit leader
- Conflicts: Nigerian bandit conflict; United States intervention in Nigeria; Boko Haram insurgency

Bello Turji Kachalla, popularly known simply as Turji, (born 1994) is a notorious Nigerian bandit leader operating in North-western Nigeria, particularly Zamfara, Sokoto and Niger states. In 2022, a bandit gang led by Turji carried out a series of massacres in Zamfara, resulting in the deaths of nearly 200 innocent people, including women and children.

== Early life ==
Turji was born in Shinkafi local government of Zamfara State, Northern Nigeria. Turji was raised as a Fulani cattle herder without education. Turji claims that some of his family's cattle were stolen by a pro-security forces vigilante group called the Ƴan Sakai who also murdered six of Turji's siblings. Turji also claims his father tried to sue the Emir of Zurmi (to whom the stolen cattle were given) but his efforts failed, and that the Yan Sakai killed his uncle. Turji told the Daily Trust in an interview that this had prompted him to take up arms.

== Career ==
Bello Turji is known to have been responsible for numerous massacres and terrorist attacks against civilians and security forces in the North West region of the country, especially Zamfara and Sokoto states.

In September 2021, the Yan Sakai attacked a mosque in Gwadabawa, killing eleven people. Turji responded by leading his bandits towards a market in Goronyo, Sokoto State. The bandits entered the bazaar and opened fire, killing at least 50 to over 60 civilians. In December 2021, Turji's forces attacked a bus in Sabon Birni, setting it on fire and burning the passengers inside to death with 30 people dying in the ambush.

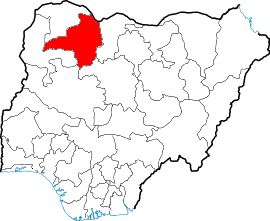
Zamfara state Map

Turji was the mastermind behind the slaughter of over 200 people in Zamfara state in January 2022.

He is a rival of another bandit leader named Dogo Giɗe.

On 25 December 2025, during the U.S. strikes in Sokoto State, Isa, Bello Turji’s stronghold, was hit killing an unknown number of bandits.

== Links to former governor and defense minister ==
Bello Turji allegedly has links to Dr. Bello Matawalle, the former Zamfara State governor and current minister of state for defense in the Tinubu administration. Turji reportedly stated that he and other bandit leaders received 34 new hilux trucks purchased for them by governor Matawalle in 2019.

== Political views ==
Turji believes that Fulani people are being subjected to genocide in Nigeria, and has justified his actions as being reprisals against attacks on Fulani bandits and civilians. Bello Turji believes the security issues in Nigeria have been politicized and that the government is not treating the ethnic groups in the country equally. He stressed that even the media discriminates against the Fulanis and never reports the killing of innocent Fulanis. He claimed that all he wants is peace to reign in the country.

== Public image ==
Bello Turji is one of the best-known Nigerian bandits and enjoys a heavy amount of publicity from the media. A Hausa-language song surfaced online depicting a man singing while chanting women in the background describing the bandit as a "hero among heroes."

== See also ==
- 2022 Zamfara massacres
- Nigerian bandit conflict
