= 2022 Angwar Ma'ji and Maido attacks =

Bandit attacks in Nigeria

- Location: Angwar Ma'ji, Kagarko LGA and Maido District, Kachia LGA, Kaduna State, Nigeria
- Date: 4 April 2022; 11pm
- Deaths: 17 killed (Maido); 22 kidnapped (Angwar Ma'ji)
- Injuries: 7 injured
- Perpetrator: Unknown bandits

On 4 April 2022, unknown bandits attacked five villages in Maido District, Kachia LGA and Angwar Ma'ji, Kagarko LGA, Kaduna State, Nigeria, killing 17 people in the villages of Maido Rafi, Abrom, Kabobe, and Ankwa, and kidnapping 22 people in the village of Angwar Ma'ji.

== Background ==
Kaduna State has been a hotspot of banditry from various groups since the start of the 2010s. Many of these bandit groups utilize attacks on villages, kidnappings for ransom, and cattle rustling as methods to obtain money and power in the state. Bandit attacks killed 13 people in Anka LGA of Zamfara State on 31 March, and a train from Abuja to Kaduna was attacked in late March 2022.

On the same day of the attacks, at least 20 soldiers were killed in an Ansaru attack on a Nigerian military base in Birnin Gwari, Kaduna State.

== Attacks ==
At around 11pm on 4 April, armed bandits, some dressed in Nigerian military uniforms, attacked the town of Angwar Ma'ji, in Kagarko LGA near the Abuja-Kaduna highway. The militants immediately opened fire before moving from house to house to kidnap people, and shot into the air while fleeing to deter residents from chasing after them. Civilians in Angwar Ma'ji believed that the bandits were initially Nigerian soldiers due to the uniforms, and the victims did not realize they were being kidnapped until they were being led out of the village. The bandits remained in Angwar Ma'ji for over an hour before fleeing. One of the hostages was able to escape while the perpetrators were fleeing.

In Maido District of Kachia LGA, also in Kaduna State, that same night the four villages of Maido Rafi, Abrom, Kabobe, and Ankwa were attacked by unknown bandits. Local sources reported that at least 17 people were killed and seven more were injured and bein treated at local hospitals.

== Aftermath ==
Following the Angwar Ma'ji kidnapping, Kaduna officials said that they would deploy more security along the Abuja-Kaduna highway.
