= Sokoto bus massacre =

- Part of the Nigerian bandit conflict
- Location: Sokoto State
- Date: December 7, 2021
- Deaths: 30

On 7 December 2021, armed men attacked a bus in Sokoto State in northwestern Nigeria. The gunmen, apparently part of a bandit group, ambushed the vehicle on a road between Sabon Birni and Gidan Bawa. They set fire to the bus, killing about 30 people.
