= Sabon Birni massacres =

2020 massacres in Sabon Birni, Sokoto State, Nigeria

- Part of Nigerian bandit conflict
- Location: Garki, Kazuri, Dan a'dua, Kafi, Katuma, Masawa, Sabon Birni LGA, Sokoto State, Nigeria
- Date: 26 May 2020; 3-5pm
- Target: Garki civilians
- Deaths: 74+: 13+ in Dan a'dua; 25 in Kuzari; 6 in Kafi; 6 in Katuma; 5 in Masawa; 25 in Garki
- Injuries: Unknown
- Perpetrator: Fulani bandit groups (per Sokoto authorities)

On 26 May 2020, over seventy-four people were killed on multiple attacks in villages in Sabon Birni LGA in Sokoto State, Nigeria. The attacks were a campaign of reprisal attacks targeting Garki, and came after the massacre of nineteen civilians by bandits in Sabon Birni a week prior.

== Background ==
Bandits have ravaged Sokoto State and other parts of Nigeria for years, including predominantly Hausa areas of the country. These bandit conflicts have ethnic undertones, with Fulani herdsmen making up a large portion of bandit and sometimes jihadist groups against Hausa vigilante groups that are farmers. Fulani bandits often feel marginalized by the Nigerian government with land reform shrinking their livelihood. Each of the eleven wards of Sabon Birni has areas under control of bandits.

Just a week prior to the Sabon Birni massacres, the governor of Sokoto State Aminu Tambuwal came to the LGA to express his condolences for a massacre by bandits that killed nineteen people. He also talked with security officials on how to reinforce the region.

On 22 May, police in the village of Garki in Sabon Birni LGA killed two bandits. Survivors of the massacres stated that the residents were aware of the bandits planning reprisal attacks against Garki, and called the police ahead of time. No action was taken by Nigerian police before the massacres. Prior to the attack, the bandits sought help from sympathetic locals in the towns of Isa and Bafarawa in Sokoto and Maradun in Zamfara State.

== Massacres ==
The bandits began a campaign of violence on their way to Garki. A police officer stated that between three and five in the evening, the department received a call that around 150 motorcycles with two men on each were heading through multiple villages on their way to Garki. The bandits came from the Issah forest, near the villages. The first town hit was Dan a'dua, with at least thirteen people killed and many more missing. Bandits then attacked Kuzari, killing at least twenty-five people including the town's imam. In Kafi, six people were killed, in Katuma, six people were killed as well, and in Masawa, five people were killed. Survivors from Garki stated that they received phone calls from the other villages during the attacks warning them of what was happening.

The worst-hit town was Garki. The bandits surrounded the village first, and shot at everyone they could. A survivor noted that unlike past raids, the bandits did not steal anything this time, instead just shooting at people. At least twenty-five people were killed in the Garki massacre.

== Aftermath ==
At least seventy-four people were killed in the massacres, and many others were injured. Hundreds of displaced survivors from Garki and other villages fled to Sabon Birni, the capital of the LGA, seeking safety and shelter. Many refugees were sleeping on the streets. Other refugees fled to Niger. The activist group Coalition of Concerned Sokoto Citizens stated that the region was becoming anarchic as bandit groups from Katsina State and Zamfara State migrated towards Sokoto. Sabon Birni LGA, on the border with Niger, was becoming a hotspot of violence because of these migrations.

A resident of Garki identified the bandits as the same ones that had recently attacked the villages of Gangara, 'Yar Bulutu, and Garin Buture villages around the LGA. A police captain in the region stated that there simply weren't enough resources to protect the LGA from the bandits. He also stated that while residents reported attacks to the police, reprisal attacks would occur before the police had a chance to respond. He also accused Fulani bandits that were not herdsmen of perpetrating the attack due to the attackers speaking Fulfulde.

A second attack targeted Gatawa, another village expecting reprisal attacks, on 30 May killing four people, injuring several, and kidnapping dozens. Sokoto sultan Alhaji Muhammad Saadu Abubakar III urged the governor of Sokoto to protect the area.
