= Mahuta kidnapping =

December 2020 Child abduction part of the Nigerian bandit conflict

- Part of Nigerian bandit conflict
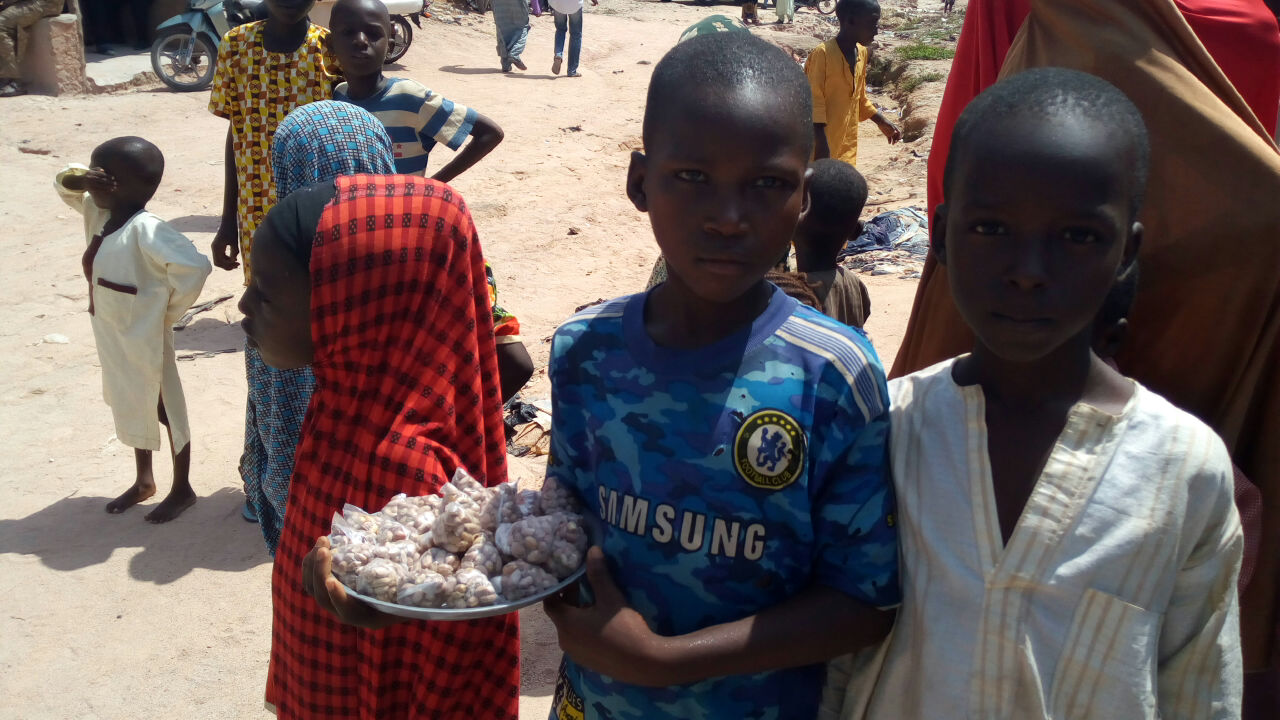
- Children in Katsina State, Nigeria
- Date: December 2020
- Target: Students from Hizburrahim Islamiyya Madrasa
- Attack type: Abduction
- Perpetrator: Nigerian bandits

In Dec 2020, over 80 children from the Madrasa of Hizburrahim Islamiyya were kidnapped (Note: The children had finished attending a religious ceremony and were returning to their homes when they were abducted.) in Katsina, Nigeria. They were rescued by pro-government vigilantes after a siege and subsequent gun battle with the kidnappers.

In addition to the 80 children rescued, an additional 33 children who had been kidnapped earlier were freed by vigilantes.

== Responsibility ==
Boko Haram claimed to be behind the abductions, but critics said the organization was not telling the truth. Local politicians instead laid blame on bandits, and were agreed with by experts.
