= Sani Abdullahi Shinkafi =

Nigerian politician

Personal details
- Born: Shinkafi, Shinkafi LGA, Zamfara State
- Party: All Progressives Congress
- Other political affiliations: All Progressives Grand Alliance (2002–2021)
- Education: Nasarawa State University
- Occupation: Politician
- Nickname: Wamban Shinkafi

Sani Abdullahi Shinkafi, is a Nigerian politician and the current honorary special adviser on inter-governmental affairs to the governor of Zamfara State, Bello Matawalle. He previously served as the national secretary of All Progressives Grand Alliance.

== Early life and education ==
Shinkafi was born in Shinkafi, Shinkafi LGA, Zamfara State. From 1976 to 1982, he went to Shinkafi Township Primary School, Zamfara State, before going to Government Secondary School, Gwadabawa, Sokoto State where he studied from 1982 to 1988. He went to Sokoto State Polytechnic and later to the School of Management Studies, Birnin Kebbi, Kebbi State in 1991 and received a national diploma in business administration. In 1998, Shinkafi received higher national diploma in accounting and finance from Plateau School of Accountancy and Management Studies, Jos. He received a postgraduate diploma in education from National Teachers Institute, Kaduna State in 2008, before receiving a master's in public sectors account from Nasarawa State University.

== Career ==
Shinkafi started his career by working with the government of Sokoto State as an accountant in training with the ministry of agriculture and national resources in the state. In 1992, he was promoted to internal auditor ii and was later transferred to Sokoto State construction company where he worked as acting deputy director, internal audit. After the creation of Zamfara State in 1996, he was transferred to the ministry of finance, budget and economic planning in the state. In 2001, he voluntarily resigned from his position and joined the private sector.

Shinkafi later joined politics and went on to become the governorship candidate of All Progressives Grand Alliance in the 2007, 2011, 2015 and 2019 gubernatorial elections in Zamfara State. In 2015, he came third in the governorship election that saw Abdul'aziz Abubakar Yari re-elected for a second and final term. In 2019, he came fourth in the governorship election. He is the current chairman of Patriots for Advancement of Peace and Social Development, (PAPSD). Shinkafi is a former national secretary of All Progressives Grand Alliance and the current secretary of the party's board of trustees.

In June 2020, he was appointed honorary special adviser on inter-governmental affairs to the governor of Zamfara State, Bello Matawalle. Until his appointment as honorary special adviser, he was a member of Zamfara State committee for finding solution to armed banditry created by governor Matawalle to tackle insecurity in the state. On 29 June 2021, Shinkafi joined All Progressives Congress.
