= 2022 Zamfara massacres =

Series of mass murders in Northwest Nigeria

- Location: Zamfara, Nigeria
- Date: 4-6 January 2022
- Target: civilians
- Attack type: massacre
- Deaths: 200+
- Injuries: unknown

From 4 to 6 January 2022, over 200 people were killed by bandits in Zamfara State, Nigeria in a series of massacres. This was the deadliest terrorist attack in recent Nigerian history.

== Background ==
The Nigerian bandit conflict, in which thousands of people have been killed, began in 2011 and is linked to the farmer-herder conflicts and the Boko Haram insurgency. Bandit gangs carry out attacks in several northwestern states, including mass kidnappings and massacres. Attacks in Zamfara State in 2021 included the kidnapping of 279 secondary schoolgirls in Jangebe in February and the massacre of over 50 villagers in Zurmi in June.

Prior to the attacks, airstrikes by government forces on 3 January resulted in the deaths of over 100 bandits and the destruction of numerous bases. This led to bandits being pushed forward into the region, where they carried out reprisal attacks. A few days later the Nigerian government formally designated the bandits as terrorists, in order to bring tougher sanctions against convicted attackers, their informants and supporters.

== Massacres ==
Shortly before the attacks, bandits led a raid on a group of 3,000 cattle only to be confronted by local vigilantes, leading to a gunfight and battle between the two parties. The outnumbered vigilantes lost and many of them were slain by bandits, and the killings of villagers began.

Beginning around 12:45 pm, on Tuesday, 4 January, bandit gunmen on motorcycles whose numbers have been estimated from 300 to 500 entered the town of Kurfar Danya, marking the start of a series of attacks on villages in the Anka and Bukkuyum local government areas of Zamfara. Gangs shot at villagers while looting and burning their homes to the ground. For two days, armed bandits laid siege to the towns of Kurfa and Rafin-Gero without an intervention by the government. Five separate settlements were destroyed by the bandits. One survivor described the bandits as shooting "anyone on sight."

The massacres ended on Thursday, 6 January, after military forces intercepted bandits. A bandit leader named Bello Turji was accused of being responsible for the massacres.

List of settlements confirmed targeted
Name	Date attacked	Details	References
Kurfar Danya	4 January	First to be targeted; population displaced	
Rafin Danya	4 January	Destroyed	
Barayar Zaki	4 January		
Rafin Gero	4 January	Besieged, destroyed	
Waramu			
Tungar Isa		Destroyed	
Kewaye			
Tungar Na More			

== Victims ==
Zamfara State authorities placed the death toll at 58, but this was widely controversial. Some internally displaced people stated the number of people killed as 154. A spokesperson for Sadiya Umar Farouq, the minister of humanitarian affairs, said that more than 200 bodies were buried, a number also reported by local residents. Among the victims of the killings was Gambo Abare, a prominent leader of anti-bandit vigilante groups.

== Aftermath ==
Over 10,000 people became Internally displaced persons and five settlements were burned down. Many resources were stolen, with an estimated 2,000 cattle being taken by bandits. Nigerian authorities arrived to the districts to help organize mass burials, and are still active. As of January 10, many people were still missing, and relief efforts were ongoing.

The Nigerian government and police have launched a manhunt for the perpetrators, employing military aircraft.

Attacks by bandits have not ceased, and on January 10, bandits stormed the Zamfaran village of Yar Kuka, abducting twelve people, including the village head, his wife and brother, and two miners from Burkina Faso. The next day, bandits raided Kadauri in Maru LGA, kidnapping six women. On January 11 bandits slaughtered 51 civilians from Plateau and Niger States in a similar incident.

On January 12, Zamfara governor Bello Matawalle announced that lack of security had become "an existential threat" in the state and the North-West of Nigeria as a whole, and demanded that the federal government involve itself further in the conflict.

== Reactions ==
=== Nigeria ===
On 8 January, Nigerian president Muhammadu Buhari condemned the murders, adding that Nigeria would seek to crack down on terrorism in the country. Former Secretary to the Government of the Federation Anyim Pius Anyim said he was saddened by the killings, denouncing "the destruction of lives and property" by the perpetrators.

The Emirs of Anka and Bukkuyum, Alhaji Attahir Ahmad and Alhaji Muhammad Usman respectively, promoted heavier security presence in the area. Bello Matawalle immediately took a visit to the towns affected, meeting and talking to survivors and their families. He criticized the media for purportedly exaggerating casualty estimates, saying the media "have variously quoted scary figures of deaths arising from the recent attacks by fleeing bandits."

The All Progressives Congress condemned the incident, stating it would support the Nigerian Armed Forces in its quest to track down the perpetrators. John James Akpan Udo-Edehe extended "heartfelt condolences to the families that lost loved ones and commiserates with the government and people of Zamfara state" on behalf of the party.

The Nigeria Labour Congress denounced the massacres and the "wickedness and inhumanity" the bandits had caused.

Femi Fani-Kayode, who previously served as Nigeria's Aviation ministry, proposed that Nigeria could prevent future massacres by adopting the practice of carpet bombing, noting that the military had recently acquired Tucano jets. The governor of Kaduna State, Nasir Ahmad el-Rufai, also supported using the method.

They kill people in Sokoto, you mobilise the army there, and chase them out, they move to Kebbi, from Kebbi if they are bombed, they move to Kaduna. What should be done is to bomb them from the air, ground, troops on the ground at the same time in all five, six states of the North West plus Niger. And this problem can be sorted out in my view, in weeks. I believe the levels of insecurity now are at a tipping point and something is got to give. My hope is that what will give is the end of this banditry once and for all. It is a problem.

-Nasir Ahmad el-Rufai

António Guterres
(@antonioguterres)
tweeted:

I strongly condemn the appalling attacks perpetrated over the weekend in Nigeria’s Zamfara State in which many civilians were killed. I urge the Nigerian authorities to spare no effort in bringing those responsible for these heinous crimes to justice.

10 Jan 2022

=== International ===
The Turkish Ministry of Foreign Affairs responded it was "deeply saddened to receive the news that over one hundred civilians lost their lives during several attacks in the Zamfara State."

On 10 January, Secretary-General of the United Nations António Guterres expressed sharp condemnation of the incident, lending support to anti-terror operations in Nigeria, telling Nigerian authorities to "spare no effort in bringing those responsible for these heinous crimes to justice". Guterres reaffirmed UN solidarity with the country.

The Organization of Islamic Cooperation denounced the incident, expressing empathy to the victims.

The Egyptian Foreign Ministry sent condolences and condemned the massacres as terrorist attacks.
