= Gidan Madi =

Gidan Madi Ta ausa maikamar rassallah
- LGA
- Location within Nigeria
- Coordinates: 13°17′52″N 4°58′09″E
- Country: Nigeria
- State: Sokoto State
- LGA: Tangaza

Government
  - Ausan Gidanmadi: Alh shehu Abubakar Ausa
- Time zone: UTC+1 (WAT)
- 3-digit postal code prefix: 841

Gidan Madi is a city in Sokoto State and the head quarter of Tangaza Local Government Area in Sokoto State, Nigeria, close to the town of Sutti.

It is the headquarters of the LGA, and the Post Office of the LGA is also located there.
