= February 2021 Kaduna and Katsina attacks =

Criminal attacks in Nigeria

- Part of Nigerian bandit conflict
- Location: Kaduna State and Katsina State, Nigeria
- Date: 24–28 February 2021
- Deaths: 97
- Injuries: Unknown

On 24 and 25 February 2021, bandits killed 36 people in Kaduna and Katsina State of Nigeria.

The series of armed attacks were perpetrated by a gang of bandits in villages in Kaduna and Katsina states in Nigeria. The gunmen burned down houses, killing 18 people in each state and injuring several others.

After a further attack killed 7 more, another source put the total death toll at 97.
