= Balle, Nigeria =

Balle
- Town
- Location within Nigeria
- Coordinates: 13°28′09″N 4°40′53″E
- Country: Nigeria
- State: Sokoto State
- LGA: Gudu
- Time zone: UTC+1 (WAT)

Balle is a town in Sokoto State, Nigeria. It is the headquarters of Gudu Local Government Area.

Balle is located about 36 kilometres from the town of Tangaza, and approximately 97 kilometres from Sokoto.

Balle is situated at the eastern part of Gudu, some 40 km southeast of Kurdula town, and Karfen-Sarki town is located 30 km Southwest, Bachaka town about 70 km westward. Been it the headquarters of Gudu Local Government many public and Government buildings are located in the town. Such as Local Government Secretariat, Governor's Lodge, staff quarters and so on.

Balle is also hometown of one of the three Sokoto state Government Boarding Primary Schools, the newly constructed Senior Secondary School, Junior Secondary School and Models Primary School Balle.

== Language and tribe ==
The Residents of Balle are combination of Hausa and Fulani, Hausa language is predominantly spoken, and Fulbe language is also widely spoken by residents.
