= Yan Sakai =

Group of volunteers security in northern Nigeria

The Ƴan-Sakai are a vigilante group active in northwest of Nigeria. The group contains mostly Hausa farmers, and was created by the local people to protect themselves against bandits.

Members of the group have been accused of perpetrating extrajudicial violence, torture, and killings against the Fulani herdsmen of Nigeria. In response, some Fulani pastoralists created their own group, the Yan Bindiga. The group is believed to be responsible for the killing of Fulani activist Alhaji Isheyyi.

In 2020, they were ordered to disband by the governor of Zamfara State, Bello Matawalle. After continued violence by Yan Sakai and Yan Bindiga, the Zamfara state launched an offensive against them, blocking telecommunications and the sale of portable gas canisters.

The group has access to weapons such as guns, rocket-propelled grenades, and anti-aircraft guns.

== See also ==
- Nigerian bandit conflict
- Herder–farmer conflicts in Nigeria
