= Critical Threats Project =

American research organization

- Abbreviation: CTP
- Formation: 2009; 17 years ago
- Founder: Frederick Kagan
- Type: Open-source intelligence research
- Location: Washington, D.C., United States
- Parent organization: American Enterprise Institute

The Critical Threats Project (CTP), also referred to simply as Critical Threats, is a research organization and think tank operated by the American Enterprise Institute. Founded in 2009 by military analyst Frederick Kagan, its primary goals are to provide information on threats and conflicts of concern to the United States in order to advise the public, mainstream media, and policymakers.

== Background and work ==
According to Kagan, who serves as the groups director, Critical Threats delivers "intelligence community-type tradecraft and standards" while exclusively utilizing open-source intelligence. The organization is divided into two main analytical teams; one focusing on Iran, including its internal and external affairs, and the other on Salafi jihadist groups, particularly those operating in Africa but also those in the Middle East such as in Yemen, Iraq and Syria.

== Publications and partnerships ==
Critical Threats has partnered with the Institute for the Study of War, and has delivered joint updates with it on the Russo-Ukrainian war since 2022. The Institute for the Study of War and AEI's Critical Threats Project have served as sources for reporting on battlefield developments in the Russo-Ukrainian War. The organizations also jointly publish the Iran Update, a periodical report covering foreign and domestic political developments involving Iran and conflicts in parts of the Middle East. Critical Threats also publishes Africa File, a periodical report on security-related developments involving state and non-state actors in selected African countries.
