= Mohammed Omar Bio =

Nigerian politician (born 1964)

Member of the House of Representatives of Nigeria
- Incumbent
- Assumed office 11 June 2019
- Preceded by: Zakari Mohammed
- Constituency: Baruten/Kaiama Federal Constituency

Chairman of the House Committee on Legislative Budget and Research

Personal details
- Born: 1964 (age 61–62) Kwara State, Nigeria
- Party: All Progressives Congress
- Occupation: Politician

Mohammed Omar Bio Pronounciation is a Nigerian politician who serves as the member representing the Baruten/Kaiama Federal Constituency in the House of Representatives. Born on 2 June 1964, he hails from Kwara State. He was first elected to the House of Representatives in the 2019 elections and was re-elected in 2023 under the All Progressives Congress (APC).
