= Dogo Giɗe =

Nigerian bandit leader

- Born: Abubakar Abdullahi; Maru, Zamfara State, Nigeria
- Military career
- Allegiance: Banditry
- Rank: Terrorist, Bandit leader
- Conflicts: Nigerian bandit conflict Boko Haram insurgency

Dogo Giɗe is a notorious Nigerian bandit who has committed several crimes against humanity, including kidnapping, raping, cattle rustling, and armed robbery. His criminal activities have particularly affected Zamfara, Katsina, Niger, and Kaduna States, resulting in countless loss of lives and the destruction of many villages in various parts of Northwestern and in some parts of the North Central region, such as Niger and Nasarawa State.

== Early life ==
Dogo Giɗe was born and raised in the Maru Local government area of Zamfara State, Nigeria. He is married with children.

== Death rumours ==
In 2021, there were rumours that Dogo Giɗe had died. Dogo Giɗe was reportedly killed by some of his own men. He was allegedly killed at a hideout while receiving treatment for gunshot injuries sustained during an earlier battle in the Kuyan Bana forest, Zamfara State.

== Attacks against schools ==
Dogo Giɗe organized and led the abduction of 126 Students from Bethel Baptist Secondary School in Maraban Damishi, Chikun Local Government Area of Kaduna State on 5 July 2021. Additionally, he was involved in the kidnapping of over 90 students and numerous staff members from the Federal Government College in Birnin Yauri, Kebbi State. The victims were finally released following the payment of a substantial ransom, amounting to several million naira, by the parents of the abductees. Dogo Giɗe has been falsely implicated in the abduction of Kagara students in the Rafi Local Government of Niger State.

=== Married to Yauri's Students ===
After one year of the captivity of the Yauri school girls, there is news that Dogo Giɗe married Farida, one of the students, and he has married 11 of the girls off to his boys.

== Shooting down of helicopter ==
In August 2023, the members of Dogo Giɗe's faction took credit for the downing of a Nigerian helicopter in Chukuba Ward in the Shiroro local government area of Niger State. The attack resulted in the loss of more than 30 soldiers who were on board the aircraft.

== Dogo Giɗe protects farmers ==
On 27 June 2024, BBC Hausa reported that Dogo Giɗe had returned to his hometown in Zamfara state due to the bombardment of his house by the Nigerian Army, and now Dogo Giɗe is protecting farmers in some areas like Maru Local Government and other villages near Maru Local Government in Zamfara and Katsina states. In a telephone interview with a resident of Maru, he stated, "Dogo Giɗe is protecting us now, so we can go everywhere and at any time, and we are farming our lands" BBC Hausa also asked whether Dogo Giɗe had repented, and he replied, "We cannot say so, but he said he sympathizes with the people suffering from lack of food. We even asked him if we could contribute money for him, and he said no, that everyone should just continue farming their land. His boys are walking around the villages, checking to ensure that no one is kidnapped or shot, even fighting other gangs of bandits in order to protect us".

== See also ==
- Bello Turji
- Nigerian bandit conflict
