= Dauda Lawal =

Nigerian politician and banker (born 1965)

His Excellency Dauda Lawal
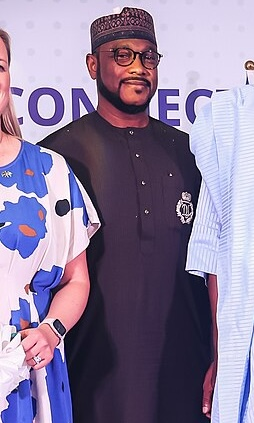
- Lawal in October 2023

Governor of Zamfara State
- Incumbent
- Assumed office 29 May 2023
- Deputy: Mani Mallam Mummuni
- Preceded by: Bello Matawalle

Personal details
- Born: 2 September 1965 (age 60) Gusau, Northern Region (now in Zamfara State), Nigeria
- Citizenship: Nigeria
- Party: All Progressives Congress
- Spouse: Huriyya Dauda Lawal
- Education: BSC, Msc. Political Science (ABU); PhD. Business Administration (UDUS)
- Alma mater: Ahmadu Bello University; Usmanu Danfodiyo University
- Occupation: Politician; banker

Dauda Lawal (born 2 September 1965) is a Nigerian banker and politician who is the governor of Zamfara state. He was elected under the platform of the Peoples Democratic Party (PDP) in the 2023 Nigerian gubernatorial elections defeating the incumbent Governor Bello Matawalle of the APC.

He is also a banker, and served as the executive director, Public Sector North, of First Bank of Nigeria Plc.

== Education ==
Lawal graduated from Ahmadu Bello University in 1987 with B.Sc. in political science, he obtained an M.Sc. in political science/international relations from the same university in 1992, and holds a PhD in business administration from Usmanu Danfodiyo University, Sokoto.

== Professional career ==
He started his working career in 1989 as a political education officer with the Agency for Mass Mobilization for Social and Economic Reliance Nigeria. In 1989, he joined Westex Nigeria Limited as an assistant general manager. In 1994, he was appointed as an assistant consular officer (immigration), and later chief protocol officer, Embassy of Nigeria, Washington, D.C., US. Lawal joined First Bank of Nigeria Plc in May 2003; as relationship manager, commercial banking, and was at various times senior manager, Abuja Area office, business development manager, Abuja, principal manager, group head PSG II, assistant general manager (business development manager), Maitama, deputy general manager (business development manager), Maitama/group head public sector, Abuja. Between October 2010 and September 2011, Lawal was elevated to the position of executive vice president, public sector North, of First Bank of Nigeria Plc. In September 2012 he became executive director, Public Sector North, of First Bank of Nigeria Plc.

== Political career ==
Lawal ran for office of the governor of Zamfara State in the APC primary election held in 2018 but lost to Mukhtar Shehu Idris.

He ran again in the PDP primary in 2022 and was nominated the party's flag bearer. In March 2023, he defeated incumbent Bello Matawalle to be elected governor of Zamfara State.

In one of the biggest upsets of the 2023 general elections, Lawal unseated incumbent governor Bello Matawalle in the March 18 governorship election. The Independent National Electoral Commission (INEC) declared Lawal the governor-elect with a total of 377,726 votes to defeat Matawalle of the All Progressives Congress (APC) who polled 311,976. Surprisingly, the PDP had never won a governorship election in Zamfara since 1999. The main opposition party lost to the various iterations of the ruling party in previous elections: from the All People's Party (APP) to the All Nigerian Peoples Party (ANPP) to the APC. Matawalle himself came to power as a PDP candidate in 2019, but it was the Supreme Court that gave him the top job having penalized the APC for not nominating its victorious candidate through valid primaries. In 2021, Matawalle decamped to the ruling APC.

In his first year in office, Lawal completed projects in Bakura and Aradun, and in Gummi, Bukkuyum, and Maru Local Government Areas.

== Corruption allegations ==
An anti-corruption group, Nigeria public Transparency Initiative Group (NPTIG) has called on the federal government and other anti-graft agencies to investigate the source of $40 million allegedly traced to Dauda Lawal as a former Executive Director of the first Bank. The group National coordinator, Dr Hamisu Bayero, disclosed this in s statement issued to journalist in Sokoto. Where he urged the relevant authorities to compile Dauda Lawal account for how he got the $40 million, since the bank's rules prevented him from carrying out any business while in office as executive director.The group urged the relevant authorities including the Economic And Financial Crimes Commission (EFCC) to carry out a holistic investigation in unveiling such a suspicious amount of money. The group also urged the anti-graft agencies not to enter a plea-bargain deal on the matter, saying such negotiation with suspect is like condoning criminal activities especially on issues that Borden on Corruption, stealing and other crimes the EFCC had earlier confiscated Dauda Lawal on Allegations that it was proceeds of corruption.

== Awards ==
Lawal received the FirstBank CEO Merit Award for Outstanding Performance as the "Best Business Development Manager" in 2006 and "The Most Enterprising Staff" in 2009.

In 2024 he received he Distinguished Award for Project Innovation at the Nigeria Excellence in Public Service (NEAPS) awards.
