= Ado Aleru =

Nigerian bandit leader

Ado Aleiru
- Born: Adamu Aleru; Ƴankuzo village, Tsafe, Zamfara State, Nigeria
- Military career
- Allegiance: Banditry
- Rank: Bandit leader
- Conflicts: Nigerian bandit conflict

Ado Aleru, also known as Adamu Aliero, is a notorious bandit leader based in Northern Nigeria, especially in Zamfara and Katsina state. He has led many deadly attacks, kidnappings, and cattle rustling in northwestern Nigeria.

== Traditional title ==
In July 2022, Aleru was given a traditional title of Sarkin Fulani by the emir of Yandoto daji. The reason of them for given him the title was to reduce violence between farmers and herders. This triggered national attention. The public asked why a wanted criminal should be given this kind of title. Later on the Emir was suspended by the Zamfara State Government. Many local leaders defended his decision, saying that this decision will reduced clashes of farmers and herders.

== Peace talks ==
Aleru attended many peace meetings within Zamfara and Katsina. He called for dialogue and rejected being labelled as a terrorist. The meeting triggered public concern because he was still on the list of police as a wanted figure. Aleru said "If the public still seeing us as terrorists, hence do not expect us to stop behaving like terrorists".

== Wanted ==
Aleru remains on security watchlists and wanted declaration by Nigeria Police.

== See also ==
- Nigerian bandit conflict
