= Shinkafi =

Shinkafi Shinkafi
- LGA and town
- Nickname: fadama,
- Motto: the commercial town
- Interactive map of Shinkafi
- Location in Nigeria
- Coordinates: 13°02′N 6°31′E
- Country: Nigeria
- State: Zamfara State
- Established: 1996

Government
  - Type: Local government council
  - Local Government Chairman: Ibrahim Musa Shinkafi

Area
  - Total: 674 km^{2} (260 sq mi)

Population (2006 census)
  - Total: 135,649
  - Density: 201/km^{2} (521/sq mi)
- Time zone: UTC+1 (WAT)
- 3-digit postal code prefix: 883
- Area code: SKF
- ISO 3166 code: NG.ZA.SH

Shinkafi is a town and Local Government Area in Zamfara State of Nigeria. It has an area of about 674 km^{2} (260 mi^{2}) and a population of 135,649 (2006 Census). It shares boundaries with Isa Local Government Area (Sokoto State) and Niger Republic from the north, Zurmi Local Government Area to the South and South-East, Maradun Local Government Area and Raba Local Government Area (Sokoto State) by the west. Distance from the State Capital, Gusau is approximately 116 km.

The postal code of the area is 883.

== History ==
In the early days of 1802 before the Jihad of Usman Danfodio, an Islamic scholar named Mallan Muhammadu Zabo, one of the ancestors of the Borno Empire migrated along the east of the area. He led an entourage in search of green pasture for their flocks. Mallan Zabo was wealthy and took with him many flocks, birds, horses, his wives and children as well as some slaves. It is also evident that the entire entourage that came along with him were part of the Barebari people that settled firstly in a nearby Village called ‘Badarawa’. The entourage later stopped at a valley near a river they named “Tafkin Kaiwa” which they made as their first settlement.

The Katsinawa merchant also found the place a good area for the settlement, the present days Gidan Dankwara. Another group of people came from Kwazare Town of Niger Republic together with their leader called Adagwargo, who belong to Rahazawa ethnic background, the present Gidan Sarkin Ruwa in Barhazawa area. This entourage also came with their herds and branched to the same valley where they found shelter and water to feed their herds. As they interacts socially with the first settlers, the Barebari, results to a growing population and the area become convenient for many stop-over traders, who used spend nights for they commercial undertakings. Yet another group of hunters who came around the valley in search of wild animals stars to settle there.

The area developed and became very big, with Mamman as their leader, the ruler of Badarawa, Magaji Bello, decided to come and re-settle in Gonar Mai Saje, (‘Yan Kukoki) where there was abundance of water. The people settled and began to cultivate rice along the valley in large quantity, due to their ability in rice production; the community was named ‘Shinkafi’ from the hausa name of rice - shinkafa. Due to insecurity of the times, Magaji Bello erected a wall (called Ganuwa) around the settlement which was enforced by a circular ditch. The descendants of Magaji Bello are the present Gidan Doka.

The socioeconomic activities of the town defines its international market status attracting traders and merchants from all over the federation and others from the neighboring countries like Niger Republic, Cameroon, Togo, Mali, Benin Republics, Chad as well as Ghana. There also exists some Tobacco leaf buying centres, namely Nigerian Tobacco Company (NTC) and Philp Morris Tobacco Company others were cottage industries.

The disciplined, religious and economic natures of the settlement conglomerate and attracted other settlements from Kamarawa, Shanawa, Badarawa, Isa and Sabon-Birnin Gobir, and such engineered the then Sarkin Gobir of Isa to place keen interest on the settlement – Shinkafi. The town developed tremendously to become the headquarters of the then Isa Native Authority in the North-West State, Isa Local Government Area in the then Sokoto State and the present Shinkafi Local Government Area of Zamfara State, Nigeria.

The majority of the inhabitants are predominantly Hausas and Fulanis with quite a number of other tribes like Igbos, Yorubas, Tivs and Zabarmawas. The town now has about 15 Primary Schools, 4 Secondary Schools, a General Hospital and on-going Referral Hospital, 4 Dispensaries, a number of Private Clinics. It has also pipe borne water system, as well as connected to the national grid, with good road network, Banking Services, Exotic Restaurants etc.

The town leadership used to be District Head from 1835 – 2000, when the First Executive Governor of Zamfara, Sen. Ahmed Sani (Yariman Bakura) upgraded it to an Emirate – Sarkin Gabas of Shinkafi (Second Class Emir). The rulers from then to-date are as follows:-

1. Magaji Mamman 1835 – 1845;

2. Magaji Bello 1845 – 1859;

3. Magaji Ibrahim I 1859 – 1874;

4. Magaji Bube 1874 – 1889;

5. Magaji Umaru 1889 – 1903;

6. Magaji Abdu 1903 – 1922;

7. Magaji Ahmadu 1922 – 1926;

8. Magaji Mainasara (Dango) 1926 – 1939;

9. Magaji Ahmadu Lamido 1939 – 1950;

10. Magaji Ibrahim II 1950 – 1990;

11. Magaji Mohammadu Moyi 1990 – 1994;

12. Magaji Mohammadu Makwashe 1995 – 2000;

13. Emir Mohammadu Makwashe 2000 – to date.

== Climate ==
The weather patterns of the year include a wet season that is hot, oppressive, and mostly cloudy, and a dry season that is hot, windy, and partly cloudy.

=== Average Temperature in Shinkafi ===
The warm period spans 2.2 months, from 18 March to 26 May, featuring daily high temperatures consistently exceeding 38 °C (100 °F). April stands out as the hottest month in Shinkafi, with an average high of 39 °C (103 °F) and a low of 26 °C (79 °F).

Conversely, the cooler season covers 1.6 months, running from 11 December to 30 January, characterized by daily high temperatures consistently below 32 °C (89 °F). January is the chilliest month of the year in Shinkafi, with an average low of 16 °C (61 °F) and a high of 31 °C (87 °F).

=== Cloud ===
In Shinkafi, there is a noticeable seasonal variation in the average cloud cover percentage throughout the year.

The period with the least cloud cover in Shinkafi starts approximately on 7 November and extends for 4.1 months, concluding around 10 March.

January stands out as the clearest month in Shinkafi, with an average of 67% of the sky being clear, mostly clear, or partly cloudy.

Conversely, the cloudier portion of the year begins around 10 March and continues for 7.9 months, ending approximately on 7 November.

May ranks as the cloudiest month in Shinkafi, with an average of 66% of the sky being overcast or mostly cloudy.

== Notable people ==
- Sani Abdullahi Shinkafi, Nigerian politician
- Bello Turji, bandit leader
- Mamuda Aliyu Shinkafi, Nigerian Politician
- Umar shinkafi, Nigerian politician
