= Darul Islam (Nigeria) =

Darul Islam ("land of Islam") is an Islamic organization in Nigeria. It which maintains a compound outside the town of Mokwa, Niger State, where 3,000-4,000 adherents live. The group is headed by Amrul Bashir Abdullahi. The term Darul Islam refers both to the group and the surrounding community.

== Raid ==
The government of Niger state and the federal authorities Nigeria collaborated to evacuate more than 3,000 Islamic members living secretly in Mokwa town during the episode of sectarian violence in 2009 in August 2009 who had been there for many years. Account and discussion lead to know that the Islamic group (Darul Islam) exist there for over seventeen years with no issue of violence tendencies reports against them. The federal and state level security stormed their hide out, although as an un-harmful group, there were located to a safe place in a transit camp at Federal Government Technical College, Mokwa, although 600 members were questioned by the police and were even orders to relocate to their various origins.

== Creed ==
Darul Islam is otherwise known as Darul Salam, which means "land of peace". The organization upholds doctrines that are not in line with the general beliefs of the majority of Muslims in Nigeria. First, the members of the organization believe that human society, and more specifically Nigerian society, has been corrupted by indecencies and licentiousness. This corruption militates against the practice of Islam; hence, it is necessary to migrate to the "land of Islam" or "land of peace" where Islam will be devotedly practiced. Second, Darul Islam's doctrine is that all Muslims are infidels until they profess the word of testimony, i.e. there is no God but Allah and Muhammad is His messenger. This means that, for a Muslim, imitating the parents or being born as a Muslim does not suffice. Professing the testimony is considered as a prerequisite to migrate to "Darul Islam" along with a pledge (Bai'ah) to the leader.

Those who make the pledge and subsequently violate or revolt against it and denounce the organization, is considered to have become a repudiator of his faith.
