= Abuja–Kaduna train attack =

Terrorist attack Kaduna State, Nigeria, in 2022

- Part of the Nigerian bandit conflict and the Boko Haram insurgency
- Location: Katari, Kaduna State, Nigeria
- Date: 28 March 2022; 19:45 WAT (UTC+1)
- Target: Public aboard Nigerian Railway Corporation trains
- Attack type: Bombing, mass shooting, kidnapping
- Weapons: Improvised explosive devices, firearms
- Deaths: 10
- Perpetrator: Nigerian bandits

On 28 March 2022, an Abuja–Kaduna train was attacked in Katari, Kaduna State, Nigeria. In response, the Nigeria Railway Corporation (NRC) briefly halted operations along the route.

== Incident ==
At around 7:45 pm, hundreds of passengers travelling northwards on their way to Nigeria's northwest were kidnapped in Katari, Kaduna State, while others were killed and injured by bandits who bombed an Abuja-Kaduna train.

Approximately 970 passengers were on board, and several may have been abducted into the bush by the marauding bandits who arrived on motorbikes holding firearms and other deadly weapons, according to a passenger who escaped the onslaught.

The train left Abuja's Idu station at 6 pm and was scheduled to arrive in Kaduna's Rigasa train station by 8 pm. According to eyewitness accounts, the train was bombed twice before the armed bandits opened fire at the passengers.

Sixty-two passengers were abducted in the attack.

The Acting Managing Director of the Bank of Agriculture, Alwan Ali-Hassan was freed on 6 April. Eleven passengers were freed on 11 June Seven passengers were released on 9 July. Four passengers were freed on 25 July. Five passengers were released on 2 August. Seven passengers were freed on 10 August. Four passengers were released on 19 August. The final twenty-three passengers were released on Thursday the 6th.

== Casualties ==
Ten people were killed, including Amin Mahmoud, a youth leader of the ruling All Progressives Congress, APC, Chinelo Megafu Chinelo, a medical doctor, Tibile Mosugu, a rising lawyer and son of Senior Advocate of Nigeria, and Barrister Musa Lawal-Ozigi, secretary-general, Trade Union Congress, TUC.

Megafu Chinelo, a doctor, was declared dead hours after she said on Twitter that she had been shot on the Kaduna-bound train. In a statement released on 28 March 2022, the Nigerian Medical Association (NMA) verified this. Chinelo tweeted shortly after the train from Abuja to Kaduna was attacked by terrorists: "I'm in the train, I have been shot. Please pray for me".

== Other recent attacks ==
The incident occurred in the broader context of the Nigerian bandit conflict, and took place two days after a bandit raid at Kaduna Airport, in which two personnel from the Nigerian Airspace Management Agency (NAMA) were slain and several other workers were kidnapped. The Nigerian railway corporation suspended operations on the route on 29 March.

== Aftermath ==
In the aftermath of the attack, the Nigerian Air Force conducted raids in the forest on the boundary of Niger State and Kaduna State, killing "no fewer than 34 terrorists," according to the Guardian.

Government authorities later said that intelligence and investigations by security forces pointed to an "unholy handshake" of bandits cooperating with insurgent jihadist groups such as Boko Haram that were suspected to have carried out the attack, analyzing videos of hostages and statements by the attackers as evidence. University of Lagos academic John Barnett said that while he believed bandits had carried out the attack, "the use of explosives.... may point to some jihadist collaboration, perhaps with Ansaru elements."

== See also ==
- List of kidnappings (2020–present)
