= Zurmi massacre =

2021 massacre in Nigeria

- Location: Zurmi, Zamfara State, Nigeria
- Date: 11-12 June 2021
- Target: civilians
- Attack type: mass shooting, massacre
- Deaths: 53-90
- Injuries: unknown

On 11–12 June 2021, a massacre occurred in Zurmi, Zamfara State, Nigeria. The attack was part of a broader conflict in the region between government and armed bandits.

On 11 and 12 June 2021, a group of gunmen on motorcycles attacked the villages of Kadawa, Kwata, Maduba, Ganda Samu, Saulawa and Askawa in the Zurmi local government area of Zamfara State in northwestern Nigeria, killing 53. Most of the victims were farmers who were shot while they worked in the fields.

== Aftermath ==
Once the massacre had ended, all 53 bodies had been discovered and given proper burials. Police were deployed in the region to prevent further mass killings from occurring.
