= Nigerian bandit conflict =

Conflict between gangs and the Nigerian government

- Part of Herder–farmer conflicts in Nigeria and spillover of the Boko Haram insurgency
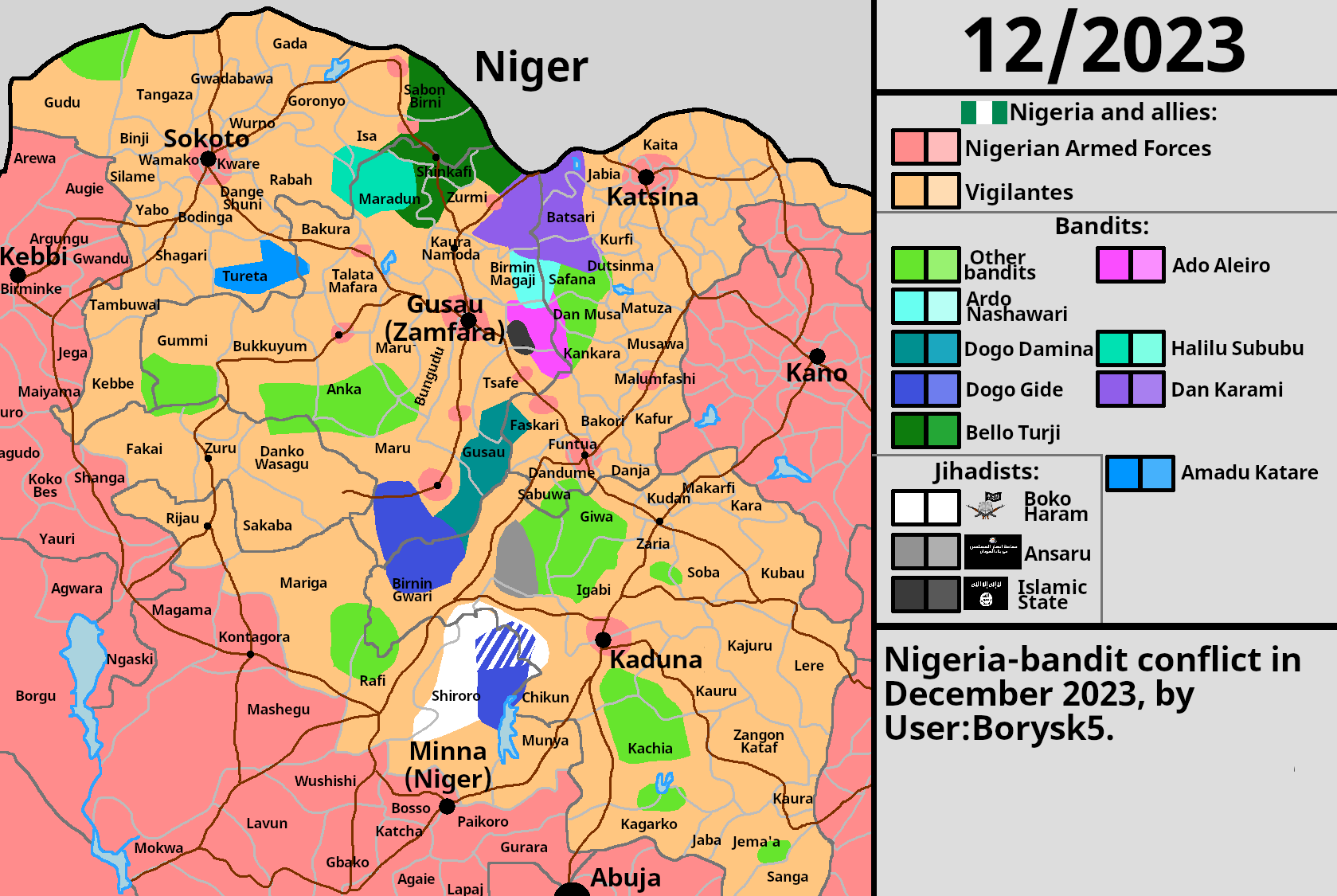
- Map of the conflict as of 2023
Date	2011–present
Location	Throughout northwest Nigeria, with occasional attacks in southern Niger and northern Benin
Status	Ongoing

Belligerents
Nigeria; Nigeria Police Force; Nigerian Armed Forces; Nigerian Army; Nigerian Air Force; Niger; Niger Armed Forces; United States (2025-2026); Vigilante groups; Vigilante Group of Nigeria; Lakurawa (2016/2018-2023)	Various bandit groups; Hausa militias; Yan Sakai; Moriki vigilantes group; Fulani militias; Ali Kachalla's gang; Dogo Giɗe's gang; Kachalla Halilu Sububu Seno's gang; Adamu Aliero Yankuzo's gang; Bello Turji Kachalla's gang; Dan Karami's gang; Kachalla Turji's gang; Islamist insurgents: Islamic State; West Africa Province; Sahel Province; Lakurawa (from c. 2023); Al-Qaeda; Jama'at Nasr al-Islam wal Muslimin; Nigerian Brigade; Ansaru; (Islamic State) Boko Haram; Sadiku’s faction

Commanders and leaders
(Nigeria) Bola Tinubu (2023–); (Nigeria) Olubunmi Tunji-Ojo (2023–); (Nigeria) Kayode Egbetokun (2023–); (Niger) Abdourahamane Tiani (2025–); (United States) Donald Trump (2025–2026); (United States) Pete Hegseth (2025–2026); Mohammed Badaru Abubakar (2023–); Christopher Musa (2023–); Taoreed Lagbaja # (2023–24); Hassan Abubakar (2023–); Umar Namadi (2023–); Uba Sani (2023–); Abba Yusuf (2023–); Dikko Radda (2023–); Nasir Idris (2023–); Ahmad Aliyu (2023–); Dauda Lawal (2023–); Former commanders: (Nigeria) Muhammadu Buhari; (Nigeria) Goodluck Jonathan; (Nigeria) Abba Moro; (Nigeria) Abdulrahman Dambazau; (Nigeria) Rauf Aregbesola; (Nigeria) Hafiz Ringim; (Nigeria) Mohammed Dikko Abubakar; (Nigeria) Suleiman Abba; (Nigeria) Solomon Arase; (Nigeria) Ibrahim Kpotun Idris; (Nigeria) Mohammed Adamu; (Nigeria) Usman Alkali Baba; Bashir Salihi Magashi; Mansur Dan Ali; Aliyu Mohammed Gusau; Labaran Maku; Olusola Obada; Haliru Mohammed Bello; Lucky Irabor; Abayomi Olonisakin; Alex Badeh; Ola Ibrahim; Oluseyi Petinrin; Faruk Yahaya; Ibrahim Attahiru †; Tukur Yusuf Buratai; Kenneth Minimah; Azubuike Ihejirika; Isiaka Oladayo Amao; Sadique Abubakar; Adesola Nunayon Amosu; Alex Badeh; Mohammed Dikko Umar; Mohammed Badaru Abubakar; Sule Lamido; Nasir El-Rufai; Mukhtar Yero; Patrick Yakowa; Abdullahi Umar Ganduje; Rabiu Kwankwaso; Aminu Bello Masari; Ibrahim Shema; Usman Saidu Nasamu Dakingari; Aminu Musa Habib Jega; Abubakar Atiku Bagudu; Aminu Tambuwal; Aliyu Magatakarda Wamakko; Bello Matawalle; Abdul'aziz Abubakar Yari	(Islamic State) Sadiku; Kachalla Halilu †; Dogo Giɗe; Kachalla Turji; Sani Mochoko; Bello Turji; Sani Buta; Danmakaranta; Ali Kachalla †; Mani Na Saleh; Adamu Aliero Yankuzo; Abubakar Ali (POW); Jack Bros Yellow (POW); Goma Sama'ila (POW); Dan Karami (WIA); Auwalun Daudawa †; Alhaji Karki †; Buharin Daji †; Damina †; Isiya Danwasa †; Abu Jafa'ar (Islamic State) Ameer Habib Tajje; Other local commanders

Units involved
8 divisions; 1 Mechanized Division; 312 Field Artillery Regiment; 31 Artillery Brigade; 223 Armored Battalion; 2 Battalion; 207 Quick Response Group	Unknown

Strength
Unknown	30,000+ Zamfara State

Casualties and losses
Unknown; 1 Alpha Jet	Unknown
- At least 12,000 killed 450,000 people displaced

The Nigerian bandit conflict is an ongoing conflict between the country's federal government and various gangs and ethnic militias. Starting in 2011, the insecurity remaining from the conflict between the Fulani and Hausa ethnic groups quickly allowed other criminal and jihadist elements to form in the region.

== Background ==
The origins of the bandit conflict can be traced back to herder–farmer conflicts that plague Nigeria. Environmental decline and the scarcity of water and arable land led to communities competing viciously for those limited resources. Unemployment, large-scale poverty, and weak local government have allowed for a steady stream of desperate people turning to criminal activity to earn a living. Large forested areas allow for concealment and the formation of camps deep in the forest. Unequipped police and military personnel are unable to reach these areas.

Continued insecurity, desertification and jihadist influence have allowed for a rise in attacks to take place. Large-scale weapons smuggling has allowed criminal gangs access to heavy weapons, increasing the deadliness of attacks which has affected the lives and loss of property worth billions of dollars, and the presence of these groups has driven away foreign investment. Underequipped local and federal forces, coupled with the harsh terrain, make offensive actions into the forest dangerous and susceptible to ambushes and attacks. Continued government inability to effectively deal with the problem has allowed insecurity to spread and grow in ferocity.

=== Kidnapping ===
Bandits have been known to ride into villages on motorcycles to loot and kidnap the inhabitants, killing anyone who resists. Kidnapping is a very profitable venture in northern Nigeria and is increasingly spreading to some parts of southern Nigeria. Between 2011 and 2020, Nigerians paid at least 18 billion naira to free family members and friends.

=== Arms trade ===
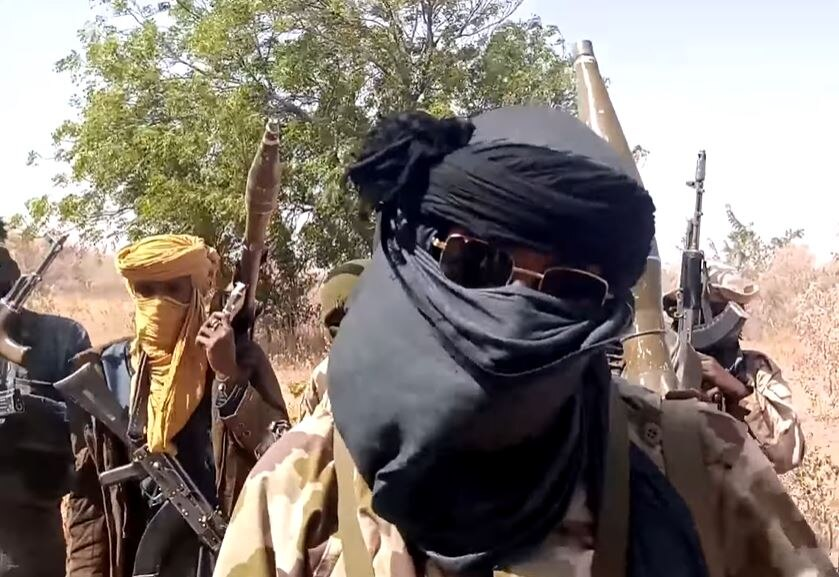
Nigerian bandits with heavy weapons and RPGs, February 2021

Illegal arms are prevalent in northwest Nigeria. Bandit gangs control gold mines and use the gold to purchase arms from internal and international arms dealers. There are an estimated 60,000 illegal weapons in circulation in northwest Nigeria. The border of northern Nigeria is undefended, with only 1,950 personnel to police the whole border, making it easy for smuggling across the border. Notable bandit gang ‘Boh’, lead by Imoh Abussy Etim, is at large in the arms trade.

== Timeline ==
=== Pre-2020 ===
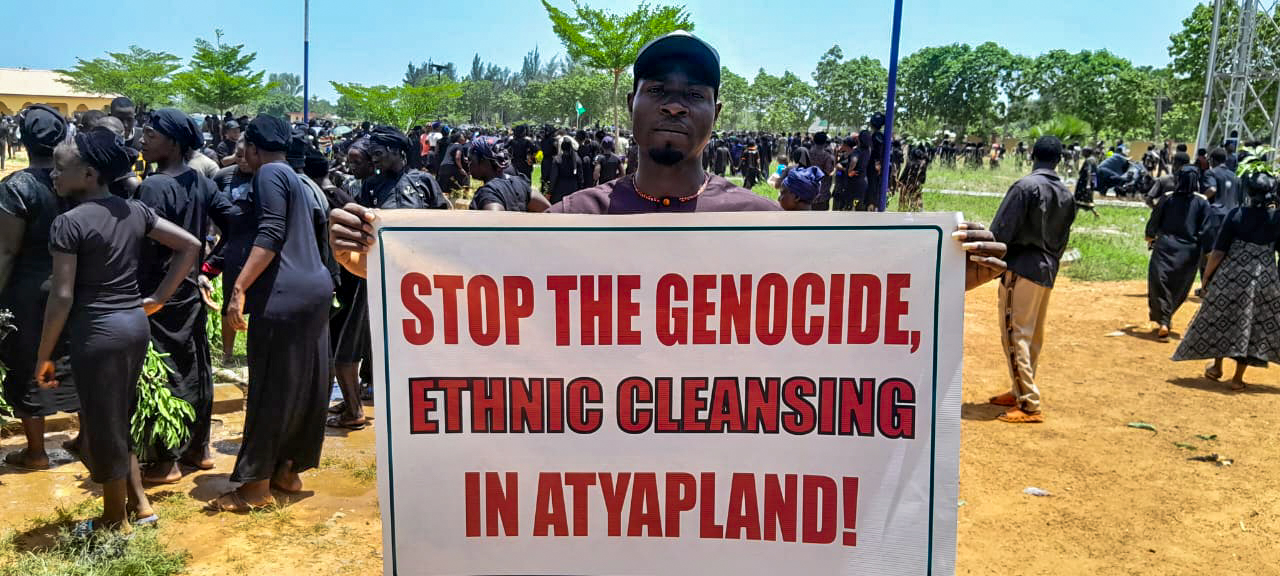
World Press Conference organized by the Atyap Community Development Association (ACDA) on May 1, 2023

Between 2011 and 2023, mass killings occurred in Southern Kaduna against indigenous peoples were perpetrated by Fulani bandits, killing 1,500. Between 2011 and 2016, the governor said 204 people lost their lives while the Catholic Church in Kaduna State said 808 people were killed by the armed bandits. In January 2020, the NGO Christian Solidarity International released a warning over a possible genocide against Nigerian Christians and referenced the attacks on Christian villages in Southern Kaduna as an example of rising violence.

=== 2020 ===
- 18 April – Bandits attacked the village of Katsina, demanding the food and other relief materials given as part of the government's efforts to help during the lockdown due to the coronavirus pandemic.
- 26 May – Bandit groups attacked multiple villages in Sokoto State, killing over 74.
- 11 December – Over 300 pupils were kidnapped from a boys' secondary boarding school on the outskirts of Kankara, Katsina State, northern Nigeria.
- c.December – Over 80 children from the Madrasa of Hizburrahim Islamiyya were kidnapped by Boko Haram or local bandits.

=== 2021 ===
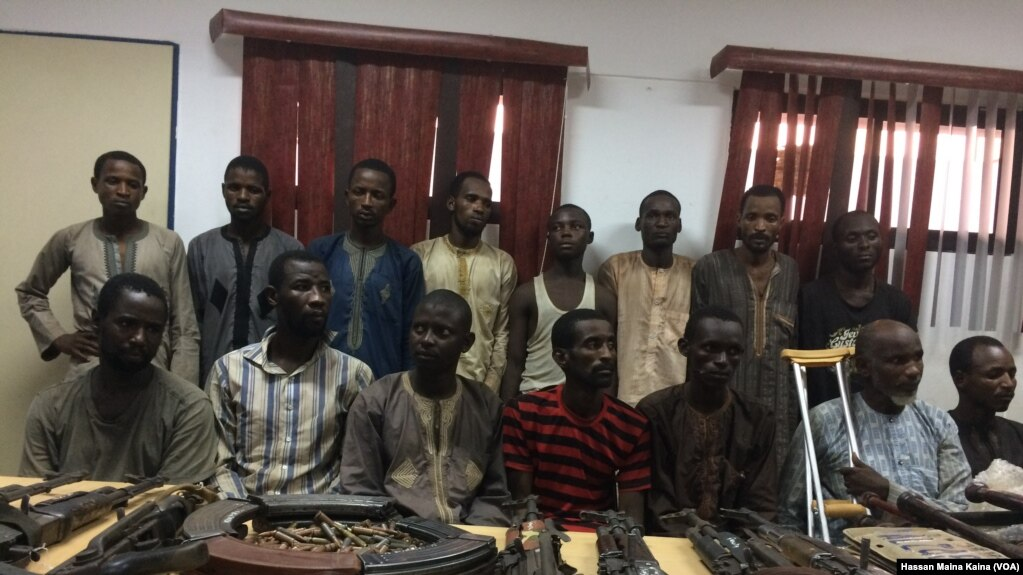
Bandits arrested in Zamfara state, September 2021

- 24–25 February – February 2021 Kaduna and Katsina attacks
- 26 February – Zamfara kidnapping
- 11 March – Afaka kidnapping
- 20 April – Greenfield University kidnapping
- 3 June – 2021 Kebbi massacre
- 11–12 June – Zurmi massacre
- 14 June – Kebbi kidnapping
- 29 June – Zamfara State legislator Muhammad Ahmad is killed.
- 5 July – Chikun kidnapping
- 25 October – Gunmen attacked a mosque in Mazakuka in the Mashegu area of Niger State during fajr prayers. They killed 17 worshippers and an imam and injured four other people. The assailants, who were believed to belong to the Fulani ethnic group, fled after the shooting.

=== 2022 ===
- 4–6 January – 2022 Zamfara massacres
- 14–15 January – Dankade massacre
- 8 March – March 2022 Kebbi massacres
- 26 March – A gang of 200 bandits targeted Kaduna International Airport. A security guard was killed but the military successfully managed to repel the bandits.
- 28 March – Abuja–Kaduna train attack – a train heading from Abuja to Kaduna was attacked in Katari, Kaduna state, killing 10 passengers.
- 10 April – 2022 Plateau State massacres.
- December 2022 – More than 40 people were killed in Kaduna.

=== 2023 ===
- 7 January – Armed bandits abducted 32 people at a railway station in Edo State.
- 4 February – At least 41 people were killed after bandits clashed with a vigilante group at a village in Katsina State.
- 15 April – Bandits attacked Runji in Kaduna State, killing 33 people. The bandits then set fire to the village, burning over 40 houses.
- 3 June – Bandits killed two people and abducted 30 in three communities in Kaduna State.
- 5 June – 36 people were killed after bandits raided six villages across northern Nigeria.
- 10 June – At least 120 bandits on motorcycles killed 55 people and kidnapped dozens in two villages in Niger State.
- 25 July – Bandits killed 34 people in Zamfara State. Twenty-seven villagers were killed in the Maru local government area, and seven soldiers were ambushed and killed while attempting to aid the community.
- 13 August – Bandits ambushed Nigerian security forces, killing 23 soldiers and three civilian vigilantes. A helicopter rescuing people from the scene also crashed due to gunfire from bandits.
- 15 August – 13 military personnel were killed after an encounter with bandits in Niger State. The soldiers also killed 50 bandits.
- 10 October – Suspected bandits killed the head of the Zazzaga village and kidnapped several others in adjoining communities in Niger State.
- 5 November – Bandits killed at least 20 people and abducted several others during a Maulud celebration in Katsina State.
- 24 November – Bandits raided four villages in Zamfara State, killing one person and kidnapping at least 150.
- 23–25 December – at least were 160 killed in the 2023 Plateau State massacres.

=== 2024 ===
- 7 March Kuriga kidnapping: 287 school children and a teacher were abducted from their school in Kuriga, Kaduna State, by armed terrorists on motorcycles.

=== 2025 ===
- 12 February – Residents hold protest and block a road following a bandit attack that took 31 people and an Imam hostage in Maru, Zamfara State.
- 21 March – Two Lakurawa militants were killed by Security forces in an operation in Rubin Bisa and Fana villages of Kebbi State.
- 7 April – The National Emergency Management Agency (NEMA) reports that at least 52 people have been killed and more than 2,000 others displaced from their homes in Plateau State amid reprisal attacks by rival herders for control of farmland.
- 14 June – Amnesty International Nigeria reported that at least 100 people had been killed in an attack on Yelewata, in the Guma area of Benue State. Police confirmed the attack but had not provided a death toll at the time of the report.
- 1 July – militants believed to be members of the Lakurawa group launched a raid on Kwallajiya, a village in the Tangaza Local Government Area of Sokoto State, Nigeria. Leaving 15 to 17 people dead.
- 7 July – Over 70 vigilante group members are killed and others are missing in a mass shooting ambush by bandits in Kukawa and Bunyun communities of Plateau State.
- October 31 – JNIM's Nigerian Brigade claimed responsibility for an attack that killed one Nigerian soldier while also seizing weapons and cash in central Nigeria, its first known attack in the country.
- December 25 – U.S. president Donald Trump authorized airstrikes against Islamic State militants in northwest Nigeria.

=== 2026 ===
  - 3 January – At least 50 people are killed in an attack by gunmen on the village of Kasuwan-Daji in Borgu, Niger State.
- 18 January – Around 177 people are abducted by gunmen following attacks on three churches in Kurmin Wali in Kajuru, Kaduna State.
- 19 January – Soldiers responding to an attack on a village in Zamfara State are ambushed by militants, resulting in the deaths of five soldiers and one police officer.
- 21 January – Soldiers rescue 62 hostages and kill two militants during separate military operations in Zamfara and Kebbi States.
- 26 January – The army rescues 11 kidnapping victims who had been held for 92 days after being abducted from Gada Mallam Maman, Kaduna State in October 2025.
- 3 February – At least 13 people are killed in an attack by gunmen on the village of Doma in Faskari, Katsina State. On the same day, Sadiku's faction was likely behind a February 2026 massacre in the villages of Woro and Nuku, Kwara State, that killed at least 200 people; the residents had rejected their demands to adopt Sharia law and rebel against Nigeria.
- 7 February – Gunmen attack a Catholic priest's residence in Kauru, Kaduna State, killing three people and abducting a priest among several others.
- 14 February – At least 46 people are killed in attacks by gunmen on the villages of Tunga-Makeri, Konkoso and Pissa in Borgu, Niger State.
- 19 February - At least 50 people are killed in an attack by gunmen on the village of Tungan Dutse in Bukkuyum, Zamfara State.
- 28 February – At least 15 people are killed in an attack by gunmen on three villages in Borgu, Niger State.
- 6 March - At least 45 militants are killed in clashes between the Nigerian Armed Forces and armed bandits in Dan Musa, Katsina State.
- 13 March – Around 20 members of the security forces are killed in an ambush in Kanam, Plateau State.
- 17 March – At least 18 people are killed in attacks on two villages in Jibia, Katsina State.
- 5 April – The Nigerian Army rescues 31 civilians taken hostage during an attack on Easter church services in Kaduna State; at least five people are confirmed dead.
- 27 April – Twenty-three pupils are abducted by gunmen from an illegal orphanage in Lokoja, Kogi State.
- 10 May:
  - At least 72 civilians are killed in an airstrike during operations against bandits in Tumfa, Zamfara State. On the same day, at least 13 civilians are killed in an airstrike during operations against bandits in Niger State.
  - As a response, at least 30 travelers are killed in an attack by armed gangs in Zamfara State.
- 15 May - Oyo school kidnappings: Three people are arrested following a kidnapping incident on two primary schools in Oriire, Oyo State.
- 16 May:
  - US President Donald Trump and Nigerian President Bola Tinubu announce that American and Nigerian forces killed Abu-Bilal al-Minuki, the ISIS second in command globally and his several lieutenants in a strike on his compound in the Lake Chad Basin.
  - At least 17 police trainees are killed after Islamist militants attack the Nigerian Army Special Forces School in Buni Yadi, Yobe State.
  - Ten people are killed, including children and a pregnant woman, in an attack by bandits on a rural community in Katsina State, Nigeria.
- 22 May – An attempted bandit attack on a rural community in Tsafe, Zamfara is foiled and one bandit is killed after police operatives worked with residents. The ensuing gunfight also injured a few bandits who hid in nearby bushes.
- 24 May – Bandits attacked worshippers during a night vigil in Ekiti, Kwara, killing three and abducting 15 others.
- 25 May – Three kidnappers are killed and a civilian is rescued after police operatives responded to a distress call.
- 26 May:
  - A notable kidnap kingpin is neutralized in Kaduna State when the suspect attempted to escape after being detained and interrogated earlier in the morning.
  - Two bandits are neutralized and explosive devices are captured by state forces after an early morning firefight in Bungudu, Zamfara.
- 28 May:
  - Thirty-one abducted civilians are rescued by police forces in a patrol operation in Anka, Zamfara.
  - A local councillor and a director are murdered by reported bandits in Talata-Mafara, Zamfara.
- 29 May:
  - At least 16 civilians are feared dead and several missing after suspected bandits raided a village in Dutsin-Ma, Katsina State.
  - One gang member is killed and three other armed attackers are arrested during a police operation in Zamfara.
- 30 May:
  - A terrorist is neutralized and a planned abduction attack is foiled in an army operation in Lokoja, Kogi.
  - Suspected armed bandits ambush a vehicle on a highway in Matazu, Katsina, injuring the driver and abducting two other passengers.
- 31 May:
  - Unidentified gunmen attacked and shot two police officers on patrol in Anambra.
  - At least eight people are killed and 15 others are injured after an armed shooting carried out by Fulani bandits took place in Barkin Ladi, Plateau State.
  - Several worshippers are injured and a boy is killed by bandits during a mosque shooting in Kaduna.
- 1 June:
  - An early-morning bandit attack in Kabba/Bunu, Kogi State, Nigeria, leaves two people dead and five injured, with 30 civilians kidnapped, of whom 23 are later rescued by Nigerian Army troops.
  - Fulani bandits raid a village in Mangu Halle, Plateau State, killing a married couple as well as another civilian.
  - Three bandits are neutralized and a planned attack is foiled in an army operation in Kaura Namoda, Zamfara.
  - One person is killed as well as two Fulani women are kidnapped in an armed bandit attack targeting the outskirts of the town of Lafiagi, Edu, Kwara.
- 2 June – Four bandits are neutralized and two kidnapping victims are rescued in an counterinsurgency operation across Benue.
- 3 June:
  - Seven federal polytechnic school students are kidnapped after armed gunmen raided a residence in Kaura Namoda, Zamfara.
  - Four men who were accused of the 5 June 2022 Catholic church attack in Owo, Ondo, which killed over 40 worshippers, are sentenced to death by hanging.
  - Five kidnapped civilians of a church attack in Ifelodun, Kwara on March 22 are reported to have been killed in captivity, while the abductors are demanding a ₦1 billion ransom for the release of one remaining victim.
- 4 June – Seven people are killed, six others are injured, and 50 houses are burned following a clash between herdsmen and farmers of two communities in Darazo, Bauchi.
- 5 June:
  - A pastor's nine-year-old son is kidnapped and two houses are razed after bandits raided a rural community in Ose, Ondo.
  - Several farmers are killed in a raid by bandits in Zamfara, with numerous others injured.
- 6 June:
  - A joint operation by state forces arrested five bandits while also rescuing three kidnapped victims in Kaduna.
  - Three road safety officers are fatally shot on a road in Bagudo.
- 8 June – It is reported that three bandits are neutralized in a joint anti-banditry operation in Jangebe forest, Anka LGA, Zamfara.
- 12 June – At least 17 people are killed in an attack by gunmen on the town of Goron Namaye in Maradun, Zamfara State.
- 21 June – At least 20 people are killed in an attack by gunmen on the settlement of Kawel in Bokkos, Plateau State.
- 8 July – The Nigerian Army and vigilantes begin a two-day operation against armed bandit groups in Gummi, Zamfara State, with more than 300 bandits killed during the fighting.
- 22 July – At least 24 farmers were killed and several others wounded when armed bandits attacked a farming community in Talata Mafara, Zamfara State.
- 27 July – At least 30 people were killed and four others injured, after armed gunmen attacked Naridon village in Kauru, Kaduna State.
- 2 August – At least 12 people were killed after armed bandits attacked Lajinge village in Sokoto State.
- 10 August – At least 29 people were killed in clashes between police and rebels in Sakaba, Kebbi State.
- 22 August – Several people were killed and abducted by Lakurawa militants in Dikera and Binzi villages in Niger State. Some has been able to escape during the group's clashes with Mahmuda militants.

=== Counteroffensives ===
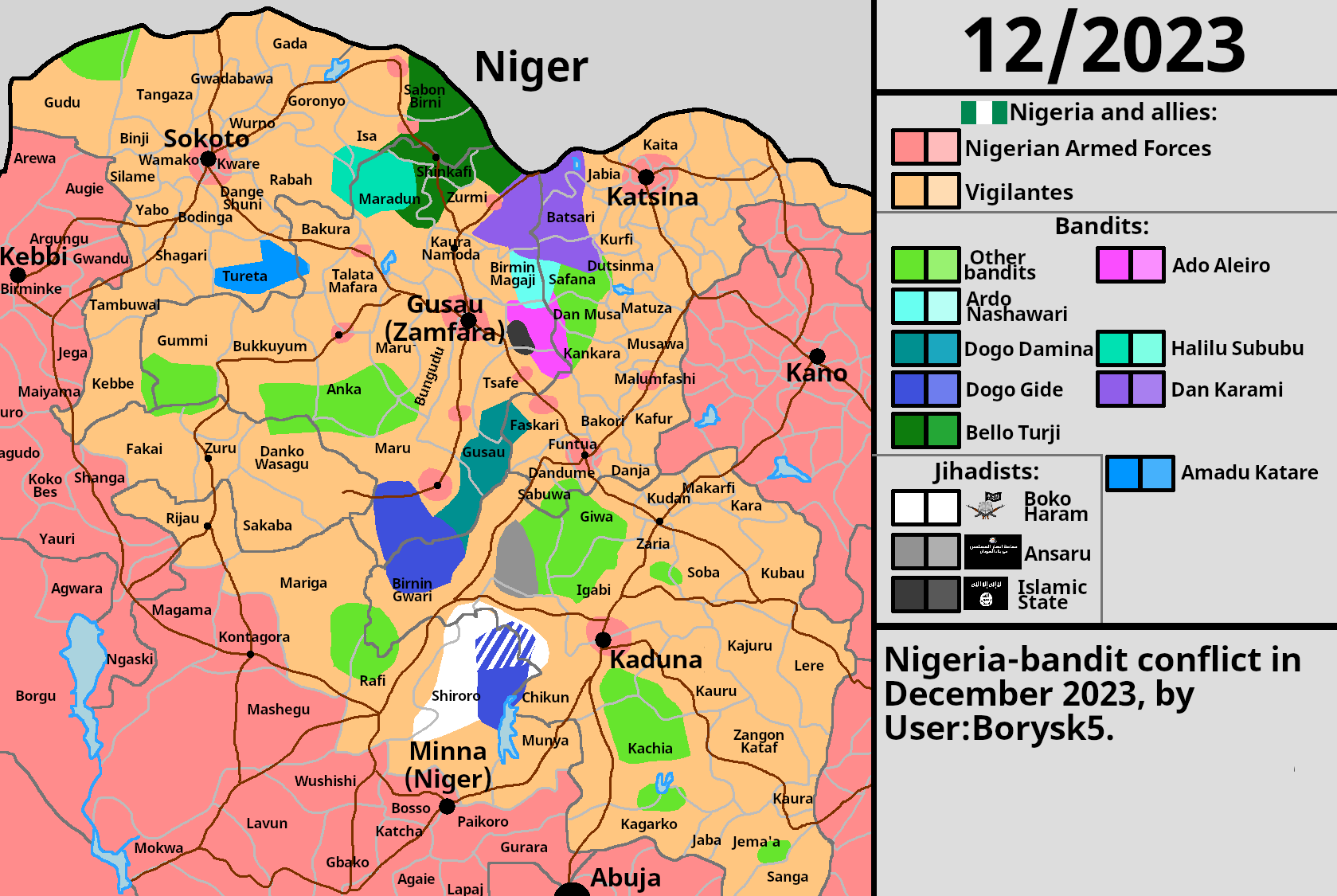
Map of Nigerian bandit conflict

==== Operation Harbin Kunama ====
On 8 July 2016, President Muhammadu Buhari announced that the Nigerian military would launch a military operation code-named Operation Harbin Kunama. The operation was carried out by the 223 armored battalion of the 1 Mechanised Division and targeted bandit groups in the Dansadau Forest. In the days before the announcement, convoys carried new military equipment into Zamfara State, including tanks and armoured fighting vehicles.

==== Operation Sharan Daji ====
In early 2016, Operation Sharan Daji was launched to combat bandits in the northwest. The operation was conducted by the 31 Artillery Brigade and 2 Battalion of the first 1 Mechanised Division. By March, 35 bandits were killed, 36 guns were seized, 6,009 cattle were recovered, 49 bandit camps were destroyed and 38 bandits were captured. In 2019, the Nigerian Army confirmed the killing of four bandits under Operation Sharan Daji.

==== Operation Accord ====
On 5 June 2020, Operation Accord was launched as a joint task force of vigilantes and troops of the 312 Artillery Regiment. An air and ground offensive killed more than 70 bandits. The operation led to the destruction of multiple bandit camps, including a camp belonging to Ansaru.

==== October 2023 airstrikes ====
On 13 October 2023, Nigerian fighter jets carried out airstrikes on a gathering of bandits in Zamfara State. At least 100 bandits were killed and over 200 injured.

==== December 2023 accidental airstrike ====
On 3 December 2023, a drone strike was carried out by the Nigerian Armed Forces on Tudun Biri, Kaduna State. Targeting what they thought was a group of bandits, the army mistakenly hit a village, killing at least 88 civilians.

=== Conflict between Ansaru and bandits ===
The first reported clash between Ansaru and bandit groups occurred on 28 September 2021, in Birnin Gwari, killing 4 bandits of Ali Kachalla’s gang as well as 1 Ansaru member. The clashes had started when Ansaru demanded that the bandits stop abductions and invasions of other communities. Further engagements occurred during the week, inflicting huge losses on Kachalla’s gang, with Ansaru claiming to have killed 30 bandits.

On 13 July 2022, a convoy of nearly 200 bandits on motorcycles battled with Ansaru in Damari, a small town in Kazage Ward, Birnin Gwari. The clashes lasted for approximately an hour, causing damage to several buildings and vehicles in the town, as well as the death of 2 civilians by fleeing bandits. Ansaru eventually repelled the attack, with locals hailing them for their defense of the community. Despite Ansaru's victory, the bandits returned to Damari on 25 July unopposed, killing 3 people in the town. The bandits returned on 26 July, looting local shops and kidnapping 13 people. Ansaru had seemingly lost control of the town, allowing bandits to move unchallenged and kidnap more than 50 people over the next few days, leading to a large exodus.

A clash between Ansaru and bandits occurred in Damari on 21 November 2022, with Ansaru killing 5 of the bandits before retreating from the town. On 14 December 2023, Birnin Gwari’s local bandits ambushed a group of Ansaru militants in the town, killing 5 of them. The bandits then overran Kuyello on 17 December as Ansaru retreated into nearby forests. Ansaru then battled the bandits in the forest, reportedly killing many.

Until 2024, Dogo Giɗe’s gang and the jihadi group Ansaru had ties and an alliance against the government. Ansaru started a battle against Giɗe over control of a gold mine in Kuyello on 1 April. Giɗe's group reportedly suffered numerous losses during the battle, including that of close associates, family members and wanted bandits Mudi and Murtala.

=== Conflict between Boko Haram and Dogo Giɗe ===
Before 2023, Boko Haram-Sadiku’s faction and Dogo Giɗe’s bandit group had cooperated in several attacks and hijacks, such as the Abuja–Kaduna train attack in 2022. In 2023 the faction broke ties with Gide, resulting in violent clashes. A former associate of Sadiku said that Sadiku had been "arrogant" and demanded respect from the bandits, leading to the fallout. In January 2025, Gide's men claimed the killing of 20 fighters from Sadiku's faction. Despite this, the Institute for Security Studies reported in July that Bakura was possibly mediating a deal between the two groups.

== Belligerents ==
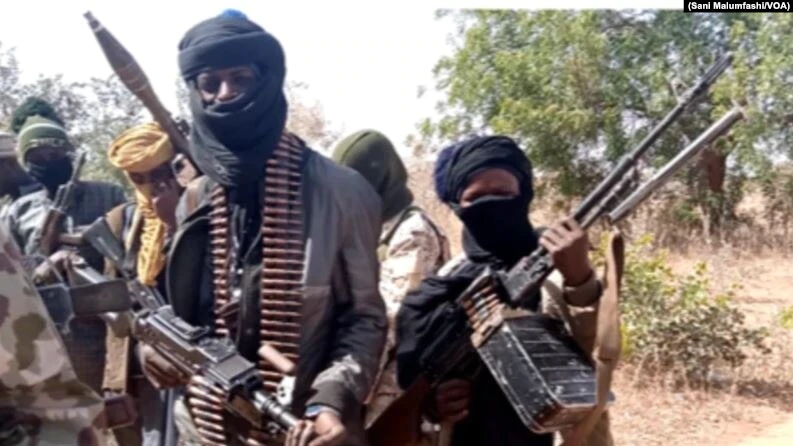
Nigerian bandits inside their base, February 2021

In Zamfara state alone, there are (as of 2021) over 30,000 bandits and 100 camps.

=== Ali Kachalla ===
Ali Kawaje, better known by his alias Ali Kachalla, was a bandit leader in his early 30s who was born in a small town called Madada near Dansadau. Kachalla controlled a bandit group of about 200 in the Kuyambana Forest. His main base of operations consisted of several huts along the Goron Dutse River, about 25 km south of Dansadau. Kachalla's gang directly controls the villages of Dandalla, Madada and Gobirawa Kwacha, from where he launched attacks on Dansadau and other neighboring communities.

Kachalla's gang has carried out numerous attacks, most notably the downing of a Nigerian Air Force Alpha Jet on 18 July 2021 and the destruction of a Mowag Piranha armored personnel carrier in Dansadau on 23 July 2021. Kachalla's gang has suffered defeats, most notably losing 30 men in a battle with an Ansaru cell.

Kachalla was killed on 11 December 2023. Before his death, Kachalla and his fighters attacked a detachment of security operatives in Magorno, Munya. The air component of Nigeria's Operation Whirl Punch was notified shortly after, and its aircraft scrambled to protect troops under attack. Aircraft spotted Kachalla and his men withdraw from the area on a convoy of 11 motorcycles. The aircraft trailed them to their hideout near Kopa Hills, and airstrikes were authorized, resulting in the deaths of Kachalla and several of his men.

=== Dogo Giɗe ===
Abubakar Abdullahi, known as Dogo Giɗe, is the leader of a bandit group near Dansadau. He is from the Maru local government and is in his 40s, married with children. He is known for killing bandit leader Buharin Daji and 24 of Daji's gang members by luring Daji to a peace meeting. He also killed a rival bandit leader named Damina who had attacked villages under Giɗe's control. Giɗe is believed to have formed criminal ties with Boko Haram in 2019. He is also believed to have the financial capacity and connections to procure weapons. He is believed to have masterminded many kidnapping raids, one of which involved the kidnapping of scores of students from the Federal Government College Yauri in Kebbi State in June 2021.

=== Kachalla Halilu Sububu Seno ===
Kachalla Halilu Sububu Seno was the leader of a Fulani bandit group. He commanded over 1,000 bandits in the Sububu Forest across Zamfara State and had connections to bandit groups across Mali, Senegal, Burkina Faso, Cameroon and the Central African Republic. In 2019, he signed a peace treaty with officals in Shinkafi but has shifted his activities elsewhere.

His men are known for launching attacks and kidnapping of villagers and travellers in Sabon Birni, Rabah and Isa in Sokoto State, and the influence reaches as far as Katsina State. Halilu has become one of Nigeria's most dreaded bandits, having built a formidable militia of young men and stockpiling weapons. On 13 September 2024, the Nigerian Army confirmed several gang members during a military operation in Mayanchi, Maru. He was reported killed in an ambush the day before. Government troops recovered two rocket propelled grenades and many automatic rifles and ammunition.

=== Kachalla Turji ===
Kachalla Turji, also known as Gudda Turji, is the leader of a bandit group that operates along Sokoto Road, raiding towns, villages and settlements in the area. On 17 July 2021, Turji's main base was raided by security personnel, where they arrested his father. Turji then attacked the villages of Kurya, Keta, Kware, Badarawa, Marisuwa and Maberaya, killing 42, abducting 150 and burning 338 houses. He was originally from Shinkafi.

=== Dan Karami ===
Dan Karami was the leader of a bandit gang, reportedly second-in-command to an Islamic State-linked leader, that operated around Safana, Dan Musa, and Batsari. Karami's group was responsible for kidnapping 300 students from a secondary boarding school in Kankara. On 23 January 2021, Karami was injured during a clash with a rival group headed by Mani Na Saleh Mai Dan Doki over the control of guns, ammunition and stolen cattle. The clash took place at Illela village and killed 20 of Karami's bandits and nine civilians.

He was killed in a joint military operation in north-west Nigeria on 12 April 2025, along with 100 of his suspected followers. Karami had been hiding in the Munumu Forest, where several criminal hideouts were also destroyed. His death followed an attack in which bandits kidnapped 43 villagers and killed 4 in Maigora, Katsina State, earlier that week. Although the Nigerian Air Force previously claimed to have killed him in 2022, his death was confirmed in this operation as a significant blow to banditry in the region.

=== Adamu Aliero Yankuzo ===
Adamu Aliero Yankuzo is the leader of a bandit group that operates in the forested regions of Katsina and Zamfara states. He controls a bandit group numbering about 2,000. Yankuzo was born in Yankuzo village. On 16 June 2020, Yankuzo was declared wanted by the Katsina State Police Command for five million Nigerian naira. Yankuzo's gang has carried out a number of attacks, including the killing 52 people in Kadisau village in revenge for the arrest of his son on 9 June 2020. He was declared wanted after his gang members confessed to the kidnapping of innocent villagers, killing of women and rustling of more than hundreds of cattle.

=== Bello Turji ===
Bello Turji Kachalla is the leader of a bandits and kidnappers gang that operates in Zamfara and Sokoto States. He is known to have imposed levies on many villages and appointed leaders in two of the eastern Sokoto villages. He is notorious and ruthless as shown by him refusing to accept ransom after he kidnapped the father of the Zamafara House of Assembly speaker which eventually led to the elderly man's death. He was said to have little of Western education and did not even complete Islamic education. According to lecturer Dr. Murtala, Turji's group members are from an influential family, some of whom include Umaru Nagona, Mallam Ina Manara, and Bello Kagara.

=== Jihadist groups ===
ISWAP and Boko Haram have both claimed to have carried out attacks in northwest Nigeria, and some bandit groups have claimed to have formed alliances with the jihadist groups. In a phone call intercepted by American intelligence in October 2021, an unnamed jihadist group and a bandit group discussed kidnapping operations and negotiations between the groups. Boko Haram is also believed to have sent specialized personnel, including bomb makers and military advisors, as well as military equipment to the Kaduna state to train and equip their bandit groups' allies.

Lakurawa is active in northern Nigeria. Initially organized as a vigiliante militia to fight against bandits, the group became increasingly radical as well as oppressive. By 2023, it had effectively become another bandit group as well as aligned itself with Islamism and possibly even the Islamic State.

As of April 2025, Borno State Governor Babagana Zulum reported that Boko Haram's renewed offensives and kidnappings signaled that the region was losing ground to insurgents. Boko Haram and ISWAP's actions led to significant civilian casualties and displacement, especially in north-eastern Nigeria.

Ansaru, a jihadist group linked with al-Qaeda, is believed to have been operating in Kaduna State. It is believed they enter Nigeria through the porosity of the Niger and Benin borders with Nigeria. After going silent in 2013, Ansaru began attacking Nigerian military and police personnel and infrastructure, including an ambush of a Nigerian military convoy on 15 January 2020. Most of these terrorist and bandit groups have turned some forests in northern Nigeria to their operational base. In March 2020, Kaduna State Governor Nasir El-Rufai stated that there will be no negotiation or pardon for bandits and terrorist groups in the state.

== Refugees ==
At least 247,000 people have been displaced and 120 villages have been razed in continuing bandit activity in northwest Nigeria. At least 77,000 of the displaced have been forced into Niger's Maradi Region, where cross-border raids and attacks continue. At least 11,320 refugees have been successfully relocated.

== See also ==
- Communal conflicts in Nigeria
