= Tangaza =

- Town and LGA
- Interactive map of Tangaza
- Location within Nigeria
- Coordinates: 13°31′N 4°58′E
- Country: Nigeria
- State: Sokoto State
- Capital: Gidan Madi

Government
  - Local Government Chairman: Isah Salihu Bashir Kalanjeni

Area
  - Total: 2,477 km^{2} (956 sq mi)

Population (2006)
  - Total: 113,853
  - Density: 45.96/km^{2} (119.0/sq mi)
- Time zone: UTC+1 (WAT)
- 3-digit postal code prefix: 841
- ISO 3166 code: NG.SO.TZ

Tangaza is a town and Local Government Area in Sokoto State, Nigeria. The headquarters is Gidan Madi.

Tangaza shares a border with the Republic of Niger to the north. It has an area of 2,477 km^{2} and a population of 113,853 at the 2006 census.

== Climate/Geography ==
Tangaza LGA has an average temperature of 34 degrees Celsius or 93.2 degrees Fahrenheit and a total area of 2477 square kilometres or 956 square miles. The area is expected to receive 1,150 mm (45 in) of precipitation year, while the average wind speed in the LGA is 10 km/h (6.2 mph).
