= Gudu =

Gudu Karamar Hukumar Gudu
- LGA
- Nickname: Land of Promise
- Motto: Striving Towards Advancement
- Interactive map of Gudu
- Location in Nigeria
- Coordinates: 13°28′N 4°26′E
- Country: Nigeria
- State: Sokoto State

Government
  - Chairman: Buhari Amadu Kurdala

Area
  - Total: 3,478 km^{2} (1,343 sq mi)

Population (2019)
  - Total: 139,000
- Time zone: UTC+1 (WAT)
- 3-digit postal code prefix: 841
- ISO 3166 code: NG.SO.GU

Gudu is a Local Government Area in Sokoto State, Nigeria. Its headquarters are in the town of Balle.

With an area of 3,478 km^{2} and a population of 95,544 at the 2006 census, with an estimated population of 139,000 in 2019. Gudu shares a boundary with the Republic of Niger to the north and the west, Kebbi state to the south, Binji LGA to the southeast, Tangaza LGA to the east. In 1804 Gudu was the capital of the Sokoto Caliphate.

Gudu is divided into three districts, each headed by District's Head (Uban Ƙasa). Namely:-

Bachaka District. comprised Bachaka, Chilas/Makuya and Gwazange/Boto Wards. Headed by: Alhaji Aminu Abdullahi Bachaka.

Balle District. Comprised Balle, Ƙarfen-Chana, Ƙarfen-Sarki and Marake Wards.

Headed by:

Kurdula District. Comprised Awulkiti, Kurdula and Tullun-Doya Wards.

Headed by: Alhaji Suleiman Magawata.

Gudu also comprises ten divisional registration areas (wards):

- Bachaka
- Kurdula
- Balle
- Karfen-Sarki
- Karfen-Chana
- Marake
- Awulkiti
- Chilas/Makuya
- Gwazange/Boto, and
- Tullun-Doya.

The postal code of the area is 841.
