= Maru, Nigeria =

Maru
- LGA and town
- Interactive map of Maru
- Location in Nigeria
- Coordinates: 11°36′N 6°17′E
- Country: Nigeria
- State: Zamfara State

Government
  - Local Government Chairman: Yusuf Sani Bindi

Area
  - Total: 6,654 km^{2} (2,569 sq mi)

Population (2006 census)
  - Total: 291,900
  - Density: 43.87/km^{2} (113.6/sq mi)
- Time zone: UTC+1 (WAT)
- 3-digit postal code prefix: 890
- ISO 3166 code: NG.ZA.MU

Maru is a town and Local Government Area in Zamfara State, Nigeria.

It has an area of 6,654 km^{2} and a population of 291,900 at the 2006 census.

The postal code of the area is 890.

== Climate ==
The dry season is mostly cloudy during the year, while the wet season is oppressive and mostly cloudy.

Maru's temperature is rising due to climate change; the graph shows warmer and colder years.

== Gallery ==
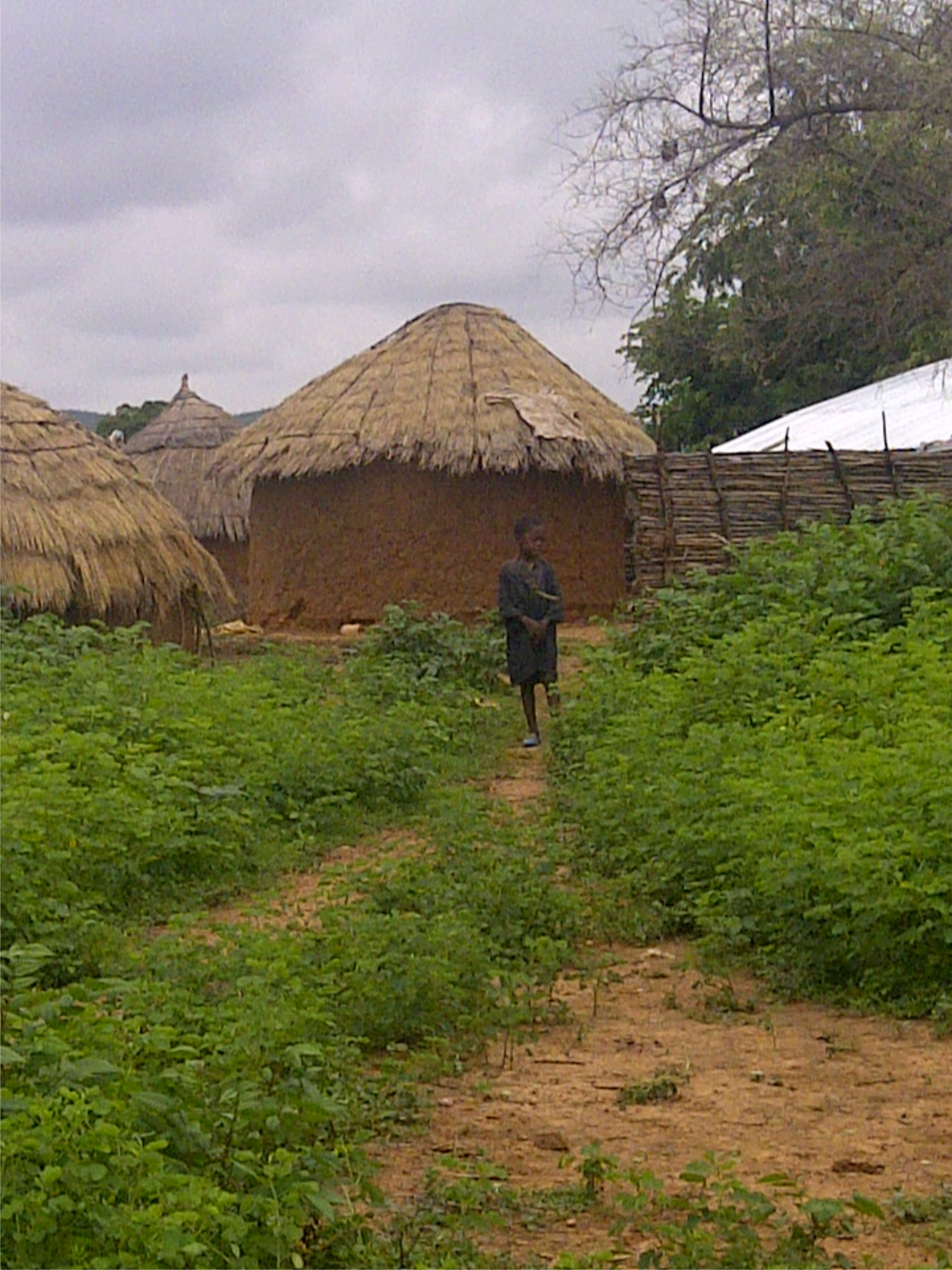
A boy in Maru Local Government Area

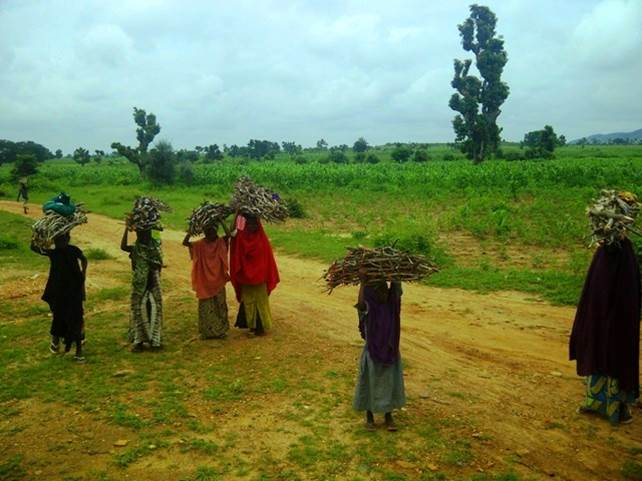
Gathering firewood in Kanoma Ward
