= Sabon Birni =

- LGA and town
- Interactive map of Sabon Birni
- Location within Nigeria
- Coordinates: 13°33′40″N 6°19′30″E
- Country: Nigeria
- State: Sokoto State

Government
  - Local Government Chairman: Ayuba Hashimu Dan Tudu

Area
  - Total: 2,354 km^{2} (909 sq mi)

Population (2006)
  - Total: 207,599
  - Density: 88.19/km^{2} (228.4/sq mi)
- Time zone: UTC+1 (WAT)
- 3-digit postal code prefix: 842
- ISO 3166 code: NG.SO.SB

Sabon Birni is a town and Local Government Area in Sokoto State, Nigeria.

Sabon Birni shares a border with the Republic of Niger to the north. It has an area of 2,354 km^{2} and a population of 207,599 at the 2006 census.

The postal code of the area is 842.

== Climate ==
With a yearly temperature of 34 °C (93 °F), 4.47% warmer than the national average for Nigeria, and 50.53 days with precipitation, Sabon Birni, Nigeria, has a subtropical steppe climate.

=== Temperature ===
From March 20 to June 2, the hot season, which has an average daily high temperature exceeding 38 °C (101 °F), lasts for 2.4 months. With an average high temperature of 39 °C (103 °F) and low temperature of 28 °C (82 °F), May is the hottest month of the year in Sabon Birni. The average daily maximum temperature during the 1.7-month mild season, which runs from December 10 to January 31, is below 32 °C (89 °F). With an average low temperature of 16 °C (61 °F) and high temperature of 31 °C (87 °F), January is the coldest month of the year in Sabon Birni.
