= Bello Matawalle =

Nigerian politician (born 1969)

Minister of State for Defence
- Incumbent
- Assumed office 21 August 2023
- President: Bola Tinubu
- Minister: Mohammed Badaru Abubakar; Christopher Gwabin Musa
- Preceded by: Olusola Obada (2012)

5th Governor of Zamfara State
- In office 29 May 2019 – 29 May 2023
- Deputy: Mahdi Mohammed Gusau (2019–2022); Hassan Nasiha (2022–2023)
- Preceded by: Abdul'aziz Abubakar Yari
- Succeeded by: Dauda Lawal

Personal details
- Born: Bello Muhammad; 12 February 1969 (age 57) Maradun, North-Western State (now in Zamfara State), Nigeria
- Party: All Progressives Congress (2021–present)
- Other political affiliations: United Nigeria Congress Party (1998–2003); All Nigeria Peoples Party (2003–2011); Peoples Democratic Party (2011–2021)
- Spouses: Aisha Matawalle; Balkisu Matawalle; Fatimah Matawalle; Sadiya Matawalle
- Education: Yaba College of Technology; University of West London
- Occupation: Politician; teacher

Bello Muhammad popularly known as Bello Matawalle (born 12 February 1969) is a Nigerian politician and teacher who has served as the minister of state for defence since 2023. He previously served as the governor of Zamfara State from 2019 to 2023.

After briefly serving in the Abacha-era state house of assembly and serving as a state commissioner from 1999 to 2003 in the Ahmad Sani Yerima administration in the Fourth Republic, he first won an elected office in 2003 as a member of the House of Representatives for Bakura/Maradun and retained the office until 2015 first as a member of the All Nigeria Peoples Party before switching to the People's Democratic Party in 2011. Four years after losing his Bakura/Maradun Constituency seat in 2015, Matawalle became the 2019 PDP gubernatorial nominee and won the office after a Supreme Court ruling disqualified the original winner. In 2021, he defected from the PDP to the All Progressives Congress after a defection rally in Gusau alongside most Zamfara State elected officials.

== Early life and education ==
Bello Muhammad was born 12 February 1969, in Maradun, which at the time was in the North-Western State. He obtained First School Leaving Certificate from Maradun Township Primary School in 1979.

== Political career ==
Matawalle worked as a teacher at Government Girls College, Moriki and Kwatarkoshi before joining the Federal Ministry of Water Resources. Matawalle's first shot in politics was in 1998 when he ran for a house of assembly seat and won after he left the Federal Ministry of Water Resources, Abuja, joining the defunct United Nigeria Congress Party (UNCP) which consisted of politicians such as Ambassador Isa Aliyu Mohammed Argungu (Sarkin Yakin Kabbi) former Minister of Water Resources and National Chairman of the party, Ibrahim Gusau former pro tem National Chairman of the party, Atiku Abubakar, Abdullahi Aliyu Sumaila, Attahiru Bafarawa, Adamu Aliero, Suleiman Takuma, Ibrahim Kura Mohammed, Ibrahim Saminu Turaki and Kabiru Ibrahim Gaya but after the death of Sani Abacha, Nigerian Military Head of State on 8 June 1998, Abdulsalami Abubakar, his successor, dissolved the political parties and announced that elections would hold in 1999.

Between 1999 and 2003 he served as Zamfara State Commissioner for Local Government and Chieftaincy Affairs, Commissioner for Environment, Rural Development and then Commissioner for Youth and Sports.

Matawalle was elected into the House of Representatives by his constituents Bakura/Maradun in May 2003 on the platform of the defunct All Nigeria Peoples Party (ANPP).

Matawalle was re-elected in 2007 still on the platform of the ANPP only to defect to PDP on which platform he was re-elected for a third term in 2011.

Matawalle polled 189,452 in the March polls as against the 534,541 votes for Muktar Idris, the APC candidate.

Muktar Idris was at first, issued the certificate of return, however, the court of appeal in Sokoto ordered that the INEC should withdraw the certificate.

The Supreme Court later pronounced that the votes cast for the APC in the election as wasted and ordered that the candidate with the second highest votes be sworn in on Wednesday. This is because the APC failed to conduct primary election for all the candidates in Zamfara State.

In May 2023, shortly before Matawalle's term as governor concluded, the Economic and Financial Crimes Commission (EFCC) announced an investigation into him for allegedly diverting N70 billion from the treasury of the Zamfara State government. In September 2024, the EFCC has committed to revisiting these corruption allegations against the former governor. EFCC spokesperson Dele Oyewale made this statement while addressing a group of protesters at the commission's headquarters in Abuja, who were advocating for a renewed investigation into Matawalle.

=== Defection to APC ===
On 1 June 2021, Matawalle dissolved his Executive Council, reportedly in preparation for a party switch to the APC set to happen around June 12. Matawalle however, denied that the cabinet dissolution was connected to a party switch and claimed to have not made a decision on changing parties nor set a date.

On 27 June, President Muhammadu Buhari's Personal Media aide Bashir Ahmad said Matawalle had joined the APC. The party switch was later confirmed by Matawalle's spokesperson Ibrahim Dosara, who said Matawalle would formally announce the defection on June 29. On June 29, Matawalle, along with all 3 Zamfara Senators, 6 of 7 Representatives, and all 24 House of Assembly members, officially switched to the APC at a rally in Gusau attended by other APC Governors; notably Deputy Governor Mahdi Mohammed Gusau and Anka/Mafara Representative Kabiru Yahaya remained in the PDP. Mai Mala Buni, Yobe State Governor and APC Caretaker Chairman, immediately dissolved all party caretaker committees in Zamfara State and appointed Matawalle as Zamfara APC Leader.

== Controversy ==
=== Corruption Allegations ===
The Economic and Financial Crimes Commission has assured the public it will continue with the alleged ₦70 billion corruption case against the Minister of State Defense, Bello Matawalle during his tenure as the Governor of Zamfara State from 2019 to 2023. The APC AKIDA Forum is appealing to the investigating Matawalle alleged mismanagement of public funds during his tenure as Governor for Zamfara State and his involvement in the famous arms deal scandal. On May 18, 2023, the EFCC announced that it was investigating Allegations of extensive corruption, fraudulent contract awards and the misappropriation of more than ₦70 billion by Matawalle.

=== Alleged Bandit sympathies ===
The current Governor of Zamfara State Dauda Lawal said Matawalle is alleged to have procured Vehicles for bandit leaders, including a notorious kingpin, Bello Turji and others while serving as Zamfara State Governor. He said Matawalle kept terrorists at the government house, and ransom was paid to terrorists through the government. Matawalle purchased 34 brand new 2019 Model Hilux and distributed to the terrorists leaders like Ado Aleru, Bello Turji, Halilu Subububu and others. On 10 July 2024 Bello Turji said Matawalle amnesty only empowered some of his colleagues premium times reported that Turji said he killed one of the bandit leaders in his Shinkafi LGA for peace to reign, but Matawalle allegedly sabotage his efforts.

=== Lack of security background ===
As a surge of bandit attacks gripped Nigeria in December 2025, Matawalle's prior utterances again came in view. It was reported by various outlets that there was increased pressure to replace both the minister of Defense (Mohammed Badaru Abubakar) and minister of state for defense (Matawalle). Neither of them had any defense or security experience, and were seen as sympathetic to the bandits based on their utterances in the media.

On Dec 2, 2025, Mohammed Badaru Abubakar resigned "for health reasons" and was replaced by the former chief of defense staff, gen Christopher Musa who retired just a few weeks prior.

== Personal life ==
Matawalle is married to four wives and has children.
