= List of villages in Zamfara State =

This is a list of villages and settlements in Zamfara State, Nigeria organised by local government area (LGA) and district/ward.

== By postal code ==
Below is a list of villages and settlements organised by postal code.

== By electoral ward ==
Below is a list of polling units, including villages and schools, organised by electoral ward.

LGA	Ward	Polling Unit Name
Anka	Bagega	Bagega I/Kanwuri; Bagega II/Makaranta; Tubuki/Garka; Mallamawa/Pri. Sch.; Kawaye I /Makaranta; Kawaye II/Kanwuri; Dawon -Jiya/Kanwuri; Duza/Pri. Sch; Dangazau/Pri. Sch; Dutsi/Garka; Zamfarawa/Pri. School; Kasumka/Pri. School; Makakari/Pri. School
Anka	Barayar-Zaki	Barayar-Zaki/Kanwuri; Rafin-Gero/Kanwuri; Tungar Godai/Gidan Hakimi; Tungar Namore/G/Hakimi; Dutsin Dan - Ajiya/G/ Hakimi; Raiya/Kanwuri; Jigawa/Kanwuri; Bardi/Kanwuri; Mallamawa/Pri. Sch.; Laho/Laho; Sallah/Pri School; Shiyar - Liman/Limanchi; Shiyar S/Gari/Sabon Gari; Tungar Dangido/Tunga; S/Gari Sala/S/ Gari; Tungar Geza/Geza; S / Garin Tigalla/Tigalla
Anka	Dan Galadima	J. N. I./Primary School; Dandambe/Garkar Dandambe; Alh. Kanti/Gidan Alh. Kanti; G. S. S./Secondary School; Gargam/Garkar Hakimi; Tungar Dan Galadima/Garkar Hakimi; Model Pri. Sch./Primary School
Anka	Matseri	Gima I/Pri. Sch; Kwanar Maje I/Pri. Sch.; Kwanar - Maje II/Dispensary; Girkau/Kanwuri; Tudun Rogo/Gidan Hakimi; Tumba/Kanwuri; Matseri/Pri. Sch.; Maiduma/Kanwuri; Mahuta/Gidan Hakimi; Gadar- Manya/Kanwuri; Manya Gali/Pri. School; Babban Baye/G/Hakimi; Geben Dan Ba'U - Kanwuri; Gima II/Dan Bedi; Gima III/Garka; Kangon Girkau/Girkau; Zaga/Zaga; Manya/Manya Garka; Matserin Fillani/Matserin Fulani; Katumbure/Katunbure
Anka	Sabon Birini	Shiyar Magaji - Gidan Hakimi; Shiyar Galadima/Gidan Galadima; D/Saulawa/Pri. School; Baudi Pri./School; D/Kirungu/Pri. Sch.; Gobirawa/Pri. Sch.; Bawar Daji/Pri. Sch.; Doka/Gidan Hakimi; Matankari/Gidan Hakimi; Farar Kasa/Pri. Sch.; Hayin Bawa/Primary School; Zanoka/Garkar Bawa; D/Kurya/Gidan Hakimi; Akuzo/Gidan Hakimi
Anka	Waramu	Waramu/Pri. Sch.; Moda/Pri. Sch.; Birnin-Tudu/Pri. Sch.; Keya/Gidan Hakimi; Shabli Nasarawa/G/Hakimi; Shabli/Primary School; Tungar-Tsaka/Pri. Sch.; Tungar Dutsi/G/Hakimi; Wano/G/Hakimi; Tungar Dangaya/G/Hakimi; Shiyar Tudu Primary School; Shiyar Liman/Garkar Liman; Cikin Gulbi/Bakin Gulbi; Shamdam Kware/Kware
Anka	Wuya	Asibitin Kutare/G/Hakimi I; Asibitin Mutane/G/Hakimi II; Makaranta/Pri. Sch.; Dan Mai Ganga/G/ Hakimi; Doka/G/ Hakimi; Jarkuka/Pri. School; G/Nabarau/Kan Wuri; Tamgaram/Pri. School; Rumu/Rumu; Indumbula/Kan Wuri; T/Shehu/Gidan Hakimi; Gidan Ja'O/Kan Wuri; Zamfara Anka Galadima; Zamfara Anka Magaji
Anka	Yar'sabaya	Bardoki/Danbedi; Yar Sabaya/Pri. School; Yar Tasha/Yar Tasha; Yar Matankari/Pri. School; Bagada/Garka; Matukuda/Gidan Hakimi; Awala/Awala; Kito/Kito Centre; Kamfani/Dan Hili; Yargaba/Danbedi; Ruwan Zabo/Garka
Bakura	Bakura	Gidan Bala I/Women Centre; J. N. I./Islamiya School; Sh/Ubadawak/Village Head Office; Dan Garge/Adult Edu. Class; Sabon Gari /Secondary School; Gidan Bunu/Vet Clinic; Kanwuri I/District Head Office; Fadamana/Garka Fadama; Ya'Nhudu/Adult Edu. Class; Dan Fili I/Vet Clinic; Gidan Rijiya/Adult Class; Gidan Tambari/Asibitin Kutare; Maradi/Village Head Office; Tulluwa II/Centre; Kofar Bai/Baiti; Kasuwar Daji I/Union Office; Yar Sauki/Arabic Class; Tulluwa III/Clinic (Junction); Dan Fili II/Dan Fili; K/Daji II/Old Motor Park; Kanwuri II/Area Court Room; Gidan Bala II/Dan Fili
Bakura	Damri	Damri I/Model Primary School; Damri II/Village Head Office; Sade/Pri. Sch.; Sabon Gari / Primary School; Chikari/Adult Edu. Class; D/D Mazauda/Pri. Sch.; Sabon Gari/Adult Class; Saturu/Village Head Office; Gidan Maikidi/Adult Edu. Class; Damri III/Women Centre; T/Yamma II/Adult Edu. Class
Bakura	Dankadu	Dankadu I/Model Pri Sch.; Dankadu II/Village Head Office; Madacci I/Model Primary School; Madacci II/Adult Edu. Class; T/Maiburtu /T/ Maiburtu; Dambo I/Model Pri. Sch.; Dambo II / Adult Edu. Class; Rumba / Adult Edu. Class; Rogoji / Adult Edu. Class; Sullubawa / Pri. Sch.; Badamma / Badamma Pri. Sch.; Gwargawo / Pri. Sch.; Rane/ Primary School; Barade/ Adult Education Class
Bakura	Dan Manau	Kabawa / Pri. Sch.; Balgare / Pri. Sch.; T/D/Manau / Adult Class; Nagarawa / Pri. Sch.; Dan Manau / Model Pri Sch.; Gamji / Gamji Pri. Sch.; L/Bakura / Pri. Sch.; K/Kalgo / Pri. Sch.; Rakuma / Adult Edu. Class; Gidan Dikko / Adult Edu. Class; B/Masa / Forest Office; Hutsere / Adult Edu. Class; Yar Rimaye / Adult Edu. Class
Bakura	Yar Kufoji	Titi Model Primary School; Barnawa / Women Centre; Fadamawa / Shiyar Fadamawa; Yarce Diya / Yar Cediya; Tsamiya / Tsamiya; Kwalkwalawa I / Adult Class; S/Tudu / Model Pri. Sch.; Awala/ Village Head Office; Taurawa/ Pri. Sch; Kanwuri / Kanwuri
Bakura	Dakko	Dakko I / Model Pri. Sch.; Dakko II /Village Head Office; Butsa / Adult Edu. Class; Nagarawa / Adult Edu. Class; Kwatsama / Pri. Sch.; T. S. Daji / Adult Edu. Class; K/Malam / Pri. Sch.; Fagam / Adult Edu. Class; T. Ango Dogo / Forest Office; Dogon Madacci / Pri. Sch.
Bakura	Rini	Gidan Oroji / Adult Edu. Class; Gidan Galadima/Adult Edu. Class; Gidan Harande / Primary School; Sh / Galadima I / Model Primary School; Sh / Kofa I / Women Centre; Sh/Kofar II / Adult Edu. Class; Sh / Galadima I / Village Head Office; Sh / Galadima II / Rima Office
Bakura	Yar Geda	Yargeda / Primary School; Gurbi / Adult Edu. Class; Adarawa/ Adult Edu. Class; Gainakawa / Yarcediya; Gidan Kalgo / Garkar Hakimi; Kabawa / Pry. Sch.
Birnin Magaji/Kiyaw	Birnin Magaji	Gidan Dawa/ Shiyar Maigari; Gidan Kyabda / Pri. Sch.; Magare I / Kofar Magare; Magare II / Dan Fili; Shiyar Ardo/ Area Court; Shiyar Galadima I / Primary School; Shiyar Galadima II/ Tsamiyar Dutsi; Shiyar Liman/ Filin A. Kadangara; Shiyar Magaji/ Garkar Magaji; Shiyar Maidawa / Model Pri. Sch.; Shiyar Zarumai I./ Library; Shiyar Zarumai II/Karamar Asibiti
Birnin Magaji/Kiyaw	Danfami Sabon Birini	Buntume I / Kofar Magaji; Buntume II / Shagon Ada; Dan Fami I / Shiyar Magaji; Dan Fami II / Shiyar Galadima; Danwala / Bakin Masallaci; Gidan Kaso I / Shiyar Maidamma; Gidan Kaso II / Shiyar Bawale; Gidan Namaganga/Shiyar Dan Indo; Sabon Birnin Dan Ali I Pri. Sch.; Sabon Birnin Dan Ali II / Shiyar Hakimi; Shamushale I /Shiyar Sabon Gari; Shamushale II/ Shiyar Wakili; Danturmi / Shiyar Ada Indiya
Birnin Magaji/Kiyaw	Gusami Gari	Ung. Gamji / Shiyar Galadima; Gidan Goje / Gidan Dan Bakano; Gidan Ibro / Kofar Gidan S/Yaki; Maijan Ido / Primary School; Jela / Kofar Gidan M. Wakkala; Shanawa / Gidan Tudu Gado; Shiyar Galadima Gusami / Kofar Gidan Hakimi; Shiyar Marafai I / Primary School; Shiyar Marafai II / Shiyar Marafa; Hayinwakili / Kofar Gidan Tamban
Birnin Magaji/Kiyaw	Gusami Hayi	Mai Kuru / Kofar Gidan S/Gari; Gidan Duna / Shiyar Magaji; Masha Awo / Kofar Gidan Ajiya Idi; Maradawa / Maradawa; Morai /Morai / G/D/Babba; Sakeen Kade / Kofar Gidan A Labbo; Gidan Bajini / Kofar Gidan Bajini; Gidan Joli / Kofar Gidan Joli; Mazauda / Mazauda
Birnin Magaji/Kiyaw	Modomawa East	Gidan Dan Marafa / Garkar Hakimi; Gidan Namuniya / Garkar Hakimi; Kirifada / Primary School; Nadosara / Garkar Hakimi; Rura / Garkar Hakimi; Tasha / Primary School; Sabon Gari / Garkar Hakimi; Sitasi / Primary School; Yar Gusau / Garkar Hakimi; Birdid / Birdid; Gidan Katakare / Kofar Gidan Katakare
Birnin Magaji/Kiyaw	Modomawa West	Challi / Primary School; Danlami / Garkar Hakimi; Garka I / Maradawa; Garka II / Masaka; Gidan Rabo / Primary School; Gobirawa / Garkar Uwaisu; Sakkere I / Primary School; Sakkere II / Garkar A. Hakimi; Shiyar Galadima / Garkar Mai Gari; Kofar Modomawa / Asibitin Modamawa; Zinare / Kofar Gidan Mazara; Dadi-Marafa / Kanwuri; Nasarawa / Garka
Birnin Magaji/Kiyaw	Nasarawa Godal East	Chigama I / Garkar Hakimi; Chigama II / Shiyar Baraya; Gidan Dan Dambo / Garkar Hakimi; Gidan Kaka / Kofar Gidan Kaka; Katsinawa / Garkar Marafa; Kokiya I / Shiyar Galadima; Kokiya II / Shiyar Sabon Gari; Marakawa / Kofar Gidan Hakimi; Tsabre Gari / Primary School; Tsabre Tunga / Tsabre
Birnin Magaji/Kiyaw	Nasarawa Godal West	Dibgawa /Garka; Kukkubi / Shiyar Marafa; Gidan Dan Sama / Pri. Sch.; Jaddawa I / Primary School; Jaddawa II / Garkar Marafa; Maigamo / Garkar Marafa; Shiyar Daudu I / B/ Gidan Ladan; Shiyar Dauda II Gidan Tsalha Liman; Shiyar S/Diya / B/ Gidan Liman; Shiyar Galadima / Rimi; Shiyar Magaji / Kofar S/Aski; Shiyar Magaji Abu / Hel Kota; Tsamaiku / Kofar Magaji
Bukkuyum	Adabka	Shiyar Sarki I, Garka Hakimi; Shiyar Sarki II, Primary School; Alkama / Yar Innuwa; Duhuwa / Primary School; Matusgi / Yar Kasuwa; Garara / Garkar Hakimi; Jargaba / Pri. Sch; Ganar Kiyawa / Kasuwa; Tibis / Garka Hakimi; Dadin Duniya I / Fage; Dadin Duniya II / Dogon Daji; Fasagora / Garka Hakimi; Katafana / Dan Fage; Yar Tasha / Dan Bedi; Yar Kusa / Garka Hakimi; Kembane / Dogon Yaro; Dogon Daji / Garka Hakimi; Natsira / Yar Runfa; Zungura / Hili
Bukkuyum	Bukkuyum	Shiyar Galadima / Dan Bedi; Shiyar Uban Dawaki / Women Centre; Shiyar Magaji I / Mahada; Bukkuyum I / Primary School; Shiyar Magaji II / Primary School; Masu I / Primary School; Masu II / Yar Inuwa; Sadawa / Yarmarece; Godai / Dogonyaro; Rayau / Primary School; Solli I / Yar Tsamiya; Buzuzu / Garkar Abu; Tudun-Gandu / Inwala; Gidan Garbe / Yarkuka; Solli II / Mazauna; Tsilli Gidi / Masaka; Jauga / Garkar Audu Arna; Bukkuyum II / Garkar Hakimi
Bukkuyum	Gwashi	Gwashi I / Primary School; Gwashi II / Township; Akawo I / Primary School; Koren Magaji / Mahada; Dalas / Kasuwar Dare; Mazarora / Danhili; Gando / Primary School; Mairairai / Danbedi; Baruba / Yarcediya; Duma / Mazauna; Rugar Baba / Dogon Yaro; Yar Kanki / Wurin Hira; Akawo II / Yar Inuwa; Kayan Bago / Yar Kasuwa; Katsalle / Kasuwar Rana; Batan Warka I / Hili; Lokoja / Garka Garba; Batan Warka II / Dan Hili; Mashagwado / Yar Kasuwa; Karare / Centre; Mukunawa Dutsi / Yar Innuwa; Tungar Yara / Mai Yara; Tungar -Zabo / Yar Zabuwa
Bukkuyum	Kyaram	Kyaram / Primary School; Ruwan Kura / Yar Kura; Nannari / Primary School; Kairu I / Primary School; Kairu II / Dan Fage; Takalafiya / Mailafiya; Kado / Yar Runfa; Balhi / Hilin Wasa; Tungar Mairakumi / Rakummai; Rakimu / Primary School; Wawan Iccen Ibran / Yan Itace; Zuga I / Primary School; Wawan Iccen Salihu / Garka Salihu; Gayawa / Kwakwara; Gidan / Gunta / Dan Gunta; Uli / Dan Uli; Zuga II / Mazuga
Bukkuyum	Nasarawa	Nasarawa / Shiyar mmagaji A; Shiyar mmagaji B; Shiyar mmagaji C; Zango A; Zango B; Tabalaya; Sabon Gari; / Gurusu /Primary School; Dangamji /Primary School; Gana / shiyar haido; Galamu/ Primary School; Kamaru / Primary School;
Bukkuyum	Masama	Masama/Primary School; Kasara/Shiyar Kasarawa; Shiyar Ajiya I/Shiyar Ajiya; Shiyar Ajiya II/Ajiyawa; Sabuwar Tunga/Yar Tunga; Rukumawa / Yar Rukumawa; Tunga Bawa / Garka Bawa
Bukkuyum	Ruwan Jema	Kurfar Danya / K / Danya; Rafin Maiki I/ Rafin Maiki; Gasahular Mande / G / Mande; Gasahular Bako / G / Bako; Koraf Magaji / K / Magaji; Gemawar Dikko / Gemawar Dikko; Tudun Buruji / T / Buruji; Dogaye / Dogaye; Gyado / Gyado; Shiyar S / Diya / S / Diya; Mai Zango / Mai Zango; S / Uban Dawaki/ Shiyar / U / Dawaki; Tungar Dutsi / T / Dutsi; Rafin Maiki / Rafin Maiki II; Tudu / Tudu
Bukkuyum	Yashi	Ruwa Rana / Ruwa Rana; Yashin / Yashin Makera; Dan Gazau / Dan Gazau; Abare / Abare; Bangana / Ban Gana; Balala / Balala; Bindin Baya / Fagen Hutu
Bukkuyum	Zarummai	Zara / Shiyar Zara; Farananawa I / Primary School; Dargaje I / Pry. Sch.; Dan Zamau / Pry. Sch.; Dan Zaure / Dan Bedi; Mallamawa / Garkar Hakimi; Rumbuki / Garkar Hakimi; Yar Galma / Garkar Hakimi; Fura-Girke / Primary School; Dangurunfa 1/ Primary School; Ranfashi / Primary School; Mafarar - Garangi / Dan Hili; Tungar Dusti / Garkar Hakimi; Kwali / Garkar Mai Gari; Bunkasau / Garkar Hakimi; Dan Gurunfa II / Garkar Hamimi; Farnanawa II / Chediya; Dargaje II / Chediya; Zurumai I / Pri Sch; Zurumai II / Shiyar Auwal
Bukkuyum	Zauma	Zauma / Primary School; Shiyar Magaji / Garka Saidu; Tilli Warai / Shiyar Warai; Gidan Mai Gunya / Yar Mai Gunya; Babbar-Marna / Yar Marna; Yandu / Garkar Yandu; Shiyar Gado / Shiyar Gado; Shiyar Hakimi / Garkar Hakimi; Shiyartalla / Garka Hakimi; Tudun Maniya / Garkar Liman
Bungudu	Bingi North	Kanon Magaji I / Bakin Gidan Marafa; Kanon Magaji II/Primary School; Kadusa I/Primary School; Kadusa II/Bakin Masallachi; Maje/ Fada Haki/Bakin Gidan Hakimi; Kasasa/Bakin Gidan Hakimi; Kwabtari/Primary School; Ruwan Kaiwa/Bakin Gidan Hakimi; Doruwa / Bakin Tasha; Doka / Bakin Gidan Hakimi; Gidan Saro / Primary School; Bingi/Shiyar Liman / Pri. Sch.; Unguwar Dangeda / Bakin Gidan Hakimi; Tazame / Bakin G/Hakimi; Kangon Sabuwal / Pri. Sch.; Mashema / Bakin Gidan Hakimi; Dagwalgi / Bakin Gidan Hakimi; Gidan Malami / Bakin Gidan Hakimi; Galma Hannu / Bakin Gidan Hakimi; Fanda Hakki / Bakin Gidan Hakimi; Kuya / Bakin Gidan Hakimi; Bingi/Shiyar Ajiya / Dispensary
Bungudu	Bingi South	Kungurmi I / Bakin Gidan Hakimi; Burai / Primary School; Makwai Durkai I / Bakin G/Hakimi; Tudun Wada / Bakin G/Hakimi; Ladan Daji / Landai; Fan Karfe / Bakin Gidan Hakimi; Gidan Son Allah/ Bakin G/ Hakimi; Rogoje / Bakin G/ Hakimi; Yar Wutsiya / Bakin G/ Hakimi; Mayaba / Bakin G/ Hakimi; Chediya / Bakin G/ Hakimi; Mayebe / Bakin G/ Hakimi; Kiluta / Bakin / Gidan Hakimi; Tukurwa / Bakin / Gidan Hakimi; Unguwar Bare-Bari / Bakin Gidan Hakimi; Kurar Mota I / Primary School; Kangon Marafa I / Primary School; Bakin Dutse / Bakin Gidan Hakimi; Kun Kelai / Bakin Gidan Hakimi; Ruwan Mesa / Bakin Gidan Hakimi; Kungurmi II / Pr. Sch.; Kurar Mota II / Bakin Gidan Hakimi; Makwa / Durkwai II / Dan Hili
Bungudu	Bungudu	Mallamawa I / Primary School; Kukoki / Vet Office; Galadanci / Magama; Birnin Malan / Primary School; Shiyar Idi/ S/ Birni Dan Hili; Gobirawa / Dan Hili; Limanci I / Bakin Gidan Liman; Kasha Ruwa / Primary School; Yar Tukunya / Primary School; Gidan Dangwari / Bakin Gidan Hakimi; Limanci II; Mallamawa II / Dan Hili; Fada I/ Bakin Gidan Sarki; Fada II / Magama Fada; Mallamawa III / Dan Dabi; Tudun Yan Sarki/ Bakin Gidan Hakimi
Bungudu	Furfuri/Kwai-Kwai	Sabon Birnin I / Pri. School; Sabon Birnin II / Dan Hili; Galadanci /Bakin Ofishin Maigari; Kware I / Dan Hili; Kware II / Magama; Runji I / Bakin Gidan Mai Unguwa; Runji II / Bakin Gidan Na Runji; Guga / Bakin Gidan Hakimi; Shirgi / Bakin Gidan Hakimi; Madidi/ Bakin Gidan Hakimi; Auki / Pri. Sch.; Kwai-Kwai / Bakin Gidanhakimi; Kukar Nini / Bakin Gidan Hakimi; Fantaru / Pri. Sch.; Zaman Gira / Bakin Gidan Hakimi; Gwaji / B / G / Hakimi; Gidan Gagga / Bakin Gidan Hakimi; Kukar Mada / Bakin Gidan Hakimi; Kuga / Bakin Gidan Hakimi; Mai Gije / Bakin Gidan Hakimi; Auki / G/ Ja'E /Bakin Gidan Ja'E
Bungudu	Gada / Karakkai	Sabon Birin / Primary School; Fada Gada / Bakin Gidan Mai Gari; Gidan Bawa/B/G/ Alh. Bawa; Rugga / Bakin Gidan Hakimi; Damba / Dispensary; Awala / Bakin Gidan Mai Unguwa; Ruggar Kassarawa / Bakin Gidan Mai Unguwa; Ruggar Kaiwa / Bakin Gidan Mai Unguwa; Barzo /Bakin Gidan Mai Unguwa; Magungutsa / Bakin Gidan Mai Ungunwa; Kukoki / Bakin Gidan Mai Unguwa; Fada Dan Magori / Bakin Gidan Hakimi; Baicen Dan Magori / Bakin Gidan Hakimi; Markau / Bakin Gidan Hakimi; Dan Marke / Bakin Gidan Hakimi; Ruguzawa / Primary School; Marmara / Dan Hili; Fadamawa / Bakin Fadama; Gidan Masu / Bakin Gidan Hakimi; Ruggar Tudu / Bakin Gidan Hakimi; Gidan Goje / Bakin Gidan Hakimi; Markau/Kankara / Dan Hili
Bungudu	Nahuce	Modamawa / Bakin Gidan Hakimi; Mallamawa I / Bakin Gidan Hakimi; Kanon Magaji I / Bakin Gidan Magaji; Dajen Yamma / Dan Hili; Dajen Gabas / Primary School; Gwargwabe / Bakin Gidan Hakimi; Ruggar Buda / Primary School; Ganuwaje I / Bakin Gidan Hakimi; Bargaja / Bakin Gidan Hakimi; Kofar Gabas / Bakin Gidan Hakimi; Dan Daji / Bakin Gidan Hakimi; Baicen Yamma / Bakin Gidan Hakimi; Ganuwaje II / Bakin Gidan Hakimi; Masari / Dan Hili; Gidan Masaka Kaba / Dan Hili; Dirfa / Magama; Muhammadu Nahuce / Bakin Gidan Hakimi; Leka Zagi / Bakin Gidan Hakimi; Baicen Gabas / Dan Baice; Kofar Yamma / Bakin Kofa Yamma; Mallamawa II / Dan Hili
Bungudu	Kwatarkwashi	Marerawa Hayi / Dan Hili; Sabawa / Bakin Gidan Hakimi; Marerawa / Bakin Gidan Mai Unguwa; Rusawa / Bakin G/Sarki; Kangiwa / Pri. Sch; Limanci / Bakin Gidan Liman; Kagara / Bakin Gidan Hakimi; Tazame / Primary School; Gamraki / B/Ofishin Magaji; Kwaren Tsauni / Bakin Gidan Mai Unguwa; Zaman Ruwa / Bakin Gidan Mai Unguwa; Tunfafi / Bakin Gidan Mai Unguwa; Unguwar Dan Hillai / Primary School; Gyatta / Gidan Algo / Primary School; Unguwar Dunya / Bakin G/Hakimi; Farar Kasa / Tambake / Bakin Gidan Hakimi; Aisha /Tuku Dawa / Bakin Gidan Hakimi; Gulubba / Kware / Primary School; Sullubawa / Banfa / Rikin / Primary School.; G/Zama /G. Yawa/Kofi / Bakin Gidan Hakimi; Turmuzawa/Yar Tsakuwa / Bakin Gidan Mai Unguwa; Unguwar Dunya/Fara Kasa / Bakin Gidan Hakimi; Sullubawa / Bakin Gidan Hakimi
Bungudu	Rawayya/ Bela	Kofar Gabas I / Bakin Gidan Rashi; Kofar Gabas II / Bakin Tasha; Maigizare I / Bakin Gidan Hakimi; Maigizare II / Dan Hili; Kurmi / Bakin Gidan Hakimi; Yar Masaka / Dan Hili; Kwage / Bakin Gidan Hakimi; Kofar Yamma / B/Rimi; S/Birni Gabas / Bakin Gidan Mai Unguwa; S/Birni Yamma / Bakin Gidan Hakimi; Jaurin Gabas I / Bakin Gidan Hakimi; Jaurin Gabas II / Dan Hili; Jaurin Yamma / Bakin Gidan Hakimi; Marke I / Bakin Gidan Hakimi; Marke II / Dan Hili; Tudun Wada / Primary School; Yar Labe / Bakin Gidan Hakimi; Sakkarawa I / Bakin Gidan Hakimi; Sakkarawa II / Dan Hili; Daza / Primary School; Gidan Bunu I / Ofishin Hakimi; Gidan Jelani I / Dan Hili; Gidan Goje / Bakin Gidan Hakimi; Bela/Asko I / Primary School; Ruggar Kaya / Primary School; Maje / Primary School; Kaida / Primary School; Lango / B/G/Hakimi; Gidan Bunu II / B / G / Bunu; Gidan Jelani II / B / G / Jelani; Bela/Asako II / Dan Hili
Bungudu	Samawa	Samawa Gabas / Ofishin Mai Gari; Samawa Yamma / Bakin Gidan Mai Anguwa; Birnin Gide / Bakin Gidan Hakimi; Yar Samawa / Bakin Gidan Hakimi; Yar Kwabe / Bakin Gidan Hakimi; Gidan Wakaso / Bakin Gidan Hakimi; Gidan Gyare / Bakin Gidan Hakimi; Kwatta / Primary School; Kwabo Shiryar Wakili / Bakin Gidan Hakimi; Dan Bina / Bakin Laraba / Primary School; Kwatta /Gidan Zalla / Dan Hili
Bungudu	Sankalawa	Sankalawa I / Primary School; Sabon Gida/Kwaire / Primary School; Kura I / Primary School; Homawa / Bakin Gidan Mai Anguwa; Bakwanta / Primary School; Kurmi / Bakin Gidan M/Anguwa; Gidan Zai/Dubewa / Dan Hili; Ribe / Primary School; Yashi/Kware / Bakin G/M/Gari; Zaboro / Bakin Gidan Mai Unguwa; Sankalawa II / Bakin G/Hakimi; Kura II / Bakin Gidan Hakimi; Ribe II / B/G/Hakimi; Kawari / Bakin Gidan Hakimi
Gummi	Bardoki	Gwalli M. / Primary School; Yar Gusau / Kan Wuri; Kibli Gari / Kibli Kan Wuri; Awala/Makaranta; Karaje / Makaranta; Tulmi I / Primary School; Tulmi II / Kan Wuri; Pass / Zawiiyya; Bardoki / Primary School; Galko / Makaranta; Gutsura / Makaranta; S/Tudu / Kan Wuri; Bardoki / Kan Wuri; Tagadi / Kasuwa; Barikin Daji / Makaranta; Sahon Kibli / Sh-Liman; Bardoki / Kan Tudu; Lanke Kibli / Makaranta; Babban Rafi / Hanya Gulbi; Dadu / Bakin Kasuwa
Gummi	Falale	Kan Wuri / Falale Dispensary; Iyaka / Bakin Dutsi; Kan Wuri / Iyaka / Primary School.; Kukoki / Kukoki; Maikusa / Maikusa; Kofar Gulbi I / Bakin Gulbi; Ung. Galadima I / Garkar Dikko; Ung. Galadima II / Falale Dispen.; Ung. Galadima III /Sabon Gari; Kofar Gulbi II / Bakin Gulbi; Iyaka II Sh/G. Fari / Garkar G. Fari
Gummi	Felfeldu / Gamo	Jabaka / Primary School.; Gamo / Sh/ Yamma; Gidan Garbe / Dan Hayi; Dan Dogo / Kasuwa; Wawan Icce / Primary School; Malan Kara / Makaranta; Naniya / Bakin Kasuwa; Sh. Gabas / Bakin Gulbi; Gidan Magaji / Yar Kofa; Gidan Jando / Gidan Jando; Yar Gari / Garkar Mai Gari
Gummi	Gayari	Sh. Anna I / Pri. Sch.; Dakawar Magaji / Makaranta; Sabon Gari I / Dan Fili; Sh. Kwarga / Gayari Dispen.; Tungar Anna / Bakin Kasuwa; Dakawar Dikko / Bakin Kasuwa; Adarawa I / Primary School; Madatai / Primary School; Budun-Makaranta / Primary School; Adarawa II / Bakin Kasuwa; Sh. Anna II / Hanyar Gulbi; Sabon Gari II / Sabon Gari; Sh. Bajana I / Fadama; Sh. Bajana II / Katai; Gayari T / W / Tsamiya; Matsiri / Adult Edu. Class
Gummi	Gyalange	Gidan Chindo I / Kan Wuri; Dangwai Rafi / Bakin Kasuwa; Gidan Chindo II / Kofar Birni; Gabtu I / Dispensary; Gabtu II / Yar Runfa; Dangwai Baba / Dispensary; Masama Danawo / Bakin Kasuwa; Gidan Chindo III / Tasha; Gidan Chido IV / Makaranta; Gidan Chido V / Makaranta; Gidan Chido VI / Ung. Hassan; Gidan Chido VII / Kofa; Dan Awo / Adult Edu. Class; Masoni / Bakin Rijiya
Gummi	Illelar Awal	Sh. Kanwuri / District Office; Tusuru / Bakin Kasuwa; Kurfa / Makaranta; Gambadar D/Jafa / Pri. Sch.; Rijiyar Fari / Yar Runfa; Gambadar Maigiro I / Pri. Sch.; Falan Birin / Bakin Kasuwa; Gambadar Maigiro II / Dan Fili; Ung. Gamji / Yar Chediya; Gambadar Maigiro III / Pri Sch.; Falan Tsibiri / Primary School; Saran Gumawa I / Bakin Kasuwa; Saran Gumawa II / Sabon Layi; Gambadar Hanya I / Makaranta; Gambadar Hanya II / Makaranta; Takatsaba / Adult Edu. Class; Katse Gani / Yar Runfa
Gummi	Magajin Gari	Sh. Magaji / District Office; Barebari I / Kofar Gago; Baraya / Maje; Sabon Gari I / Adult Edu. Class; Amanawa / Amanawa Clinic; Sh. Mai Gurmi / Mai Gurumi; Abubakar Moh'D / Primary School; Barebare II / Dantani; Sh. Fadama I / Yarrunfa; Yar Dutsi / Bakin Kasuwa; Sh. Kabobi / Kabobi; Sh. Fadama II / Vet I; Sh. Fadama III / Vet II; Kofar Shanu / Mayanka; Sh. Tulle / Tulle; Sabon Gari II / Kololo; Gidan Audu / Marina; Kundan M. Sani / Kunda; Tudun Baushi / Baushi; Sabon Gari III / Agege; Gidan Illo / Adult Edu.; Sh. Barai / Sosa; Kofar Lugui I / Yar Chediya; Sh. Baraya / Dispen.; Kofar Lugui II / Yar Chideya; Barebari / Adult Edu.; Gidan Audun Gwabro / Makina; S/Gari Makaranta IV / Primary School
Gummi	Shiyar Rafi	Makera Fari / Makera; Masha Yar Maje / Dispen.; Sh. Marna / Babar Marna; Yar Kusana / Yar Kwana; Yar Kuda S/Rafi / Yar Kuda; Lema Jibo / Adult Educ.; Lemar Kaji / Babanlayi; Yar Kwana / Yar Kwana; Aliyu Isa / Model Primary School; Lemawa / Sabon Layi; Gobirawa / Bakin Tafki; Zabarmawa / Kantudu Kasuwa; Gidan Na'Ide / Babar Garka; Lema Baba Makaranta / Pri. Sch.; G/Malan Maikoko / Bakin Tafki
Gusau	Madawaki	Katsaura I / Garkar Sarkin Gusau; Katsaura II / Garkar Magaji Salihu; Katsaura III / Bakin Silma; Katsaura VI / Garkar Kambari; Katsaura V / Garkar Yusuf Bayarrabe; Kastaura VI / Dan-Dusti D/Angola; Katsaura VII / Garkar Zakari; Katsaura VIII / Yar Chediya G/D/Mai Sule; G. R. A. I / Rest House; G. R. A. II / Mahuta Pri. Sch.; G. R. A. III / G/Mai Yara; G. R. A. IV / Health Cenre; Abarma / Primary School Abarma; Katsaura IX / B/Kasuwa/Kofar Yan Hatsi; Katsaura X / B/Kasuwa/Kofar Yan Buhu; Katsaura XI / Bayan Masallacin Jumma'A; G . R. A. V / Bayan Masallacin Tsamiya; G. R. A. VI / G. S. S Gada Biyu; Katsaura XII / Filin Na'Yawo G/Labbo; Katsaura XIII / Garkar Sarkin Gusau
Gusau	Mayana	Gidan Maishanu I / Garkar Mai Shanu; Mahaukacin Gida / Danbedin M/Gida; U. M. Bookshop / Bakin \Round About\'; Dogon Dabino / Shiyar D/Dabino; Dutsin Tsafi/Shiyar Dutsin Tsafi; Yar Bola Zara / Shiyar Yar Bola Zara; Aisha Mai Rariya / Garkar Aisha; Kuka Mai Zuma / Bedi Yar Kuka; Gidan Mallam Yahaya/Garkar M. Yahaya; Hajiya Maimuna/Garkar H. Maimuna; Samanja Hassan/Garkar S. Hassan; Sharu Albela/Garkar Sharu Albela; Abachi Mai Goro/Garkar Abacha Mai Goro; Mai Garin Bauchi/Garkar Mai Garin Bauchi; Dan Daura/Fili Dan Daura; Haruna Jada / Birin Ruwa; Hilin Dan Kamasho/Garkar Dan Kamisho; Yaro Yar Gada/Garkar Y. Y. Gada; Isah Jibiya/Garkar Isah Jibiya; Shugaba Almu/Garkar Shugaba Almu; Dan Komotso I/Garkar Dan Komotso; Health Clinic / Durumi Sa'A; Kuka Mai Sheka/Shiyar Kuka Mai Sheka; Gidan Dan Gana/Garkar Dan Gana; Unguwa Maigoro/Unguwa Maigoro; Kasharuwa/Kasharuwa Pri. Sch.; Gidan Mai Dawa/Adult Educ. Office; Gidan Dan Kado/Garkar Mai Unguwa; Dan Galadima Waziri/Garkar Dan G. Waziri; Chediya Ukku/Filin Chediya Uku; Takachame/Garkar A. Kafinta; Zawiyya I /Bakin Gulbizawiyya; Filin Gunza I/ Tashar Zawarawa; Marinar Dan Kwaido/Garkar Dan Kwaido; Shagari Clinic I/Shagari Clinic Office; Mayana I/Ofishin Mayana; Marna/Marna C/Gari; Hanya Bajini / Garkar Bugaje; Dan Durumi/Unguwar Kade; Hannat Clinic/Hannat Clinic Office; Kolo/Garkar Kolo; Honhon Maishanu / Fillin Gari; Mayana Office II / Garkar Dan Gana; Gidan Mai Unguwa / Garkar Mai Unguwa; Zawiyya II /B/Gulbi Zawiyya; Fillin Gunza II/Garkar Mai-Wuya
Gusau	Rijiya	Rijiya I / I Kan Wurin Sarki; Rijiya II / Rijiya Primary School; Maradawa / Rijiya Primary School; Yan Shawara / Garkar Mai Unguwa; Gidan Kaura / Garkar Mai Unguwa; Kaikace / Garkar Mai Unguwa; Marake / Garkar Mai Unguwa; Agama Lafiya Garkar Mai Unguwa; Gidan Kada - Garkar Mai Unguwa; Baguda / Garkar Mai Gari; Garwaye Garkar Mai Gari; Gidan Fakkan Garkar Mai Unguwa; Geba Garkar Mai Unguwa; Duru / Garkar Mai Unguwa; Galadima / Zabi Gidan Mai Unguwa; Ngaski Mai Unguwa; Geba Gabasawa / Garkar / Mai / Unguwa; Bayawuri / R. Kusa Garkar Mai Gari; Gidan Doka Garkar Mai Gari; Adarawa Garkar Mai Gari
Gusau	Ruwan Bore	Ruwan-Bore I / Primary School; Dan Gwani / Primary School; Tshuna /Garkar Mai Kudi; Bawa Na Fada I / Garkar A/Tagana; S/Makera / Bakin Masallaci; Takoka/Fantaru / Garkar Sarkin Noma; Kundumai I / Dan Hili; Ingwai / Tsouwa / Garkar Mai Ung.; Kundumai II / Pri. Sch. Kundumai; Nasarawa / Garkar Mai Unguwa; Ja'Oji / Garkar Mai Unguwa; Gidan S'Noma / Garkar Mai Unguwa; Gora Wake / Garkar Mai Unguwa; Kantawa / Primary School Kantawa; Unguwa - Mai Jatau / Garkar Mai Unguwa; Gangara / Garkar Mai Unguwa; Lafiya / Garkar Mai Unguwa; Dan Bina / Dispenary Dan Bina; Koshiya / Garkar Mai Unguwa; Butsa / Garkar Mai Unguwa; Bawa Na Fada II/ Kan Wuri Sarki; Dan Gwari / Marake; Kukar Gandu / Dan Hili; Lafiya D/Kaura / Tudu; Ruwan Bore II / Islamiya School
Gusau	Wanke	Gidan Gabi / Garkar Mai Unguwa; Dokau / Pri. Sch. Dokau; Gidan Ango / Pri. Sch.; Nasarawa I / Pri. Sch.; Nasarawa II / Gobirawa; Dumma / Pri. Sch.; Jeri I / Garkar Mai Ung.; Jeri II / Pr. Sch.; Jira I / Garkar Mai Ung.; Jira II/Garkar Mai Ung; Bakin Wa I / Garkar Mai Ung.; Bakin Wa II / Garkar Mai Ung.; Wanke Gabas I / G/H Nana; Wanke Gabas II / Primary School; Wanke Yamma I / Garkar Mai Unguwa; Wanke Yamma II / Bakin Masalachi; Gidan Kado I / Kan Wuri; Gidan Kado II / Bakin Masallachi Falam; Dogon Daji I / Bakin Masallachi; Dogon Daji II / Garkar Mai Ung.; Madaro I / Garkar Mai Ung.; Madaro II / Garkar Mai Unguwa B/Dusti; Madaro III / Garkar Mai Ung.; Kazauda / Garkar Mai Ung.; Gidan Malam / Garkar Mai Ung.; Tungar Haki / Garkar Hakimi; Jangeme / Pri. Sch.; Bokawa / Garkar Mai Ung.; Akuzo / Garkar Mai Ung.
Gusau	Wonaka	Wonaka I / Bakin Masalachi; Dunkulawa / Pri. Sch.; Gidan Ma'Aji I / Dan Hili; Tambalawa / Dan Hili; Gidan Mai Jiro / Kofar Kaiwa; Mai Aiki / Garkar Sani; Lilo / Sarki Yaki I / Lilo Pri. Sch.; Togai / Merged Pri. Sch.; Lilo/ S/Yari I / Primary School; Gidan Aljani I / Garkar Mallam Mande; Gidan Bachiri / Garkar Bachiri; Fura Girke / Pri. Sch. Fura Girke; Kofa / Yar Tsamiya; Gidan Maiwada I / Ung. Makera; Gidan Maiwada II / Garkar Mai Wada; Kamari I / Hayin Tsamiya; Kamari II / Marna; Ajja / Yar Yara; Rafi / Garje; Gidan / Nawajje / Garkar Sarkin Fawa; Bantsa / Bakin Masallachi; Doka / Kukar Fulani; Wonaka II / Pri Sch.; Gida Mai Wada II / Pri Sch.; Kofar Fulani / Unguwar Dono; Kafi / Dan Hili; Wonaka III / Bakin Kasuwa; Gidan Ma'Aji II / Dan Bedi; Dunkulawa II / Dan Hili; Ajjar Fulani / Gyarawa; Lilo / Limanchi
Kaura Namoda	Banga	Dandambo / Sh. Danbo; Dan Makulle / Shiyar Dan Makulle; Dan Tabki / Shiyar Dan Tabki; Katsaura / Shiyar Sabon Gari; Kawari / Sh. Kawari; Kogi (I) / Shiyar Indajiya; Rahazawa I / Shiyar Rahazawa; Shiyar Jijji / Kofar Jijji; Shiyar Tsahiru / Kofar Tsahiru; Sakkere / Shiyar Sakkere; Shiyar D/Kogi - Kofar D/Kogi; Shiyar Sarki - Kofar Sarki; Makera / Yar Kasuwa; Rahazawa II / Kofar Hakimi; Kogi (II) / Kogi Pri Sch; Banga / Model Pri. Sch.
Kaura Namoda	Dan - Isa	Shiyar Siba / Primary School.; Ruwan Kura / Babban Fili; Mai Lalle J/Kasa / Primary School; Kwalau Tamode / Babban Fili; Gwamma Dawa / Dakin Taro; Gidan Juli / Dakin Taro; G/Gagare / Dan Fili; G/Bako / Shiyar Hakimi; Balitawa / Primary School; Dan Isa / Shiyar Salau; Barnawa / Adult Education Class; Dogon Kade / Primary School.; Doka / Adult Education Class.; G/Alu / Primary School.; G/Badda / Primary School.; Jimrawa / Primary School; Kayatawa / Primary School.; Kaura Zomo /Adult Education Class; Makoro / Babban Fili; Sodingo / Pri. Sch.; S/Unguwa / Adult Edu. Class; Shiyar S/Gari / Dispenary; G/Goje / Kofar Dangiya
Kaura Namoda	Gabake	Gabaken Mesa / Kofar Hakimi; Getso / Kofar Hakimi; Gwammanan / Kofar Liman; Lemu / Kofar Hakimi; Shiyar Ajiya / Kofar M. Wada; Shiyar D/Toro / Kofar M. Maigandi; Shiyar Ma Gayaki / Model Primary School; Shiyar Rafi / Shiyar M. Garba; Tudun Wada Marafa / Shiyar Marafa; Shiyar Galadima / Pri. Sch.; Shiyar Saidi / Kofar Hakimi; Shiyar Kigudu / Kofar Hakimi
Kaura Namoda	Galadima Dan Galadima	Garbawa / Shiyar U/Dawaki; Kasharbawa / Shiyar Gado Mai Nama; Magizawas Kubambi / Primary School; Magizawa Shiyar Uban Dawaki / Shiyar Uban Dawaki; Magizawa Shiyar Magaji / Shiyar Hakimi; Ali Bawa / Shiyar D/Sanda; Baicen Almu / B/Poly Academic; Shiyar Bula / Bore Sh/Tsoho; Gundumi / Sh/Alh. Mode; S/Lugun Saidu / Tudun Anai; S/Malakai / Sh/M. Mamman; Agira / Kofar Barade; Allahuwa / Shiyar Ayya; Dogon Jijji / Shiyar M. Sani; Garka / Shiyar A. Ali; Makaranta / Bashar Primary School; Shiyar Anace / Shiyar S / Fawa; Shiyar Abdur'A Uf / Shiyar Hakimi; Kofar Tsamiya / Shiyar Ali Tela; Shiyar Barayar Zaki / Kofar Samaila Moyi
Kaura Namoda	Kungurki	Daba Yar Kasuwa / Yar Kasuwa; Dayau / Shiyar Aliyu; Disco / Bakin Masallachi; Fagoji / Fagoji Primary School; Shiyar Ajiya / Sh. M. Sa'Idu; Madira / Shiyar Baraya; S/Gari Kaka Mai Famfo / Kofar Kaka Mai Famfo; S/Gari Sani Kyalle / Kofar Sani Kyalle; Shiyar Iro Mai Nama / Kofar Iro Mai Namai; Shiyar Shagon Dan Bus / Kofar Shagon Dan Bus; Shiyar Galadima / Kofar Galadima; Sh/Tudu Bala / Kofar Tudu Bala; S/Noma Gado / Kofar S/Noma Gado; S/Noma Jan Zakawa / Kofar Dan Turai; Walo Mai Ludo / Kofar D/Mai Wake; Gidan Sambo / Kofar Hakimi; Tunga Rairai / Shiyar Hakimi; S/G Durumi Wake / Durumi
Kaura Namoda	Kurya Madaro	Balankabe / Primary School; Shiyar Galadima / Kofar Salama; Garewa / Shiyar Alkali; Guiwa / Shiyar Hakimi; Shiyar Jekada / Primary School; Matankari / Shiyar Mani Daudu; Shiyar Sarkin Yaki / Shiyar M. Bachiri; Shiyar Sarkin Fada / Fada Area; Shiyar Rafi / Sh. Alhaji Musa; Tunga Ajiya / Kofar Ajiya Bala; Tudun Wada / Tudun Wada Area; Magajin Sake / Sh/ Magajin Sake; Ruggar Kosau / Kofar Hakimi; Tozon Kasa / Kofar Hakimi
Kaura Namoda	Kyam Barawa	Famfifi / Primary School; Shiyar Magaji / Kofar Hamza; Shiyar S/Gari / K/Lala Ah; Shiyartudu / Kofar Musan Daji; Shiyar Sabon Gari / Kofar Marafa; Kofar Ya / Shiyar Audu Nasifu; Shiyar Dan Galadima / Magaji Pri. Sch.; Shiyar Magaji / Shiyar S/Tasha; Tukasu / Sabuwar Kasuwa; Zazzaka / Primary School; Yar Shagerawa - Kanka Sabon Gari; Bunaje/ Primary School; Kofar Fada / Shiyar Fada
Kaura Namoda	Sakajiki	Abaniyawa Store / S/ Labbon I; Alko / Shiyar Tudu; Dagwarwa / Shiyar Abasaya; Kabaje / Primary School; Shiyar Maradun / Kofar Maradun; Shiyar Kaka / Pri. Sch.; Sh/Nufawa / Kofar M. D. Nuhu; Unguwar Sarkin Musulmi / Primary School; Badako / Tashar Mota; Zakuwa / Filin Zakuwa; Kwalabdawa / Tulluwa Kwalabdawa; Sh/Alu/Yar Kwana
Kaura Namoda	S/Baura/S/Mafara	Shiyar Karofi / Dangawa; Shiyar Ajiya / Shiyar Hakimi; Sh/Dawakawa / Shiyar Hakimi; Shiyar Jajjaye / Makaranta; Shiyar M. Didi/Kofar M. Didi; Shiyar M. Muhammed / Kofar M. Mu'Azu; Makera / Kofar Isa J/ Saraki; Shiyar Sarki Noman / M. T. D; Tankwaren Daji / Shiyar A. Isah; Shiyar Dan- Durimi / Shiyar Hakimi; Tudun Wada / Shiyar Wakkala; Poly Hostel / Poly Clinic; Asibitin Mata / Kofar Asibitin Mata; Bula Shiyar Sada / Makaranta; Shiyar Sidi Umaru/Kofar Sidi Umaru; Shiyar D/Jimma / Makera; G. R. A. / Makaranta; Kofar Zurmi / Shiyar Nayawo; Matoyar Tuluna / Sh/Dansakola; Shiyar Sarkin Dawaki / Lugun S/Mafara; Shiyar Sama / Kofar Hakimi; Shiyar Dumbami / Kofar Hakimi; Tsohuwar Tasha / Kofar Dandurgu; Gidan Ajinna / Makaranta; T/Dorowa / Kofar Iliya Hakimi; Dan Gawo / B/Makaranta
Kaura Namoda	Yankaba	Majingi / Shiyar A. Ambaye; Sabon Gida/ Shiyar Hassan D/Ajo; Shiyar Baura / Shiyar M. Yahaya; Shiyar Dandani / Dan Fili; Shiyar Magaji / Shagon Mande; Shiyaryahaya Shiyar A/Barau; Lungun Dangiwa / Shiyar M/Ambaya; Shiyar Audu Gobirawa / Shiyar Hakimi; Shiyar Liman / Kofar Liman; Shiyar S/Makera / Bakin Makera
Maradun	Dosara / Birnin Kaya	Shiyar Gado / Rugga; Unguwar Bakalori / Bakalori; Shiyar Dumamau / Dumamau; Asarara / Fallau; Birnin Kaya / Gabas; Tulluwa / Gidan Bisa; Shiyar Uban Dawaki / Gidan Kano; Idoruwa / Shi/Marafa; Shiyar Galadima I / Dosara Clinic; Bak Yasuwa / Bak Yasuwa Primary School; Shiyar Galadima II / Dosara; Maje / Dan Baza Primary School; Shiyar Ajiya / Model Primary School; Damrawa / Sabuwar Tunga; Danbaza / Dispensary
Maradun	Damaga / Damagiwa	Shiyar Tsara / Damaga Gari; Shiyar Danyaki / Gidan Dan Yaki; Karimawa / Shiyar Sarki Ask; Gwabro I/ Primary School Area; Shiyar Rafi Galadima / Gama Giwa; Shiyar Yama / Gama Giwa Primary School; Zaman Gira / Filin Zaman Gira; Kuddu / Dan Fili Kuddu; Gwabro II / Gwabro Primary School; Kyansali / Danfili
Maradun	Faru / Magami	Shiyar Bunu / Danfili; Shiyar Yan Ruwa / Bangi; Shiyar Maidawa / Warri; Rudunu / Bakin Gari; Ruwan Bado / Ruwan Bado Primary School; Elankwashe / Gidan Bisa; Tungar Mairiga / Sh/Mairiga; Shiyar Magaji / Tsohuwar Kasuwa; Faru Model I / Model Primary School; Furu Model II / Dispensary; Kyara / Sh/Adamu; Shiyar Marafa / Kasuwa Mata; Inda Lumu / Dan Fako; Kuzi / Primary School Area; Tungar Bugaje / Mallamawa; Nanau / Duddubi; Iya Da Naka / Sh/Ajiya; Kandare / Jaya; Katabushe / Sh/Makwashi; Shiyar S/Burmi / Sh/Ardo; Sabon Sara / Dan Fili; Shiyar Basharu / Bakin Gari; Awala / Shiyar Saraki; Shiyar Badiye / Kukar Gashe; Kwantsewa / Shiyar Magaji; Tudun Garba / Shiyar Tudu
Maradun	Gidan Goga	Akuzo / Unguwar Yautai; Gyaddu / Primary School Area; Babbar Sabra / Jajani; Gidan Sarkin Aski / Gwantau; Kakin Dawa / Primary School; Malikawa / Dan Fili; Magara / Dispensary; Tungar Kuwa / Rin; Sh/ Galadima / Bara; Shiyar Sarkin Fada/G/Goga Model Primary School; Tukurawa / New Market; Tashar Mota / Yar Kofa; Sakkida / Dan Fili; Shiyar Galadima / Siri; Kware / Tungar Labbo; Tungar Keta / Dan Fili
Maradun	Janbako	Shiyar Magaji / Kadarbe; Shiyar Ajiya / Bakin Kasuwa; Shiyar Dan Kadu / Kyaleta; Shiyar Magaji Yusuf / Primary School; Bachaka / Shiyar Bachaka; Santar Ige / Dan Fili; Ung. Maijatau / Kogon Mai Jatau; Badiyawa / Sh/Badiye; Baberu / Dumal; Sakkidar Bayan Dusti / Sakkida; Sakkidar Magaji / Shiyar Magaji
Maradun	Kaya	Yar Chediya I / Primary School; Yar Chediya II/ Bakin Chediya; Sububu / Yar Kasuwa; Indire / Yar Gona; Tangyalloli / Tan Gyalla; Ido Ruwa / Bakin Ruwa; Dan Bayawa / Yar Aduwa; Dangaladima / Kaya; Baiche / Baichen Kaya; Takalmawa / Bakin Gulbi; Gidan Anna / Kofar Anna; Shiyar/Dagwarga / Filin Dagwarga; Jeka / Bulu; Illela / Illela Primary School; Kindigahe / Primary School Area; Dankamoji / Primary School. Area; Tungar Baushi / Shiyar Baushi; Shiyar Fada / Bakin Gebe; Bare-Bari/Shiyar Bare-Bari
Maradun	Maradun North	Kofar Kyarawa I/ Unguwan Hayatu; Kofar Kasuwa / Kofar Ladan Fako; Kofar Kyarawa II / Shiyar Dan Chibi; Sh/ Galadima / Gidan Dawa Primary School; Sh/Rafi / Sabon Gari; Karen Buki / Unguwan Sarkin Fulani; Dale / Primary School; Shandame / Jihiya; Gidan Runji / Dan Fili; Al Jimmar Hausawa / Primary School; Al Jimmar Fulani / Primary School; Kani Kawa / Dan Fili
Maradun	Maradun South	Kofar Yamma / Jss; Sh/Abarshi / Baiche; Model Primary School Area / Model Pri. Sch.; Kofar Duhu I / Shiyar Dan Baba; Kofar Duhu II / Shiyar Mai Yara; Layin Daji / Bayan Tasha; Tungar Magaji / Primary School Area; Sh/ Dan Iko / Bakin Ruba; Huda / Yar Kofa; Karbo / Dan Fili; Tungar Malammai / Bakin Ruba Malamai; Buga - Buga / Dan Fili; Kofar Yamma / Bakin Kasuwa; Kwantarowa / Bakin Ruba
Maradun	Tsibiri	Shiyar Gamoji / Gamoji; Shiyar Tudu / Magama Biyar; Tsohon Birnin / Bayan Masallachi; Shiyar Tudu / Tsibiri Pri. Sch.; Shiyar Magangari / Magama Biyar; Shiyar D/Galadima / Yar Balbejiya; Shiyar Usman / Bakin Kasuwa; Shiyar Magaji / Dan Gawo; Alfabara / Zazzaka; Tsohon Birni / Primary School
Maru	Bindin	Mallamawa / Model Primary School Bindin; Kan Wuri / Garka Hakimi; Unguwan Mangwaro / Dan Mangwaro; Makada Zambuna / Garka Hakimi; Lingyado / Model Primary School; Zaman Noma / Model Primary School; Makeda Lingyado / Garka Hakimi; Bakin Gulbi / Garka Hakimi; Gobirawa / Model Primary School; Gidan Dangawai / Garkar Hakimi; Mazazzabi / Garkar Hakimi; Kalale / Primary School; Kwana / Garkar Hakimi; Fara Doka - Garkar Hakimi; Koli - Garkar Hakimi; Yan Kaina / Primary School; Gidan Makera / Garkar Hakimi; Maizambuna / Garkar Hakimi; Jesa / Garka Hakimi; Malele Kan Wuri / Pri. Sch.; Tasa / Garka Hakimi; Ruwan Tofa / Shiyar Magaji; Ung. Doka / Garkar Hakimi; Guru / Garkar Hakimi; Mutunji I / Pri. Sch.; Mutunji II / Garkar Hakimi; Mahuta / Kofar Mani; Maikabarmi / Garkar Hakimi; Gidan Garba / Garkar Hakimi; Mutunji S/Gari / Garkar Hakimi; Ung. Jesa / Garkar Hakimi; Randan Mahuta / Garkar Hakimi; Gazambaa / Garkar Hakimi
Maru	Bingi	Bingi / Primary School; Tungar Mani / Garkar Hakimi; Mallamawa / Primary School; Gabiya / Primary School; Dandaura / Garkar Hakimi; Sabuwar Tunga / Garkar Hakimi; Burwaye / Garkar Hakimi; Gidan Garba / Garkar Hakimi; Bini / Asibiti; Dandindin / Pri. Sch.; Mairairai / G/Hakimi; Gan Daya / G/Hakimi; Makwayo / G/Hakimi; Kwarya Tsugunne / Pri. Sch.; Dan Marke / Garkar Hakimi; Gobirawa / Garkar Hakimi
Maru	Dan Gulbi	Biya / Garkar Mai Unguwa; Burma Kai / Garkar Hakimi; Tsontsomawa D/Hayi / Dan Fili; Dan Gulbi / Asibiti-Asibiti; Manya Ruwaye / G/Hakimi; D/Ma'Aji Makaranta / Pri. Sch.; Garkar / Garkar Hakimi; Tsontsomawa / Garkar Hakimi; Kango / Garkar Hakimi; Sakaina / Pri. Sch.; Marina D/Gulbi / Gangaren Marina; Dan Gulbi Makaranta / Model Pri. Sch.; Bagamus / Garkar Hakimi; Tabanni / Garkar Hakimi; Katoge / Garkar Hakimi; Marina / Ofishin Hakimi
Maru	Dan Kurmi	Saulawa / Yan Sali; Tasha I / Kan Wuri; Fada / Kasuwa Gari; Gudashi / Primary School; Kumbi / Primary School; Hurdi / Garkar Hakimi; Zamfarawa / Primary School; Maimarahu / Primary School; Kasanfani / Primary School; Gidan Mani / Garkar Hakimi; Wabi / Garkar Hakimi; Kaboso / Primary School; Yalwa / Primary School; Manyan Ruwaye / Primary School; Makini / Garkar Hakimi; Getso / Primary School; Unashi / Primary School; Zargado / Primary School; Kuka Birai / Primary School; Daraga / Primary School; Dangodabe / Dan Fako; Farin Ruwa / Asibiti; Dadin Duniya / Garkar Hakimi; Yar Yahaya / Primary School; Ubaka / Primary School; Kashabuda / Ofishin Hakimi; Dogodaji / Primary School; Dankurmi Makaranta / Primary School; Dan Hayi Getso / Grakar Hakimi; Tasha II / Bakin Tasha
Maru	Dan Sadau	Bakin Kasuwa / Bakin Tasha; Sabon Gari / Garkar Muh'D Magini; Yar Doka I / Garkar Sama'Ila Mali; Albarkawa I / Garkar Audu Na Kuja; Kan Wuri / Garka Sarki; Maganawa I / I Garka Mai Unguwa; Un/Na Bungudu / Garkar Hakimi; Ung. Liman / Garkar Hakimi; Madaka / Garkar Hakimi; Karauchi / Garkar Hakimi; Tudun Gabas / Garkar Hakimi; Mai Goge / Pri. Sch.; Mai Awaki / Pri. Sch.; Mallamawa / Garkar Hakimi; Kura Mota / Pri. Sch.; Tashar Sahabi / Pri. Sch.; Dan Amarya / Garkar Sarki; Kwakwachi / Garkar Hakimi; Magama / Garkar Hakimi; Mailamba / Garka Hakimi; Dan Baura / Garka Hakimi; Chabi / Garka Hakimi; Saulawa / Kan Wuri; Bagegawa / Filin Alh. Rabiu; Yar Doka II / Makera; Albarkawa II / Filin Sani Zarin Giwa; Tashar Sahabi / Asibiti Yatasha; Kujemi / Garkar Hakimi; Barikin Daji / Sabon Fegi; Ung. Lalle / Garkar Hakimi
Maru	Kanoma	Gidan Barai I / Primary School; Babege / Garkar Hakimi; Zaman Gira / Primary Sch; Kwantaragi / Maraya Dorai; Tsibiri / Asibiti; Gidan Barai II / Primary School; Kangiwa / Sabon Fegi; Magayaki / Garka Magaji; Yanguzau I / Kankara; Baya Wuri I / Garkar Yarimawa; Asha Lafiya / Garkar Hakimi; Dutsi Gari / Primary School; Talli Mahuta / Garka Hakimi; Rayau / Asibiti; Limanchi Birni / Primary School; Manya Daudu / Garka Hakimi; Turmuzawa Garkar Hakimi; S/Fawa / Asibiti; Yanyawa / Garkar Hakimi; Majen Sani / Manje / Garkar Hakimi; Kwankirawa / Garkar Hakimi; Yanguzau II / Primary School Kankara; Maraya / Garkar Hakimi; Bayawuri II / Yarimawa
Maru	Kuyan Bana	Dandalla / Primary School; Madadda / Garkar Hakimi; Ung. Majidadi / Garkar Hakimi; Dan Gurgu / Primary School; Babba Doka / Primary School; Ma Allo / Garkar Hakimi; Fammaji / Garkar Hakimi; Kaboro / Primary School Kaboro; Sangeku / Garkar Hakimi; Kalgo / Primary School; Ung. Galadima / Primary School; Zaman Lafiya / Primary School; Mai Tukunya / Garkar Hakimi; Han-Han / Garkar Hakimi; Gobirawa / Garkar Hakimi; Dan Mani / Garkar Hakimi; Dan Dalla Fada / Garkar Hakimi; Gobirawa Kakumo / Garkar Hakimi
Maru	Maru	Saulawa / Tudun Saulawa; Makaranta / Banaga Sule Pri. Sch.; Maidama / Bakin Tabki; Yardunya / Kasuwa Magaji; Nasarawa / Dan Durimi Karami; Kaurar Duma / Dan Durumi Babba; Tsohuwar Kasuwa / Bakin Gulbi; Sabon Birni / Kware; Yar Hudu / Dan Fili; Jabaka / Primary School; Lugga / Primary School; Kadauri / Primary School; Ceboji / Primary School; Dan Gamji / Kan Wuri; Dukki / Primary School; Kadaddaba / Tunga; Bachaka / Maru Area Court; Yar Dunya / Asibiti Dabbobi; Tsika / Shiya Magaji; Tumbus Maru / Tsohon Gidan Sarki; Tushe / Nomadic Pri. Sch.; Ung. Kwasau / Garkarb Hakimi; Gwamma Nan / Kuka / tsohuwar tasha maru / Tsohuwar tasha tudu wada
Maru	Mayanchi	Tashagambo/Near Police Station; Makaranta/G/Baki Primary School; Bakin Kasuwa / Runfa Dogo; Gidan Daji/Duhuwa / Garkar Malmakada; Bulukke / Primary School; Garagi/G/Gobirawa/Gidan Gobirawa; Gandun Ardo / Primary School; Gidan Baki / Layin Yan Sanda; Garagi / Primary Sch
Maru	Ruwan Dorawa	Makaranta R/D / Model Primary Sch; Shiyar Galadima / Asibiti; Gidan Ruwa / Tankin Ruwa; Kan Wuri / Offishin Sarki; Yan Shatana / Ofishin Ardo; Kadaddaba / Primary School; Dan Zara / Garkar Hakimi; Sabuwa Kasa / Primary School; Arafa Kan Wuri/Garkar Sarki; Arafa Makaranta/Primary School; Gidan Dankane / Garkar Hakimi; Gidan Danjikko / Primary School; Dibgawa / Garkar Hakimi; Yarguramu Shiyar Galadima / Yar Guramu; Getso / Garkar Hakimi
Shinkafi	Birnin Yaro	Birnin Yaro I / Primary School; Birnin Yaro II/Shiyar Jekada; Birnin Yaro III / Shiyar Marafa Birnin Yaro; Inwala / Inwala Garka; Tubali I / Pri. Sch.; Tubali Baice I / Baice Garka; Tubali Baice II / Baice Dan Fili; Zaman Gira / Primary School; Maiwa / Primary School; Tubali II / Primary School
Shinkafi	Jangeru	Jangeru / Primary School; Tsohuwar Garka / Jangeru T/Garka; Kada Araba I / Kada Araba; Kada Araba II / Yar Herama; Yar Balaso / Yar Balaso; Kurya / Yar Kurya; Shiyar Arna / Sh/Arna; Shiyar Dikko / Gidan Dan Ade; Shiyar Gohe Malam / Sh/ G/ Malam; Shiyar Magaji/Sh/ Magaji; Shiyar Gohe / Garkar Alasan; Baice / Primary School; Shiyar Wakili / Garkar Mamman Wakili; Muda Li'A / Mudali' A; Kayaye / T/Kayaye; Baje I / Filin Masau; Baje II / Baje Primary School; Baje III / Amangawa
Shinkafi	Katuru	Shiyar Baraya I / Sh/Baraya Area; Shiyar Na'Umma / Katuru; Shiyar Audu / Katuru Primary School; Shiyar Baraya II / Katuru Primary School; Garin Goga / Primary School; Barka Da Yabo / Primary School; Kafin Mazuga / Primary School; Zangon Hassi / Zango; Mallamawa / Primary School; T/Kahau / Primary School; Januhu / Primary School
Shinkafi	Shinkafi North	Tashar Maduwa /Bakin Tasha; Yar Shantali / N. T. C; Fushin Gina I / Garkar Alh. Bala; Fushin Gina II / Garkar D/Abu; Ganuwa / Garkar Mai Buhu; Magaji Dango I / Primary School; Magaji Dango II / Primary School; Magaji Dango III / Primary School; Magaji Dango IV / Primary School; T/Adambo / Bakin Comm. Bank; Yar Aduwa I / Sabuwa; Yar Aduwa II / Tsohuwa; Yan Kukoki I / Gidan Addo; Yan Kukoki II / Yan Kukoki; Marna I / Makaranta; Gidan Yalo / Garkar Mamman Yalo; Marna II / Bakin Marina Saule; Shiyar Ajiya / Sh/Ajiya; Yar Marece I / Yan Haya; Yar Marece II / Garage; Shiyar Yar Aduwa / Yar Aduwa; Sabon Garwa / Primary School
Shinkafi	Shinkafi South	Yar Kofa I / Mudalia Area; Yar Kofa II / B/Gida Mai Turare; Fegen Gara I / Bakin Gawo; Fegen Gara II / Bakin Elf Filing Station; Fegen Gara III / B/Gidan Shamba; Fegen Gara IV / Vet. Office; Sabon Gari I / Guraguri Pri Sch.; Sabon Gari II / Guraguri Primary School; Maberaya I / Maberaya Primary School; Maberaya II / Maberaya Primary School
Shinkafi	Shanawa	Shiyar Galadima I / Shanawa Dispensary; Shiyar Galadima II / Centre; Shiyar Rahaje / Kwakwara; Shiyar Ajiya I / Shanawa Primary School; Shiyar Ajiya II / Bakin Kasuwa; Ajiyawa / Primary School.
Talata Mafara	Garbadu	Sh/Magaji / Village Head Office; Tanda Ukku / Bakin Kasuwa; Shiyar Galadima / Sabon Gari; Raha / Primary School.; Shiyar Liman/K /G/Liman; Dutsin Kura / Shiyar Hakimi; Massa / Primary School; Dalam / Primary School; Tungar Mata / Primary School; Tungar Bai / Garkar Hakimi; Sabon Gari / Garbadu Primary School; Yar Kuka / Garkar Hakimi; Dan Kabali / Shiyar Sabon Gari
Talata Mafara	Jangebe	Kan Wuri / Offishin Sarki; Shiyar Magaji / Garkar Ajiya; Yan Hudu / Garkar Galadima; Kasuwar Kande / Tsohuwar Tasha; Kukar Gungama / Pri. Sch.; Tsohuwar Kasuwa / Makera; Gidan Haki / Offishin Hakimi; Jangebe Pri. Sch. / Primary School; Tungar Kasara / Garkar Hakimi Musa; Danbawa / Shiyar Zango; Rumbi / Garkar Hakimi; Tungar Kuka / Offishin Hakimi; Saturun Marna / Marna; Tungar Hayatu / Village Head Office; Maikwanugga / Primary School; Tungar Barza / Village Head Office; Gidan Labbo Zagi / Primary School; Tashar Kuturu / Gidan Mai; Mashaya Rafi / Garkar Rafi; Shanyaya / Vill. Head Office; Tungar Sarkin Noma / Garkar Sarkin Fada; Mashaya Tudu / Garkar Tudu
Talata Mafara	Morai	Shiyar Galadima / Garkar Magaji Gari; Shiyar Uban Dawaki / Mahuta; Shiyar Ajiya / Vill. Head Office; Shiyar Magaji / Primary School; Shiyar Farin Ruwa / Primary School; Sakarawa / Garkar Hakimi; Inwala / Offshin Hakimi; Gidan Nagajara / Garkar Mai Anguwa; Gidan Barade / Primary School; Sado Gari / Clinic; Kasuwar Mata / Islamiya Sch.; Tashar Kabawa/Garkar Hakimi; Kuka Mai Raffu / Pri. Sch.; Dan Fadama / Pri. Sch.; Guza / Tudun Fulani; Garagin D/Kaura / Primary School; Yarbunu / Village Head Office; Tsohon Garin Banaga / Village Head Office
Talata Mafara	Ruwan Gizo	Aci Sannu / Vill. Head Office; Maka / Former Village Head Office; Zauren Gora / Vill. Head Office; Askawa / Garkar Hakimi; Cudi I / Garkar Hakimi; Dan Kalgo / Bakin Masallaci; Kan Wuri / Pri. Sch.; Cudi II / Shadawa; Babbanbaki / Bakin Masallaci; Dan Gazari / Vill. Head Office
Talata Mafara	Sauna R/ Gora	Sh/Galadima / Garkar Galadima; Matsafa / Sh/Hakimi; Gazamna / Garkar Hakimi; Gorar Daji / Primary School; Gwale / Kasuwa; Marinai / Primary School; Tsanu / Primary School; Jigawa / Garkar Hakimi; Shiyar S/Diya / Garkar S/Diya; Tukku / Yar Kasuwa; Tudun Namabi / Garkar Sani; Kasara / Garkar Hakimi; Tabkin Rama / Garkar Hakimi; Yan Boraye / Offisin Hakimi; Rayya / Shiyar Hakimi; Ware Ware / Garkar Hakimi; Kwan Dawa / Primary School; Tungar Rini / Primary School; Sullubawa / Primary School; Shiyar Gabas / Kasuwa; Shiyar Yamma / Bakin Masallachi; Yan Lima / Dan Fili
Talata Mafara	Shiyar Galadima	Township / Pri. Sch.; Dogon Gawo / Yarkurna; Masallacin Jumm'A / Garkar Ubandawaki; Dankura / Bakin Kwakwara; Shiyar Ajiya / Garkar Jekada; Tabkin Busau I / Makera; Kartawa / Garkar Balarabe; Shagon Tukur Mango I / Ministry Of Agric.; Shiyar S/Mafara / Kanwurin Sarki; Dan Jallaba / Garkar Abu Dogo; Gwadara / Garka M. Yusuf; Yalwa / Garka M. Isa; Sh/Lumu / Bakin Masallachi; Dan Rini / Garkar Sa'Idu; Tabkin Busau II / Bakin Kwakwara; Shagon Tukur Mango II / Makarantar M. Sanusi; Shiyar Sanni Gande / Bakin Masallachi; Shiyar Na-Maru / Garkar Na Maru; Tsakuwa / Primary School; Gurbi / Garkar S. Yaki; Basara I / Pri. Sch.; Gemawa / Bakin Masallachi; Tungar Lada / Bakin Masallachi; Complex / Pri. Sch.; Malan Baidu / Garkar Hakimi; Maitako / Kusa Da Masallachi; Gilmamma / Vill. Head Office; Hudodi / Tsamiya
Talata Mafara	Shiyar Kayaye/Matusgi	Tabkin Asaula / Garkar A. Kungu; B/Kasuwa Yamma / Asibitin Dabbobi; Bakin Kasuwa Gabas / Garkar Aliyu; Shiyar/Kofa /Garki Adamu Maimanja; Yanriheni / District Head Office; Asibiti Karama / Clinic; Bakin Banki / Bayan Bank I; Bakin Tasha / Co-Operative; Tashar Mota I / G/Ruwa (Tanki); Gidan S/Yaki / Pri. Sch.; Bakin Zazi / Primary School; Tunfafiya / Primary School; Tungar Magaji / Village Head Office; Bakin Kasuwa Gangare / Filin Yan Buhuhuwa; Tasha Mota II / Bakin Tasha; Duduma / Primary School; Tungar Danga / Bakin Masallaci; Gidan Maba Ganga / Garkar Maba Ganga; Gidan Tudu/Shiyar Tudu; Gidan Ubandawaki / Garkar U/Dawaki; Gidan Mai Baba / Primary School; Dan Dausa / Ofishin Hakimi; Gidan Sadau / Garkar Hakimi
Talata Mafara	Take Tsaba/Makera	Shiyar Yelwa / Primary School; Sh/Iyar Labara / Primary School; Marakku / Village Head Office; Dundaye / Offishin Hakimi; Takoki / Primary School; Gidan Bature / Sh/Gajere; Gidan Bugaje / Vill. Head Office; Inwala / G/ Hakimi; Sh/A./Takoki / G/Hakimi; Sh/Ajiya / Village Head Office; Madagawa / G/Hakimi; Garsa / G/Garsa; Sh/Marafa / Kikika; Tungar Waje / Vill. Head Office; Hura / Primary School
Tsafe	Kwaren Ganuwa	Matsaeri / Danfilin Samari; Shiyar Mayana / Offishin Mayana; Gwanja / Dan Fili; Kauyen Jatau / Filin Jatau; Dan Gulbi / Gulbare; Musawa / Dan Kalgo; Kwarin Ganuwa I / Shiyar Marafa; Kwarin Ganuwa II / Primary School; Shiyar Magaji K/G / Dandali Kwaringanuwa; Mayana Ali / Dandalin Samari; Bawa Ganga I / Primary School; Bawa Ganga II / Dan Fili; Sabon Gari / Dan Fili; Mai Rai-Rai / Filin Rayrai; Ruguza / Ruguzawa; Marbe Ganyaye / Ganye; Marbe Kazama / Dan Fili
Tsafe	Yan Kuzo B	Buke - Buke I / Primary School; Wailare I / Primary School; Unguwan Na Adda / Kofar A. Haru; Santseya / Primary School; Inkwanta / Primary School; Wakare II / Filinjibo /Ba; Buke Buke II / Filin Jobo; Hayin Alh. I / Kofar Nasarawa; Hayin Alh. II / Pri. Sch.; Hayin Alh. III / Sabon Gari; Hayin Alh. IV / Kofar A. Sada; Hayin Alh. V / Makaranta; Gurbi I / Pri. Sch.; Gurbi II / Bakin Kasuwa
Tsafe	Yandoton Daji	Yandoton Daji I / Primary School; Yandoton Daji II / Shiyar Buhari; Yandoton Daji III / Dan Kasheshe; Awala / Primary School; Marke / Primary School; Tashar Dangoje / Makaranta; Dogon Maje / Kofar Majema; Tsaunin Taura / Dan Fili; Biya / Biki / Primary School; Gobirawa I / Garkar Mai Gari; Bayan Banki / Kofar Mai Unguwa; Nasarawa / Dan Fili; Mai Shuwaku / Kofar Fada; Langalanga / Primary School; Gidan Gado / Primary School; Gobirawa II / Kofar Fada
Tsafe	Yankuzo A	Shiyar Kogo / Kofar Marafa; Shiyar S. Aiki / Kofar Yuguda; Shiyar Zango/ Yar Santa; Yankuzo I / Primary School; Takulawa / Primary School; Yankuzo II / Unguwar Joji; Ung. Dodo / Kofar Isah; Yankuzo III / Tsaunin Makera; Dutsin Bika / Kofar Maigari; Danko / Kofar Mai Gari; Unguwan Mande / Falanin Dodo; Mallamawa I / Primary School; Mallamawa II / Kofar Gado; Koli Koli / Primary School; Ung. Alhaza / Filin Sanusi
Tsafe	Danjibga/Kunchin - Kalgo	Danjibga I / Asibiti; Danjibga II / Makaranta; Danjibga III / Danfako; Danjibga IV/ Bakin Masa; Munhaye / Gindin Dunya; Sabon Birin / Gindin Chediya; Ung. Marafa / Kofar Marafa; Kawasari / Dan Fili; Danjibga V / Dan Durmi; Kunchin Kalgo I / Makaranta; Kunchin Kalgo II / Dan Fili; Biya / Dan Fili; Bare-Bari / Kofar Barno; Kolfada / Kofar Fada; Kaura Zomo / Bakin Masa; Makaho / Kafin Makafi
Tsafe	Dauki	Ung. Mai Saje / Danfako; Dauki Kango / Bakin Gulbi; Bedi / Pri. Sch.; Sheme / Shemawa; Ung. Yakubu / Dan Fili; Gangara / Kofar Fada; Gangamai / Fada; Ung. Bayajida / Dandali; Unguwar Bature I / Yaryara; Ung. Bature II / Turbi; Dauki Gari I / Bakin Kasuwa; Dauki Gari II / Sabon Gari; Ung. Nafi'U / Dan Fili
Tsafe	Keta/Kizara	Keta I / Makaranta; Keta II / Asibiti; Keta III / Bakin Kasuwa; Hayin Maru /Primary School; Mai Dagalo / Fadar Hakimi; Chikuraye / Fadar Kura; Nasarawa / Ofishin Nasarawa; Yartsakuwa / Filin Diya; Zamfarawa / Danfako; Kizara / Dispensary; Fadama / Kofar Dama; Ung. Gyauro / Primary School; Dustin Kura / Primary School; Sabon Gari / Filin Gari; Yar Zaiga / Primary School; Kekawa / Dankawo; Kunuku / Dandalin Kunu; Mai Taushi / Filin Damma
Tsafe	Tsafe	Zanga Ali Akilu / Pri. Sch.; Haruna Goga / Dan Filin Goga; Hamisu Direba / Dandurumi; Dan Umma / Filin Saraki; Audu Nababa / Danfakon Babba; Karazube / Baceto; Dansheme / Post Office; Kwakware / Gindin Kesiya; Ruwa Kusa / Buhari Bugashi; Sabon Fegi / Filin Dan Maza; Dispensary / Asibitin Kutare; Bakin Gulbi / Danfako; Kauyen Kane / Dan Fili; Gajin Zama / Primary School; Babban Kauye / Primary School; Katanga / Lizzamiya Primary School; Asibiti Babba / Bakin Dusti; Shantali / Rijiya; Sh/Yandoto / Rijiyar Fada; Sauri / Kofar Balbelu; Mazawaje / Primary School; Liman Dan Bawa / Makaranta; Rimin Alkali / Reader Room; Nasarawa / Primary School; Tudun Wada / Primary School; Gangara / Asibiti; Ruggar Na Ali / Primary School; Makera / Primary School; Tsageru / Primary School; Mangawa / Primary School; Rakyabu / Primary School; Gidan Anne / Yankara
Tsafe	Chediya	Ung. Fada / Primary School; Fakon Hira / Bakin Kasuwa; Awala / Kofar Mai Unguwa; Ung. Sarkin Fawa / Dan Fako; Banma / Dan Filin Ma; Agama Lafiya / Kofar Da; Chediya / Bakin Kasuwa; Danmale / Primary School; Doka / Primary School; Kullutu / Dan Fako; Kware Kwabri / Dan Fili; Unguwar Tofa / Dantema; Unguwar Ummaru / Makarantar Fulani; Sakkiya / Primary School; Bamamu / Gidan Bedi; Bakin Manya / Primary School
Tsafe	Yan Waren Daji	Yanwarin Daji I / Primary School; Yanwarin Daji II / Shiyar Buhari; Yanwarin Daji III / Dan Kasheshe; Tabkin Kazai I / Primary School; Tabkin Kazai II / Primary School; Tabkin Kazai III / Primary School; Nasarawa Kaya / Primary School; Suddu / Dan Fili; Marke / Primary School; Rugumawa / Primary School; Dogon Kawo / Primary School; Dan Amanar Galadima / Primary School; Mandaba / Primary School; Asaula / Garkar Mai Gari; Dan' Amanar Sarki / Dan Filin Samari; Dan' Amanar Dutsi / Kofar Hakimi; Gidan Dankaka / Dan Fili; Bodo / Primary School; Yanza / Primary School
Tsafe	Bilbis	Kucheri I / Primary School; Wanzamai I / Primary School; Wanzamai II / Dan Fili; Ruwa Kusa / Filin Injin; Hayin Sauka / Dan Fako; Gandun Sarki / Primary School; Kofar Dan Dutsi / Bakin Kasuwa; Ung. Chida / Primary School; Auta Makeri / Makera; Dankada / Kadawa; Madawaki Kucheri / Bakin Rijiya; Magazu I / Primary School; Ung. Saye / Dandali; Katanga / Dan Fili; Ung. Rogo / Filin Samari; Magazawa / Primary School; Karda / Primary School; Ung. Dan Halima / Primary School; Buda / Primary School; Nasarawa / Primary School; Machiya / Primary School; Magazu II / Danfilin; Baichi / Dan Filin Dutsi; Magazu III / Sabon Gari
Zurmi	Dauran / Birnin-Tsaba	Maitsaba / Yar Yara; Shiyar Magaji I / Birnin Tsaba Primary School; Shiyar Magaji II / Adult Education Class; Shiyar Iro /Birnin Primary School; Marakakkai I / Town Primary School; Marakakkai II / Bakin Kasuwa; Kabaka / Dan Fili; Doroyi / Dispensary; Kadanya / Town Primary School; Riyoji / Primary School; Torawa / Yar Yara; Ajiyawa / Bakin Kasuwa; Sh/Marafa I / M. P. S. Dauran; Sh/Marafa II / M. P. S. Dauran; Shiyar Marafa III / Bakin Kasuwa; Yar Kaura / Dan Fili; Maganawa / Tsakar Gari; Gorgoyo / Primary School; Sangamawa / Yar Yara; Akutawa / Garkar Mai Gari; Nagi / Bakin Kasuwa; Mindauka / Mararraba; Shiyar Dan Galadima/Matoya
Zurmi	Galadima/Yanruwa	Sabon Gari / Muh'D A Pri. Sch.; Tudun Sansami I / Town Pri. Sch.; Tudun Sansami II / Town Dispen.; Kofar Kasuwa I / Tsohuwar Kasuwa; Kofar Kasuwa II / Mararraba; Baicen Allahuwa / Filin Baice; Tudun Maradun I / Hayi; Tudun Maradun II / J. N. I. Primary School; Ruwan Ido Biyu I / Dan Tudu; Ruwan Ido Biyu II / Dan Tudu; Ruwan Ido Biyu III / Asibiti Yara; Kwangwam I / Primary School; Kayawa / Town Primary School; Alawa / Pri. Sch.; Doguwar Gona / Primary Sch.; Baice Asibiti / Darhela; Hutsaye I / Dan Fili; Hutsaye II / Adult Education Class; Gwalon Kura / Dan Haji; Yar Kuka / Filin Gwari Gami; Garkar Mama Gadau / Adult Edu. Class; Yar Kofa Kwangwami / Dispensary; San Yawa / Asibiti Yara
Zurmi	Kwashbawa	Shiyar Ardo / Adult Education Class; Shiyar Magaji I/ Garkar Magaji; Shiyar Magaji II/ Town Primary School; Shiyar Marafa / Yar Yara; Uban Dawaki / Bakin Kasuwa; Sh/Ajiya/Kofar Ajiya; Mallamawa / Hayin Mallamawa; Gidan Zaki / Mararrabar Hanya; Daudawa / Garkar Liman; Gidan Kada / Primary School; Kore / Garkar Mai Gari; Gidan Kayya / Primary School; Gidan Jaja / M. P. School; Faru / Project Quarters; Magajin Gurbi / Dan Hili
Zurmi	Mashem	Mashema / Adult Educ. Class; Tungar Fulani / Gidan Taba; Tunfa / Garkar Liman; Tungar Nasarawa I / Tunfa Pri. Sch.; Tungar Nasarawa II / Town P. School; Kalage / Town Dispensary; Garkuwa / Dan Tabki; Tungar Habibu / Dan Hili; Ganbiru / Yar Kasuwa; Mashema / M. P. S. Mashema
Zurmi	Kuturu/Mayasa	Shiyar Sarkin Diya / Yar Kasuwa; Shiyar Galadima / Garkar Kuturu; Birane / Town Pri. Sch.; Baicen Birane / Baicen Gabas; Koluwa / Pri. Sch.; Bugawa / Yar Yara; Dadin Kowa / Garkar Mai Gari; Gidan Ladan / Mararraba; Tsakauna / Adult Education Class; Gidan Duwa / Primary School; Gidan Tsika / Primary School; Makosa / Primary School; Kuturu / M. P. School; Duhu / Town Primary School; Tungar Bazace / Bakin Kasuwa; Gotawa Town / Primary School; Yakatawa / B/ Rane/ Yakatawa
Zurmi	Rukudawa	Rukudawa / M. P. S. Rukudawa; Labandi / Primary School; Gidan Gobirawa / Yar Kasuwa; Dunmburum / Town Primary School; Gidan Fulani / Garkar Ardo; Tsanu / Town Primary School; Madobiya Primary School; Mai Rabbana / Yar Tasha; Gidan Madawaki / Pri. Sch.; Kima / Garkar Mai Gari; Kaura Dawa / Garkar Galadima; Gidan Badiye / Garkar Badiye; Lambar Gabas / Baran Baushi; Madudduki / Bakin Gari; Tungar Buzu / Yar Yara; Kawari Bakin Kasuwa
Zurmi	Yan Buki/ Dutsi	Yar Tanbus / M. P. S. Yanbuki; Sh/Makera / Bakin Makera; Rimaye / Town Dispen.; Gidan Barmo / Yar Kasuwa; Dunu / Garkar Mai Gari; Maduba / Primary School; Gidan Zago / Adult Education Class; Gidan Kara / Primary School; Sh/Darma / R. H. C. Dutsi; Sh/Auchi I / M. P. S Dutsi; Maresuwa I / Town Primary School; Maresuwa II / Garkar Mai Gari; Mai Zuma / Primary School; Yar Donuwa / Bakin Kasuwa; Shiyar Auchi II / Yar Kasuwa; Bayan Dutsi / Yar Yara; Tungar Mata / Tundun Matsara; Gidan Dan Nunu / Bakin Kasuwa
Zurmi	Zurmi	Maduba / Yar Kasuwa; Kadamutsa I / M. P. S. Kadamutsa; Kadamutsa II - M. P. S. Kadamutsa; Nasarawa I / M. P. S. Nasarawa; Nasarawa II / M. P. S. Nasarawa; Gidan Shaho / Garkar Sarkin Noma; Dada Shiyar Sabon Gari Zawayya Dada; Sh/Galadima / Yar Yara; Rimni / Yar Kofar; Marmaro / Pri. Sch.; Gidan Gadaje / Garkar Gadaje; Bakon Gebe / Yar Magasa; Majemawa I / J. N. I Zurmi; Majemawa II / J. N. I. Zurmi; Kofar Kuka / Yar Kofa; Katanga I / Isau M. P. S. Zurmi; Katanga II / Bakin Kotu; Shiyar Gora / Women Centre Zurmi; Shiyar Mamman / Town Dispensary Zurmi; Ali Bawa / Shiyar Ali Bawa; Awala Zumi/ Awala; Gididi/Garkar Ardo
