= Bagega =

Village in Zamfara State, Nigeria

- Village
- Location in Nigeria
- Coordinates: 11°51′54″N 6°00′10″E
- Country: Nigeria
- State: Zamfara
- LGA: Anka
- Time zone: UTC+1 (West Africa Time)

Bagega is an Hausa speaking village in northwestern Nigeria. The village became noteworthy during a 2021 campaign by international organizations to recognize lead poisoning of children in the area, as part of artisanal gold mining.

== Location ==
Bagega is located in the Anka Local Government Area of Zamfara State, Nigeria. Bagega is surrounded by Dorca, Maigelma and Tuduki.

== Economic activity ==
One of the major activities in Bagega is artisanal mining.

== Lead poisoning ==
The dangers of lead poisoning due to the artisanal mining in Bagega have drawn global attention and have been subject of several environmental research publications by organizations like United Nations Environment Programme, United Nations Office for the Coordination of Humanitarian Affairs, ReliefWeb, Médecins Sans Frontières, and Human Rights Watch.

In May 2012, Doctors Without Borders had reported that least 4,000 children were suffering from lead poisoning as a result of artisanal gold mining in Zamfara State in Nigeria. Later the same year, Human Rights Watch further called on the Nigerian government which had pledged close to US$5 million to clean up areas that had been contaminated with lead during artisanal gold mining operations because of high levels of lead in rock ore.

#SaveBagega was a viral campaign that started off on Twitter when Hamzat Lawal first used the hashtag when he tweeted about the lead poisoning incident in Bagega, Zamfara State. At the time of Human Right's Watch participation in #SaveBagega, more than 400 children were reported dead and many of the children could not be treated.

By January 2013, the campaign had reached some one million people, and dozens of media outlets had picked up on the story. At the end of that month, the federal government released the $5.3 million.

In April, 2013, Médecins Sans Frontières announced that the environmental cleaning of the earth in Bagega village had started and they had started chelation therapy on the children, which leaches the lead from the blood In May 2013, the then Nigerian Minister for Environment, Hadiza Mailafia announced that Bagega was safe for habitation after remediation.
