= Hamzat Lawal =

Nigerian social entrepreneur

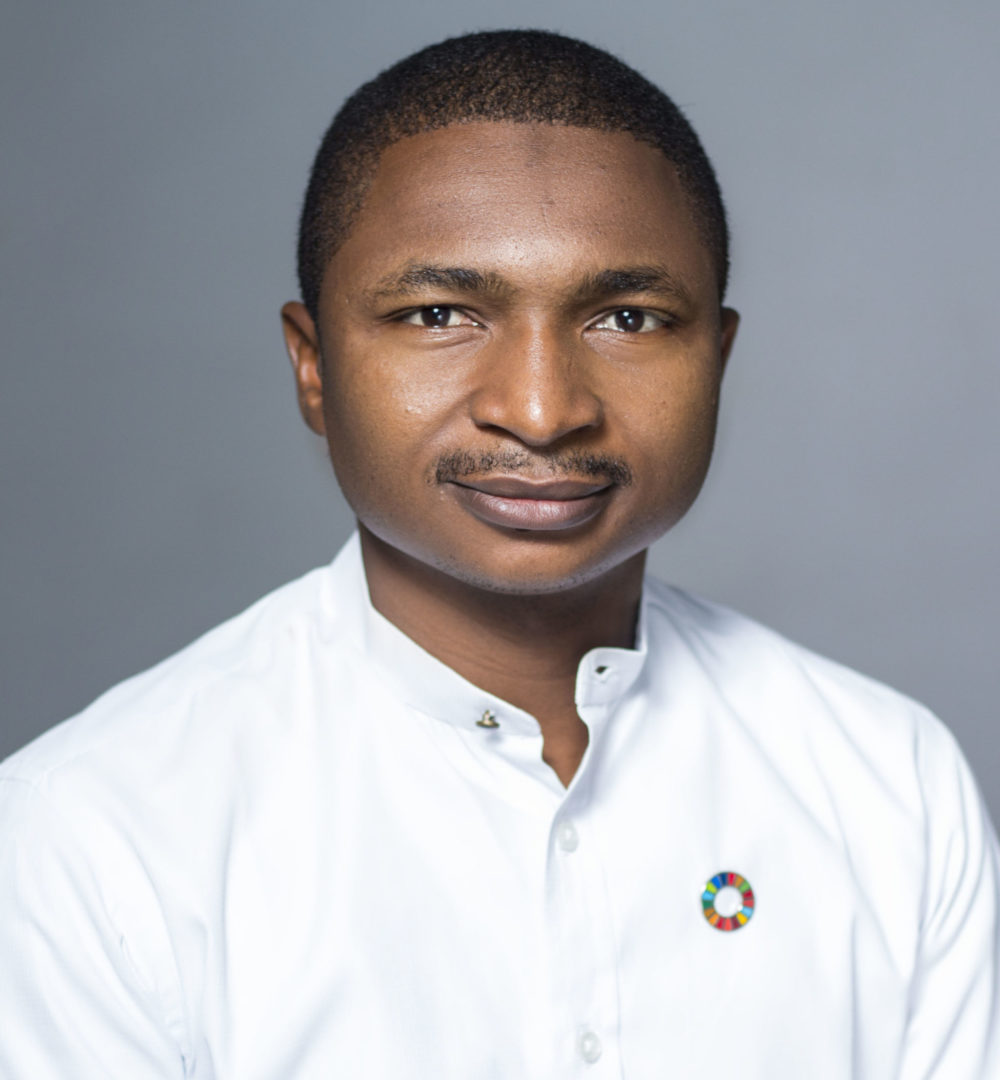
- Born: Hamzat Lawal; 1987 (age 38–39); Kogi State, Nigeria
- Education: University of Abuja
- Occupation: Activist
- Years active: 2012 — present
- Known for: Follow The Money
- Notable work: Founder of Follow The Money
- Website: www.hamzatlawal.com www.connecteddevelopment.org

Hamzat B. Lawal is an anti-corruption activist. He is the founder of Follow The Money, a social accountability initiative that comprises data analysts, journalists, activists, and students. Hamzat is also the Chief Executive of Connected Development (CODE), a non-governmental organization that is empowering marginalised communities in Africa with access to information on how to better engage their government for the implementation of public services.

== Biography ==
=== Early life and education ===
Lawal is a native of Kogi State. He attended the Model Primary School Asokoro in Abuja, and served as a Boys Scout leader. During his secondary school years, at Government Secondary School Karu in Nasarawa State, he served as the coordinator of Boys Scout and also as a Utility Prefect. He completed his secondary school at Seta International College, Nasarawa State.

Lawal is a graduate of the University of Abuja with a Bachelor's degree in Political Science.

=== Career ===
He has worked as a Rep Serviceman in an information technology firm. He later worked as an information technology specialist with International Centre for Energy, Environment and Development (ICEED) during which his passion for climate change grew. When his boss noticed the area of his passion, he gave him a United Nations Framework on Climate change website to research, and after going through documents and protocols, he developed more interest in that area. He later registered with many climate change platforms and participated in several activities.

In 2012, Lawal was grieved by the poisoning that took place in Zamfara state two years earlier. When he realized that nobody was talking about the disaster and the people affected after killing more than 400 people, he embarked on a 14 hours journey to the community, Bagega, where the incident took place, in order to learn more about the aftermath of the problem. This propelled him towards community activism and to start a grass-roots movement known as Follow The Money, using data to hold government accountable, and demanding action from government agencies.

In March 2021, Hamzat Lawal emerged as the Finalist for the $120,000 Gothenburg Sustainability Award.

Lawal is a co-convener of the Not Too Young To Run movement, a Nigerian Youth movement whose support for young people's right to run for political offices ensured that an age reduction bill was passed across the country promoting youth inclusion in Nigeria's politics. He is an executive board member of African Youth Initiative on Climate Change.

== Activism ==
Lawal started his activism while in University of Abuja. There after, he was responsible for advocating for good governance among the student and within the student community. He is constantly speaking out against corruption, human rights abuses and disfranchisement of young people and the general citizens. In 2013, he was almost arrested by Department of State Securities after he was accused of instigating youths against the then government.

== #SaveBagega ==
#SaveBagega was a viral campaign that started off on Twitter when Hamzat first used the hashtag when he tweeted about the lead poisoning incident in Bagega, Zamfara State. In May 2012, Doctors Without Borders had reported that least 4,000 children are suffering from lead poisoning as a result of artisanal gold mining in Zamfara State in Nigeria. Later the same year, Human Rights Watch further called on the Nigerian government who had pledged close to US$5 million to clean up areas that had been contaminated with lead during artisanal gold mining operations because of high levels of lead in rock ore. At the time of Human Right's Watch participation in #SaveBagega, more than 400 children were reported dead and many of the children could not be treated.

In January 2013, the campaign had reached some one million people, and dozens of media outlets had picked up on the story. At the end of that month, the federal government released the $5.3 million.

== Awards ==
- 2017: One Africa Award
- 2018: Apolical's 100 Most Influential in Digital Government
- 2018: African Economic Merit Award
- 2019: The Future Awards Africa (Advocacy category)
- 2019: United Nations Sustainable Development Goals Action Awards
- 2020: Global Education Champion, Malala Foundation
- 2021: BeyGOOD's Global Citizens Fellowship
- 2021: Council of Europe’s Democracy Innovation Awards
- 2021: Ten Outstanding Young Persons, Junior Chamber International Nigeria
- 2021: Honorary Ambassador to Israel
- 2021: Finalist for the WIN WIN Gothenburg Sustainability Award
