= 2023 Sokoto State gubernatorial election =

2023 gubernatorial election in Sokoto State, Nigeria

- 18 March 2023
- Registered: 2,172,056
Nominee	Ahmad Aliyu	Saidu Umar
Party	APC	PDP
Running mate	Idris Muhammad Gobir	Sagir Bafarawa
Popular vote	453,661	404,632
Percentage	52.48%	46.81%
Governor before election
Aminu Waziri Tambuwal
PDP
Elected Governor
Ahmad Aliyu
APC

The 2023 Sokoto State gubernatorial election was held on 18 March 2023, to elect the Governor of Sokoto State, concurrent with elections to the Sokoto State House of Assembly as well as twenty-seven other gubernatorial elections and elections to all other state houses of assembly. The election — which was postponed from its original 11 March date — was held three weeks after the presidential election and National Assembly elections. Incumbent PDP Governor Aminu Waziri Tambuwal was term-limited and could not seek re-election to a third term. Former Deputy Governor Ahmad Aliyu gained the office for the APC by a margin of ~6% over the PDP nominee — former Secretary to the State Government Saidu Umar.

Party primaries were scheduled for between 4 April and 9 June 2022 with the Peoples Democratic Party nominating Umar on 25 May while the All Progressives Congress nominated Aliyu on 26 May.

On 19 March, INEC declared Aliyu as the victor with official totals showing him winning about 454,000 votes (~52% of the vote) to defeat Umar with about 405,000 votes (~47% of the vote). Due to alleged irregularities, Umar rejected the results and filed a challenge at the electoral tribunal. The legal case eventually reached the Supreme Court, which upheld the election of Aliyu in a January 2024 judgment.

== Electoral system ==
The Governor of Sokoto State is elected using a modified two-round system. To be elected in the first round, a candidate must receive the plurality of the vote and over 25% of the vote in at least two-thirds of state local government areas. If no candidate passes this threshold, a second round will be held between the top candidate and the next candidate to have received a plurality of votes in the highest number of local government areas.

== Background ==
Sokoto State is a large northwestern state with agricultural and energy potential but facing a debilitated health sector, low education rates, and intense challenges in security as the nationwide kidnapping epidemic, bandit conflict, religious riots, and herder–farmer clashes have all heavily affected the state.

Politically, the 2019 elections were categorized as a swing back towards the PDP in the aftermath of Waziri Tambuwal's 2018 defection back to the party. Although Buhari won the state again, Sokoto was the state that swung the most towards the PDP in the presidential election; legislatively, the PDP held its one Senate seat after a court ruling and won four House of Representatives seats after the APC won all legislative seats in 2015. Statewise, Waziri Tambuwal won re-election by only about 300 votes while the APC won a narrow majority in the House of Assembly. During the term, APC dissenters worked with the PDP to form House of Assembly majority before eventually defecting and giving the PDP full control of the House.

Ahead of his term, Waziri Tambuwal's inauguration speech focused on education, healthcare, agriculture, water development, and transportation. In terms of his performance, Waziri Tambuwal was commended for improving girl-child and technical education while being criticized for baselessly denying National Bureau of Statistics poverty data, rapidly returning to out-of-state campaigning days after May 2022 religious riots, and rising insecurity.

== Primary elections ==
The primaries, along with any potential challenges to primary results, were to take place between 4 April and 3 June 2022 but the deadline was extended to 9 June. An informal zoning gentlemen's agreement sets the Sokoto East Senatorial District to have the next governor as Sokoto East has not held the governorship since 2007. However, no major party has closed their nomination to non-Easterners as of yet.

=== All Progressives Congress ===
The year prior to the APC primaries was beset by party infighting between three factions each supported by House of Representatives member Abdullahi Balarabe Salame, Minister Mohammed Maigari Dingyadi and former Governor Aliyu Magatakarda Wamakko, or former Senator and potential gubernatorial candidate Abubakar Umar Gada which culminated in three parallel party congresses in October 2021. The party crisis and legal battle over the congresses' legitimacy led no Sokoto APC chairman to be recognized in February 2022 alongside other state APC chairmen and for Sokoto delegates to be barred from the March APC National Convention. It was not until seven months after the congresses that a party executive was inaugurated after a court ruled in favor of the Maigari Dingyadi-Magatakarda Wamakko faction in late March and the leadership was sworn in on 29 March. The loss led House of Assembly Speaker Aminu Manya Achida (who had sided with Umar Gada's faction) to defect to the PDP; the protracted party crisis along with more potential defections have the potential to hurt the APC in the general election.

On 20 April 2022, the APC National Executive Committee announced the party's schedule for gubernatorial primaries, setting its expression of interest form price at ₦10 million and nomination form price at ₦40 million with a 50% nomination form discount for candidates younger than 40 while women and candidates with disabilities get free nomination forms. Forms were to be sold from 26 April to 6 May until the deadline was later extended to 10 May then 12 May. After the submission of nomination forms by 13 May, candidates were screened by a party committee on 14 and 15 May while 16 May was the date for the screening appeal process. Ward congresses and LGA congresses were set for between 7 and 9 May to elect delegates for the primary. Candidates approved by the screening process advanced to a primary set for 26 May, in concurrence with other APC gubernatorial primaries; challenges to the result could be made the next day.

In the days before the primary, disputes emerged over the delegate list as now-candidate Balarabe Salame accused three local government party organizations of selecting delegates without a congress. On primary day, Balarabe Salame and former Senator Abubakar Umar Gada withdrew in protest of the process and three other candidates staged a walkout as several delegates claimed that unknown people were impersonating other delegates. Voting continued into the morning of 27 May and ended in the nomination of Ahmad Aliyu—a former Deputy Governor and the party's 2019 nominee—by a wide margin. Aliyu called for party unity in his acceptance speech and thanked party national chairman Abdullahi Adamu. However, about a month after the primary, the trio of Balarabe Salame, Yusuf Sulaiman, and Abubakar Abdullahi Gumbi defected to the PDP. A few weeks later, former commissioner Idris Muhammad Gobir was announced as Aliyu's running mate.

==== Nominated ====
- Ahmad Aliyu: former Nigeria Police Trust Fund Executive Secretary (2020–2022), 2019 APC gubernatorial nominee, and former Deputy Governor (2015–2018)
  - Running mate—Idris Muhammad Gobir: former Commissioner for Budget and Economic Planning and former Sabon Birni Sole Administrator

==== Eliminated in primary ====
- Abubakar Abdullahi Gumbi: retired civil servant (defected after the primary to the PDP)
- Abdullahi Ibrahim Gobir: Senator for Sokoto East (2011–present)
- Faruk Malami Yabo: Ambassador to Jordan (2021–present), 2019 APC gubernatorial candidate and deputy gubernatorial nominee, former Commissioner of Local Government and Community Development (2012–2015), and former Commissioner of Finance (2007–2012)
- Yusuf Sulaiman: former Minister of Transport (2011) and former Minister of Sports (2011) (defected after the primary to the PDP)

==== Withdrew ====
- Abdullahi Balarabe Salame: House of Representatives member for Gwadabawa/Illela (2011–present), former House of Assembly member for Gwadabawa East (2007–2011), former Speaker of the House of Assembly (2007–2011), and former Acting Governor (2008) (defected after the primary to the PDP)
- Abubakar Umar Gada: former Senator for Sokoto East (2007–2011)

==== Declined ====
- Ibrahim Abdullahi Danbaba: Senator for Sokoto South (2015–2019; 2019–present) and former Deputy Governor (1999–2003)
- Mas'ud Musa Bashar: businessman
- Abubakar Shehu Tambuwal: former Senator for Sokoto South (2019)

==== Results ====
Candidates' vote share
1. Ahmad Aliyu (93.1%)
2. Other candidates (6.90%)

APC primary results
Party	Candidate	Votes	%
APC	Ahmad Aliyu	1,080	93.10%
APC	Abdullahi Ibrahim Gobir	36	3.10%
APC	Faruk Malami Yabo	27	2.33%
APC	Yusuf Sulaiman	16	1.38%
APC	Abubakar Abdullahi Gumbi	1	0.09%
APC	Abdullahi Balarabe Salame (withdrawn)	0	0.00%
APC	Abubakar Umar Gada (withdrawn)	0	0.00%
Total votes		1,160	100.00%
Invalid or blank votes		23	N/A
Turnout		1,182	Unknown

=== People's Democratic Party ===
On 16 March 2022, the national PDP announced its gubernatorial primaries' schedule, setting its expression of interest form price at ₦1 million and the nomination form price at ₦20 million with a 50% discount for candidates between 25 and 30. Forms were to be sold until 1 April but the party later extended the deadline four times before reaching a final deadline of 22 April. After the submission of nomination forms by 25 April, candidates were screened by a party committee on 28 April while 2 May was the rescheduled date for the screening appeal process. Ward congresses were set for 29 April and LGA congresses were rescheduled for 10 May to elect delegates for the primary. Candidates approved by the screening process advanced to a primary set for 25 May, in concurrence with all other PDP gubernatorial primaries; challenges to the result could be made in the following days.

On the primary date, every candidates except former Secretary to the State Government Saidu Umar withdrew from the race to support Umar's emergence as the consensus nominee. The nomination of Umar via consensus was confirmed later that day, with Waziri Tambuwal claiming that it was a positive step for party unity along with announcing that withdrawn candidates like Manir Dan Iya and Sagir Bafarawa would receive other nominations in exchange for their withdrawals. However, former candidate Muktar Shagari left the PDP in protest of the Umar's nomination. By July, Dan Iya had obtained the Sokoto North PDP senatorial nomination while Umar had picked Bafarawa as his running mate.

==== Nominated ====
- Saidu Umar: former Secretary to the State Government (2019–2022) and former Commissioner of Finance (2015–2019)
  - Running mate—Sagir Bafarawa: former Commissioner of Environment (2019–2022) and son of former Governor Attahiru Bafarawa

==== Withdrew ====
- Mohammed Bello Aliyu Goronyo: state PDP Chairman and former commissioner
- Sagir Bafarawa: former Commissioner of Environment (2019–2022) and son of former Governor Attahiru Bafarawa
- Umar Bature: PDP National Organizing Secretary (2021–present), former commissioner, and former House of Representatives member for Sokoto North/Sokoto South
- Manir Dan Iya: Deputy Governor (2018–present) and former Commissioner of Local Government and Chieftaincy Affairs (2015–2018; 2019–2022)
- Muktar Shagari: former Deputy Governor (2007–2015), former Minister of Water Resources (2001–2007), and nephew of former President Shehu Shagari

==== Declined ====
- Umar Isa Ajiya: Nigerian National Petroleum Corporation official and in-law of former Governor Attahiru Bafarawa
- Abdussamad Dasuki: former Commissioner of Finance (2019–2022), former House of Representatives member for Kebbe/Tambuwal (2015–2019), and former House of Assembly member for Tambuwal East (2011–2015)
- Garba Ila Gada: 2012 DPP gubernatorial nominee, former Senator for Sokoto North (1992–1993), and former Commissioner of Economic Planning
- Ahmad Muhammad Gusau: former Deputy Governor

==== Results ====
PDP primary results
Party	Candidate	Votes	%
PDP	Saidu Umar	695	100.00%
Total votes		695	100.00%
Invalid or blank votes		60	N/A
Turnout		755	Unknown

=== Minor parties ===
- Ahmad Jao Ahmad (Action Alliance)
  - Running mate: Umar Abdullahi
- Ibrahim Muhammad Liman (Action Democratic Party)
  - Running mate: Aliyu Hussaini Muawuya
- Sidi Ahmed Abba (Action Peoples Party)
  - Running mate: Hannatu Mukhtar
- Ahmad Babajo Ibrahim (African Action Congress)
  - Running mate: Murtala Sani
- Bello Isiyaku (African Democratic Congress)
  - Running mate: Zakari Halilu Gobir
- Haruna Abubakar (Allied Peoples Movement)
  - Running mate: Hauwa'u Bello
- Ibrahim Muhammed Mansur Gada (All Progressives Grand Alliance)
  - Running mate: Bello Wadata
- Ibrahim Goronyo (Boot Party)
  - Running mate: Zayyanu Sahabi
- Aminu Ahmad Umar (Labour Party)
  - Running mate: Hamisu Isah
- Umaru Dahiru (New Nigeria Peoples Party)
  - Running mate: Ibrahim Ango
- Sulaiman Dandauda Aliyu (National Rescue Movement)
  - Running mate: Mohammad Basheer Tanimu
- Muhammad Saidu Gumburawa (People's Redemption Party)
  - Running mate: Ismaila Na'Allah
- Abubakar Umar Gada (Social Democratic Party)
  - Running mate: Kabir Umar Dansuki
- Usama Sani Daniya (Young Progressives Party)
  - Running mate: Bello Ibrahim
- Habibu Mohammed (Zenith Labour Party)
  - Running mate: Mohammed Ibrahim

== Campaign ==
Immediately after the primaries, pundits focused on the fallout from the elections and alleged imposition of nominees. As the general election campaign began in mid-2022, observers noted the potential impact of divisions within the state and national PDP on Umar's campaign due to significant disputes between Tambuwal and other major PDP figures. However, pundits also said most unsuccessful PDP gubernatorial aspirants had been successfully placated while the APC primary led to lingering resentment against former Governor Aliyu Magatakarda Wamakko—who was accused of imposing Aliyu as nominee. On the other hand, analysis in September noted that there had been notable defections from both major parties along with a report that Deputy Governor and former PDP gubernatorial candidate Manir Dan Iya could join the APC. After the start of the official campaign period in October, APC and PDP began public attack statements; it began with the APC accusing the PDP of threatening businessmen, traditional leaders, and religious Leaders to force them to support PDP candidates. In response, the PDP denied the accusations while stating that Wamakko had disrespected traditional leaders during his term as governor.

In late November, analysis from The Nation mentioned the competitiveness of the race while reiterating the potential damage from divides within each major party. Observers also noted similarities between the APC and PDP tickets in terms of regional balance and godfather support. Similarly, reporting from the Premium Times from the next month focused on Wamakko's influence on the state APC in opposition to his longtime rival Attahiru Bafarawa's influence on the state PDP. Meanwhile, an election overview from the Daily Trust contended that Umar could be hurt by Tambuwal's position in the campaign of PDP presidential nominee Atiku Abubakar. The January piece also cast doubts on the viability of other candidates like Aminu Ahmad Umar (LP) or Umaru Dahiru (NNPP). Later that month, ThisDay reporting confirmed that the APC had not formally commenced its campaign or formed a campaign council with the election only a month away. However, both major candidates were campaigning extensively; tension rose entering February due to a rise on political violence, including attacks on the convoys of both major candidates.

Later in February, attention largely switched to the nearing presidential election on 25 February. In the election, Sokoto State narrowly voted for Atiku Abubakar (PDP); Abubakar won the state with 49.2% of the vote, beating Bola Tinubu's 48.6%. Aside from the presidential result, the legislative elections were also very close and mainly inconcisive. These results led analysts to focus on the state's competitiveness.

== Projections ==
Source	Projection	As of
Africa Elects (Note: AfricaElects projections predict the likelihood of a candidate winning a state by categorizing a state as "Safe" for exceedingly likely, "Likely" for somewhat likely, and "Lean" for least likely. If no clear determination could be made, states are categorized as "tossups".)	Lean Umar	17 March 2023
Enough is Enough- SBM Intelligence (Note: EiE-SBM projections predict which candidates will win states.)	Umar	2 March 2023

== Conduct ==
=== Electoral timetable ===
On 26 February 2022, the Independent National Electoral Commission released the timetable, setting out key dates and deadlines for the election. Months later on 27 May 2022, INEC made a slight revision to the timetable, allowing parties extra time to conduct primaries.

- 28 February 2022 – Publication of Notice of Election
- 4 April 2022 – First day for the conduct of party primaries
- 9 June 2022 (Note: The original deadline was 3 June; however, INEC pushed it back to 9 June at the behest of parties.) – Final day for the conduct of party primaries, including the resolution of disputes arising from them
- 1 July 2022 – First day for submission of nomination forms to INEC via the online portal
- 15 July 2022 – Final day for submission of nomination forms to INEC via the online portal
- 12 October 2022 – Commencement of the official campaign period
- 16 March 2023 (Note: The original deadline was 9 March; however, INEC pushed it back to 16 March.) – Final day of the official campaign period

== General election ==
=== Results ===
2023 Sokoto State gubernatorial election
Party	Candidate	Votes	%
AA	Ahmad Jao Ahmad		
ADP	Ibrahim Muhammad Liman		
APP	Sidi Ahmed Abba		
AAC	Ahmad Babajo Ibrahim		
ADC	Bello Isiyaku		
APM	Haruna Abubakar		
APC	Ahmad Aliyu		
APGA	Ibrahim Muhammed Mansur Gada		
BP	Ibrahim Goronyo		
LP	Aminu Ahmad Umar		
New Nigeria Peoples Party	Umaru Dahiru		
NRM	Sulaiman Dandauda Aliyu		
PDP	Saidu Umar		
PRP	Muhammad Saidu Gumburawa		
SDP	Abubakar Umar Gada		
YPP	Usama Sani Daniya		
ZLP	Habibu Mohammed		
Total votes			100.00%
Invalid or blank votes			N/A
Turnout			

==== By senatorial district ====
The results of the election by senatorial district.

Senatorial District	Ahmad Aliyu APC		Saidu Umar PDP		Others		Total Valid Votes
Senatorial District	Votes	Percentage	Votes	Percentage	Votes	Percentage	Total Valid Votes
Sokoto East Senatorial District (Note: Comprising the local government areas of Gada, Goronyo, Gwadabawa, Illela, Isa, Rabah, Sabon Birni, and Wurno.)	TBD	%	TBD	%	TBD	%	TBD
Sokoto North Senatorial District (Note: Comprising the local government areas of Binji, Gudu, Kware, Silame, Sokoto North, Sokoto South, Tangaza, and Wamako.)	TBD	%	TBD	%	TBD	%	TBD
Sokoto South Senatorial District (Note: Comprising the local government areas of Bodinga, Dange Shuni, Kebbe, Shagari, Tambuwal, Tureta, and Yabo.)	TBD	%	TBD	%	TBD	%	TBD
Totals	TBD	%	TBD	%	TBD	%	TBD

==== By federal constituency ====
The results of the election by federal constituency.

Federal Constituency	Ahmad Aliyu APC		Saidu Umar PDP		Others		Total Valid Votes
Federal Constituency	Votes	Percentage	Votes	Percentage	Votes	Percentage	Total Valid Votes
Binji/Silame Federal Constituency (Note: Comprising the local government areas of Binji and Silame.)	TBD	%	TBD	%	TBD	%	TBD
Dange-Shuni/Bodinga/Tureta Federal Constituency (Note: Comprising the local government areas of Bodinga, Dange Shuni, and Tureta.)	TBD	%	TBD	%	TBD	%	TBD
Goronyo/Gada Federal Constituency (Note: Comprising the local government areas of Gada and Goronyo.)	TBD	%	TBD	%	TBD	%	TBD
Illela/Gwadabawa Federal Constituency (Note: Comprising the local government areas of Gwadabawa and Illela.)	TBD	%	TBD	%	TBD	%	TBD
Isa/Sabon Birni Federal Constituency (Note: Comprising the local government areas of Isa and Sabon Birni.)	TBD	%	TBD	%	TBD	%	TBD
Kebbe/Tambuwal Federal Constituency (Note: Comprising the local government areas of Kebbe and Tambuwal.)	TBD	%	TBD	%	TBD	%	TBD
Kware/Wamakko Federal Constituency (Note: Comprising the local government areas of Kware and Wamako.)	TBD	%	TBD	%	TBD	%	TBD
Sokoto North/Sokoto South Federal Constituency (Note: Comprising the local government areas of Sokoto North and Sokoto South.)	TBD	%	TBD	%	TBD	%	TBD
Tangaza/Gudu Federal Constituency (Note: Comprising the local government areas of Gudu and Tangaza.)	TBD	%	TBD	%	TBD	%	TBD
Wurno/Rabah Federal Constituency (Note: Comprising the local government areas of Rabah and Wurno.)	TBD	%	TBD	%	TBD	%	TBD
Yabo/Shagari Federal Constituency (Note: Comprising the local government areas of Shagari and Yabo.)	TBD	%	TBD	%	TBD	%	TBD
Totals	TBD	%	TBD	%	TBD	%	TBD

==== By local government area ====
The results of the election by local government area.

LGA	Ahmad Aliyu APC		Saidu Umar PDP		Others		Total Valid Votes	Turnout Percentage
LGA	Votes	Percentage	Votes	Percentage	Votes	Percentage	Total Valid Votes	Turnout Percentage
Binji	TBD	%	TBD	%	TBD	%	TBD	%
Bodinga	TBD	%	TBD	%	TBD	%	TBD	%
Dange Shuni	TBD	%	TBD	%	TBD	%	TBD	%
Gada	TBD	%	TBD	%	TBD	%	TBD	%
Goronyo	TBD	%	TBD	%	TBD	%	TBD	%
Gudu	TBD	%	TBD	%	TBD	%	TBD	%
Gwadabawa	TBD	%	TBD	%	TBD	%	TBD	%
Illela	TBD	%	TBD	%	TBD	%	TBD	%
Isa	TBD	%	TBD	%	TBD	%	TBD	%
Kebbe	TBD	%	TBD	%	TBD	%	TBD	%
Kware	TBD	%	TBD	%	TBD	%	TBD	%
Rabah	TBD	%	TBD	%	TBD	%	TBD	%
Sabon Birni	TBD	%	TBD	%	TBD	%	TBD	%
Shagari	TBD	%	TBD	%	TBD	%	TBD	%
Silame	TBD	%	TBD	%	TBD	%	TBD	%
Sokoto North	TBD	%	TBD	%	TBD	%	TBD	%
Sokoto South	TBD	%	TBD	%	TBD	%	TBD	%
Tambuwal	TBD	%	TBD	%	TBD	%	TBD	%
Tangaza	TBD	%	TBD	%	TBD	%	TBD	%
Tureta	TBD	%	TBD	%	TBD	%	TBD	%
Wamako	TBD	%	TBD	%	TBD	%	TBD	%
Wurno	TBD	%	TBD	%	TBD	%	TBD	%
Yabo	TBD	%	TBD	%	TBD	%	TBD	%
Totals	TBD	%	TBD	%	TBD	%	TBD	%

== See also ==
- 2023 Nigerian elections
- 2023 Nigerian gubernatorial elections
