= 2007 Sokoto State gubernatorial election =

2007 gubernatorial election in Sokoto State, Nigeria

- April 14, 2007
Nominee	Aliyu Magatakarda Wamakko	Muhammed Dingyadi
Party	PDP	DPP
Running mate	Muktar Shagari
Popular vote	392,258	296,419
Governor before election
Attahiru Bafarawa
ANPP
Elected Governor
Aliyu Magatakarda Wamakko
PDP

The 2007 Sokoto State gubernatorial election occurred on April 14, 2007. PDP candidate Aliyu Magatakarda Wamakko won the election, defeating DPP Muhammed Dingyadi and 8 other candidates.

== Results ==
Aliyu Magatakarda Wamakko from the PDP won the election. He defeated Muhammed Dingyadi of the DPP and 8 others.

The total number of registered voters in the state was 1,109,337.

- Aliyu Magatakarda Wamakko, (PDP)- 392,258
- Muhammed Dingyadi, DPP- 296,419
- Abubakar Chika Sarkin Yaki, ANPP- 32,152
- Umar Bello, AC- 9,706
- Abdullahi Umar Farouk, APGA- 8,283
- Aminu Salahtauma, CPP- 7,931
- Abubakar Garba, ADC- 6,065
- Bello Ibrahim Gusau, PPA- 5,931
- Abdulwahab Yahaya Goronyo, UNDP- 3,572
- Ahamed Bello Ahmed, AD- 3,365
