= 1999 Sokoto State gubernatorial election =

1999 gubernatorial election in Sokoto State, Nigeria

- January 9, 1999
Nominee	Attahiru Bafarawa	Muhammadu Modi Yabo
Party	All People's Party (Nigeria)	PDP
Running mate	Aliyu Magatakarda Wamakko	Abdullahi Aminu Tafida
Popular vote	249,205	182,655
Governor before election
Yahaya Abdulkarim
NRC
Elected Governor
Attahiru Bafarawa
All People's Party (Nigeria)

The 1999 Sokoto State gubernatorial election occurred on January 9, 1999. APP candidate Attahiru Bafarawa won the election, defeating PDP candidate Muhammadu Modi Yabo.

== Results ==
Attahiru Bafarawa from the APP won the election. PDP candidate Muhammadu Modi Yabo and AD candidate contested in the election.

The total number of registered voters in the state was 1,248,311, total votes cast was 462,595, valid votes was 436,738 and rejected votes was 25,857.

- Umaru Musa Yar'Adua, (APP)- 249,205
- Muhammadu Modi Yabo, PDP- 182,655
- AD- 4,878
