= 2008 Sokoto State gubernatorial by-election =

2008 gubernatorial by-election in Sokoto State, Nigeria

- May 24, 2008
Nominee	Aliyu Magatakarda Wamakko	Muhammed Dingyadi
Party	PDP	DPP
Running mate	Muktar Shagari
Popular vote	562,395	124,046
Governor before election
Aliyu Magatakarda Wamakko
PDP
Elected Governor
Aliyu Magatakarda Wamakko
PDP

The 2008 Sokoto State gubernatorial by-election occurred on May 24, 2008. PDP candidate Aliyu Magatakarda Wamakko won the election, defeating DPP Muhammed Dingyadi and other candidates.

== Results ==
Aliyu Magatakarda Wamakko from the PDP won the election. He defeated Muhammed Dingyadi of the DPP and several others.

The total number of votes cast was 785,682, valid votes was 698,362 and rejected votes was 87,320.

- Aliyu Magatakarda Wamakko, (PDP)- 562,395
- Muhammed Dingyadi, DPP- 124,046
- CPP- 6,286
- ANPP- 1,842
- PPA- 1,658
