= 2007 Nigerian Senate elections in Sokoto State =

2007 Nigerian Senate election in Sokoto State

The 2007 Nigerian Senate election in Sokoto State was held on April 21, 2007, to elect members of the Nigerian Senate to represent Sokoto State. Umaru Dahiru representing Sokoto South, Ahmed Muhammad Maccido representing Sokoto North and Abubakar Umar Gada representing Sokoto East all won on the platform of the Peoples Democratic Party.

== Overview ==
Affiliation	Party		Total
Affiliation	PDP	AC	Total
Before Election			3
After Election	3	0	3

== Summary ==
District	Incumbent	Party	Elected Senator	Party
Sokoto South			Umaru Dahiru	PDP
Sokoto North			Ahmed Muhammad Maccido	PDP
Sokoto East			Abubakar Umar Gada	PDP

== Results ==
=== Sokoto South ===
The election was won by Umaru Dahiru of the Peoples Democratic Party.

2007 Nigerian Senate election in Sokoto State
Party	Candidate	Votes	%
PDP	Umaru Dahiru		
Total votes			
PDP hold			

=== Sokoto North ===
The election was won by Ahmed Muhammad Maccido of the Peoples Democratic Party.

2007 Nigerian Senate election in Sokoto State
Party	Candidate	Votes	%
PDP	Ahmed Muhammad Maccido		
Total votes			
PDP hold			

=== Sokoto East ===
The election was won by Abubakar Umar Gada of the Peoples Democratic Party.

2007 Nigerian Senate election in Sokoto State
Party	Candidate	Votes	%
PDP	Abubakar Umar Gada		
Total votes			
PDP hold			
