= 2015 Nigerian Senate elections in Sokoto State =

2015 Nigerian Senate election in Sokoto State

The 2015 Nigerian Senate election in Sokoto State was held on March 28, 2015, to elect members of the Nigerian Senate to represent Sokoto State. Abdullahi Ibrahim Gobir representing Sokoto East, Aliyu Magatakarda Wamakko representing Sokoto North and Ibrahim Abdullahi Danbaba representing Sokoto South all won on the platform of All Progressives Congress.

== Overview ==
Affiliation	Party		Total
Affiliation	APC	PDP	Total
Before Election			3
After Election	3	–	3

== Summary ==
District	Incumbent	Party	Elected Senator	Party
Sokoto East			Abdullahi Ibrahim Gobir	APC
Sokoto North			Aliyu Magatakarda Wamakko	APC
Sokoto South			Ibrahim Abdullahi Danbaba	APC

== Results ==
=== Sokoto East ===
All Progressives Congress candidate Abdullahi Ibrahim Gobir won the election, defeating People's Democratic Party candidate Dahiru Yari and other party candidates.

2015 Nigerian Senate election in Sokoto State
Party	Candidate	Votes	%
APC	Abdullahi Ibrahim Gobir		
PDP	Dahiru Yari		
Total votes			
APC hold			

=== Sokoto North ===
All Progressives Congress candidate Aliyu Magatakarda Wamakko won the election, defeating People's Democratic Party candidate Ahmed Muhammad Maccido and other party candidates.

2015 Nigerian Senate election in Sokoto State
Party	Candidate	Votes	%
APC	Aliyu Magatakarda Wamakko		
PDP	Ahmed Muhammad Maccido		
Total votes			
APC hold			

=== Sokoto South ===
All Progressives Congress candidate Ibrahim Abdullahi Danbaba won the election, defeating People's Democratic Party candidate Abdullahi Muhammad and other party candidates.

2015 Nigerian Senate election in Sokoto State
Party	Candidate	Votes	%
APC	Ibrahim Abdullahi Danbaba		
PDP	Abdullahi Muhammad		
Total votes			
APC hold			
