= 2012 Sokoto State gubernatorial election =

2012 gubernatorial election in Sokoto State, Nigeria

- February 18, 2012
| Nominee | Aliyu Magatakarda Wamakko | Yusha'u Ahmed |
| Party | PDP | ANPP |
| Running mate | Muktar Shagari |
| Popular vote | 518,247 | 131,048 |
Governor before election
Aliyu Magatakarda Wamakko
PDP
Elected Governor
Aliyu Magatakarda Wamakko
PDP

The 2012 Sokoto State gubernatorial election occurred on February 18, 2012. PDP candidate Aliyu Magatakarda Wamakko won the election, defeating ANPP Yusha'u Ahmed and 28 other candidates.

Yusha'u Ahmed was ANPP candidate, Abubakar Yabo was CPC candidate.

== PDP primary ==
Aliyu Magatakarda Wamakko emerged PDP's candidate in the primary election, scoring 956 votes and defeating his two rivals Abubakar Gada and Yusuf Suleiman who polled no votes. He chose Muktar Shagari as his running mate.

== Results ==
Aliyu Magatakarda Wamakko from the PDP won the election defeating other 29 candidates. The total number of registered voters in the state was 2,453,857, total votes cast was 728,108, valid votes was 684,490 and rejected votes was 43,618.

- Aliyu Magatakarda Wamakko, (PDP)- 518,247.
- Yusha'u Ahmed, ANPP- 131,048.
- Abubakar Yabo, CPC- 7,323
- Illa Gada, DPP- 4,056
