= 2011 Nigerian Senate elections in Sokoto State =

2011 Nigerian Senate election in Sokoto State

The 2011 Nigerian Senate election in Sokoto State was held on April 9, 2011, to elect members of the Nigerian Senate to represent Sokoto State. Abdullahi Ibrahim Gobir representing Sokoto East, Ahmed Muhammad Maccido representing Sokoto North and Umaru Dahiru representing Sokoto South all won on the platform of Peoples Democratic Party.

== Overview ==
Affiliation	Party		Total
Affiliation	PDP	ACN	Total
Before Election			3
After Election	3	–	3

== Summary ==
District	Incumbent	Party	Elected Senator	Party
Sokoto East			Abdullahi Ibrahim Gobir	PDP
Sokoto North			Ahmed Muhammad Maccido	PDP
Sokoto South			Umaru Dahiru	PDP

== Results ==
=== Sokoto East ===
Peoples Democratic Party candidate Abdullahi Ibrahim Gobir won the election, defeating other party candidates.

2011 Nigerian Senate election in Sokoto State
Party	Candidate	Votes	%
PDP	Abdullahi Ibrahim Gobir		
Total votes			
PDP hold			

=== Sokoto North ===
Peoples Democratic Party candidate Ahmed Muhammad Maccido won the election, defeating other party candidates.

2011 Nigerian Senate election in Sokoto State
Party	Candidate	Votes	%
PDP	Ahmed Muhammad Maccido		
Total votes			
PDP hold			

=== Sokoto South ===
Peoples Democratic Party candidate Umaru Dahiru won the election, defeating party candidates.

2011 Nigerian Senate election in Sokoto State
Party	Candidate	Votes	%
PDP	Umaru Dahiru		
Total votes			
PDP hold			
