= 2019 Nigerian House of Representatives elections in Sokoto State =

The 2019 Nigerian House of Representatives elections in Sokoto State was held on February 23, 2019, to elect members of the House of Representatives to represent Sokoto State, Nigeria.

== Overview ==
Affiliation	Party		Total
Affiliation	APC	PDP	Total
Before Election	11	0	11
After Election	9	2	11

== Summary ==
District	Incumbent	Party	Elected Rep	Party
Binji/Silame	Saadu M Nabunkari	APC	Mani Maishinko	PDP
Dange-Shuni/Bodinga/Tureta	Shehu Aliyu	APC	Shehu Aliyu	APC
Goronyo/Gada	Musa Kaffe	APC	Musa Kaffe	APC
Illela/Gwadabawa	Abdullahi Salame	APC	Abdullahi Salame	APC
Isa/Sabon Birni	Aminu Sani Isa	APC	Mohammed Bargaja	PDP
Kebbe/Tambuwal	Abdussamad Dasuki	APC	Bala Kokani	APC
Kware/Wamakko	Abdullahi Kalambaina	APC	Abdullahi Kalambaina	APC
Sokoto North/Sokoto South	Hassan Abubakar III	APC	Hassan Abubakar III	APC
Tangaza/Gudu	Isa Salihu	APC	Yusuf Kurdula	APC
Wurno/Rabah	Kabiru Marafa Achida	APC	Aliyu Almustapha	APC
Yabo/Shagari	Aminu Shehu Shagari	APC	Abubakar Yabo	APC
