= November 2021 Sokoto State massacre =

In November 2021, a massacre occurred in Sokoto, Nigeria, supposedly by gunmen, locally known as 'bandits'. At least 40 were killed in all, with countless homes set on fire by bandits. Sokoto had been seeing numerous waves of attacks during that time period.
