= Aminu Tambuwal =

Nigerian politician and lawyer (born 1966)

Rt. Hon. Aminu Tambuwal
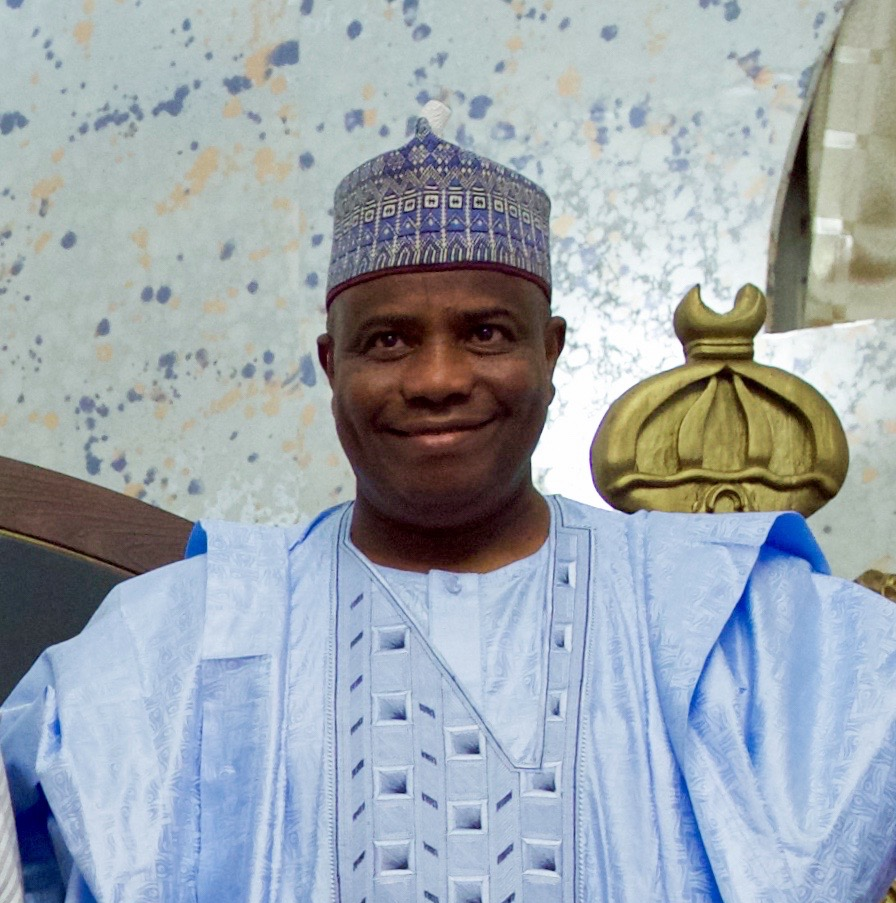

Senator for Sokoto South
- Incumbent
- Assumed office 13 June 2023
- Preceded by: Ibrahim Abdullahi Danbaba

Governor of Sokoto State
- In office 29 May 2015 – 29 May 2023
- Deputy: Ahmad Aliyu (2015–2018); Manir Dan Iya (2018–2023)
- Preceded by: Aliyu Magatakarda Wamakko
- Succeeded by: Ahmad Aliyu

12th Speaker of the House of Representatives of Nigeria
- In office 6 June 2011 – 29 May 2015
- Deputy: Chukwuemeka Ihedioha
- Preceded by: Dimeji Bankole
- Succeeded by: Yakubu Dogara

House Deputy Chief Whip
- In office 5 June 2007 – 6 June 2011

Member of the House of Representatives of Nigeria from Sokoto
- In office 3 June 2003 – 29 May 2015
- Preceded by: Hon. Sanyinna Aliyu Umar
- Succeeded by: Hon. Abdussamad Dasuki
- Constituency: Tambuwal/Kebbe

Personal details
- Born: 10 January 1966 (age 60) Tambuwal, Northern Region, Nigeria (now in Sokoto State)
- Party: African Democratic Congress (2026–present)
- Other political affiliations: All Nigeria Peoples Party (2003–2007); Peoples Democratic Party (2007–2014); Peoples Democratic Party (2014–2018); Peoples Democratic Party (2018–2026)
- Spouse(s): Mariya Aminu Waziri; Maryam Mairo Mustapha
- Education: Usman Danfodio University (LL.B.)
- Occupation: Politician; lawyer

Aminu Tambuwal (Full name: Aminu Waziri Tambuwal; born 10 January 1966) is a Nigerian lawyer and politician. A member of the Peoples Democratic Party, he represented the Tambuwal/Kebbe Federal Constituency of Sokoto State in the House of Representatives from 2003 to 2015, including serving as the twelfth Speaker of the House of Representatives of Nigeria from 2011 to 2015.

He was the governor of Sokoto State from 2015 to 2023 and has served as senator for Sokoto South since 2023.

== Birth and education ==
Aminu Waziri Tambuwal was born to Fatima and Waziri Tambuwal on 10 January 1966 in Tambuwal village in Sokoto State.

He attended Tambuwal Primary School in Tambuwal, obtained his First School Leaving Certificate in 1979, and then went on to the Government Teachers' College in Dogon-Daji where he obtained a Teachers Grade II Certificate in 1984. Tambuwal then studied law at Usman Dan Fodio University in Sokoto where he graduated in 1991 with an LLB (Hons) degree. He completed his one-year compulsory legal studies at the Nigerian Law School, Lagos, obtained his BL, and was called to the Bar in 1992.

Tambuwal attended several courses abroad, including "Telecoms Regulatory Master Class" in Bath, UK in 2004; "Lawmaking for the Communications Sectors" at BMIT in Johannesburg, South Africa in 2004; "Regulating a Competitive Industry-UK" in Brussels in 2005; "International Legislative Drafting" at Tulane University in 2005; "Influence and Negotiation" at Stanford Graduate School of Business in 2008; and "Infrastructure in Market Economy" at KSG Harvard, also in 2008.

== Political career ==
Tambuwal was first introduced to the political system while working from 1999 to 2000 as a personal assistant on legislative affairs to the then Senate leader, Senator Abdullahi Wali.

=== House of Representatives ===
In 2003 Tambuwal stood as a representative of the Kebbe/Tambuwal Federal Constituency and was elected into the House of Representatives on the platform of the All Nigeria Peoples Party (ANPP). A few months before the 2007 general elections he defected to the Democratic Peoples Party (DPP) alongside the former governor of Sokoto State, Attahiru Bafarawa. However, when the DPP denied return tickets to former ANPP legislators Tambuwal swung back to the ANPP, where he eventually succeeded in picking up a ticket for the election. But Tambuwal later left the ANPP for the PDP, following the ANPP governorship candidate for Sokoto State in the 2007 election, Alhaji Aliyu Wamakko, who did the same.

Tambuwal held several offices in the House. In 2005 he became the minority leader of the House until he defected to the PDP in 2007. Upon his re-election to the House in 2007 he was also elected the deputy chief whip. He was also a member of several committees, including the House Committees on: Rules & Business; Communications; Judiciary; Inter-Parliamentary; and Water Resources. He was also a member of the ad hoc House Committee on Constitution Review. He was also chairman of the ad hoc committee that reviewed the report of the controverPower Probe Committee, headed by Ndudi Elumelu, who was chairman of the House Sub-Committee on the Bill for an Act to Amend the Land Use Act, and acting chairman of the House Committee on Power.

Tambuwal was leader of the Nigerian delegation to the African, Caribbean, Pacific, and European Union Parliamentary Assembly (ACP-EU), serving as vice-chairman of the ACP-EU Economic Committee at its meeting in Prague, Czech Republic in April 2009.

On 28 October 2014 Tambuwal formally defected from the ruling PDP to the opposition APC, and a few days later his security details were withdrawn by the inspector general of police. This move was criticised by Nigerians as being undemocratic, with the legal luminary Olisa Agbakoba (SAN) of the opinion that the police authority had erred in withdrawing Tambuwal's aid since police are not meant to interpret the law.

=== Governor of Sokoto State ===
On 11 April 2015 Tambuwal contested and won the governorship election of Sokoto State and was inaugurated on 29 May 2015.

On 4 July 2018 Tabuawal dissolved the entire Sokoto State Executive Council, and on 1 August 2018 he defected from the APC back to the PDP. He was reelected as governor of Sokoto State in the Sokoto State governorship election of 9 March 9 2019 and also in the Sokoto State supplementary election of 22 March 2019, polling 512,002 votes to his APC rival Aliyu's 511,660 votes.

=== Running for president ===
In October 2018 Tambuwal declared that he was running for president, saying he was forced to seek the highest position in order to "revive the dying economy". His declaration came hours after Senate president Bukola Saraki officially joined the list of 12 candidates in the race for the main opposition PDP nomination, a list that included four candidates from the north western region as well as Tambuwal.

Tambuwal was popular in the race and was among the top four candidates, along with Atiku Abubakar, Rabiu Kwankwaso, and Bukola Saraki. He was widely expected to win the primary, with his young age among the contestants, his political experience, and his untainted record regarding corruption all seen as boosting his chances. Analysts predicted that should Tambuwal clinch the PDP ticket he would be a formidable challenge to incumbent President Muhammadu Buhari, a northern Muslim who was running for reelection.

Governor Nyesom Wike of Rivers State was Tambuwal's main backer for the PDP nomination, reportedly because of his ambition to be the vice presidential candidate should Tambuwal win the PDP nomination. However, there were complaints by other aspirants that Wike was planning to manipulate the results of the primary to favour Tambuwal, fears stemming from the fact that Wike had overwhelming influence over the National Executive Committee (NEC) of the party since he had single-handedly installed its chairman, Uche Secondus. Fear of manipulation of the primary also came from Wike being the biggest financier of the party, and from the primary being conducted in his home state, where he had so much power. Some presidential aspirants asked the National Working Committee of the party to move the convention from Port Harcourt to a neutral location where Wike would not have so much much influence, but Wike threatened to polarize the party should the convention venue be moved out of Rivers State.

The primary was conducted in the city of Port Harcourt on 6 October 2018, resulting in Tambuwal placing second behind Atiku Abubakar, who won with 1,532 delegate votes to Tambuwal's 693 votes. Bukola Saraki scored 317 and Rabiu Kwankwaso 158 votes.

On 8 August 2023 Tambuwal was named the chairman of the Senate Committee on Housing of the 10th senate.

== Corruption allegations and misconduct ==
On 26 September 2015 the Economic and Financial Crimes Commission (EFCC) challenged the power of Tambuwal to pardon five defendants for an alleged 15 billion naira fraud. The defendants included a serving commissioner in Tambuwal's cabinet and a former governor of Sokoto State, Attahiru Bafaraw.

On 2 April 2022 the EFCC revealed that over a six year period Tambuwal had diverted 189 billion naira from a state-owned account to the accounts of the private individuals Abubakar Mohammed Barau, Abubakar Bello Gandi, Buba S Sambo, and others.

On 18 September 2025 Sokoto State government alleged that Tambuwal's administration did not account for 16.1 billion naira of shares sold through the Sokoto Investment Company.

== Achievements as governor ==
Tambuwal became governor of a Sokoto State that had been poorly managed. Over 1.1 million children were reported to be out of school, jobless youths roamed the street, the hospital was non-functional, and local government areas had totally collapsed. After being sworn in as governor Tambuwal sought to streamline government processes and protocols, setting up a committee task force populated by people from across party lines to recover lost and stolen government properties and monies. He also launched an exercise to rid the Sokoto State civil service of ghost workers. The committee task force was able to recover billions of naira for the state, monies that Tambuwal put to work immediately on infrastructure such as roads, international standards, schools, water treatment plants, hospital upgrades and refurbishment, agriculture and farming, power and water supply to rural communities, and other critical sectors of the state.

=== Healthcare ===
The Tambuwal administration launched a major campaign to revamp and upgrade the healthcare delivery system in the state, beginning with healthcare infrastructure. Within the first five years, 250 primary healthcare centers in rural communities were constructed, renovated, upgraded, or fully equipped. Similarly, the Tambuwal administration constructed, renovated, upgraded, and fully equipped Sokoto State University Teaching Hospital, Kasarawa, and Premier Hospital in the Tambuwal Local Government Area (LGA). It also constructed general hospitals in three senatorial zones and an advanced medical diagnostic and imaging centre in Farufaru, in the Wamako LGA. Under Tambuwal's health intervention initiative about 600 surgeries and more than 4000 other medical cases were sponsored.

=== Road construction ===
In his eight years as the governor of Sokoto State, Tambuwal constructed over 100 kilometres of new roads and flyovers in rural communities and farmlands areas. A 12 kilometre dual carriage road in Wamako LGA was built, and two flyovers were designed in order to decongest traffic within the city, one at Dandima roundabout in Sokoto North LGA and the other at Runjin Sambo in Sokoto South LGA. The Tambuwal administration also constructed a 50 kilometre road linking the three communities of Illela Huda, Gare, and Gidan Mata.

=== Empowerment ===
The Tambuwal administration launched sustainable empowerment programs in Sokoto State, including spending over 5 billion naira on Sustainable Development Goals intervention programmes (SDGs). Seventeen hundred male and female youths were trained by the state government for skills acquisition, 100 commercial buses were distributed across the state's 23 LGAs, and a micro grant scheme was funded with 300 million naira.

=== Education ===
Tambuwal's administration declared a state of emergency in the state education sector in December 2015, subsequently increasing the state budgetary allocation to the education sector, creating an agency focused on getting more girls into school by engaging with their parents and communities, building two junior secondary schools in all 23 LGAs, and renovating 1500 primary schools and 180 junior secondary schools across all LGAs. The Tambuwal administration also moved Shehu Shagari College of Education to the University of Education and established a school of nursing and midwifery in Kware LGA. It also approved the payment of NECO and NABTEB exams fees for all of the 23,000 SS3 students of the government senior secondary schools across the state.

=== Farming ===
The Tambuwal administration also prioritised agriculture, procuring over 10,000 metric tons of fertiliser for Sokoto State farmers and distributing 120 Massey Ferguson tractors across the 23 LGAs. With the intervention of the World Bank, the Sokoto State empowered 3500 people in the Agro-Processing Productivity Enhancement and Livelihood Improvement Support (APPEALS), and also completed the Independent Power Project (IPP) at Kalambaina. The administration also constructed Gidan Salanke Housing Estate at the College of Agriculture, Wurno, and secured a 4 billion naira intervention fund from the Central Bank of Nigeria (CBN) for 16,000 rice and tomato farmers.

=== Security ===
The Sokoto State Government has ensured that the security sector transparently supplies security as a public good and that there is a synergy between all the military deployed in the state. This has led Sokoto State to have a peaceful atmosphere, and has reduced previously endemic crimes such as kidnapping, banditry, and armed robbery. The Tambuwal administration has also tackled security challenges through the establishment of a regulatory commission and by providing security agencies with the logistics and allowances to look after their welfare, including more than 500 vehicles.

== Awards and recognition ==
- African Union Economic and Social Council Award
- African Confers Governance Awards
- Silverbird's 2019 Man of the Year Award
- World Bank Award of Excellence
- Best Performing Governor in education in Nigeria
- Governor Of The Year Award
- Honorary Doctor of Laws from Usman Danfodio University, Sokoto, 2012
- Honorary Doctor of Law from Achievers University, Owo, Ondo State, 2019
- Honorary Doctorate Degree from Enugu State University of Science and Technology, Owo, Ondo State, 2013
- Honorary Doctor of Public Administration from Godfrey Okoye Catholic University, Enugu
- Sokoto State Government Merit Award, 2012
- Priz la Foundation 2013 by Crans Montana forum on Africa & South-South Cooperation

== Honours and titles ==
- I kyar 1 Tiv
- Osagie of Opoji kingdom, Edo State
- Obong Ufam of Akwa-Ibom State
- Udonyi Oro of Oron, Akwa-Ibom State
- Bobagunwa of Ilawe, Ekiti State
- Aridunnu of Ijero kingdom, Ekiti State
- Ikeoha of Obingwa, Abia State
- Danmajen Zuru, Kebbi State
- Garkuwan Lafiagi, Kwara State
- Maidawakin Gashaka, Taraba State
- Matawallen Sokoto

== Professional affiliations ==
Tambuwal has been an active member of the Nigerian Bar Association (NBA), filling the following positions over the years:

- Member, Nigerian Bar Association
- Public relations officer (1996–1997)
- Member, Constitution Review Committee (1997–1998)
- Sokoto branch secretary (1997–1998)
- Assistant national financial secretary (1998–2000)
- First assistant national secretary (2000–2002)
- Member, Body of Benchers Nigeria
- Member, International Bar Association
- Member, American Bar Association
