= Kulu Abdullahi Sifawa =

Commissioner for Women Affairs, Sokoto State

Kulu Abdullahi Sifawa is the current commissioner for Women Affairs Sokoto State, Nigeria, appointed by governor Aminu Tambuwal.

== Career ==
As commissioner for Women Affairs of Sokoto State, Sifawa advocated prosecution for anyone who is found engaging in child or woman abuse. This proposal was made at a meeting attended by civil society representatives, traditional rulers, media representatives, and security agencies. Later, some abuse allegations in the state were resolved. She has also initiated efforts to provide counseling and rehabilitation for children who have been incarcerated for minor offenses.
