= Abdullahi Balarabe Salame =

Nigerian politician

Dr. Abdullahi Balarabe Salame

Member of Federal House of Representatives (National House of Assembly Abuja) representing Gwadabawa/Illela.
- Preceded by: Hon.Haliru Gidan Hamma
- In office 2011–2023

Member of Sokoto State House of Assembly, represented Gwadabawa East.
- In office 2007–2011
- Preceded by: Hon. Alhaji Chika Abubakar

Personal details
- Born: 5 March 1961 (age 65) Salame; Gwadabawa, Sokoto.
- Education: Usmanu Danfodiyo University Sokoto. Shehu Shagari College of Education Sokoto.
- Occupation: Public Servant

Abdullahi Balarabe Salame (born 5 March 1961) is a Nigerian politician from Salame, Gwadabawa Local government, Sokoto State, Nigeria. He is a member of parliament for Gwadabawa and Illela constituency, at Federal House of Representatives under a platform of All Progressive Congress (APC) and is a chairman house committee on poverty alleviation. He was a speaker of Sokoto State house of assembly from 2007 to 2011 who represented Gwadabawa East, and also served as acting governor of the state from 11 April to 28 May 2008.

Salame was appointed acting governor when the election of Aliyu Magatakarda Wamakko was annulled, and held the position until Wamakko was returned after a fresh election. Speaking in May 2008 while receiving a delegation of caretaker L.G.A Councillors, he urged caution, and said that anyone elected to serve the people is expected to approach problems with a high sense of understanding.

In July 2008 he was elected treasurer of the nineteen-member Northern States Speakers' Forum.

In August 2008 he said that the state government was determined to support the National Council for the Welfare of the Destitute (NCWD) self-reliance program in cooperation with the Sultanate, and hoped that more destitutes would benefit from the council's training program. In July 2009 he spoke at the launch of a program to immunize more than 800,000 children under five years of age in Sokoto State, which was controversial because of people, backed by Islamic clerics, feared the program was a contraceptive designed to reduce the population of the region. He deduced that it was essential for parents to ensure that their children were immunized against the killer disease.

== Early life and education ==
Abdullahi Balarabe Salame was born on 5 March 1961 in Salame, Gwadabawa local government, Sokoto State. He attended L.E.A primary school in Salame, Gwadabawa local government in 1975. Arabic teacher's grade 3 Giginya memorial college Sokoto in 1977. Higher Islamic Studies college of Arts and Islamic studies, Sokoto in 1981.

Graduate diploma in education (G.D.E) Shehu Shagari College of Education Sokoto in 2005. Diploma in computer studies Sokoto Polytechnic in 2003. N.C.E Arabic and Islamic Studies (Arabic medium) Shehu Shagari College of Education Sokoto in 1985.

He holds a bachelor's degree B.A. in Arabic, from Usmanu Danfodiyo University, Sokoto. He served in 1990. He went further and obtained his master's degree M.A. Islamic studies, in 2002 at Usmanu Danfodiyo University, Sokoto and PhD Islamic studies, 2010 at the same university.

== Political career ==
He worked in different levels in both Federal and state government. He was a Member of the Federal House of Representatives Abuja, representing Gwadabawa/Illela constituency from 2011 to 2023. He was the acting Governor of Sokoto State from April 2008 to May 2008. He was then a speaker of Sokoto State House of Assembly from June 2007 to June 2011 representing Gwadabawa East.

== Other career ==
In addition, he was a chairman, house committee on Nigeria-Saudi Arabia Parliamentary Friendship and Hajj affairs 2016. ECOWAS Observer, Sierra Leone 2012, presidential election. He was also parliamentarian, ECOWAS parliament, Abuja 2011, Exco member common wealth parliamentary association, African region from 2009 to 2011.

He was a Treasurer. National Speakers Conference from 2009 to 2011. Treasure. Northern Speakers Forum from 2009 to 2011. Amral-Hajj Leader of Government Delegation, 2008 Hajj operation Sokoto state. Chairman, Local Organizing Committee (LOC) 2008 National Quranic Recitation, Sokoto.

== See also ==
- Sokoto State University
- Shehu Shagari
