= Wurno =

- LGA and town
- Interactive map of Wurno
- Location within Nigeria
- Coordinates: 13°17′3″N 5°25′39″E
- Country: Nigeria
- State: Sokoto State

Government
  - Local Government Chairman: Abba Isah Sadiq Achida

Area
  - Total: 685 km^{2} (264 sq mi)

Population (2006)
  - Total: 162,307
  - Density: 237/km^{2} (614/sq mi)
- Time zone: UTC+1 (WAT)
- 3-digit postal code prefix: 842
- ISO 3166 code: NG.SO.WU

Wurno is a town and Local Government Area, near the Gagere River in Sokoto State, Nigeria.

It has an area of 685 km^{2} and a population of 180,219 at the 2023 census.

The postal code of the area is 842.

== History ==
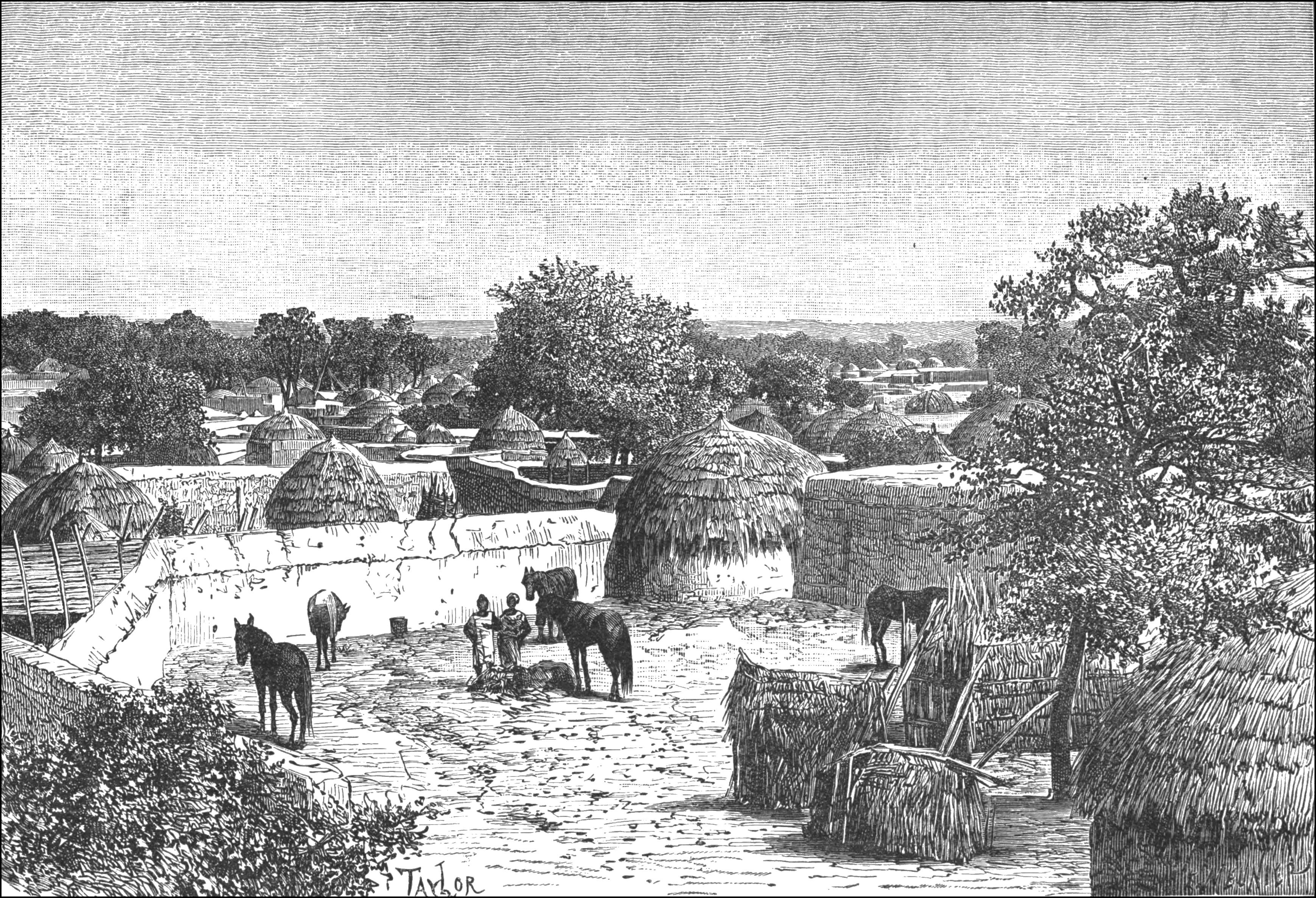
A view of Wurno in 1892

Wurno was founded in 1830 by Muhammad Bello, Caliph of the Sokoto Caliphate (r. 1817–1837). It was established as a ribat (fort) to defend Sokoto from the northeast, serving as Bello's principal ribat and residence in the area. Wurno was the staging point for the annual dry-season campaigns against the Gobirawa and other enemies of the Caliphate. Bello's successors sometimes made it their capital, especially towards the end of the 19th century. Upon his death, Bello was buried in the ribat, on his insistence.

The town was a major agricultural center within the Caliphate, providing substantial agricultural supplies to Sokoto. Every major official of the Caliphate had a plantation there, and much of Sokoto's food came from Wurno. A key figure in Wurno's agricultural success was Muhammad Buji, a member of the former ruling family of Kebbi. He moved from Bunkari to Wurno in response to Bello's call and taught the residents advanced agricultural techniques, especially for dry season cultivation. This expertise led to his appointment as the first Faddama, a post passed down to his descendants. As Faddama, he oversaw dry season cultivation and administered the Fadama ward of Wurno. His relocation also encouraged many people from Bunkari to join him in Wurno.

== Climate ==
A hot, oppressive rainy season with predominantly cloudy skies and a scorching, partly cloudy dry season with temperatures between 17 °C or 62 °F and 41 °C or 105 °F are both characteristics of the climate.
