= Abdullahi Kalambaina =

Nigerian politician

Federal Representative
- Constituency: Kware/Wamakko

Personal details
- Party: All Progressive Congress (APC)
- Occupation: Politician

Alhaji Abdullahi Kalambaina, is a Nigerian politician under the All Progressives Congress (APC). He represents the Kware/Wamakko Federal Constituency of Sokoto State in the House of Representatives, in 2019. He was elected under the platform of the All Progressive Congress (APC).

== Early life and education ==
Kalambaina was born on 13 September 1968 in Kware, Sokoto State, Nigeria.

== Political career ==
Before joining the House of Representatives of Nigeria, he served in local government administration. He was a councillor, later became vice chairman and chairman of Wamakko Local Government Area in Sokoto State, and also served as secretary of the Association of Local Governments of Nigeria (ALGON) in the state. He was elected to represent the Kware/Wamakko Federal Constituency of Sokoto State in the House of Representatives under the platform of the All Progressives Congress (APC).
