= Gwadabawa =

- LGA and town
- Interactive map of Gwadabawa
- Location within Nigeria
- Coordinates: 13°22′11″N 5°13′48″E
- Country: Nigeria
- State: Sokoto State

Government
  - Local Government Chairman: Ibrahim Aliyu Sakamaru

Area
  - Total: 991 km^{2} (383 sq mi)

Population (2006)
  - Total: 231,358
  - Density: 233/km^{2} (605/sq mi)
- Time zone: UTC+1 (WAT)
- 3-digit postal code prefix: 843
- ISO 3166 code: NG.SO.GW

Gwadabawa is a town and Local Government Area on the A1 highway in Sokoto State, Nigeria. It comprises Gwadabawa, Salame, Chimola and Asara districts.

It has an area of 991 km^{2} and a population of 231,358 at the 2006 census.

The postal code of the area is 843.

== Climate ==
The climate experiences a hot, oppressive wet season with mostly cloudy skies, and a sweltering, partly cloudy dry season with temperatures ranging from 17 °C (62 °F) to 41 °C (105 °F).

=== Temperature ===
Between March 17 to May 26, or 2.3 months, the average daily maximum temperature rises above 38 °C (101 °F) during the hot season. Averaging a high temperature of 41 °C (105 °F) and a low of 27 °C (80 °F), April is the hottest month in Gwadabawa. There is an average daily high temperature below 33 °C (91 °F) during the 1.6-month mild season, which runs from December 10 to January 30. At an average low of 17 °C (63 °F) and high of 32 °C (89 °F), January is the coldest month of the year in Gwadabawa.
