= Abdullahi Ibrahim Gobir =

Nigerian politician (born 1958)

Abdullahi Ibrahim Gobir Sardauna of Gobir

Senate Majority Leader
- In office 27 July 2022 – 11 June 2023
- Preceded by: Yahaya Abubakar Abdullahi
- Succeeded by: Michael Opeyemi Bamidele

Senator for Sokoto East
- In office 6 June 2011 – 11 June 2023
- Preceded by: Abubakar Umar Gada
- Succeeded by: Ibrahim Lamido

North West Representative, NDDC
- Incumbent
- Assumed office 29 August 2023

Personal details
- Born: 1 January 1958 (age 68) Sabon Birni, Northern Region, British Nigeria (now in Sokoto State, Nigeria)
- Party: All Progressives Congress

Abdullahi Ibrahim Gobir (born 1 January 1958) is a Nigerian politician who was Senator for Sokoto East from 2011 to 2023. He was the Senate Majority Leader from July 2022 to July 2023.

Gobir holds a master's degree in electrical engineering from the University of Detroit in the United States, and a doctoral degree in electrical engineering and energy from Abubakar Tafawa Balewa University in Bauchi, Nigeria. He is a Chartered Engineer and a Fellow of the Institute of Electrical Engineers (UK) and of the Nigerian Society of Engineers.

Gobir began his career with the Ministry of Communication, and then joined the Nigerian Television Authority in Sokoto. He became the Director of Union Bank of Nigeria in 2002. He also became the Managing Director of Taifo Multi Services Limited, Abuja. Before entering politics, he was the Chairman of the Cement Company of Northern Nigeria, based in the state.

At the PDP primaries, Gobir defeated the incumbent Senator Abubakar Umar Gada by 1,547 against 60 votes. He went on to be elected to the Senate.

In July 2022, Gobir was selected as APC senate majority leader. In August 2023, Gobir was appointed as the northwest representative in the NDDC by president bola Ahmed tinubu.
