= Abubakar Umar Gada =

Nigerian politician

National Senator
- In office May 2007 – May 2011
- Preceded by: Sule Yari Gandi
- Succeeded by: Abdullahi Ibrahim Gobir
- Constituency: Sokoto East

Personal details
- Born: 16 January 1966 (age 60)
- Party: People's Democratic Party (PDP)
- Profession: Businessman, Politician

Abubakar Umar Gada was a Nigerian senator who represented the People's Democratic Party (PDP) in Sokoto State. He became a member of the Nigerian Senate in 2007.

== Background ==
Abubakar Umar Gada was born on 16 January 1966. He has a master's degree in public administration, a master's degree in business administration, a post graduate diploma in public administration and a Bachelor Of Science. Before engaging in politics, he was a Crude Oil marketer for the Nigerian National Petroleum Corporation. He first entered politics in 2003, in a failed attempt to become a deputy governor of Sokoto state.

== Senate career ==
Abubakar Umar Gada was elected senator for Sokoto East in 2007. He was appointed to committees on Integration and Cooperation, Establishment & Public Service, Downstream Petroleum, Communications, Commerce, Water Resources and Women and Youth.

In July 2007, speaking on the failure of Bode Agusto from Lagos to secure senate confirmation, Gada said the former director-general of the Budget Office performed very poorly during Obasanjo's regime, and showed contempt for the National Assembly.

In April 2008, the Senate established a twelve-man ad hoc committee chaired by Senator Heineken Lokpobiri to investigate the management of funds appropriated for the transport sector since 1999. Senator Gada was named to the committee. In May 2008, Gada was one of the senators appointed to the National Assembly Joint Committee on Constitution Review.

Speaking about the Petroleum Industry Bill (PIB) in April 2009, Senator Gada, who is Vice Chairman of the Senate Committee on Downstream Petroleum, said that the bill had to be subjected to thorough scrutiny to ensure that it achieved its objectives.

In July 2009, violence erupted in Maiduguri, Borno State in which the army attacked a compound and mosque used by the militant Islamist Boko Haram group, killing their deputy leader and 200 followers. Commenting on the incident, Abubakar Umar Gada said the Boko Haram had taken advantage of the large number of people without jobs or opportunities to better themselves. In a press interview, Gada condemned the rating of senators through the numbers of sponsored Bills, stating that their contribution as the bill was processed was also of great importance.

Ibrahim Gada competed at the PDP primaries in January 2011 to again be the Sokoto East Senatorial candidate. However, he was beaten by Abdullahi Ibrahim Gobir, who polled 1,547 votes to Gada's 60 votes. Gobir went on to be elected.
