= Sokoto (city) =

Capital city of Sokoto State, Nigeria

- City
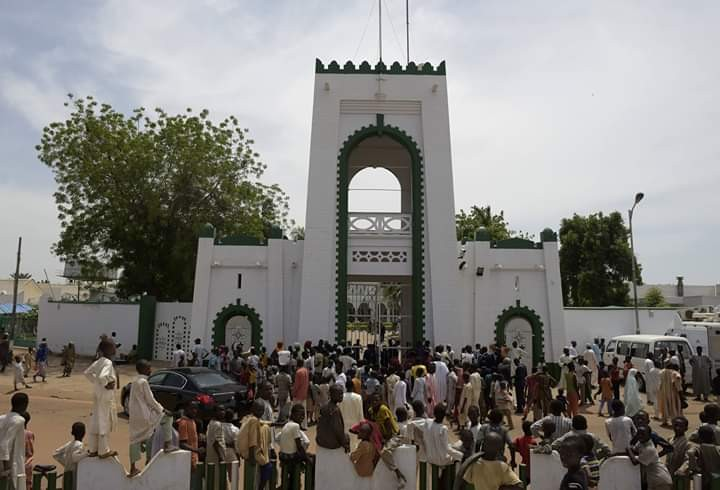
- Sultan's Place

- Location in Nigeria
- Coordinates: 13°03′44″N 5°14′02″E
- Country: Nigeria
- State: Sokoto State
- LGAs: Sokoto North; Sokoto South

Government
  - Sultan: Sa'adu Abubakar
  - Governor: Ahmad Aliyu Sokoto

Population (2022)
  - City: 743,400 (Sokoto North + Sokoto South)
  - Rank: 13th in Nigeria
  - Urban: 790,000
  - Metro: 1,040,000

GDP (PPP, 2015 int. Dollar)
  - Year: 2023
  - Total: $3,3 billion
  - Per capita: $4,600
- Climate: BSh

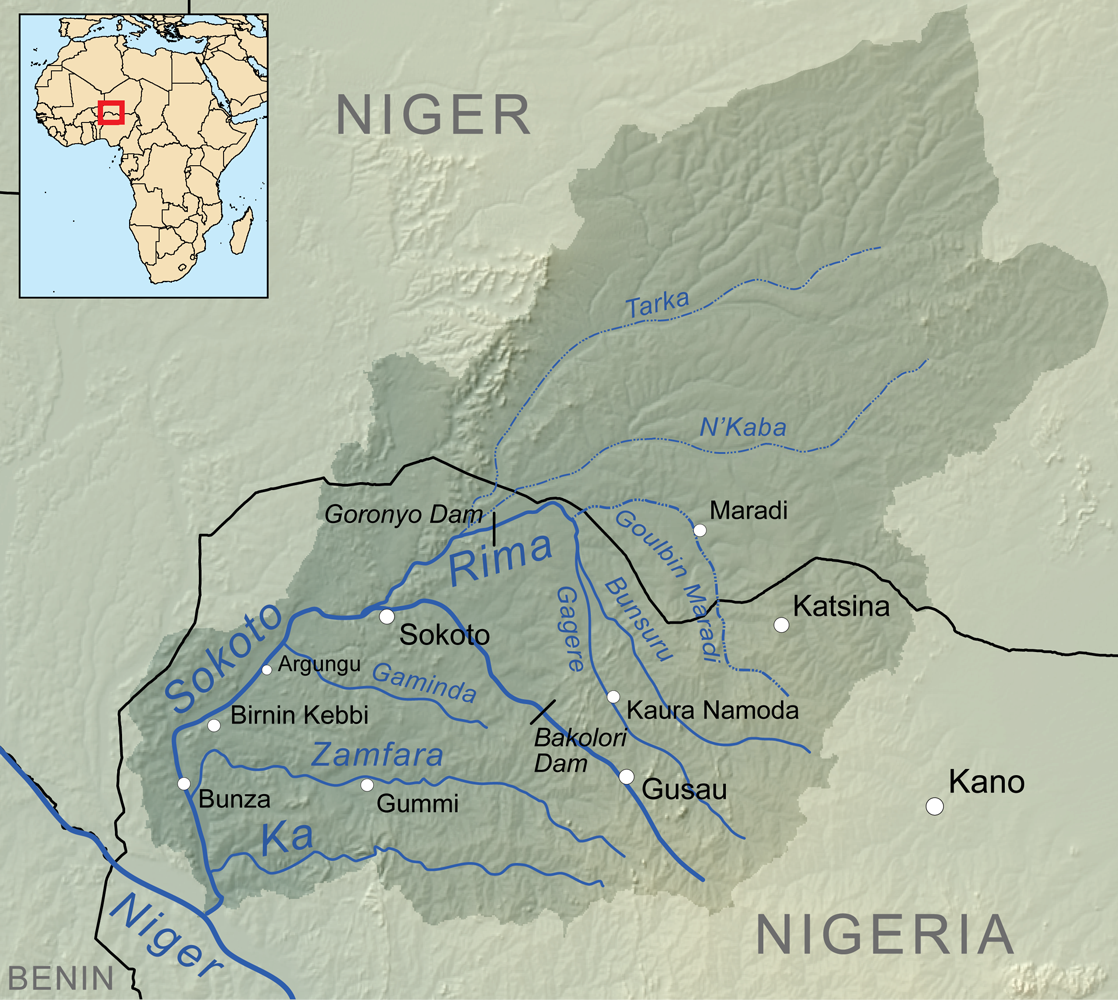
Sokoto river basin, showing location of the city

Sokoto is a major city located in extreme north-western Nigeria, near the confluence of the Sokoto River and the Rima River. As of 2006, it had a population of over 427,760. Sokoto is the modern-day capital of Sokoto State and was previously the capital of the north-western states. Modern Sokoto is known for trading sheepskins, cattle hides, leather crafts (a significant export), kola nuts and goatskins.

The historic seat of the former Sokoto Caliphate, the city is predominantly Muslim and an important seat of Islamic learning in Nigeria. The Sultan who heads the caliphate is effectively the spiritual leader of Nigerian Muslims.

== Name and etymology ==
The name Sokoto (which is the modern/anglicised version of the local name, Sakkwato) is of Arabic origin, representing sooq, 'market' in English. It is also known as Sakkwato, Birnin Shaihu da Bello or "Sokoto, City of Shaihu and Bello" (Shaihu referring to Sheikh Usman dan Fodio, founder of the Sokoto Caliphate, and Bello his son/successor, Sultan Muhammad Bello).

== Climate ==
Sokoto has a hot semi-arid climate (Köppen climate classification BSh). It is located in the dry Sahel, surrounded by sandy savannah and isolated hills.

With an annual average temperature of 28.3 °C (82.9 °F), Sokoto is one of the hottest cities in Nigeria. However the maximum daytime temperatures are generally under 40 °C (104.0 °F) most of the year, and the dryness makes the heat bearable. The warmest months are February to April, where daytime temperatures can exceed 40 °C. The highest recorded temperature is 45 °C. The rainy season is from June to October, during which showers are a daily occurrence. The showers rarely last long and are a far cry from the regular torrential showers known in many tropical regions. From late October to February, during the 'cold season', the climate is dominated by the harmattan wind blowing Sahara dust over the land. The dust dims the sunlight, thereby reducing temperatures significantly.

The region's lifeline for growing crops is the floodplains of the Sokoto-Rima river system, which are covered with rich alluvial soil. For the rest, the crops cultivated in Sokoto includes millet, guinea corn, beans perhaps being the most abundant, followed by maize, rice, sesame, other cereals and vegetables such as: onions, tomatoes, pepper, garden egg, lettuce, and cabbage. Apart from millet, Sokoto is the major onion producer in Nigeria. In terms of vegetation, Sokoto falls within the savannah zone. This is an open tse-tse fly-free grassland suitable for cultivation of grain crops and animal husbandry. Rain starts late and ends early with mean annual rainfall ranging between 500 mm and 1,300 mm. There are two major seasons in Sokoto, namely wet and dry. The dry season starts from October, and lasts up to April in some parts and may extend to May or June in other parts. The wet season on the other hand begins in most parts of the state in May and lasts up to September, or October. The harmattan, a dry, cold, and fairly dusty wind is experienced in the state between November and February. Heat is more severe in the state in March and April. But the weather in the state is always cold in the morning and hot in the afternoons, save in peak harmattan period.

The topography of the state is dominated by the Hausa plain of northern Nigeria. The vast irrigable land of the Sokoto-Rima River systems dissects the plain and provides the rich alluvial soil fit for a variety of crop cultivation in the state. There are also isolated hills and mountains scattered all over the state.

Climate data for Sokoto (1991–2020)
Month	Jan	Feb	Mar	Apr	May	Jun	Jul	Aug	Sep	Oct	Nov	Dec	Year
Record high °C (°F)	39.8 (103.6)	43.2 (109.8)	44.2 (111.6)	44.4 (111.9)	44.8 (112.6)	42.9 (109.2)	39.0 (102.2)	39.0 (102.2)	38.1 (100.6)	40.0 (104.0)	41.0 (105.8)	40.0 (104.0)	44.8 (112.6)
Mean daily maximum °C (°F)	32.6 (90.7)	35.7 (96.3)	39.3 (102.7)	41.1 (106.0)	39.2 (102.6)	36.2 (97.2)	32.9 (91.2)	31.1 (88.0)	32.9 (91.2)	36.2 (97.2)	36.6 (97.9)	33.6 (92.5)	35.6 (96.1)
Daily mean °C (°F)	24.8 (76.6)	27.8 (82.0)	31.5 (88.7)	34.0 (93.2)	33.3 (91.9)	30.9 (87.6)	28.3 (82.9)	27.0 (80.6)	28.0 (82.4)	29.7 (85.5)	28.5 (83.3)	25.6 (78.1)	29.1 (84.4)
Mean daily minimum °C (°F)	16.9 (62.4)	19.9 (67.8)	23.6 (74.5)	27.0 (80.6)	27.3 (81.1)	25.5 (77.9)	23.7 (74.7)	22.8 (73.0)	23.1 (73.6)	23.2 (73.8)	20.4 (68.7)	17.6 (63.7)	22.6 (72.7)
Record low °C (°F)	10.8 (51.4)	11.3 (52.3)	13.6 (56.5)	15.8 (60.4)	19.5 (67.1)	18.0 (64.4)	19.0 (66.2)	19.0 (66.2)	18.5 (65.3)	16.5 (61.7)	15.0 (59.0)	11.0 (51.8)	10.8 (51.4)
Average precipitation mm (inches)	0.1 (0.00)	0.1 (0.00)	0.5 (0.02)	8.9 (0.35)	51.8 (2.04)	81.6 (3.21)	181.5 (7.15)	211.3 (8.32)	124.4 (4.90)	24.9 (0.98)	0.0 (0.0)	0.0 (0.0)	685.1 (26.97)
Average precipitation days (≥ 1.0 mm)	0.0	0.0	0.1	0.8	3.9	5.8	9.9	12.5	8.5	2.0	0.0	0.0	43.5
Average relative humidity (%)	20.2	16.5	16.1	27.0	43.8	55.3	67.3	79.1	78.1	60.5	33.3	25.3	43.5
Mean monthly sunshine hours	288.3	268.4	275.9	255.0	272.8	279.0	229.4	186.0	237.0	303.8	300.0	300.7	3,196.3
Mean daily sunshine hours	9.3	9.5	8.9	8.5	8.8	9.3	7.4	6.0	7.9	9.8	10.0	9.7	8.8
Source 1: NOAA
Source 2: Deutscher Wetterdienst (sun, 1952–1961)

== Historical development ==
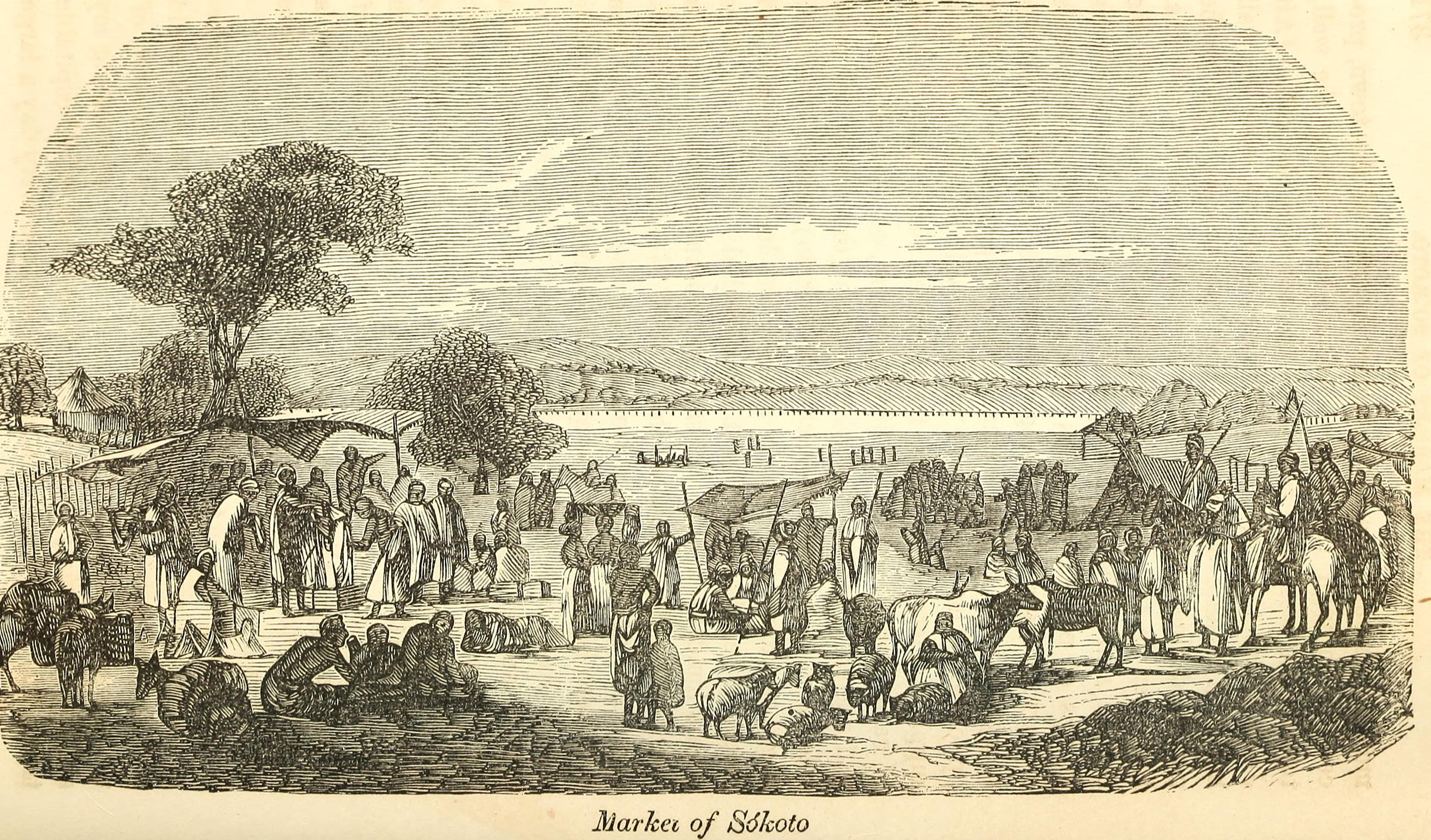
Market at Sokoto, early 1850s

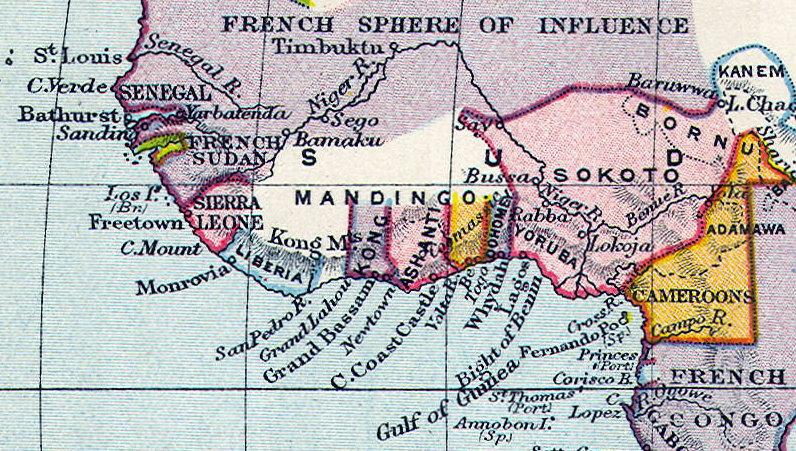
The Sokoto area, crudely shown on an 1897 map

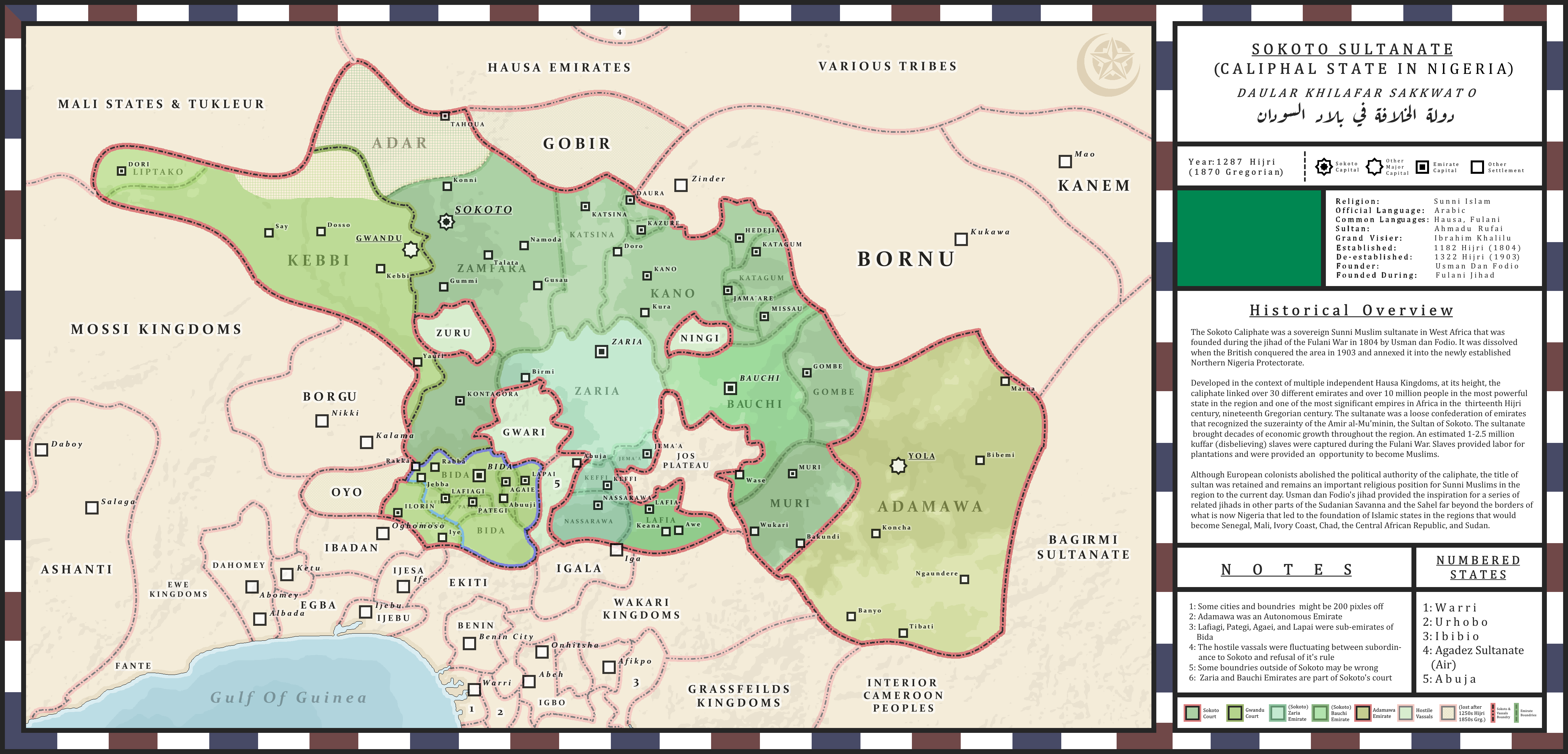
Sokoto Sultanate during the reign of sultan Ahmadu Rufai

A terracotta head was discovered in Sokoto dating back to 300 B.C. Sokoto was established as a city by the 17th Century.

Sokoto had been used as early as October 1804 by the Shehu Usmanu Dan Fodiyo as the venue for the meeting with Galadima, Yunfa's Vizier. Subsequently, it was used by his son Muhammad Bello as a staging post for an attack on Dufua in the spring of 1806. Bovil suggested that the area/district may have been known as Sokoto as early as the seventeenth century. In a historical perspective, Sokoto was founded as a ribat (military camp or frontier) in 1809, when Shehu Usmanu was at Sifawa. It later became the capital of the caliphate after Shehu's death.

In the 1820s, Sokoto was at its peak of prosperity coinciding with the peak of its 'rulers' powers at the center of the caliphate, receiving annual tribute from all the fiefs before a long period of decline. The explorer Hugh Clapperton (1827) was highly impressed by this prosperity and its effects on the city.

Clapperton noted the importance of Sokoto's closely settled surroundings: The rivers, rather than long-distance trade in the city's economy. But trading activities in Sokoto is presently inconsiderable, owing to the disturbed state of the surrounding country.

By the time the explorer Heinrich Barth arrived in 1853, Sokoto was thinly inhabited and greatly dilapidated. Barth in 1857 estimated the population at only 20,000–22,000, but the market was still supplied and attended, and a thriving suburb outside the wall was more animated than Sokoto itself.

Bovil aptly described Sokoto as a strong position, with steep escarpments from the east to the north-west and a small valley on the west and the south west protecting it against surprise cavalry attacks. The town dominates the broad lowland where the two rivers, Rima and Sokoto meet, being the junction of roads from Gobir in the north, Kebbi in the south and Burmi Zamfara in the east.

In the early 19th century, the town (Sokoto) was divided into wards. Such wards include Magajin Gari ward, Waziri ward, Sarkin Musulmi ward, Sarkin Adar ward, Magajin Rafi ward, and Sarkin Zamfara Ward. At this time the wards were small and surrounded with a wall, which included the mosques of Sultan Bello and Shehu, Sultan Palace and other buildings as well as the compound of Shehu.

In 1818, the wall was extended up to the extent that it has gates that come in and out of the Birni wall. Such gates are Kofar-Kade, Kofar-Kware, Kofar-Rini, Kofar-Dundaye, Kofar-Taramniya, Kofar-Aliyu Jedo, and Kofar-Marke.

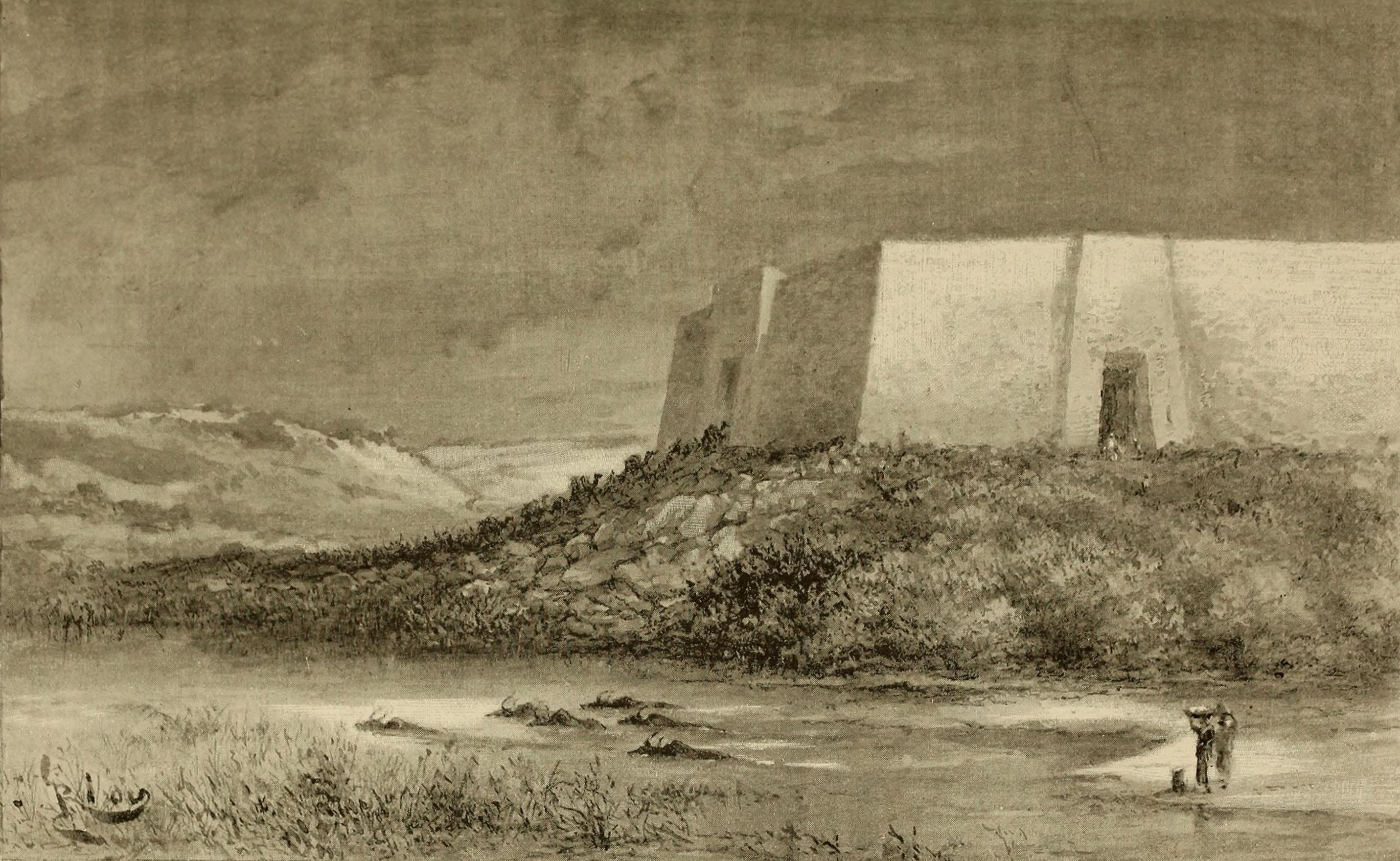
View of the city's outskirts (1890)

The area of the present Sokoto was the home of many empires and kingdoms of the pre-colonial western Sudan. These include the Gobir and Kebbi kingdoms as well as the world-renowned caliphate whose spiritual and political capital is the headquarters of the state.

Following the conquest of the caliphate by the British in 1903, its various components were made autonomous and joined into the government of Northern Nigeria. The northern region was thus made up of mainly parts of the Sokoto caliphate and Kanem-Bornu Empire. This continued up to January 1967 when states were created to replace regional governments by General Yakubu Gowon. Sokoto became the headquarters of the north-western state created in 1967. In 1976 following the creation of Niger state out of North Western state, Sokoto state emerged with its headquarters. Yet in Sokoto, Kebbi and Zamfara states were carved out of Sokoto, in 1991 and 1996 respectively.

Sokoto metropolis has thus been the capital of various governments since its establishment by Caliph Muhammad Bello in 1809.

== People and culture ==
Sokoto state has a projected population of 3.7 million people based on a 2006 census made up of two ethnic groups namely, Fulani and Hausa. Sokoto town, the capital of Sokoto state, has a population of approximately 2.5 million. Apart from Fulani and Hausa, there are the Zabarmawa and Tuareg minorities in the local government border areas. All these groups speak Hausa as a common language. Fulfulde is spoken by the Fulani.

Hausa people in the state are made up of Gobirawa, Zamfarawa, Kabawa, Adarawa and Arawa. The Fulani's on the other hand are of two main groups; the town Fulani (Hausa: Fulanin Gida; Fula: Fulɓe Wuro) and the Nomads. The former includes the Torankawa, the clan of Shehu Usmanu Danfodiyo, Sullubawa and Zoramawa. The Torankawa are the aristocratic class since 1804.

Culturally the state is homogeneous. The people of the state are predominantly Muslim. Their mode of dress is also of Islamic origin. Two major festivals namely, Eid-el-Fitri and Eid-el-Kabir are celebrated in the state every year. The former marks the end of the Ramadan fast, while the latter features the slaughtering of rams in commemoration of an act of the Islamic prophet Ibrahim (the Jewish patriarch Abraham).

Traditional wrestling (Kokawa) and boxing (Dambe) are the two sports enjoyed by the Hausa while the Fulani and the Sullubawa entertain themselves with Sharo and Doro respectively. Important visitors to the state are usually treated to the grand or mini durbar, an event involving the parade of heavily decorated horses and camels mounted by men in full traditional military and cultural attire.

== Pollution ==
The public in Sokoto is at serious risk for serious health problems as a result of the airborne dust, which can cause lung conditions and increase mortality rates, particularly from cardiovascular causes.

== Economic activities ==
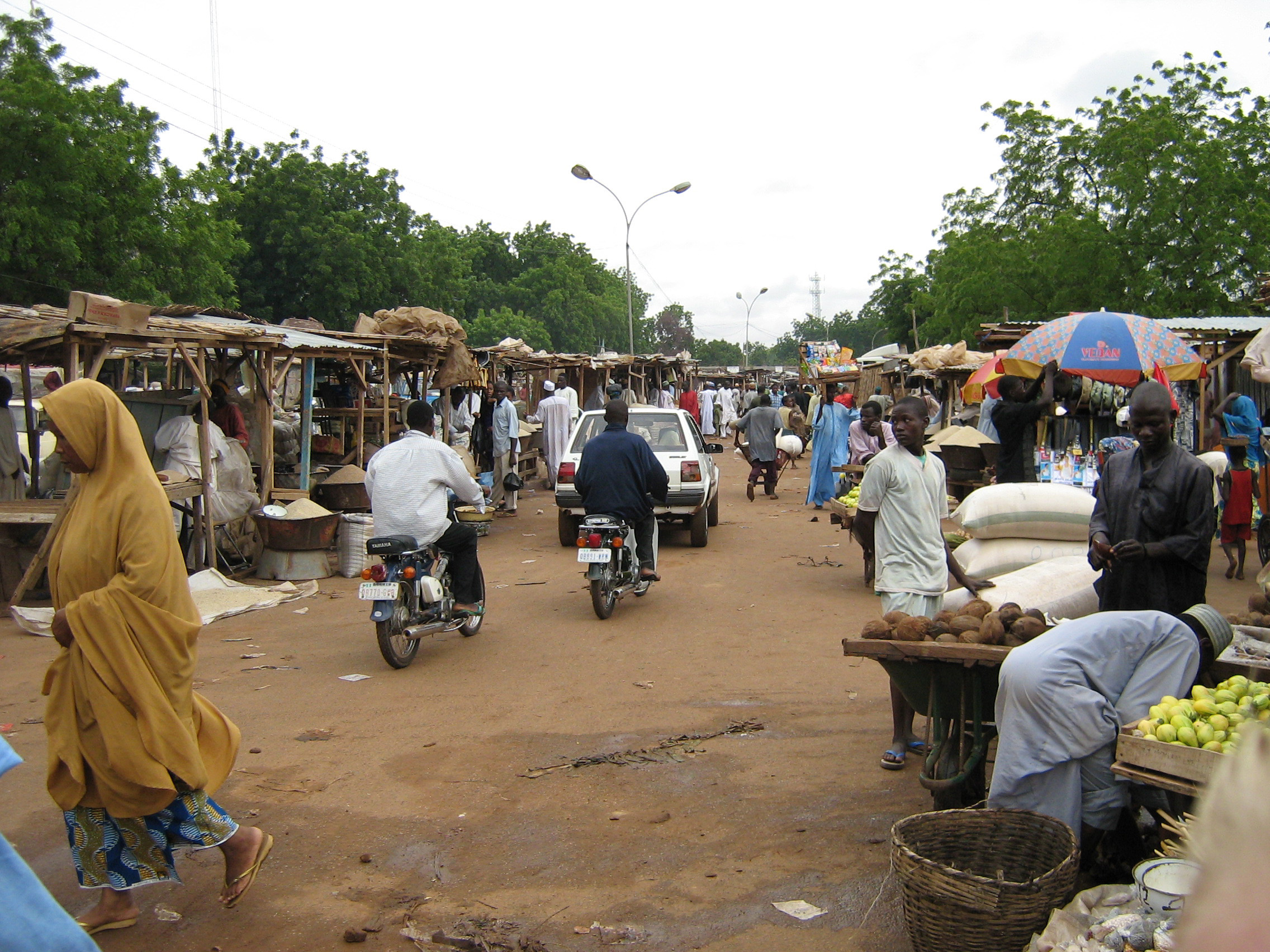
Sokoto Market

Over eighty percent (80%) of the inhabitants of Sokoto practice one form of agriculture or another. They produce crops like millet, guinea corn, maize, rice, potatoes, cassava, groundnuts, beans etc.for subsistence and produce wheat, cotton and vegetables for cash. Local crafts such as blacksmithing, weaving, dyeing, carving and leather works also play an important role in the economic life of the people of Sokoto; as a result, different areas like Makera, Marina, Takalmawa and Majema became important. Sokoto is also one of the fish producing areas of the country. Thus a large number of people along the river basin engage in fishing.

Sokoto is equally endowed with natural and mineral resources. Agro allied industries using cotton, groundnut, sorghum, gum, maize, rice, wheat, sugar cane, cassava, gum Arabic and tobacco as raw materials can be established in the area. Large scale farming can also be practice in the state using irrigation water from Goronyo Dam, Lugu, Kalmalo, Wammakko and Kwakwazo lakes among others.

Mineral resources such as kaolin, gypsum, limestone, laterite, red mills, phosphate both yellow and green, shade clay, sand etc., are available in commercial quantities. Mineral based industries using these raw materials could be established in the state.

The absence of the tse-tse fly on the open grassland benefits both wild and domestic animals. Sokoto ranks second in livestock production in the country's animal population of well over eight million.

The availability of these economic potentials provides good investment opportunities, particularly in agro-allied industries such as flour mills, tomatoes processing, sugar refining, textiles, glue, tanning, fish canning, etc.

== Transport ==
Sokoto lacks a public transport system. Transport within the city (when not by foot) is mainly by mopeds which operate as one-person taxis and sometimes tricycles transport persons from one place to the other; this allows for carriage of more than one person at a time (still at a cheap price as mopeds). Buses and taxis are infrequent and are generally used only for transport between cities.

Remarkably for an area where fewer than 2% of girls finish secondary school, an all-female garage has been established in Sokoto city to train young women on vehicle maintenance. Founded by the Nana: Girls and Women Empowerment Initiative, the garage trains 25 female apprentices with the support of the local Islamic leadership.

10 km south of Sokoto there is an international airport with regular connections to Abuja, Kano and Lagos.

== Industry ==
In August 2008, an agreement was signed for the construction of a cement works in Sokoto, and the plant was opened in 2022.

== Urbanization ==
Urbanization has a very long history in Hausaland. The process started when certain strategic areas of Hausaland developed from Kauyuka to Birane. Yet one of the major consequences of the jihadist was the speeding of this phenomenon not only in Hausaland but also in all areas affected by the caliphate administration. New towns sprang up and the older birane entered into a period of unprecedented growth, some as new areas of commercial activities, others as both Emirate capitals and centers of administration and commerce.

One of the aspects of urbanization in the history of the Sokoto caliphate started with the establishment of Sokoto city (the headquarters of the caliphate). In the prejihad period, the area between the Gobir Kingdom and Kebbi was the area commonly referred to as "nomad land". But with the success of the jihad led by the Shehu usmau dan Fodiyo (1804–1808) and subsequent victory of the jihadists over the rulers of Hausaland, Sokoto city (headquarters of the caliphate) was built by Muhammad Bello. Moreover, as observed by Abdul-Razaq Shehu in his book Sakkwato Birnin Shehu), Sokoto city was designed on paper by Muhammad Bello even before it was built. Bello, son of the Sheikh, was among his father's lieutenants and war commanders. He fought the hardest and longest wars and was the architect of the caliphate Sokoto Birnin Shehu.

Sokoto city as designed by the architect Muhammad Bello consisted of all the characteristic features of any modern city including roads, bridges, market, ganuwa (fortification round centers of town) and as well as administrative and commercial centers. Among the administrative centers designed by Muhammad Bello are Kanwuri, Binanchi, Galadanci, Alkalanci, Dogarawa and so on. However, apart from the central market popularly known as Yardole, other commercial areas designed by Muhammad Bello include Makera, Madinka, Marina, Siriddawa, Takalmawa, Runji and Jirgawa. In addition, among other things no town in either pre-jihad or 19th century Hausaland could develop into an urban center without effective fortification (ganuwa). This was built with many strongpoints like Kofar Aliyu Jedo, Kofar Dundaye, Kofar Marke, Kofar Rini, Kofar Kware, and Kofar Taramniya, and this paramount development attracted many people to migrate from their locality into Sokoto city for survival.

From the above observation on how caliph Muhammad Bello designed the city of Sokoto we will see that Sokoto witnessed more immigrants with interest in blacksmithing leather works, pottery etc. For example, some of these people either engage in the business of blacksmithing or in other related business as in Makera Assada. There are people who used to travel to different parts of present Nigeria and even in neighbouring countries to buy damaged iron materials like damaged vehicles, cars, lorries, aircraft etc. iron pipes, and oil tanks in order to break them into pieces and sell them for anybody who wants to put them into use or modify them into another product.

== Environmental issues ==
=== Climate change ===
Because Sokoto and the urban area around it is already located near a semi-arid zone experiencing desertification, the city already experiences the effects of climate change. A 2018 analysis of the city's potential impacts predicted decreased agricultural output and plant growth, and increased water scarcity in the region around the city, interfering with food security and creating income security challenges.

== Notable people ==
- Attahiru Bafarawa (Former Governor of Sokoto State)
- Sir Ahmadu Bello (Sardauna of Sokoto)
- Mohammed Maigari Dingyadi (Former Minister of Police Affairs Nigeria)
- Shehu Shagari (Former President of Federal Republic of Nigeria)
- Aminu Tambuwal (Former Speaker House of Representatives and Former Governor of Sokoto State)
- Senator Aliyu Magatakarda Wamakko (Former Governor of Sokoto State)
- Ahmad Aliyu, (Governor of Sokoto as of 2023)
- Sa'adu Abubakar (Sultan of Sokoto)

== See also ==
- Sokoto Caliphate
- Usman dan Fodio
- Makera Assada
