= Abdussamad Dasuki =

Nigerian politician and businessmen

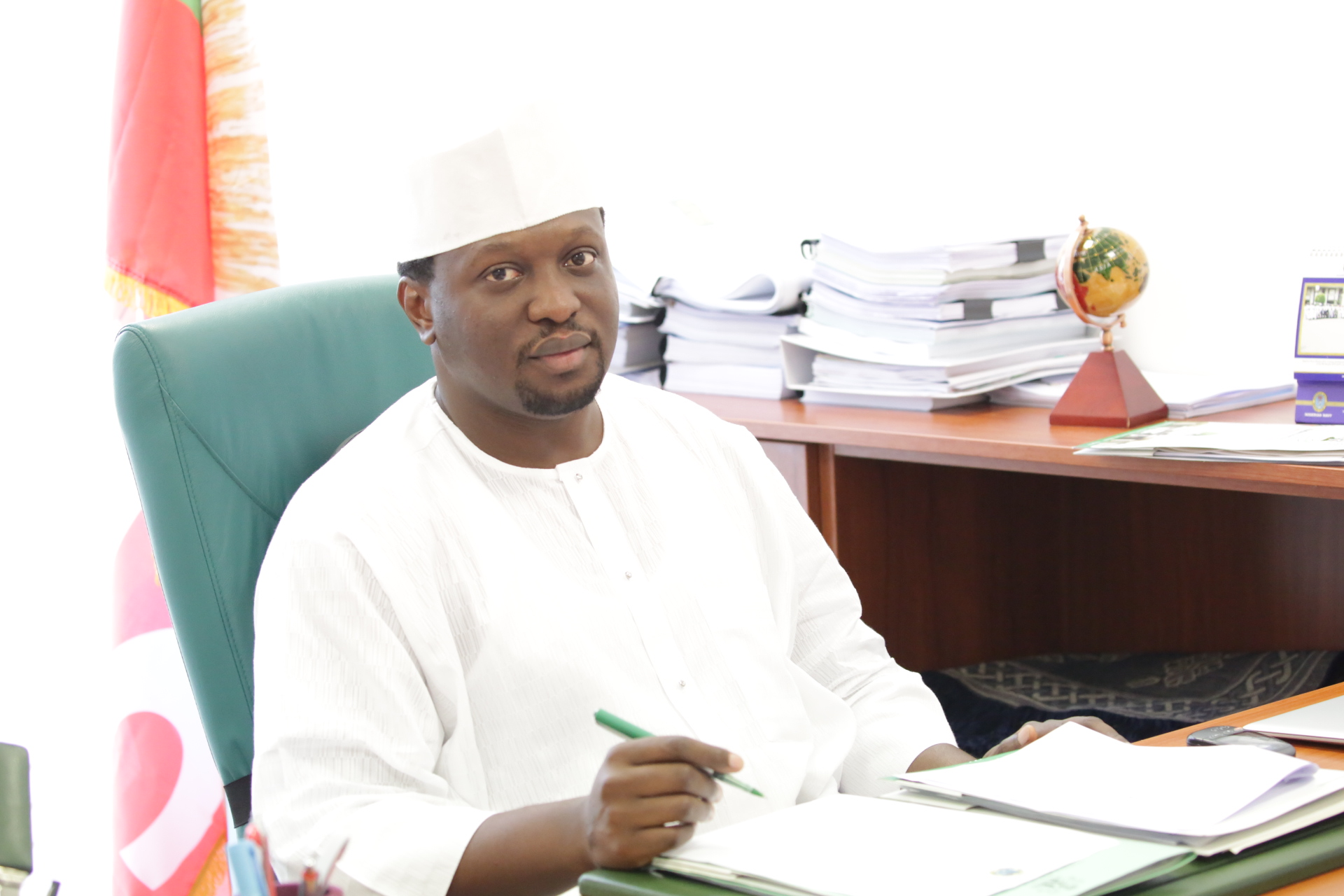

Commissioner of Finance, Sokoto State Government
- In office June 2019 – May 2023
- Governor: Aminu Waziri Tambuwal

Member representing Kebbe/Tambuwal Federal Constituency in the House of Representatives of Nigeria
- In office 2015–2019
- Preceded by: Aminu Waziri Tambuwal

Member representing Tambuwal East constituency in the Sokoto State House of Assembly
- In office 2011–2015

Personal details
- Born: June 30, 1978 (age 47) Sokoto state
- Party: Peoples Democratic Party
- Spouse: Jamila Wada Dasuki
- Education: Federal Staff School, Sokoto
- Alma mater: University of Abuja; Nigerian Defence Academy; Nigerian Military School
- Occupation: Public servant, economist, businessman.

Abdussamad Dasuki (born 30 June 1978) is a Nigerian politician, economist and businessman. He served as the Commissioner of Finance in Sokoto State Government from 2019 to 2023 and served in the Nigerian House of Representatives between 2015 and 2019, representing Kebbe/Tambuwal Federal Constituency of Sokoto State. He is a member of the Peoples Democratic Party (PDP).

== Early life and education ==
Dasuki was born in Sokoto on June 30, 1978 to the family of His Eminence, Alhaji Ibrahim Dasuki, the 18th Sultan of Sokoto. He is the 13th of 27 children.

He had his primary education at Federal Staff School, Sokoto, from 1984 to 1990. In 1991, he was admitted into the Nigerian Military School in Zaria, Kaduna State, which he completed in 1996. His tertiary education began at the Nigerian Defence Academy (NDA), also in Kaduna, in 1997. He was at NDA for three years before gaining admission into the University of Abuja. He studied for a Bachelor's degree in Economics and graduated in 2004.

He obtained certificates including for Business Analysis at the Lagos Business School in 2008 and for Leaders in Development at the Harvard Kennedy School in 2013. Dasuki is an Associate of the Nigerian Institute of Management, the National Institute of Marketing of Nigeria and the Institute of Chartered Economists of Nigeria.

== Professional and political career ==
In 2006, Dasuki took up employment at Dangote Group, where he worked as a Corporate Business Manager until 2010 when he joined politics. As the pioneer head of Dangote/Obajana Cement Business/Marketing unit in Abuja, he oversaw average monthly sales of about N10 billion.

=== Sokoto State House of Assembly ===
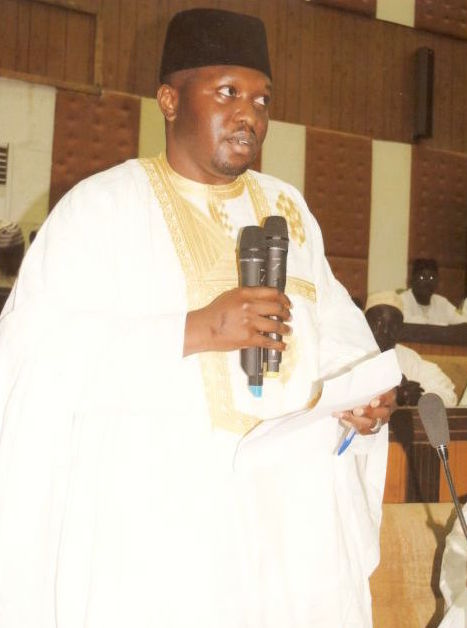
Picture of Abdussamad Dasuki as a Member of the SOHA

In 2011, he contested for – and won – a seat in the Sokoto State House of Assembly, representing Tambuwal East constituency. While at the Sokoto State House of Assembly, he headed two committees namely the Committee on Agriculture (2011-2013) and the Committee on Finance and Appropriation (2013-2015).

Here, he sponsored three bills – which were passed – and represented the State Assembly on many occasions, including at a meeting of Commonwealth Parliamentarians, and at centenary celebrations in the United Kingdom in 2011.

In 2013, he was given an award by the Sokoto state chapter of the All Farmers’ Association of Nigeria for his contributions during his tenure as the Chairman of the committee on agriculture.

==== Bills and motions ====
1. A bill for a law to impose tax on goods and services consumed in Hotels in Sokoto State.
2. A bill for a law to amend the establishment of constitution and functions of Sokoto State Polytechnic and other matters connected therewith.
3. A bill for a law to regulate the operations of motorcycles in Sokoto State with a view to promoting safety and security of the general public.
4. A motion on the need for the rehabilitation of a road at Gudum village along Dogon Daji – Sanyinna road in Tambuwal Local Government area of Sokoto State.
5. A matter of urgent public importance on the need to set up enlightenment task force committee for the registration of the National Farmers Database in Sokoto state.
6. A motion on the need for the utilization of the booster station at Shagari in Shagari Local Government of Sokoto State.
7. A matter of urgent public importance on the need to congratulate Jelani Aliyu on being awarded by then President, Goodluck Jonathan.
8. A motion on the establishment of an additional primary school at Sanyinna in Tambuwal Local Government Area of Sokoto State.
9. A motion on the need for the state government and other related agencies to make adequate precautionary measures against flooding in the rainy season (2013).
10. A motion requesting for the last quarter Virement Warrant 2014 for completion of some capital projects in Sokoto state.
11. Matter of urgent public importance with regards to the unconstitutional act of the withdrawal of security details attached to the Speaker of House of Representatives, Rt. Hon. Aminu Waziri Tambuwal, by the Presidency because of his defection from PDP to APC.

Regarding the last motion, when former Speaker Tambuwal defected from the then ruling party, the Peoples Democratic Party (PDP) to the opposition APC, the PDP-led Federal Government withdrew his security detail and sought to declare his seat vacant. In response to this, Abdussamad Dasuki raised a motion of urgent importance asking that the State House of Assembly condemn these, and, along with two other members, applied for a stay of proceedings in the court case against Tambuwal, seeking to be added as defendants and stating that the constituency cannot be without representation in the House of Representatives.

Tambuwal succeeded in retaining his position, and after he had decided to contest in the gubernatorial election, Dasuki sought to replace him.

=== House of Representatives ===
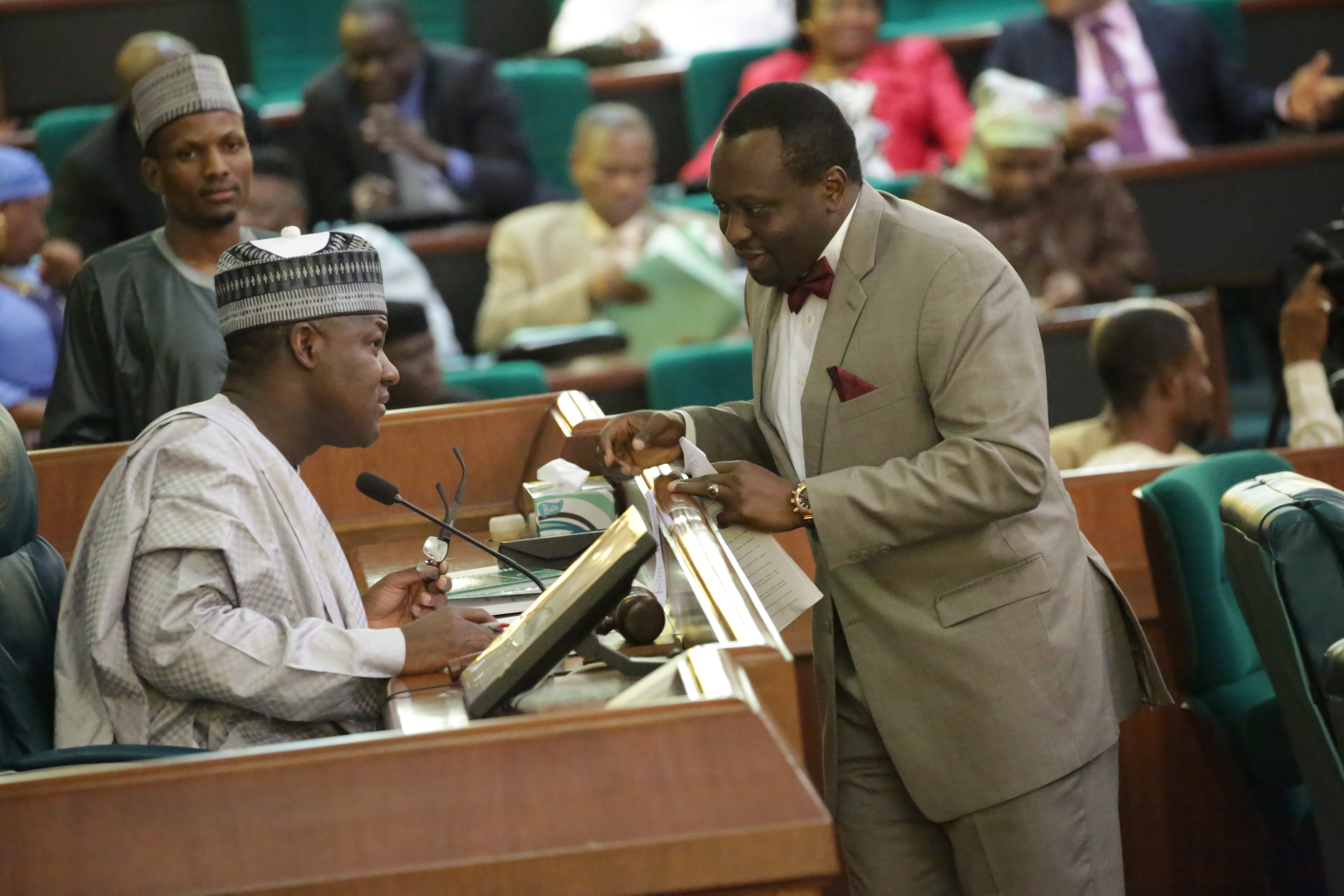
Abdussamad Dasuki with the Speaker of the House of Representatives, Rt. Hon. Yakubu Dogara during plenary.

On 7 December 2014, Abdussamad emerged as the candidate for the Kebbe/Tambuwal Federal Constituency at the APC primaries which held at Tambuwal stadium in Sokoto state, and went on to win with 70,653 votes at the polls in March 2015. Following his victory, a petition was filed against him by the defeated PDP candidate. The petition was eventually struck out in September 2015 for lack of merit.

He was sworn in as a Member of the House of Representatives on June 9, 2015, and in October 2015, he was appointed Chairman of the House Committee on Navy. His legislative interests include youth empowerment and rural development.

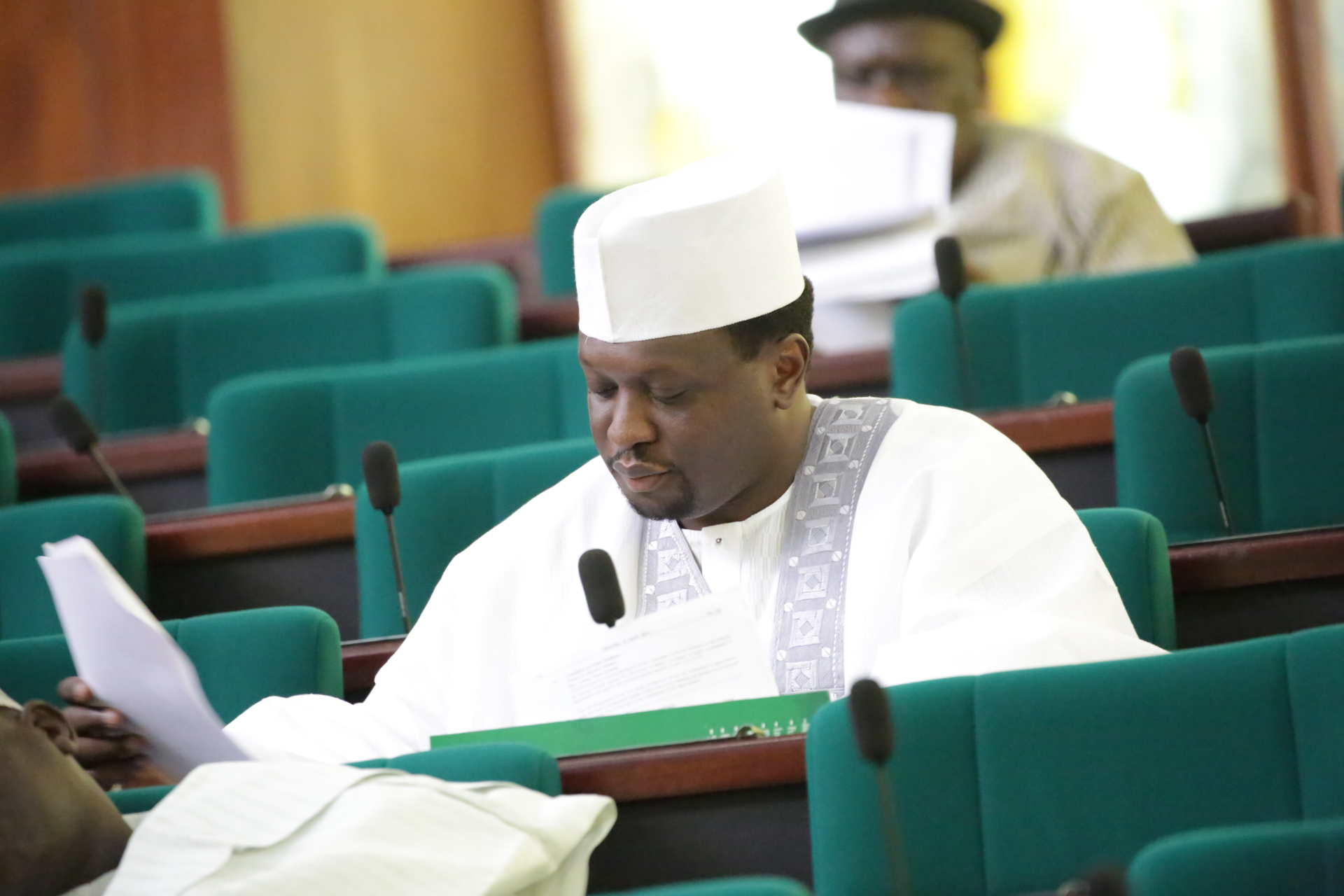
Abdussamad Dasuki during plenary

In February 2016, he was part of the delegation charged with the responsibility of resolving the crisis in the Kogi State House of Assembly, following the illegal impeachment of the Speaker and suspension of 14 others by nine members. In March 2016 – as one of the youngest members of the House of Representatives – he attended the Inter-Parliamentary Union (IPU) Global Conference of Young Parliamentarians in Lusaka, Zambia.

In May 2016, following an increment in the pump price of petrol, Abdussamad was also drafted into an ad hoc committee on the deregulation of the petroleum downstream sector, which was mandated to establish modalities for ending the strike embarked upon by the Nigerian Labour Congress (NLC).

==== Bills and motions ====
1. Co-sponsored the "Yes we can" bill, which seeks to amend the 1999 constitution of the Federal Republic of Nigeria to enhance political inclusion and participation of young people in governance in Nigeria by making it mandatory for at least one appointive position - aides, ministerial appointments, etc. - to be filled by a Nigerian below 35 years.
2. A Bill for an Act to Amend the Inland Fisheries Act (2004) to Review Upward the Penalties and for other related Matters.
3. A Bill for an Act to Amend the Nigerian Security and Civil Defense Corps Act (2003) to Provide Guidance for the Enforcement of Security Measures through the Requirement and Installation and Management of Close Circuit Television (CCTV) and for Other Matters Connected Therewith.
4. Amendment to a motion on the IDP crisis in the North-Eastern region, stating the need for the creation of a government agency similar to the Niger Delta Development Commission (NDDC) for the North East.
5. Raised a matter of urgent public importance seeking an end to a doctors' strike in Sokoto State.
6. Moved a motion on Public Accounts and the Central Bank of Nigeria (CBN), seeking that CBN declare any and all interests accruable to the Foreign Reserve Accounts of the Federation.
7. Motion on erosion in Dogon-Daji Local Government Area of Sokoto state.

=== Ministry of Finance, Sokoto State Government ===
In June 2019, Dasuki was named among the 26 nominees for the Sokoto State Cabinet by Governor Aminu Waziri Tambuwal. He was subsequently announced as Commissioner for Finance in the government, following his wealth of experience in both corporate and political roles, and as a trained economist.

== See also ==
- Yakubu Dogara
- Aminu Waziri Tambuwal
