= Umaru Dahiru =

Nigerian politician

Umaru Dahiru Tambuwal

Senator for Sokoto South
- Incumbent
- Assumed office 29 May 2007
- Preceded by: Abdallah M. Wali

Personal details
- Born: 12 June 1952 (age 73) Sokoto State, Nigeria

Umaru Dahiru Tambuwal (born 12 June 1952) was elected Senator for the Sokoto South constituency of Sokoto State, Nigeria, on the All Nigeria People's Party (ANPP) platform, taking office on 29 May 2003. He was reelected in 2007 as a member of the People's Democratic Party (PDP).

Dahiru obtained a B.Sc. in law from Ahmadu Bello University in Zaria and became a barrister at law. He became a company director, and in 1983 was appointed a Commissioner in Sokoto State. He was elected a member of the National Constitutional Conference in 1993 and was appointed to the Constitutional Drafting Committee in 1999.

After resuming his Senate seat in 2007, Dahiru was appointed to committees on Rules & Business, Judiciary, Human Rights & Legal Matters, Independent National Electoral Commission, Health and Aviation. In February 2008, he became the Chairman of the Northern Senators Forum. He replaced retired General John Shagaya. In a mid-term evaluation of Senators in May 2009, ThisDay noted that he had sponsored a bill to amend the National Human Rights Commission Act, had sponsored or co-sponsored five motions and contributed fairly incisively during debates in plenary.

In the 9 April 2011 national election, Dahiru retained his seat as Senator for Sokoto South. He gained 112,585 votes, followed in second place by Muhammad Sani Dogondaji of the Congress for Progressive Change (CPC) who won 36,682 votes.
