= Illela, Nigeria =

Illela
- LGA and town
- Motto: Illela Ta Amarawa Daji
- Interactive map of Illela
- Location within Nigeria
- Coordinates: 13°43′57″N 5°18′1″E
- Country: Nigeria
- State: Sokoto State

Government
  - Local Government Chairman: Sirajo Shehu Maibala

Area
  - Total: 1,246 km^{2} (481 sq mi)

Population (2006)
  - Total: 150,489
  - Density: 120.8/km^{2} (312.8/sq mi)
- Time zone: UTC+1 (WAT)
- 3-digit postal code prefix: 843
- ISO 3166 code: NG.SO.IL

Illela is a town and Local Government Area in Sokoto State, Nigeria.

Illela shares a border with the Republic of Niger to the north. It has an area of 1,246 km^{2} and a population of 150,489 at the 2006 census.

== Postal ==
The postal code of the area is 843.

== Climate ==
The average annual temperature in Illela, Nigeria, is 33.71 °C (92.68 °F), which is 4.25% warmer than the country's average. There are also 50.21 days with precipitation each year.

Climate change in Illela is indicated by trends in Wetter Precipitation, where total precipitation is rising.
