= Ahmed Muhammad Maccido =

Nigerian politician

Senator for Sokoto North
- Incumbent
- Assumed office 29 May 2007
- Preceded by: Badamasi Maccido

Personal details
- Born: 1 April 1964 (age 61) Sokoto State, Nigeria

Ahmed Muhammad Maccido (born 1 April 1964) was elected Senator for the Sokoto North constituency of Sokoto State, Nigeria, taking office on 29 May 2007. He is a member of the People's Democratic Party (PDP).

Maccido is the son of the late Sultan Muhammadu Maccido. Prior to being elected to the Senate, Maccido was Commissioner for Agriculture in Sokoto State. After taking his seat in the Senate, he was appointed to committees on Navy, Marine Transport, Inter-Parliamentary Affairs, Housing, Federal Character & Inter-Government Affairs and Banking, Insurance & Other Financial Institutions. Later he was appointed vice-chairman of the Senate Committee on Appropriation. In a mid-term evaluation of Senators in May 2009, ThisDay said he had not sponsored any bill in the last year and had contributed little to plenary debates.

Maccido ran for reelection as Senator for Sokoto North in the 26 April 2011 election. He won with 154,932 votes, ahead of 18 other candidates.
