= Muktar Shagari =

Nigerian politician

Mukhtar Shehu Shagari

Federal Minister of Water Resources
- In office 13 June 2001 – 10 January 2007
- Preceded by: Mohammed Kaliel
- Succeeded by: Adamu Bello

Deputy Governor of Sokoto State
- In office 29 May 2007 – 10 April 2011

Deputy Governor of Sokoto State
- In office 27 May 2011 – 29 May 2015

Personal details
- Born: 26 December 1956 (age 69) Shagari, Sokoto State, Nigeria

Barrister Mukhtar Shehu Shagari, CFR (born 26 December 1956) was appointed Nigerian Minister of Water Resources in a June 2001 reshuffle of the cabinet of President Olusegun Obasanjo. He was later appointed President of the African Ministers Council On Water (AMCOW). Shagari held office until January 2007 when he left to compete for Deputy Governor of Sokoto State. He was elected Deputy Governor of Sokoto State in April 2007, and after a legal challenge was reelected in May 2008.

== Background ==
Shagari is the nephew of former president Shehu Shagari. He was born in the town of Shagari, Sokoto State in 1956. He attended Kanta College, Argungu until 1974, and the College of Arts and Science, now the University of Maiduguri (1974–1976). He attended Ahmadu Bello University, Zaria (1976–1979) and earned an LLB degree, and the Nigeria Law School (1979–1980), when he was called to the bar.

After national service in Port Harcourt, Rivers State he worked in the magistrate court, then served as state counsel to the Ministry of Justice, Sokoto State. He was then appointed as Sokoto State Attorney General and Commissioner of Justice. Shagari later set up a private legal practice. During the Nigerian Second Republic, he was legal adviser to the National Party of Nigeria in Sokoto State. He was a member of the Sokoto State branch of the National Republican Convention in the Nigerian Third Republic, disbanded in November 1993 when General Sani Abacha came to power. In the lead-up to the return of democracy in 1999, he was legal advisor to the People's Democratic Party (PDP) in Sokoto State.

== Minister of Water Resources ==
Shagari was appointed minister of Water Resources in June 2001. In December 2001, Shagari signed contracts for the N4.9 billion Hadeijah Valley Irrigation Project in Jigawa State and for the N468 million Egbe/Little Ose water supply project. In April 2002, Shagari became the president of the African Ministerial Council on Water. In the same month, Federal Government announced that 1,400 water projects across Nigeria had been revoked. Shagari said that the decision to revoke contracts was because several of the contracts were awarded to individuals, rather than to companies. In August 2002 Shagari spoke out against move to impeach President Obasanjo, supporting the President's record to date.

In August 2003, the African Development Bank announced that it was cancelling 80% of its projects in Nigeria due to corruption and misuse of funds, but that the recipients were still liable to repay loans disbursed for these projects. Reacting, Shagari told Nigerian officials to put the interests of the people before their own interests. He said the government was now placing priority on small dams. The same month, Shagari gave the Ogun-Osun River Basin Authority the go-ahead to start rehabilitation of the Oyan dam. He also noted that the Abeokuta-Ota Water schemes would soon be completed. In October 2003 Shagari announced that the Federal Government had approved N10.7 billion for water projects across the country. He said the government had completed 2,500 water projects nationwide, but about 195 other water projects were still under construction.

In February 2004, Shagari said that an N677 million contract awarded to a Korean company in May 2002 to build the Inkari Dam in Akwa Ibom State had been transferred to a Nigerian company. The Koreans, who moved to site in January 2003, had been deported. The N191 million contract for the Sabke Dam in Katsina State had also been transferred, and the project was near completion. In May 2005 Shagari said the Federal Government had spent over N180 billion on water supply from 1999 to the end of 2004, and water supply coverage had increased in this period from 35% to almost 65%. Shagari retained his ministry in a major cabinet shake-up in July 2005. In September 2005, Obasanjo wrote a commendation letter to Shagari in which he said minister had demonstrated humility, vision and patriotism in ensuring that communities across the country gained potable water. In October 2005 Shagari accepted a free-aid offer from China to help Nigeria to drill 598 boreholes in Abuja and 18 states.

In January 2006, former Lagos State police commissioner Abubakar Tsav claimed that the authorities had embezzled N240 million given to Benue State to improve water supply in Makurdi. Shagari said the allegation was unfounded. In June 2006, Shagari said the government had surpassed the Millennium Development Goals target for water supply by about 10%. In a cabinet reshuffle on 10 January 2007, Shagari was released to run for Governor of Sokoto State in the April 2007 elections, and his ministry was merged into the Ministry of Agriculture and Water Resources under Adamu Bello.

== Deputy Governor of Sokoto State ==
Shagari was nominated by the People's Democratic Party (PDP) as its gubernatorial candidate for Sokoto State in the 2007 elections. He polled 2,701 votes while the two other contestants polled 447 and 431 votes. However, after Aliyu Magatakarda Wamakko, who had been nominated as candidate for the All Nigeria Peoples Party (ANPP), crossed over to the PDP before the election, the PDP ruled that Shagari should run for Deputy Governor in partnership with Wamakko. In April 2008, the Court of Appeal in Kaduna nullified the election of Wamakko and Shagari on the basis of irregularities in the registration process due to the last-minute changes. After a re-run of the election, Wamakko and Shagari were reinstated in May 2008.

In April 2010, there were reports that former president Olusegun Obasanjo was pushing to have Shagari appointed vice-president to acting president Goodluck Jonathan, who had taken over after the extended illness of President Umaru Yar'Adua. Other sources said that Shagari was Obasanjo's back-up choice after Adamu Bello of Adamawa State.
