= List of governors of Sokoto State =

Governor of Sokoto
- State flag of Sokoto State
- Incumbent; Ahmad Aliyu since 29 May 2023
- Term length: Maximum of two four-year terms
- Website: sokotostate.gov.ng

This is a list of administrators and governors of Sokoto State, Nigeria, which was formed on 3 February 1976 when North-Western State was split into Niger and Sokoto states.

Name	Title	Took office	Left office	Party	Notes
Alhaji Usman Faruk	Governor	1967	1975	Military	Commissioner of Police, Governor of Northwestern State
Colonel Umaru Mohammed	Governor	March 1976	July 1978	Military	
Lt. Colonel Gado Nasko	Governor	July 1978	October 1979	Military	
Shehu Kangiwa	Governor	October 1979	November 1981	NPN	
Garba Nadama	Governor	1982	December 1983	NPN	
Colonel Garba Duba	Governor	January 1984	August 1985	Military	
Colonel Garba Mohammed	Governor	August 1985	December 1987	Military	
Colonel Ahmed Muhammad Daku	Governor	December 1987	August 1990	Military	
Colonel Bashir Salihi Magashi	Governor	August 1990	January 1992	Military	
Malam Yahaya Abdulkarim	Governor	January 1992	November 1993	NRC	
Colonel Yakubu Mu'azu	Administrator	9 December 1993	22 August 1996	Military	
Navy Captain Rasheed Adisa Raji	Administrator	22 August 1996	August 1998	Military	
Group Captain (Air Force) Rufai Garba	Administrator	August 1998	May 1999	Military	
Attahiru Bafarawa	Governor	29 May 1999	29 May 2007	APP; ANPP	
Aliyu Magatakarda Wamakko	Governor	29 May 2007	11 April 2008	PDP	
Abdullahi Balarabe Salame	Acting Governor	11 April 2008	28 May 2008	-	
Aliyu Magatakarda Wamakko	Governor	28 May 2008	28 May 2011	PDP	Mohammed Zayyana Acting Governor 2012 to 2012
Aliyu Magatakarda Wamakko	Governor	28 May 2012	28 May 2015	APC	
Aminu Waziri Tambuwal	Governor	28 May 2015	29 May 2023	APC/PDP	
Ahmad Aliyu	Governor	29 May 2023	Incumbent	APC	

== See also ==
- States of Nigeria
- List of state governors of Nigeria
