= Attahiru Bafarawa =

Nigerian politician

Attahiru Dalhatu Bafarawa
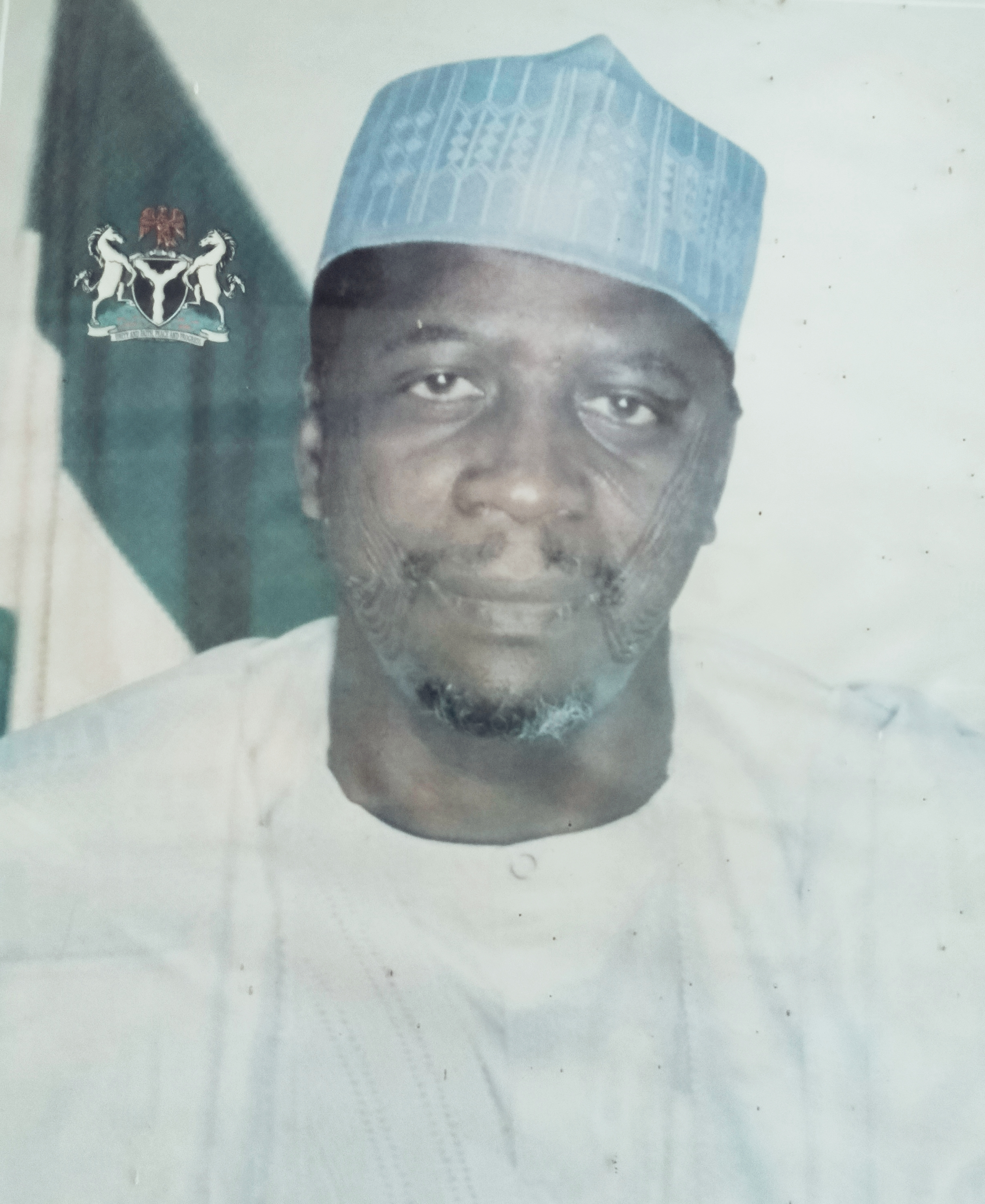

Governor of Sokoto State
- In office 29 May 1999 – 29 May 2007
- Preceded by: Rufai Garba
- Succeeded by: Aliyu Magatakarda Wamakko

Personal details
- Born: 4 November 1954 (age 71)

Alhaji Attahiru Dalhatu Bafarawa (born 4 November 1954) is a Nigerian politician who served as the executive governor of Sokoto State from 29 May 1999 to 29 May 2007.

== Early career ==
He was a one-time local government councillor in charge of education. In 1979, he ran unsuccessfully for election to the House of Representatives on the platform of the Great Nigeria Peoples Party (GNPP). He was a member of the National Constitutional Conference of 1994–1995, during the military rule of Sani Abacha. He was a founding member of the United Nigeria Congress Party (UNCP) in 1997 and the All People's Party (APP) in 1998.

== Governor of Sokoto State ==
In 1999, Bafarawa was elected governor of Sokoto State on the platform of the All Nigeria Peoples Party (ANPP), and was re-elected for the ANPP in 2003. In March 2002, a Sharia court in Sokoto State freed a 35-year-old woman Safiya Hussaini, who had been sentenced to death by stoning after being found guilty of adultery. Nigeria's justice minister declared Sharia as unconstitutional. Bafarawa, however, said the Sharia states would not adhere to this declaration.

Under the Bafarawa administration the state made significant improvements in the quality of roads. Schools were upgraded, and enrolment greatly improved due to assurances that all pupils would be taught morals and Islamic religion.

== Later career ==
Bafarawa founded the Democratic People's Party (DPP) and became its presidential candidate at the 2007 presidential elections in Nigeria. As presidential candidate, while meeting with officials of the US State Department in Washington, D.C., he promised to scrap the Niger Delta Development Commission (NDDC) if elected, describing the commission as "a conduit of corruption and waste." On 30 April 2024, Bafarawa while meeting with journalists in his home state of Sokoto, said he would neither contest for elective positions or accept any political appointments in the future, stressing that he had been in active politics for 40 years and it was time to leave the stage for younger people. On 13 January 2025, he resigned from the Peoples Democratic Party (PDP) through a letter addressed to the party executives, stating that he wanted to focus more on programs that inspire young people.
