= Aliyu Magatakarda Wamakko =

Nigerian politician

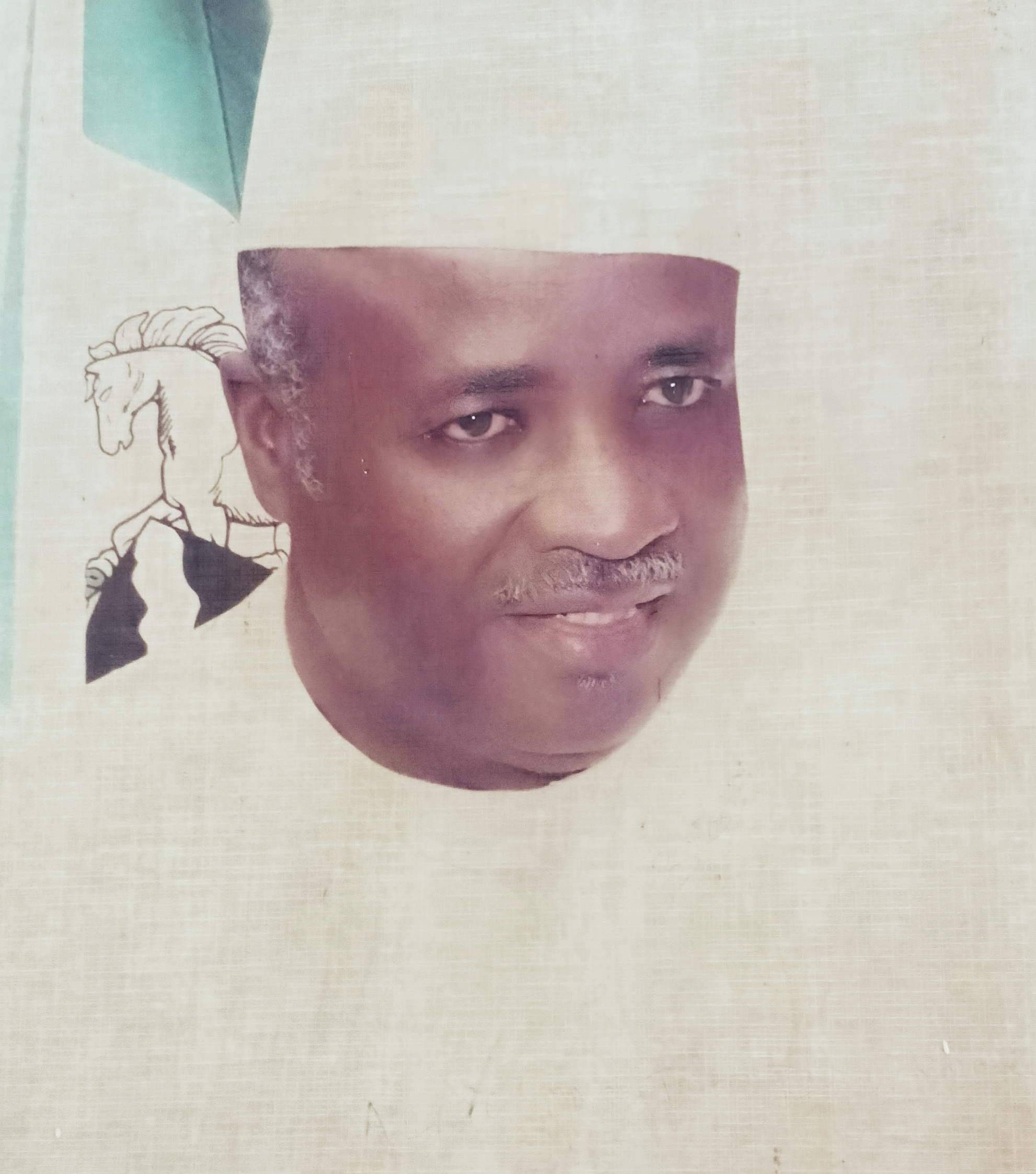

Governor of Sokoto State
- In office 29 May 2007 – 29 May 2015
- Preceded by: Attahiru Bafarawa
- Succeeded by: Aminu Waziri Tambuwal

Personal details
- Born: 1 March 1953 (age 73) Wamakko, Sokoto State, Nigeria
- Party: APC

Aliyu Magatakarda Wamakko (born 1 March 1953) is a Nigerian politician who served as governor of Sokoto State, between 2007 and 2015.

== Background ==
Wamakko was born on 1 March 1953 in Wamakko, Sokoto State. He spent five years (1968-1972) at the Sokoto Teachers' College. After graduation, he worked as a teacher from 1973 to 1977 before being admitted to the University of Pittsburgh in the United States. He graduated with a B.Sc. in August 1980. Returning to Nigeria, he taught at Sokoto Teachers College.

Wamakko took a job as Principal Assistant Secretary of Zurmi Local Government Area (LGA), later being promoted to Acting Secretary. He worked at Kaura Namoda LGA, and was appointed Chairman of the Sokoto LGA from 1986-1987. He became General Manager, Hotel Management and Tourism Board, Sokoto. In March 1992, he was promoted to Director-General, Careers and Special Services, Governor's Office, Sokoto in March 1992. He was elected Deputy Governor of Sokoto State to Governor Attahiru Bafarawa in 1999, on the platform of the All Nigeria Peoples Party (ANPP). He was re-elected Deputy Governor for a second term in April 2003. He resigned as Deputy Governor of Sokoto State on 15 March 2006.

== Governor of Sokoto State ==
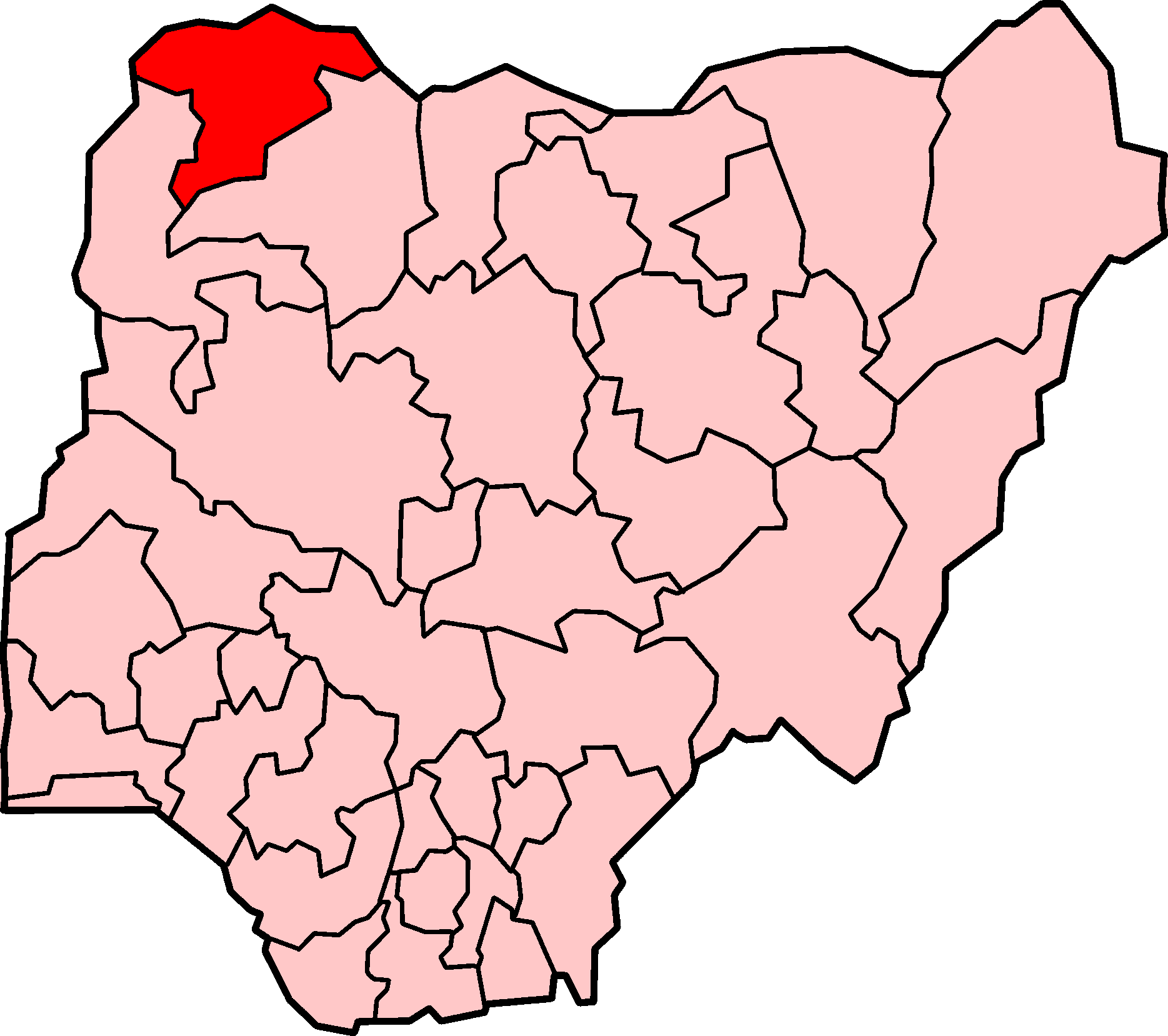
Location of Sokoto State in Nigeria

Wamakko ran successfully for Governor of Sokoto State in April 2007 on the Peoples Democratic Party (PDP) platform, and assumed office on 29 May 2007. Following an appeal, his election was annulled in April 2008 on the basis that he had still been a member of the All Nigeria Peoples Party (ANPP) when he won the PDP nomination. Abdullahi Balarabe Salame was appointed Acting Governor (11 April - 28 May 2008) while a re-run was arranged. It was said that the contest was not so much between Wamakko and Muhammadu Maigari Dingyadi of the DPP, as between Wamakko and his predecessor Attahiru Bafarawa, founder of DPP. Wamakko regained his seat in the May 2008 re-run. His main opponent claimed that the election was rigged and said he would appeal to the courts.

In 2007, Wamakko launched the State Poverty Reduction Agency (SPORA) to run programs such as the youth skills acquisition program. In September 2009, he pleaded for patience over 2,000 housing units nearing completion, saying they were meant for the people of the state, are limited and cannot even go round. He also stated that the state government would not establish a Micro-finance bank or industries, but would support any individual who wish to do so.

In October 2009, the Sokoto State Commissioner of Justice said that the state was about to prosecute Wamakko's predecessor Attahiru Bafarawa and five others for alleged misappropriation of N2.919 billion. Bafarawa said the Sokoto commission of inquiry had been set up by Wamakko solely in order to discredit him. He said that Wamakko was his deputy whom the House nearly removed for corrupt tendencies, and that "If there were such illegal deductions and withdrawals, he should be in a better position to answer for them." Bafarawa asked the commission to invite Wamakko to testify so that certain issues could be clarified, but his request was refused on the ground that to do so was beyond the commission's mandate.

== See also ==
- List of governors of Sokoto State
