= 2023 Nigerian presidential election in Sokoto State =

- 25 February 2023
- Registered: 2,172,056
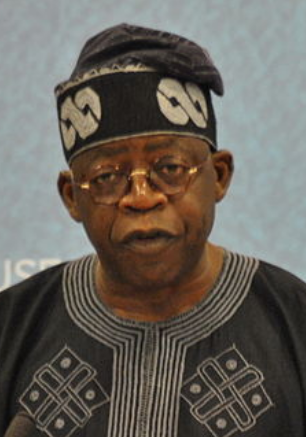

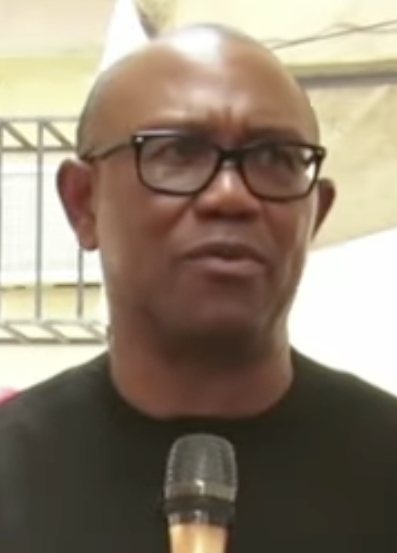

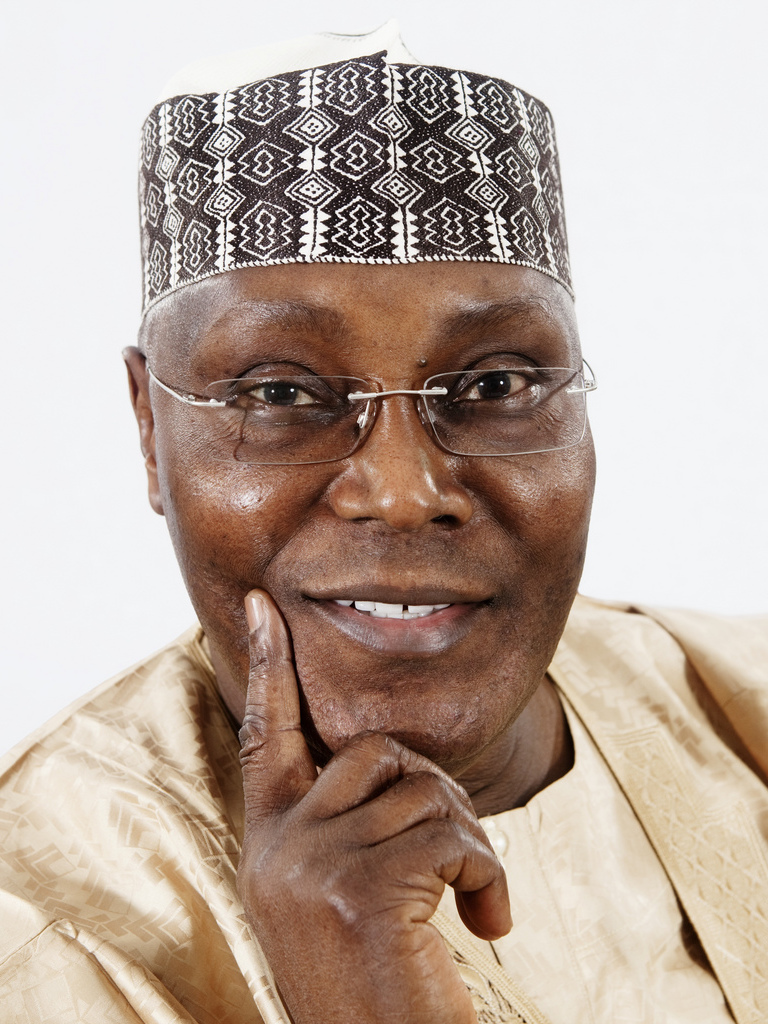
Nominee	Bola Tinubu	Peter Obi
Party	APC	LP
Home state	Lagos	Anambra
Running mate	Kashim Shettima	Yusuf Datti Baba-Ahmed
Nominee	Rabiu Kwankwaso	Atiku Abubakar
Party	New Nigeria Peoples Party	PDP
Home state	Kano	Adamawa
Running mate	Isaac Idahosa	Ifeanyi Okowa
President before election
Muhammadu Buhari
APC
Elected President
TBD

The 2023 Nigerian presidential election in Sokoto State was held on 25 February 2023 as part of the nationwide 2023 Nigerian presidential election to elect the president and vice president of Nigeria. Other federal elections, including elections to the House of Representatives and the Senate, were also held on the same date while state elections were held two weeks afterward on 11 March 2023.

== Background ==
Sokoto State is a large northwestern state with agricultural and energy potential but facing a debilitated health sector, low education rates, and intense challenges in security as the nationwide kidnapping epidemic, bandit conflict, religious riots, and herder–farmer clashes have all heavily affected the state.

Politically, the 2019 elections were categorized as a swing back towards the PDP. Although Buhari won the state again (by 15%), Sokoto was the state that swung the most towards the PDP in the presidential election; legislatively, the PDP held its one Senate seat after a court ruling and won four House of Representatives seats after the APC won all legislative seats in 2015. Statewise, incumbent Governor Aminu Tambuwal won re-election by about 300 votes while the APC won a narrow majority in the House of Assembly.

== Polling ==
Polling organisation/client	Fieldwork date	Sample size					Others	Undecided	Undisclosed	Not voting
Polling organisation/client	Fieldwork date	Sample size	Tinubu APC	Obi LP	Kwankwaso NNPP	Abubakar PDP	Others	Undecided	Undisclosed	Not voting
BantuPage	December 2022	N/A	32%	4%	2%	30%	–	23%	5%	3%
Nextier (Sokoto crosstabs of national poll)	27 January 2023	N/A	18.2%	5.2%	9.1%	18.2%	–	6.5%	–	–
SBM Intelligence for EiE (Sokoto crosstabs of national poll)	22 January-6 February 2023	N/A	16%	38%	5%	23%	6%	11%	–	–

== Projections ==
Source	Projection		As of
Africa Elects (Note: Africa Elects projections predict the likelihood of a candidate winning a state by categorizing a state as "Safe" for exceedingly likely, "Likely" for somewhat likely, and "Lean" for least likely. If no clear determination could be made, states are categorized as "tossups".)	Likely Abubakar		24 February 2023
Dataphyte (Note: Dataphyte projections predict candidates' projected votal shares in each state.)
Dataphyte	Tinubu:	28.49%	11 February 2023
Dataphyte	Obi:	8.32%	11 February 2023
Dataphyte	Abubakar:	56.89%	11 February 2023
Dataphyte	Others:	6.31%	11 February 2023
Enough is Enough- SBM Intelligence (Note: EiE-SBM projections predict which candidates will win states.)	Abubakar		17 February 2023
SBM Intelligence (Note: SBM projections predict which candidates will win states or, if no determination could be made, categorizes states as "Too close to call" (TCC).)	Abubakar		15 December 2022
ThisDay (Note: ThisDay projections predict candidates' projected votal shares in each state.)
ThisDay	Tinubu:	35%	27 December 2022
ThisDay	Obi:	–	27 December 2022
ThisDay	Kwankwaso:	15%	27 December 2022
ThisDay	Abubakar:	40%	27 December 2022
ThisDay	Others/Undecided:	10%	27 December 2022
The Nation (Note: The Nation projections predict which candidates will win states or, if no determination could be made, categorizes states as "Battlegrounds.")	Battleground		12-19 February 2023

== General election ==
=== Results ===
2023 Nigerian presidential election in Sokoto State
Party	Candidate	Votes	%
A	Christopher Imumolen		
AA	Hamza al-Mustapha		
ADP	Yabagi Sani		
APP	Osita Nnadi		
AAC	Omoyele Sowore		
ADC	Dumebi Kachikwu		
APC	Bola Tinubu		
APGA	Peter Umeadi		
APM	Princess Chichi Ojei		
BP	Sunday Adenuga		
LP	Peter Obi		
NRM	Felix Johnson Osakwe		
New Nigeria Peoples Party	Rabiu Kwankwaso		
PRP	Kola Abiola		
PDP	Atiku Abubakar		
SDP	Adewole Adebayo		
YPP	Malik Ado-Ibrahim		
ZLP	Dan Nwanyanwu		
Total votes			100.00%
Invalid or blank votes			N/A
Turnout			

==== By senatorial district ====
The results of the election by senatorial district.

Senatorial District	Bola Tinubu APC		Atiku Abubakar PDP		Peter Obi LP		Rabiu Kwankwaso NNPP		Others		Total valid votes
Senatorial District	Votes	%	Votes	%	Votes	%	Votes	%	Votes	%	Total valid votes
Sokoto East Senatorial District (Note: Comprising the local government areas of Gada, Goronyo, Gwadabawa, Illela, Isa, Rabah, Sabon Birni, and Wurno.)	TBD	%	TBD	%	TBD	%	TBD	%	TBD	%	TBD
Sokoto North Senatorial District (Note: Comprising the local government areas of Binji, Gudu, Kware, Silame, Sokoto North, Sokoto South, Tangaza, and Wamako.)	TBD	%	TBD	%	TBD	%	TBD	%	TBD	%	TBD
Sokoto South Senatorial District (Note: Comprising the local government areas of Bodinga, Dange Shuni, Kebbe, Shagari, Tambuwal, Tureta, and Yabo.)	TBD	%	TBD	%	TBD	%	TBD	%	TBD	%	TBD
Totals	TBD	%	TBD	%	TBD	%	TBD	%	TBD	%	TBD

==== By federal constituency ====
The results of the election by federal constituency.

Federal Constituency	Bola Tinubu APC		Atiku Abubakar PDP		Peter Obi LP		Rabiu Kwankwaso NNPP		Others		Total valid votes
Federal Constituency	Votes	%	Votes	%	Votes	%	Votes	%	Votes	%	Total valid votes
Binji/Silame Federal Constituency (Note: Comprising the local government areas of Binji and Silame.)	TBD	%	TBD	%	TBD	%	TBD	%	TBD	%	TBD
Dange-Shuni/Bodinga/Tureta Federal Constituency (Note: Comprising the local government areas of Bodinga, Dange Shuni, and Tureta.)	TBD	%	TBD	%	TBD	%	TBD	%	TBD	%	TBD
Goronyo/Gada Federal Constituency (Note: Comprising the local government areas of Gada and Goronyo.)	TBD	%	TBD	%	TBD	%	TBD	%	TBD	%	TBD
Illela/Gwadabawa Federal Constituency (Note: Comprising the local government areas of Gwadabawa and Illela.)	TBD	%	TBD	%	TBD	%	TBD	%	TBD	%	TBD
Isa/Sabon Birni Federal Constituency (Note: Comprising the local government areas of Isa and Sabon Birni.)	TBD	%	TBD	%	TBD	%	TBD	%	TBD	%	TBD
Kebbe/Tambuwal Federal Constituency (Note: Comprising the local government areas of Kebbe and Tambuwal.)	TBD	%	TBD	%	TBD	%	TBD	%	TBD	%	TBD
Kware/Wamakko Federal Constituency (Note: Comprising the local government areas of Kware and Wamako.)	TBD	%	TBD	%	TBD	%	TBD	%	TBD	%	TBD
Sokoto North/Sokoto South Federal Constituency (Note: Comprising the local government areas of Sokoto North and Sokoto South.)	TBD	%	TBD	%	TBD	%	TBD	%	TBD	%	TBD
Tangaza/Gudu Federal Constituency (Note: Comprising the local government areas of Gudu and Tangaza.)	TBD	%	TBD	%	TBD	%	TBD	%	TBD	%	TBD
Wurno/Rabah Federal Constituency (Note: Comprising the local government areas of Rabah and Wurno.)	TBD	%	TBD	%	TBD	%	TBD	%	TBD	%	TBD
Yabo/Shagari Federal Constituency (Note: Comprising the local government areas of Shagari and Yabo.)	TBD	%	TBD	%	TBD	%	TBD	%	TBD	%	TBD
Totals	TBD	%	TBD	%	TBD	%	TBD	%	TBD	%	TBD

==== By local government area ====
The results of the election by local government area.

Local government area	Bola Tinubu APC		Atiku Abubakar PDP		Peter Obi LP		Rabiu Kwankwaso NNPP		Others		Total valid votes	Turnout (%)
Local government area	Votes	%	Votes	%	Votes	%	Votes	%	Votes	%	Total valid votes	Turnout (%)
Binji	TBD	%	TBD	%	TBD	%	TBD	%	TBD	%	TBD	%
Bodinga	TBD	%	TBD	%	TBD	%	TBD	%	TBD	%	TBD	%
Dange Shuni	TBD	%	TBD	%	TBD	%	TBD	%	TBD	%	TBD	%
Gada	TBD	%	TBD	%	TBD	%	TBD	%	TBD	%	TBD	%
Goronyo	TBD	%	TBD	%	TBD	%	TBD	%	TBD	%	TBD	%
Gudu	TBD	%	TBD	%	TBD	%	TBD	%	TBD	%	TBD	%
Gwadabawa	TBD	%	TBD	%	TBD	%	TBD	%	TBD	%	TBD	%
Illela	TBD	%	TBD	%	TBD	%	TBD	%	TBD	%	TBD	%
Isa	TBD	%	TBD	%	TBD	%	TBD	%	TBD	%	TBD	%
Kebbe	TBD	%	TBD	%	TBD	%	TBD	%	TBD	%	TBD	%
Kware	TBD	%	TBD	%	TBD	%	TBD	%	TBD	%	TBD	%
Rabah	TBD	%	TBD	%	TBD	%	TBD	%	TBD	%	TBD	%
Sabon Birni	TBD	%	TBD	%	TBD	%	TBD	%	TBD	%	TBD	%
Shagari	TBD	%	TBD	%	TBD	%	TBD	%	TBD	%	TBD	%
Silame	TBD	%	TBD	%	TBD	%	TBD	%	TBD	%	TBD	%
Sokoto North	TBD	%	TBD	%	TBD	%	TBD	%	TBD	%	TBD	%
Sokoto South	TBD	%	TBD	%	TBD	%	TBD	%	TBD	%	TBD	%
Tambuwal	TBD	%	TBD	%	TBD	%	TBD	%	TBD	%	TBD	%
Tangaza	TBD	%	TBD	%	TBD	%	TBD	%	TBD	%	TBD	%
Tureta	TBD	%	TBD	%	TBD	%	TBD	%	TBD	%	TBD	%
Wamako	TBD	%	TBD	%	TBD	%	TBD	%	TBD	%	TBD	%
Wurno	TBD	%	TBD	%	TBD	%	TBD	%	TBD	%	TBD	%
Yabo	TBD	%	TBD	%	TBD	%	TBD	%	TBD	%	TBD	%
Totals	TBD	%	TBD	%	TBD	%	TBD	%	TBD	%	TBD	%

== See also ==
- 2023 Sokoto State elections
- 2023 Nigerian presidential election
