= List of villages in Sokoto State =

This is a list of villages and settlements in Sokoto State, Nigeria organised by local government area (LGA) and district/area (with postal codes also given).

== By postal code ==
LGA	District / Area	Postal code	Villages
Binji	Binji	853101	Binji; Bunkari; Gwazzai; Inname; Jamali; Maikulki; S/Gabas; S/Yamma; Samama
Bodinga	Bodinga	852101	Bodinga; Degel; Garko; Kaura-Minyo; Mazar Gari; Toma
Bodinga	Dingyadi	853104	Badawa; Dingyadi; Kulafassa; Tulluwa
Bodinga	Sifawa	852103	Badau; Bindin; Danguibi; Dankurmi; Lukuyawa; S/Birn; Sifawa
Dange/Shuni	Dange	852106	Ba'olere; Bakwandi; Bisilan; Bodai; Budude; Bulujiri; Bungi; Dali; Dange; Fajallu; G/Kare; Galma; Gidan Ratsau; Hausare; Helele; Himasa; Jurga; Radama; Rakwandi; Salau; Sokwando; Wababe; Wahabi
Dange/Shuni	Shuni	852107	Adarawa; Amanawa; B/Hausawa; Bata; Bayo; Danbarunji; Danbua; Dilungu; Duma; Gajara; Galankawa; Geera; Gidado; K/Kimba; Kadabali; Kwanawa; Kwanbi; Lofa; Luga; Lungu; Majebela; Makera; Monde; R/Konduna; Rahen Ali; Rekina; Rudu; Runjin Man; Sabaru; Shuni; Tsafanade; Tsamiya; Tsefe; Tuntobe
Gada	Gada	843102	Duka Maje; Gada; Gilbadi; Holai; Ilah; Bigal; Gidan Fako; Gidan mani; Banqas; Ingabura; K/ Buda; Kadadi; Kadassaka; Kaddi; Kaffa; Kiri; Kwarma; Kyadawa; Madawa; R/doma; Sagira; Tsitse; Wauru
Goronyo	Goronyo	842105	Awakkala; Birjingo; Boyakai; Danasakko; Giyawa; Goronyo; Kagara; Kojiyo; Kwakwazo; Rimawa; S/G-dole; Shinaka; Takakume; Tsolawo; Yarimawa; Z. Sabara
Gudu	Gudu	841102	Awalkiti; Bachaka; Balle; Boto; Chillas; Gwazanye; Jurga; K/Chana; K/Sarki; Kurdula; Makaya; Makwa; Marken-Bori; Salau; Tsafanade; Tulun-Doya; Wababi
Gwadabawa	Gwadabawa	843103	Alela; Asara; Asara Arewa; Attakwanyo; Bamana; Chancha; Chimmola; Dan Abba; Gidan Kaya; Gigane; Huchi; Mammande; Manmansuka; Meli; T/Shanu; Tudun Doki; Tambagarka; Wodai; Zugana
Gwadabawa	Salame	843103	Abdalon-Salame; Bakanta; Tayyamane; Bingga; Dabuwasa; Bati; Tungan Maikomo; Gobiro; Mayal; Here; Yar Tunga; Kubudawa; Jilliki; Tungan Makera; Tungan Jijje; Munlela; Dan abba; Dangero;Darna-Kilya; Illela-Baraya; Kiliya; Kola; Jema; Mammande; Zugana; Tungar Zaki;
Illela	Illela	843101	Abarura; Araba; D/Salau; Damba; Dango; Dauna; G/Katta; Gadan; Garu; Gidan Hamma; Illela; Kalmalo; Ketti; R/Gatti; Sabon Gari; Tarke; Tozai; Tsolawa
Isa	Isa	883101	Bafarawa; Bargaja; Gebe; Gidan Bawa; Gidan Dikko; Isa; Kurar Mota; Modaci; Rijia Mallam Ladan; Shalla; Tiddibale; Tozai; Tsabare; Turba; Yanfako
Kebbe	Kebbe	850105	Budun; Dukura; Fakku; Garaci; Girkau; Gwandi; Jabga; Kebbe; Kuchi; Margai; Matseri; Nasa-Gudu; San gi; Ungushi; Zugu
Kware	Durbawa	841105	Kasara; T|mallamawa; Tsaki; Turanka
Kware	Hamma Ali	841104	Bargeni; Dundaye; G/Akwara; G/Buba; G/Danga; G/Gabas; G/Hamidu; G/Kaya; G/Modibbo; G/Ruga; G/Yaro; Galaduntse; Gandu; Gumborawa; Hadarawa; Marabawa; R/Samiya
Kware	Kware	841103	Bankanu; Basansan R/Kade; Gunduga; K/kede; Kalalawa; Kware
Kware	Saki	841107	Gebawa; Lambo; Saki; Walakai; Zamau
Kware	Umaruma	841106	Bassan San; Gidan Akura; Hausawa; More; R/limma; Sirijallu; Ummaruma
Rabah	Gandi	842104	Gandi; Gundumar-Bunu; Kurya; Tsamiya; Yar Tsakuwa
Rabah	Rabah	842103	Baraya Zaki; G/Buwai; Galadima; Gawa Kuke; Goddodi; Gundumar-Riji; Mai Kujara; Rabah; Rarah; Tofa; Tursa; Yari-Gwaddadi
Sabon Birni	Sabon Birni	842106	Gangara; Gatawa; Kalgo; Kukawa; Lajinga; Makuwana; Sabon Birni; Tara; Tsamaye; U/Lalle
Shagari	Shagari	851103	Aggur; Bulanyaki; Doruwa; Gangam; Kajiji; Lambara; Lungu; Mandera; Rugga; Sanyinnawal; Shagari; Tunya dole
Silame	Silame	853102	Gande; Katami; Kubodu; Labani; Maji; Marafa
Sokoto North	Sokoto	840101	Adar Kwanni; Dandi; Karaye; Mabara Kanti Sani; Mabera Idi; Mabera Mujaya; Magajin-Gari; Magajin-Rafi; Mana; Rujin Sambo; Sabon Birni; Salami; Sarkin Musullumi; Ungwar Jariri
Sokoto South	Sokoto	840101	Gagi; Rijiyar Dorowa; Sarkin Zamfara; Tudun-Wada
Tambuwal	Dogon Daji	850102	Bancho; Barkeji; Dogon-Daji; Gambu; Nabaguda; Sabawa; Salah; Shabra
Tambuwal	Gindi	850106	Bakaya; Barga; Danmadi; Gindi; Kaya; Madacci
Tambuwal	Jabo	850103	Barkini; Chakai; Jabo; Kagara; Modo
Tambuwal	Sanyinna	850104	Garam; Goshe; Gudum; Saidah; Sanyinna
Tambuwal	Tambuwal	850101	Alasan; Bagida; Bashire; Dogon Marke; Faga; Ganuwa; Garba Magaji; Kaura Salihu; Lukingo; Maikada; Moradun; Shimfiri; Tambawal; Yagawal; Zomawa
Tangaza	Tangaza	841101	Gidan Madi; Gongono; Gurdam; Kalanjeni; Kwachehuro; Magonho; Raka; Ruwan Wuri; Sakkwai; Salewa; Suti; Tangaza
Tureta	Tureta	352105	Bimasa; Bimasa Lofa; Dorawa; Duma Nasarawa; Fura-Girke; G/kare; Kawara; Kuruwa; Kwarare; Ruga Budda; Tureta
Wamako	Dundaye	840104	Dundaye; Gidan Buba; Gidan Hamidu; Gidan Kaya; Gidan Yaro; Gumborawa
Wamako	Gumbi	840103	Gumbi; Kalambaina; Kasarawa; Wajake
Wamako	Wamako	840102	Gedawa; Gwamatse; K/Kimba; Kamatta; Kaura Kamba; Wammako
Wurno	Achida	842102	Achida; Alkanmu; G/Bango; Gyalgyal; Kwasare; Lalodu; Sisawa
Wurno	Wurno	842101	Adakela; Chacho; Dankemu; Dinawa; Dinbiso; Kwargaba; Magargaba; Magarya; Marafa; Marnowa; S/Bazai-Abdu; Wurno
Yabo	Kilgori	851102	Bakale; Birni Ruwa; Kilgori
Yabo	Yabo	851101	Bingaje; Binji; Budurega; Dono; Fakka; Kibiyare; Muza; Ruggar; Torankawa; Yabo

== By electoral ward ==
Below is a list of polling units, including villages and schools, organised by electoral ward.

LGA	Ward	Polling Unit Name
Binji	Inname	Inname Masukayi; Guruza /Samama; Kusa Ga G/Mode (Ibinj); Faruwa Jamali; Gidan Bawa (Tudun Kose); Gidan Ginjo
Binji	Samama	Samama Marina; Samama Ungulu; Gidan Magaji; Gidan Almu
Binji	Binji	Shiyyar Ss / Fawa; Bajagawa; Shiyar Darai, Pry Sch Shiyar Darai; Shiyar Darai, Govt Tech College, Binji; Shiyar U. Dawaki; Filin Bande; Shiyar Sarkin Aski; Shiyar Sarki Fawa; Shiyar S/Fawa, Dan Fili
Binji	Jammali	Jammali G/Magaji; Filin Kasuwa; Daddale; Masarar Fulani; Dalijan Hausawa; Gidan Magaji Tobi; Jamali Tobi; Gidan Kirya
Binji	T/Kose	Tundan Kose; Ajogal, Model Pry Sch Ajogal; Taudi Zaidi; Gidan Maidebe, Pry Sch Gidan Maidebe; Kabawa Dan Hili
Binji	Gawazzai	Gawazzai; Banu Zumbu, Hili Banu-Zambu/Bani Zumbu; Dunkuma / Dunkuma; Yardewu; Matabare; Gawazai Danfili
Binji	Maikulki	Shiyar Hakimi, Mai Kulki; Kan Wuri Maikulki; Shiyar Marina, Maikulki; Shiyar Marina Yamma; Raga Labau Makaranta; Hizna Makaranta, Hizna; Uddiba G/Dikko Mamba; Kusa Da Garkar Magaji, Margai; Maliyon Almu, Maliyo; Kan-Wuri Maikulki, Finlin Baru
Binji	Bunkari	Shiyar Uban-Dawaki, Bunkari; Shiyar Uban-Dawaki, Fili; Shiyar Basharu, Garkar Basharu; Baliyo Hausa/Fulani; Danmali Gidan-Magaji; Dan Mali Gidan Baliyo; Gidan-Jauro/Gidan-Hakimi G/ Jauga; Gida-Dilo/Gidan Buji
Binji	Soro Gabas	Soro Garkar Hakima; Model Pry Sch, Soro; Gohitto, Primary School; Gwahitto Shiyar Kane; Fako Pry Sch; Tumuni Magaji; Tumuni Maiyaki, Maiyaki Pri Sch; Kandeza Pri. School; Jamboma G/Magaji
Binji	Soro Yamma	Kalgo, Mallamawa; Kalgo Pri. Sch; Kura Garkar Dikko; Kura Shiyar Kane; Birnin Wari G/Jauga; Birnin-Wari Gajare; Karani Masallaci; Karani Sabon-Zama; Alela Gidan Ardo; Alela Darusa
Bodinga	Bodinga/Tauma	Pry Sch, Gidan Bango; Pry Sch, Tauma; Shiyar Hausawa; Sh/Makera; Shiyar Filin Yar Ari S/Mode; Sh/Danjera P. S; Sh Andi, Sh/D/Jeka; Shiyar Liman, Sh/Fulani; Shiyar Kanti, Sh/Barebari; Shiyar Sarki; Filin Aisha, Sh/Aisha Filin Aisha; Shiyar Majema; Runjin Kudu D/Fili; Low Cost; Shiyar Hakimi/Marina
Bodinga	Bagarawa	Model Pry Sch, Shiyar Manu; Shiyar Hakimi, Gugari; Pry Sch, R/Yarde; Shiyar Harimi, R/Garba; Shiyar Harimi, Mallawa; Pry Sch, Bengel; Shiyar Hakimi, Saulana; Dispensary, Bagarawa
Bodinga	Mazan Gari/Jirga Miyo	Pry Sch, Kaura Miwyo; Shiyar Hakimi, Dan Babarbare; Pry Sch, Tandarawa; Shiyar Hakimi, Kimba Kaurare; Hurumi Pry Sch, Hurumi; Shiyar Magaji, Kabawa; Shiyar Magaji, Jirga; Shiyar Fulani, Jirga; Shiyar Magaji, Sire Maigishiri; Shiyar Magaji, Sire Kaka; Pry Sch, Dan Narba; Shiyar Hakimi, Tudun Manu; Fanfo Sh. Magaji, Tudun Nufawa; Shiyar Magaji, Rumbu; Shiyar Harimi, Kaura Iyara; Shiyar Kaurare, Mazan Gari; Pry Sch, Gwarko; Pry Sch, Buturu; Pry Sch, Ruga Gado; Shiyar Hakimi, Kulodo; Kauramiyo Adult Education Kauramiyo; Abdul Salamu Kauramiyo
Bodinga	Sifawa/Lukuyawa	Pry Sch, Shiyar Kudu I; Pry Sch, Shiyar Kudu II; Shiyar Hakimi, Shiyar Kudu; Jam'Atu Nasaral Islam, Shiyar Arewa; Adult Ed Nasaral Islam, Shiyar Arewa; Court Area, Shiyar Arewa; Pry Sch, Abdulsalami; Pri. Sch Lozobe/Dabagi; Gidan Rugga, Shiyar Yamma I; Shiyar Hakimi, Abdulsalami II; Shiyar Hakimi, Abdulsalami; Shiyar Hakimi, Gidan Abba; Shiyar Hakimi, Harumi/Fadama/ Hurumi Fadama Sh/Hakimi; Pry Sch, Luruyawa; Shiyar Maidabo, Gidan Sami; Shiyar Hakimi, Yararewa
Bodinga	Badau/Darhela	Pry Sch, Darhela; Lungun Darhela P. S; Hilin, Darhela Kaura; Kwarwara, Darhela Kaura; Badau Sh. Fulani Sh/ Hakimi; Badau Sh Dangiwa Sh/Hakimi; Makaranta Darhela D. Malle; Ruggar Igge Sh/Hakimi; Jangebe Islamic School; Rafin Sabo Primary Sch; Shiyar Hakimi, Gwastu; Shiyar Hakimi, Dunka; Badau, Bakin Kasuwa
Bodinga	Dingyadi/Badawa	Pry Sch, Shiyar Dangaladima; Nizzamiya, Shiyar Dangaladima; Dispensary, Shiyar Magaji; Shiyar Rafi, Shiyar Rafi; Kaura Buba Pry Sch; Kaura Buba; Pry Sch, Gidan Kokani; Pry Sch, Gidan Kijjo; Shiyar Magaji, Gidan Kijjo; Dispensary, Badawa; Pry Sch, Garba-Garba; Shiyar Magaji, Raha; Shiyar Magaji, Hamidawa; Pry Sch, Raha; Danfili, Runji Audu
Bodinga	Tulluwa/Kulafasa	Dispensary, Tullawa; Shiyar Kakimi, Ruggar Yantu; Shiyar Kakimi, Ruggar Jatau I; Shiyar Kakimi, Ruggar Jatau II; Shiyar Kakimi, Gyasharu; Shiyar Kakimi, Gidan Tsara; Pry Sch, Gidan Tsara; Shiyar Hakimi, Gidan Ruwa; Pry Sch, Bagarunne; Shiyar Haumi, Kwalfa I; Shiyar Hakimi, Kwalfa II; Shiyar Hakimi, Kulafasa I; Shiyar Hakimi, Kulafasa II; Pry Sch, Hausawa; Shiyar Hakimi, Hausawa; Shiyar Hakimi, Saidawa; Pry Sch, Tulluwa
Bodinga	Danchadi	Reading Room, Kanwuri; Yandurumi, Shiyar Alu Harka; Shiyar Hayi, Shiyar Hayi; Shiyar Dikko, Shiyar Dikko; Shiyar Danamo; Karaje, Karaje; Chilawa, Shiyar Titti; Sh. S/Fawa; Mrs Rumbuku; Karazuntu, Karazuntu; Shiyar Marafa, Shiyar Marafa; Pry Sch, Gidan Gwanfu; Shiyar Hakimi, Gidan Danbube; Yangidaje, Yangi Daje; Dutsin Mazara, Pry Sch; Pry Sch, Rumbuki
Bodinga	Bangi/Dabaga	Dabaga Pry Sch, Shiyar Marafa; Gidan Ajiya, Shiyar Marafa; Shiyar Hakimi, Wuro Elde; Maikataro/Shiyar Hakimi; Shiyar Hakimi, Kyaluje; Shiyar Hakimi, Chofi; Wumumu, Shiyar S/Dutsi; Bangi Dutse, Shiyar Marafa; Bangirafi Pry Sch. Sh-Sarki; Kwamtsi Kasuwa; Shiyar Hakimi, Luge; Batsauje, Shiyar Noma; Batsauje, Shiyar Barade; Pry Sch, Dutsin Maigunya; Shiyar Hakimi, Gidan Gadanga; Bangi Dutsi, Shiyar Dan Galadima
Bodinga	Kwacciyar Lalle	Model Pry Sch, Kwacciyar Lalle; Shiyar Hakimi, Kunkumi; Shiyar Hakimi, Sabara; Pry Sch, D/Duguza; Shiyar Hakimi, Kaura Kasa; Pry Sch, Bunazawa; Pry Sch, Zanagalawa; Shiyar Hakimi, Runji Kwarai; Bakin Masallaci, Bagalawa; Shiyar Hakimi, Tsomau
Bodinga	Takatuku/Madorawa	Shiyar Hakimi, Lulu Rafi I; Shiyar Hakimi, Lulu Rafi II; Model Pry Sch, Taratuku; Shiyar Hakimi, Shabon; Shiyar Magaji, Shiyar Dikko; Shiyar Hakimi, K/Goruwa; Model Pry Sch, D/Marera; Shiyar Hakimi, Gobirawa; Shiyar Hakimi Ruga Busau; Shiyar Hakimi, Kulalo; Tasha Milgoma
Dange/Shuni	Dange	S/Baura Nizzamiya/Kanwuri; Buide Bakin Titi; Adarawa, Adarawa; Bakin Kasuwa; Garkar Naboko, Mallammawa; Takalmawa, Bakin Fanfo; Takalmawa, Takalmawa; Pry Sch, Kindiru; Pry Sch, Hausawa; Hausa Garkar Hakimi; Model Pry Sch, Dankilo; Model Pry Sch, Gidan Ajiya; Model Pry Sch, Runji; Garkar Malam Maidama; Garkar Nagake, Darkana; Dafilin Kaurare Masallaci; Bakin Kasuwa - Buide
Dange/Shuni	Wababe/Salau	Gidan Ifad, Wababe Kudu; Wababe Pry Sch, Wababe Mps; Wababe Gabas - Shiyar G. Hakimi; Hammare, Hammare; Bayan Gidan H/Donawa; Model Pry Sch, Yola; Bayan Massalaci, Dabagin Wababe; G. M Altine Karadage; Hausare P. School; Hanyar Gidan Malam Hantsi, Malam Hantsi/ Gidan M. N Dali; Dorawar Dikko, Rakwamni; Model Pry Sch, Salau; Model Pry Sch, Sukandu; Filin Yarkasuwa, Illelar Salau; Belel Bakin Rijiya
Dange/Shuni	Bodai/Jurga	Model Pry Sch, Bodai Gabas; Farin Dutsi; Runjin Dubi; Bissalam Babban Gida; Kauran Magaji P/S; Bodai Yamma G/Icce; Haidara; Dan Fili, Kunkundo; Model Pry Sch, Jurga; Maitakobi, Maitakobi; Gani Kui; Yar Yarkasuwa Burgije
Dange/Shuni	Fajaldu	Model Pry Sch, Budude; Model Pry Sch, Dabagi; Gonar Yari/Asarara; Tabkin Kaiwa, Bakin G/Maigari; Bayan Gidan Mai Gari, Waramu/ Asarara; Gidan Burodi; Filin Inwala; Fajaldu M. P. S.; Model Pry Sch, Bissalam / Filin Inwala; Gonar Yari, Bissalam/Waramu
Dange/Shuni	Shuni	Jss Shuni; Shuni Model Pry School; Shuni District Registration Centre; Bayo Illele; Ruggar Kura, Ruggar Kura; Tudu, Tudu; Gidan Giye; Girgiri Registration Centre; Kwandi; Baragai; Yar Maigadi; Dabagin Dugui; Ruggar Yamma; Kwandi Jemawa; Kofar Tsamiya, Dan Faru; Shuni Dispensary
Dange/Shuni	Rudu/Amanawa	Rudu Makera; Gidan Jada; Shiyar Dikko; Rudu Primary School; Kalausa Rafi; Shiyar Hakimi; Hurumi, Hurumi; Amanawa Camp; Gidan Mande; Fili Makaranta; Hurumi Mps; Luggar Dauda
Dange/Shuni	Tsafanade	Gariyabo; Galankawa; Katsira; Tsakar Gida; Tsanfanade; Gidan Barmo; Adarawa; Bela, Bela; Gurgawa, Gurgawa
Dange/Shuni	Tuntube/Tsehe	Kwanawa; G. H Kwanawa; Dambuwa Pry Sch.; G. H Dambuwa; Gidan Baidu; Gonar Adamu, Gonar Adamu; Tudun Maitandu Pry Sch; Tsehe Pry Sch.; Garejin Gumbulu; Tuntube Pry Sch.; Ruggar Dutsi Pri. Sch; Tuntube Garkar Hakimi; Ruggar Giwa Pri. Sch; Tudun Danjeka Primary School; Lugga Tsara Pri. Sch; Littigawo, Littigawo; Littigawo B. Titi; Army C. M. P. S, Army C. M. P. S I; Army C. M. P. S, Army C. M. P. S II; Army C. M. P. S, Army C. M. P. S III; Army C. M. P. S, Army C. M. P. S IV; Army C. M. P. S, Army C. M. P. S V; Offa Road
Dange/Shuni	Giere/Gajara	Model Pry Sch, Giere; Riyojin Faru, Riyojin Faru; Danbasamu, Danbasamu; Heterete; Akali; Sidingu; Dabagi Mps; Birkitawa; Hunkui; Sabadawa, Sabadawa; Gajara; Zamfarawa, Zamfarawa; Majiyar Baraya; Dabagi Kanwuri; Damari; Geben Damu
Dange/Shuni	Rikina	Laffi, Laffi; Luggere, Luggere; Shiyar Abarma; Shiyar Shehu; Bubari Babba; Kwana, Kwana; Majo/Gidan Dikko; Sabaru
Dange/Shuni	Ruggar Gidado	Illela G Hakimi; Illela M. P. S; Kwannawa Jali; Banganange; Dilingu; Sambo Darni; Dan Barunje; Gyalaude B; Baila; Dabagin Rikina; Ruggar Dubbu; Rafin Jidda; Zango, Zango; Illela R/Dubu; Nagandi, Nagandi
Gada	Kaddi	Kaddi Sh. Magaji, Islamiyya; Kaddi Sabon Gari; Gidan Illo, Shiyar Magaji; Kwarma Alkali, Pry Sch; Gidan Gado I; Gidan Bagirbi, Shiyar Magaji; Gidan Dan Yaro, Shiyar Magaji; Gidan Gadabo Pri. Sch.; Tsururu Madugu, Shiyar Magaji; Kaddi Tudu, Shiyar Magaji; Gidan Jatau, Shiyar Magaji; Gadabo Pry Sch; Gidan Gyado, Pry Sch. II; Gidan Ubandoma, Shiyar Magaji; Gadabo, Pry Sch Gadabo
Gada	Kadadin Buda (Kaddi)	Kadadin Buda, Dispensary; Kadadin Buda, Pry Sch K/B; Gidan Gaina, Pry Sch G. Gaina; Rafinduma, Pry Sch Rd; Rafinduma, Shiyar Magaji; Gidan Salau, Pry Sch Salau; Ingaboro, Pry Sch; Sabon Gari Gidan Arzika, Pry Sch; Kadadin Maidabo, Pry Sch; Kaga Danfili; Tantarkwai, Pry Sch; Sagerar Dikko, Dan Fili; Sagerar Ango, Dan Fili; Tuffal Aliyu, Dan Fili; Gidan Kwani, Tasha; Iddarawa, Dan Fili; Tuffal Baba, Dan Fili; Gidanzafi, Dan Fili; Rafinduma, Pry Sch
Gada	Gilbadi	Gilbadi Gari, Dispensary; Gidan Ada, Dan Fili; Gidan Abdo, Pry Sch; Gidan Kacha, Pry Sch; Tsaro Maikasuwa, Pry Sch; Gidan Liyal Pry Sch; Gidan Yarfada, Pry Sch; Gidan Ayuba Pry Sch; Takalmawa, Pry Sch; Gidan Maiturare; Tsaro Malamai; Gundunbul, Pry Sch; Gidan Maijaguwa Pry Sch; Gidan Mai Turare, Shiyar Magaji; Gidan Jobi Pry Sch; Sakitawa, Pry Sch; Gidan Bashara; Gidan Ajanbo Shiyar Magaji; Sabon Gari Gilbadi; Gidan Darhu
Gada	Tsitse	Karangiya; Gidan Adawa Pry Sch; Gidan Hashimu I; Koroji; Gidan Gulbi; Gidan Shekarau, Dan Fili; Jingilma, Pry Sch; Shiyar Dan Galadima; Gasaho; Gidan Kaura; Basana; Gidan Tudu; Gidan Hashimu II; Tsitse, Pry Sch
Gada	Kaffe	Shiyar Hamma; Shiyar Sarikin Yaki; Gidan Zomo; Ali Bawa Shiyar Sani; Bantalawa; Safiyal Magori; Yagarmawa; Bantalaw S/Magaji; Safiyar Magori; S/Sani Wakili
Gada	Dukamaje/Ilah	Ilah Gari, Ilah Pry Sch; Tabanni, Pry Sch; G/Fako; Tsuga Babba; Gidan Bako; D/Maje Yamma; Gidan Buta; Dogon Daji Faru; Gidan Kuka, Pry Sch; Gidan Rai Rai; Gidan Albakari; Gidan Rabami; Rabamawa, Pry Sch; Gidan Jada, Shiyar Hakimi; Gidan Barmu, Shiyar Hakimi; Gidan Tadiya, Shiyar Hakimi; Duka Maje Gabas; Jangargari, Shiyar Magaji; Banbaro, Shiyar Magaji
Gada	Kyadawa/Holai	Shiyar Gazawur; Shiyar D. Galadima; Kalaba; Jattalawa; Danbirema; Gubetawa, Pry Sch; Samarin Marake; Wauru Shiyar Magaji; Wauru Shiyar Mano; Wauru Makaba; Holai Kanwuri; Holai Tabki; Bujaga, Pry Sch; Gidan Maikamba, Pry Sch; Gidan Amamata, Pry Sch; Gidan Bawa Kofato, Shiyar Hakimi; Gidan Dan Kasa; Zangon Ajallo; Dunkulawa, Pry Sch; Holai Buzaye, Pry Sch; Bunyagadi, Pry Sch; Holai Sabon Gar; Gidan Jattal; Wauru N. P. S; Gidan Kara
Gada	Kadassaka	Shiyar Ajiya; Shiyar Jari; Tundun Bulus; Shiyar Sarkin Yayi; Gidan Yaraba Pry Sch I; Tsaidawa, Tsaidawa; Mawa Habibu; Kadassaka Kiliya, Pry Sch; Kiliya, Pry Sch; Shiyar Bawa I; Shiyar Bawa II; Shiyar Sanda; Mawa Sanda; Gidan Yaraba Pry Sch II
Gada	Kwarma	Kwarmar Dikko, Pry Sch; Kwarmar Pry. Sch; Kwarama; Kumaji; Sabon Gida; Kiri Kafada
Goronyo	Goronyo	Shiyar Bugaje, Shiyar Bugaje; Shiyar Sarkin Yaki, Yarkofa; Shiyar Madatsa, Madatsa; Shiyar Noma, Shiyar Noma; Shiyar Sabongari, Bugaje Pry Sch; Shiyar Yamma, Yanhudu; Zamfarawa, Zamfarawa; Kiraren Dutsi, Kiraren Dutsi; Illela/Mariri, Illela; Taloka/Badama, Badama; Taloka Kanwuri - Kanwuri; Bala Kozo, Bala Kozo; Gare, Gare; Gadon Mata, Gadon Mata; Kumaji, Kumaji; Taloka, Gaddawa - Gaddawa; Asarara, Stadium Goronyo; Kirare, Kirare Pry Sch
Goronyo	Giyawa	Shiyar Galadima, Galadima; Shiyar Ubandawaki; Shiyar Fadama, Fadama; Faringida, Faringida
Goronyo	Boyeka I	Tsohon Garin Boyekai; Sabon Garin Boyekai; Gamihar/Kawara; Yar Nagge, Yar Nagge; Gidan Saidu, Gidan Saidu
Goronyo	Kagara	Shiyar Marafa; Shiyar Sarkawa; Shiyar Sanyaya, Balla; Kawadata/ Kawadata; Illela Dawagare, Dawagare; Danjiro, Danjiro; Kuda - Kuda
Goronyo	Kwakwazo	Kwakwazo S/Noma; Tantar Kwai, Tantar Kwai; Tukayaci Musa/Tukayan Salau; Rungumawa, Rungumawa; Maganga, Maganga; Gidan Fako; Gidan Gezu; Zamace, Zamace/Zamachen Dan Tsohuwa; Yamin Kwabe, Yamin Kwabe; Gidan Barau, Gidan Barau; Miyalyako, Miyalyako; Kwakwazo, Kwakwozo Pry Sch
Goronyo	Kojiyo	Shiyar Magaji; Bare Tsara; Gamihar Huri, Ganihar Huri; Darbabiya Darbabiya; Malaba, Malaba
Goronyo	Rimawa	Shiyar Rafi/Magaji, Dispensary; Gyayyu/Goda Gado; Bulun-Bukut, Bulun Bukut; Rumbukawa, Rumbukawa; Mullela, Mullela; Katsira; Jar Gaba; Keta/Mullela; Falaliya, Falaliya; Dan Tudu, Dan Tudu; Duba Jalo S/Fawa; Zangon Arawa, Zango Arawa; Kuri; Takarau, Takarau; Mahalba; Gidan Kirya, Gidan Kirya; Kaikazzaka/Ambarura; Biyarda; Riyojin Tanka, Juli
Goronyo	Shinaka	Jingilma Shinaka; Shiyar Maba, Hailin Na Mazo; Shiyar Baura, Shinaka; Shiyar Noma, Shiyar Noma; Shiyar Gayawa; Tuluske, Tuluske; Aciido/Gidan Toro; Dantudu Masari; Zamale / Kututturu; Gidan Alfarma, Gidan Alfarma; Gidan Abdo, Gidan Abdo; Kurhiyawa/Tajaye; Gidan Michikal; Shiyar Maba Yanchediya, Shinaka; Shiyar Maba, Aja Shinaka; Masari, Masari
Goronyo	S/Gari Dole/Dan/Tasakko	Shiyar Galadima; Shiyar Zaki; Dansilba; Gidan Magajiya; Bijeji; Tsohon Garin Dole; Dantasakko; Sarwa; Ololi Kamitau; Gundumi; Malafaru; Kubutta; Kunawa; Danwaru
Goronyo	Birjingo	Birjingo; Mallamawa; Warankai; Tuluttu, Dan Fili; Ganza/Bungi; Gidan Tudu, Gidan Tudu; Kumuiniya/Furagirke; Tuluttu, Tuluttu Pry Sch
Goronyo	Takakume	Takakume, Dan Fili; Takakume/Bukka Hamsin; Gorau, Bakin Kasuwa; Mai Iyali; Gidan Alwale; Sakkarawa, Sakkarawa; Dangarko, Dangarko
Gudu	Karfen Sarki	Asibitin Gari, Karfen Sarki; Town Pry Sch, Karfen Sarki; Dan Fili, Filasko; Dan Fili, Hudar Marke; Dan Fili, Taura Mata; Karfen Sarki Dan Fili Karfen Sarki; Filasko-Dan Fili
Gudu	Chilas/Makuya	Chilas Yamma; Chilas Gabas; Makuya Yamma; Makuya Gabas; Danfili, Kasaura; Dangadabro; Tulluwa; Kwalchi
Gudu	Bachaka	Bachaka Gabas; Backaka Yamma; Tulun Biri; Zabarmawa; Salawa; Baki / Gumbin Duri; Shatoka; Danfili, Gidan Dantanin; Pry Sch, Arbakwai; Bachaka Danfili
Gudu	Gwazange/Boto	Pry Sch, Gwazange; Danfili, Boto; Danfili, Yaka Gabas; Danfili, Yaka Yamma; Danfili Gwazange
Gudu	Kurdula	Pry Sch, Kurdula; Shiyar Dambo; Adarawa, Zabarmawa; Kurunkusiti/Bunya; Darusa Gawo; Darusa Musa; Darusa Samna; Katsura, Katsura; Dabaga, Dabaga; Adarawa Zabarmawa Danfili
Gudu	Balle	Balle Gabas; Bale Yamma; Rafin Kubu; Marafa, Bangi; Kokotau; Tungar Balle; Kutufare; Dayeji; Balli Danfili; Rafin Kubu B
Gudu	Awulkiti	Danfili Awulkiti Maigari; Kukokin Rafi; Rafin Kalgo; Hus; Danfili Awulkiti Pry Sch
Gudu	Karfen Chana	Danfili, Karfen China; Mallamawa, Karfen China; Bunguel Danfili; Tungar Namaiwa
Gudu	Maraken Bori	Danfili, Maraken Bori; Danfili, Maraken Fulani; Danfili, Jima Jimin Sule; Danfili, Tagimba; Danfili Jima Jimin Gaya
Gudu	Tulun Doya	Danfili, Tulun Doya \A\'; Danfili, Tudun Doya \B\'; Kiso, Kiso; Yamo, Yamo; Kwararaf, Kwararaf
Gwadabawa	Asara Kudu	Shiyar Magaji; Shiyar Galadima, Shiyar Galadima; Makaranta, Shiyar Galadima; Makaranta, Tungar Madugu; Makaranta, Tungar Kwangi; Danfili, Rumbuje; Makaranta/T/Tudu Buga; Makaranta /Rangandawa; Danfili, Agajiba; Makaranta, Karanbi; Danfili, Kwaren Gezu; Gidan Alfarma, Dakwale Mayel; Shiyar Hakimi, Tungar Rafi; Danfili, Tungar Kurfai; Tsakar Gari, Tungar Kwangi; T/Kwaci-Dan Fili
Gwadabawa	Asara Arewa	Shiyar Hakimi, Fadan Kai; Gari, Mamman Suka; Tsakar Gari, Gidan Anazar; Tsakar Gari, Zango Nahantsi; Pry Sch, Bauda; Bakin Masalaci, Makina Alfarma; Tsakar Gari, Makina Maifuchi; Pry Sch Hura, Hura/Magama; Pry Sch T. Muwaila, Tudun Muwaila; Shiyar Hakimi, Maman Suka Gari; Pry Sch, Mamman Suka G. Geza; Tsakar Gari, Mallamawa/Kagalaba; Dispensary, Fadan Kai; Shiyar Hakimi, Makina Alfarma
Gwadabawa	Atakwanyo	Pry Sch, Atakwanyo; Shiyar Masallau, Atakwanyo; Pry Sch, Wazi Basa; Tashar Gawo, Atakwanyo Gusau; Pry Sch, Burdi; Kangiyen Dan Inna, Kangiyen Dan Inna; Shiyar Hakimi, Kangiyen T/Giwa; Kattalar Dutsi, Kattalar Dutsi; Kattalar Kaura, Kattalar Kaura; Abo Kire; Chobal Pri. Sch.; Pri. Sch. Gidan Magaji Wazari; Gwargwa Pry Sch, Gwaragwa
Gwadabawa	Chimmola/Kudu	Pry Sch Model Maiwada; Shiyar Sarkin Yari, S. Yaki I; Shiyar Magaji, Shiyar Magaji; Shiyar Sikola, Sh. Hausawa; Shiyar Hakimi, Sh. Kagara; Adarawa, Shiyar Hakimi Hashi; Shiyar Hakimi, Lukuwa; Shiyar Saidu, Shiyar Saidu Lukuwa; Shiyar Hakimi T Tudu Kwankwan Bali; Buzalega Sh, Buzalega; Shiyar Hakimi, Kwakwango; Shiyar II Yako
Gwadabawa	Chimola Arewa	Matse, Matse; Here, Here/Gala; Shiyar Liman, Tambagarka Sh Liman; Shiyar Dan Oro, Shiyar Dan Oro; Shiyar Kaura, Shiyar Kaura; Kalaba, Kalaba; Shiyar Hakimi, Dangero/Rangandawa; Kasuwa, Tungar Malam Rashidu; Shiyar Hakimi, Kagoye/Adosa; Wadai, Wadai Pry. Sch; Tataye Tataye Pry Sch.; Shiyar Uban Dawaki, Shiyar Ubandawaki; Shiyar S Fulani, Sh S. Fulani I; Shiyar S Fulani, Sh S. Fulani II; Adamare, Tambagarka S/Umau Adamare
Gwadabawa	Gidan Kaya	Makaranta, Shiyar Magaji; Lukumawa, Shiyar Magaji; Danfili, Shiyar Baura; Filin Injin, Shiyar Baura; Shiyar Hakimi, Takalmawa; Shiyar Hakimi, Kililawa; Asibiti/Yargada/Mullela; Shiyar Hakimi, Galadiman Tsabre; Shiyar Hakimi, Dan Gwaya/K. Daudu; Asibiti, Marinnawa G. Dogaza; Makaranta/Dan Fanga/Talhi; Gwara/Dancha; Shiyar Hakimi, Tudun Mai Dukusa; Shiyar Hakimi, Gidan Dutsi R./Aduw; Shiyar Hakimi, Gidan Birgau; Shiyar Hakimi, Kaurar Kayama; Shiyar Magaji, Makanta, Sh Magaji
Gwadabawa	Gigane	Shiyar Magaji, Shiyar Magaji; Karanbi, Karanbi; Shiyar Tudu, Shiyar Tudu; Shiyar Samri, Shiyar Samri; Shiyar Salihu, Shiyar Salihu; Shiyar Baici, Shiyar Baici; Tungar Noma, Tunga Noma; Pry Sch, Sakamaru; Gidan Rana, Gidan Rana; Labchedi, Labchedi; Gamaru, Gamaru / T. Malam; Tunkuru Dikko / T. Garba, Tunkurar; Shiyar Galadima, Sh. Galadima Meli; Shiyar Tudu, Sh. Tudu Meli; Yolabale, Yolabale; Gwargwawo, Gwargwawo; Shiyar Liman, Shiyar Liman; G. Maidamma, Gidan Maidamma
Gwadabawa	Mammande	Shiyar Sarkin Yaki, Sh. S. Yaki; Shiyar Sarkin Yaki, Sh. Galadima; Jema Pry Sch, Sh. Magaji; Jema Pry Sch, Sh. Shiyar Tudu; Jema Pry Sch, Sh. Baici; Shiyar Mumuni, Kolar Zamana/Maman; Bamana Madawaki, Bamana Sh. Madawaki; Bamana Madawaki, Bamana Sh. Mamman; Wurin Inji, Bamana Sh. Gangare; Yar Kofa, T/Masawa/Sh. Anaruwa; Gidan Ardo, Zugana; Shiyar Atiku Zugana; Dispensary, Chiragal; Dispensary, Gidan Tune; Shiyar Ardo, Zugana
Gwadabawa	Salame	Jumat Pms, Shiyar Jekada; Library, Shiyar Jekada; Pry Sch, Almatawa; Shiyar Hakimi, Shiyar Hakimi Doka; Shiyar Hakimi, Shiyar Abu Dabowa; Pry Sch, Dabuwasa T. Zaki; Yar Bulutu, Kiliyar Sodangi; Shiyar Hakimi, Maranawa; Yantawaya, Sh. Tudun Baraya; Shiyar Hakimi, Kofar Magaji; Dispensary, Tungar Shanu; Dispensary, Dan Abba; Binga Town Bonga
Gwadabawa	Huchi	Shiyar Hakimi, Maranawa; Shiyar Hakimi, Sabon Gari; Filin Injin, Kabawa; Pry Sch, Kaura Huchi; Shiyar Hakimi, Jujin Magaji; Kasuwa, Yaurawa; Pry Sch, Shiyar Galadima
Illela	Illela	Shiyar Bawa II Tsohuwarkotu; Shiyar Lihoda Sonani; Shiyar Bawa Makaranta; Shiyar Ubanda Waki / Kawuru; Tsohuwar Tasha S/Tudun Amarwa; Shiyar Tudu Makaranta; Filin Hamza Shiyar Namata; Shiyar Namata Shiyar Maiunguwa; Shiyar Mamata; Tudun Gudalekwa / Kwara; Shiyar Ubandawaki G/Tanko Maihirde; Shiyar Bawa III G/Kifi; Shiyar Maidawa II, Gidan Danliyoso; Shiyar Bawa / Fili Dan Wazam; Tudun Gudale Mairuwa I; Tudun Gudale Mairuwa II; Shiyar Namata; Gidan Kyasu, Gidan Kyasu; Sh/Ubandawaki / G/Yarma; Sh / Bawa Makaranta; Shiyar Bawa, V. Abiyarima; Sh/Namata G. G. S. S; Shiyar Namata, Hilin Namata/Sh/Madawa Isnomau; Shiyar Bawa Gidan S/Shanu; Sh/Lihidda Makaranta Sonane; Sh/Sabon Gari Amarawa Gawo
Illela	Kalmalo	Shiyar Galadima, Asibiti; Shiyar Galadima, S/Mamman Ala; Shiyar Rafi, S/Wadata; Shiyar Ajiya, S/Ajiya; Rundjin Kuware, Makaranta; Jema, S/Magaji; Tumbulunkum, Babban Hili; Munwadata, Makaranta; Runjintudu, Makaranta; Sabon Gari Makaranta; Tabkin Taramniya, S/Alfarma; Shiyar Dangaladima, S/Kalmalo
Illela	Damba	Shiyar Galadima Damba, Godabe; Shiyar Magaji Damba, Makaranta; Damba Kwanawa, H/Babba; Gidan Kudubo, Pri. Sch.; Labuda G/ Taramniya; Tarke, Makaranta; Luguhuru, Hili; Buwade, S. Hakimi; Gundun Gudun, S. Hakimi; Tsauna, Makaranta; Sabon Gida, S/Magaji; Gidan Gada, G. Gada; Buwade, Dan Fili
Illela	Darna/ Sabon Gari	Darna Sabon Gari, Shiyar Galadima; Gidan Tudu, Makaranta; Tungar Zango, Makaranta; Darna Kiliya, Makaranta; Tsira Rai, G./Sale; Haragawa, Makaranta; Mullela, Mullela; Tungar Matsi, S/Salau; Gidan Kware, S. Hakimi; Tungal Diya, S. Hakimi; Darna Kwango, S. Hakimi; Gidan Rabo, Shiyar Magaji; Maimasu, Maimasu; Galadima Gidan Salau, Shiyar Hakimi; Gidan Gwanyo, Shiyar Hakimi; Tungar Zango, Tungar Zango
Illela	Darne/ Tsolawo	Darna Tsolawo, Makaranta; Gidan Rana; Birnin Isah; Dankadu; Kalaba, Kalaba; Gidan Alasan, G/Alasan; Zango Zango; Dabagin Tankari, D/Tankari; Dantulle, Dantulle; Yardarna; Dabagin Tankari, Dabagin Tankari
Illela	G/ Hamma	Gidan Iddau; Shiyar Adarawa, Hilin Inwala; Munwadata, Munwadata; Shiyar Abdulraziku, Dan Hili; Tungar Almu, T/Almu; Zangon Shaho, Zangon Shaho; Mansalawa Babba; Daramba; Shiyar Garba, Hakimi; Takalmawa, Takalmawa; Taka Tsaba; Tsangaladam, Tsangaladam; Gidan Makera; Gidan Makera, Sh Magaji Makaranta; Shiyar Magaji, Makaranta; Gidan Abuba, Gidan Abuba; Shiyar Rafi; Ambarura Y/ Masalawa, Y/Ambarura; Ambarura Dabagi, S. Latsa; Gidan Faja, Gidan Faja; Here, Here; Hura Girke, Hura Girke; Dumaje Kware; Ambarura Makaranta, Makaranta; Ambarura Inwala, Makaranta; Shiyar Rafi B, S/Rafi; Ambarurawa Dan Hili Makaranta; Ambarura Makaranta B, Danhili
Illela	Araba	Shiyar Katune, Hili Babba; Shiyar Galadima, Hilin Tudu; Shiyar Katune, Tsamiya; Bakin Dutsi, Hili Babba; Gidan Kamil, G/Malam Tunau; Hura, Gidan Magaji; Danboka, Gidan Tudu; Zango Alkason, Gida Magaji; Dango S. Magaji, Hili; Dango S/Jibo, Kwakwara; Sh/Katune Araba Makaranta; Bakin Dutsi, Makaranta; Dan Boka, Makaranta
Illela	R. Gati	Rungumawar Gatti, Makaranta; Gidan Hamma, G. Magaji; Gidan Kirya, Garkar Noma; Rungumawar Jao, Danhili; Lakoda, Kwakwara; Zangon Lakoda, Kalgo; Lafani, Makaranta; Gidan Ciwake Makarata; Tudun Aya, Kwakwara; Idiki, Makaranta; Gidan Dodo, Gidan Dodo; Rungumawar Gatti, Shiyar Galadima; Sabon Garin Hamma, Hili Babba; Lafani Azamawa, Garkar Hakimi; Lakoda, Lakoda
Illela	Tozai	Shiyar S. Fawa Tozai, Filin Agale; Tozai S. Hakimi, S. Mamman Hakimi; Tozai Bayan Dutsi, Makaranta; Masawa Gidan Kura, Hili Babba; Gidan S. Fawa, Makaranta; Gidan Makera; Gidan Bango, Makaranta; Koringo, Makaranta; Gidan Abarshi, Gidan Abarshi; Balaskiya, Balakiya; Chofa, Chofa; Gidan Ajiya, Gidan Ajiya
Illela	G/ Katta	Basanta, Basanta; Gaidau, Makaranta; Kwandamo, Kwandamo; Malali, Makaranta; Gidan Katta, S. Hakimi; Gidan Sandaga, G. Sandaga; Masasa, Masasa Hili; Mashekarin Basanta, Mashekari; Gaidan Makaranta, Makaranta; Basanta Makaranta, Makaranta
Isa	Isa North	Garkar Baraya, Shiyar Baraya; Shiyar Bugaje; Kantamawa, Fage Kantamawa; Kofar Yamma; Sarkin Gobir Model Pry, Sch Isa; Sarkawa, Sarkawa; Garkar Sarkin Gobir; Garkar Sardauna; Bakin Kasuwa, Isa; Govt Sce Sch Isa, Sec Sch; Shiyar Baraya, Angawa
Isa	Isa South	Kwanar Isa, Pri. Sch.; Kurar Mota, Pri. Sch.; Shiyar Danbalabe Maitansu Pri. Sch.; Shiyar Danbalabe, Maigarke; Shiyar Danbalarabe, Yar Makafi; Shiyar Danbalarabe, Sardauna Pri. Sch.; Shiyar Gajo, Yakasuwar Magaji; Sh/Gajo Kuda Allah G/A Suk Sec; Gidan Sec. Ilyasu; Garkar Sakataren Isa, Kusaga Gidan Sakatare; Shallamawa, Shallamawa; Herama Gidan Alhaji Jijji; Yarkasuwa, Gidan Tudu Shop; Shiyar Muhammadu, Dudakin; Garin Hassan; Shiyar D/B Maitanbu P/School
Isa	Turba	Turba Magazawa, Pri. Sch.; Kofar Yamma, Kofar Yamma; Zaure Hudu, Zaure Hudu; Kaibaba, Pri. Sch.; Gawakuke, Danfili; Gidan Bawa, Pri. Sch.; Shalla, Pri. Sch.; Takwastawa, Fage Shiyar Maigari; Madattai, Fage; Gumal, Pri. Sch.
Isa	Tsabren Sarkin Darai	Adarawa, Adarawa; Gidan Dikko, Pri. Sch.; Tuntube, Tuntube; Tsabren Sarkin Darai, Dispensary; Tsabren Altine, Pri. Sch.; Girnashe, Pri. Sch.; Girnashe Sabon Gari, Sabon Gari; Gidan Abdulkarim, Pri. Sch.; Kukar Nadada, Shiyar Maigari; Rijiyar Malan Ladan, Pri. Sch.
Isa	Tidibale	Kalka'Iru, Kalka'Iru; Chohimayal; Gidan Sale, Gidan Sale; Salamawa, Salamawa; Tidibale, Shiyar Sarkin Noma; Shiyar Arawa, Shiyar Arawa; Gamaroji, Gamaroji; Jimbama, Jimbama; Gidan Maikwano, Gidan Maikwano; Dan Gulbi, Dan Gulbi
Isa	Bargaja	Bargaja, Pri. Sch.; Bargaja Kibiya, Bargaja Shiyar Kibiya; Bagaja Chiediya; Modaci, Fage; D/Zanke Makaranta; Modaci Shiya Hassan, Shiyar Hassan/Modachi S/Hassan; Lugu Shiyar Mamman; Gazau, Makaranta; Kalage, Makaranta
Isa	Yanfako	Yanfako; Takkin Hili; Dogon Hano; Garin Ubandawaki; Araga; Galube; Takalmawa, Takalmawa; Tabkin Hili
Isa	Gebe 'A'	Gebe Makaranta; G/Bawa; S/Garin Dangwdi; Kamarawa, Makaranta; Kamarawa Kanwuri, Kanwuri; Garin Fadama; Manawa/Makaranta; Kagara/Gebe, Makaranta; Gebe, Kanwuri; Manawa G/Tudu
Isa	Gebe 'B'	Bafarawa Makaranta; Arume Yarkasuwa; Kowa Iko, Bafarawa; Arume Gidan Moyi; Dangurmu, Dangurmu; Tungar Galadima; Tungar Danzanke; Surudubu, Makaranta
Kware	Kware	Dogon Fili, Danfili; Sangame, Sangame; Ruggarwakaso, R/Wakaso; Shiyar Gawo, Shiyar Gawo; Kofar Barga, Shiyar Barga; Yar Yahaya, Yar Yahaya; Tarawa, Tarawa/ Tarawa; Runfar Falke, Runfar Falke
Kware	Bankanu/ R, Kade	Bankanu, Shiyar Hakimi; Bankanu Maraba, Pri. Sch.; Kasgada, Shiyar Hakimi; Kwazari, Shiyar Hakimi; Fandu, Shiyar Hakimi; Almumin, Shiyar Hakimi; Tungar Bahago, Shiyar Hakimi; Makera, Shiyar Hakimi; Rijiyar Kade, Shiyar Hakimi; Agalawa, Shiyar Hakimi; Sabon Gari, Shiyar Hakimi; Runji, Pri. Sch.; Kalalawa, Pri. Sch I; Kalalawa, Pri. Sch II; Tutuba, Shiyar Hakimi; Kwallatawa, Shiyar Hakimi; Mashidi, Shiyar Hakimi
Kware	Basansan	Basansn, Shiyar Hakimi; Basansan Basansa Pri. Sch.; Modawa, Shiyar Hakimi; Gidanmutune, Shiyar Hakimi; Lemi, Pri. Sch.; Taino, Pri. Sch.; Runbuki, Shiyar Hakimi; Sire Dandoro, Shiyar Hakimi; Gidan Aiki, Shiyar Hakimi
Kware	S/Birni/ G. Karma	Jingine, Jingine; Tungar Maijakkai, Tungar Maijakkai; Gidan Jahadi, Gidan Jahadi; Ihi, Ihi; Gundunga Yalo; Gundunda Alkali; Gundunga Alkali Shiyar Hakimi; Gidan Karma Pri. Sch.; Balkori, Pri. Sch.; Sabon Birni, Pri. Sch.; Jajaye, Shiyar Hakimi; Dobah, Shiyar Hakimi; Tungar Amma, Shiyar Hakimi; Bela, Shiyar Hakimi; Malakiwa, Shiyar Hakimi
Kware	H/ Ali/ Marabawa	Hamma'Ali, Pri. Sch.; Hamma'Ali, Kasuwar Hamma'Ali; Gidan Bukwai, Shiyar Sarkin Daji; Gidan Tuta, Shiyar Hakimi; Gidan Gabas, Shiyar Hakimi; Maranawa, Shiyar Hakimi; Cinawa, Shiyar Hakimi; Galadanchi Shiyar Hakimi; Sarakawa, Shiyar Hakimi; Gidan Maishiro, Hilin Masallaci
Kware	G/ Modibbo/ G. Akwara	Gidan Akwara, Pri. Sch.; Gidan Maikara, Shiyar Hakimi; Mallamawa, Shiyar Hakimi; Hausa Sh. Hakimi; Sabon Gari; Ruggar Giwa, Pri. Sch. I; Ruggar Giwa, Pri. Sch. II; Sirejalo, Shiyar Hakimi; Gidan Modibbo, Pri. Sch.; Gidan Musa, Shiyar Hakimi; Karadai, Shiyar Hakimi; Gidan Dan Rabi, Shiyar Hakimi; Gidan Rairai, Shiyar Hakimi; Gidan Sirgi, Shiyar Hakimi; Umma Ruma, Pri. Sch. I; Umma Ruma, Pri. Sch. II
Kware	G. Rugga	Gidan Rugga, Shiyar Hakimi; Ruggar Liman, Shiyar Hakimi I; Ruggar Liman, Shiyar Hakimi II; Runjin Tsamiya, Shiyar Hakimi; Gandu, Pri. Sch.; More, Pri. Sch. I; More, Pri. Sch. II
Kware	Durbawa	Rugga, Rugga; Sarkawa, Sarkawa; Kaura, Kaura; Dunguji, Dunguji; Toranka Dakare, Toranka, Dakare; Toranka Dawaki, Toranka Dawaki; Gidan Kulodo, Gidan Kulodo; Gidan Gero, Gidan Gero; Kurfi, Kurfi
Kware	Tunga/ Mallamawa	Tunga, Pri. Sch.; Tunga, Shiyar Hakimi; Tungar Duna, Shiyar Hakimi; Nufawa, Pri. Sch.; Gebawa, Shiyar Hakimi; Mallamawa Sarkin Yaki, Pri. Sch.; Mallamawa Kasuwa, Kaura Mallamawa; Gidan Gari, Shiyar Hakimi; Rafin Dubau, Shiyar Hakimi; Gidan Bassakare, Pri. Sch.; Tanrago, Shiyar Hakimi
Kware	Kabanga	Kabanga, Pri. Sch.; Zango Jagaba, Shiyar Hakimi; Geben Damu, Shiyar Hakimi; Gwargal, Shiyar Hakimi; Kagara Masu, Pri. Sch.; Fada Walki, Shiyar Hakimi; Kadaba, Shiyar Hakimi; Gurada Bazo, Shiyar Hakimi; Kardidaye, Shiyar Hakimi; Tsariki, Shiyar Hakimi
Kware	Tsaki/ Walake'E	Zamau Pri. Sch., Pri. Sch.; Zamau Masallaci, Shiyar Masallaci; Tsaki/Adarawa; Gantamau; Bangu, Shiyar Hakimi; Chida, Shiyar Hakimi; Walaka'E, Shiyar Hakimi; Dangawo, Shiyar Hakimi; Bagga 'A', Shiyar Hakimi; Dankomani, Pri. Sch.; Maruda, Pri. Sch.; Mamda, Barnawa Pry. Sch.
Kebbe	Kebbe East	Shiyar Ubawawaki, Garkar Hashim; Tudunwada, T/Wada Pry Sch; Shiyar Sabon Gari, Garkar Alh. Musa; Dukura A, Dukura D/Hili; Kunkuru, D/Hili; Shiyar Ubandawari, M. P. Sch; Dukura B, D/Hili; Mallamawa, Garkar M. Nainu; Balijan D/Hili
Kebbe	Kebbe West	Asarara; Umbutu Pry Sch, Umbutu (A); Runtuwa; Shiyar Ajiya, Shiyar Kebbe; Shiyar S/Fawa; Sabon Gari; Umbutu, Umbutu; Masallacin Tuni D/Hayatu, Kurhi
Kebbe	Margai - A	Dumka, D/Hili; Jigiri; Gaddacce, Gadacce Pry Sch; Tungar Mindaudu D/Hill; Margai Sh. Shantali, Asibiti; Margai Sh. Galadima, Sh. Galadima; Yarrudda, D/Hili
Kebbe	Margai - B	Unwala, Unwala; Margai Sh Sallama M Ada; Margai Sh Kaura; Gauru Kasuwar Magaji; Karma D/Hili; D/Hili; Illela D/Hili
Kebbe	Nasagudu	Nasagudu, Nasagudu Pry Sch; Tungar Maje, Pry Sch; Kwanta, Garkar M. Bayero; Bomna, Bomna Pry Sch; Garin Musa, Pry Sch; Garin Kofa, Garin Kofa; Kunduttu, Pry Sch; Dutsin Kuka, Pry Sch; Tungar Labbo; Kawara, Garkar Marafa; Sh. Gandu, Dan Hili; Shiyan Gandu, Kuchi, Kaiwa Ayi; Sh. Gandu Garkar A. Bello
Kebbe	Sangi	Nabasa, Nabasa Pry Sch; Sangi, Sangi Pry Sch; Jigawa, Jigawa Pry Sch; Sabon Birni, S. Birni Pry Sch; Yar Romo, Garkar Hakimi; Sabon Birni 2, Shiyar Magaji; Sabla, Sabala Pry Sch; Tune, M. P. S; Lumu Garkar Hakimi; Sangi Sh Kofar
Kebbe	Fakku	Fakku Sh. S/ Fakku; Rafin Kade/ Dutsin Lere Pry Sch; Shaal Washi Primary School; Bashi Primary School; Rarah Magaji; Rarah Primary School; Rafingora Primary School; Sadu, Sadu Primary School; Shiyar S. Ruwa, S. S Ruwa Fakku; Bindanu, Bindanu D/Hili; Bakindutsi, Bakindutsi; Uru, Uru Danhili
Kebbe	Ungushi	Gwandi Pry Sch, Gwandi; Sh Magaji, Ungushi; Sh Ubandawaki, Ungushi; Ungushi Asibiti; Pry Sch Maikurfuna; Maikurfuna Gidan Garso
Kebbe	Girkau	Garkau S. Galadima; Mazoji, Mazoji Pry Sch; Girkau Skiyar Tudu; Girkau Shiyar Galadima; Gidan Garso, Tashar Kalgo; Sabon Gari Zugou Pry Sch; Jabga, Jabga Pry Sch; Indire, Shiyar Hakimi; Tugar Kabawa, Dan Garkar Boka; Zugun Kebbe S/Hakimi; Zugun Kebbe, Zugun Kebbe Pry Sch
Rabah	Rabah	Shiyar Majikira - A. Rabah; Shiyar Majikira - B. Rabah; Shiyar Galadima - Rabah; Shiyar Rafi - Rabah; Shiyar Magaji A. Rabah; Shiyar Magaji B Rabah; Kogogo Hakimi; Jiccini; G. G. C Rabah; Kokogo Dutse; Sabon Gari Rabah
Rabah	Riji/Maikujera	Shiyar Magaji-Kusaga G. Hakim; Shiyar Hakimi-Bakin Kasuwa; Shiyar Bazai - Shiyargaza; Gidan Mairago - Model Pri. School; Marinawa - Model Pri. School; Guan Danaya-Danfili
Rabah	Rara	Shiyar Yamma - Model Pri. School; Shiyar Yamma - Sh/Galadima; Shiyar Marafa - Adult Edu.; Shiyar Mallamawa - Sh/M; Madawa - P/Sch; Chirib Dikko - Model Pri. School; Tukkuyum - M. P. S; Dawakawa - Model Pri. School; Yola Bogaye - Yola; Dudu/Barade - M. P. S; Sabon Gari
Rabah	Gwaddodi/Gidan Bu Wai	Shiyar Hakimi; Shiyar Bazai; Shiyar Magaji; Shiyar Yari; Shiyar Bango; Angamba; Dan Dalo
Rabah	Gawakuke	Madawa - Madawa; Sardauna - M. P. S; Shiyar Kinari - S/Kinari; Gawakuke; Rabah Maba; Gidan Doka - Gidan Doka; Gidan Almajir - Gidan Almajir; Gidan Magajiya; Gidan Barabo - Gidan Barabo; Shiyar S/Yaki - A/Yaki; Burmawa Barabo - Dan Fili
Rabah	Gandi 'A'	Shiyar Saraduna 'A' M P. S; Shiyar Saraduna 'B'; Shiyar Dan Kadu; Shiyar Ajiya - Shiya Ajiya; Shiyar Galadima; Shiyar Ba'Akale; Shiyar Dandube; Shiyar Dabawa; Dandabbal; Makera; Shiyar Zamawa; Tafawa Ajlia; Ruwan Tsamiya; Warwanna; Ilulu; Gidan Kare; Tafara Yan Ruwa - P. S
Rabah	Gandi 'B'	Dankarmawa; Dangazri - M. P. S; Chakaltu - Chakaltu; Allikiru; Kursa - Krusa; Burwanga - Burwanga; Tabanni - Tabanni; Dankarmawa - M. P. S
Rabah	Tsamiya	Shiyar Dunya; Shiyar Anna; Shiyar Chidawaki; Shiyar Gigane; Shiyar Dan Ali; Lungun Dunya
Rabah	Yar Tsakuwa	Shiyar Ubandawaki; Shiyarajiya; Sabon Gari - Sabon Gari I; Sabon Gari - M. P. S II; Badamma; Tsamawa; Sangiwa M. P. S; Jigara; Rahah - Rahah; Danbanda; Sidingo - Sidingo
Rabah	Kurya	Shiyar Ajiya; Shiyar Rafi; Shiyar Magaji; Shiyar Dan Hajo; Shiyar Kaiwar Dawa; Shiyar Elawo; Kwatte-Magaji-Kwattem Agaji / Shiyar Kwate Magaji
Rabah	Tursa	Sabarru; Gidan Fulani - Gidan Fulani; Tursa; Tumbulla; Rakaka Magaji; Rakaka Buzu
S/Birni	S/Birni East	Pri. School - Takatsaba; Pri. School - Kyara; Garin Namaimai - Garin Namaimai; Pri. School - Bachaka; Garin Buta - Gadin Buta; Pri. School - Kalage; Pri. School - Garin Abara I; Pri. School - Garin Abara II; Pri. School - Maiwa; Pri. School - Chinabarka; Son-Allah - Son Allah; Pri. School - Dankware; Pri. School - Garin Umara; Dangari - Dangari; Sulmawa - Sulmawa; Takatsaba Masallaci - Takatsaba
S/Birni	S/Birni West	Viewing Centre - Shiyar Yakuba; Kofar Na Soro - Shiyar Magaji; Yan-Awaki Pri. School- Shiyar Dan-Baki I; Yan-Awaki Pri. School- Shiyar Dan-Baki II; Maternity - Shiyar Dan-Ilah I; Maternity - Shiyar Dan-Ilah II; Tsamiyar Aguje - Shiyar Dan Galadima I; Tsamiyar Aguje - Shiyar Dan Galadima II; Hande Pri. School - Shiyar Ubandawaki; Gidan Dawai - Gidan Dawai; Magajin Dawaki-Magajin Dawaki; Town Model Pri. School - Shiyar Yakubu; Government Lodge - Shiyar Mallan Kada; Tsamiya Kasuwa - Shiyar Magaji I; Tsamiya Kasuwa - Shiyar Magaji II; Women Centre - Shiyar Dangaladima; G. S. S S/Birni Temgrand
S/Birni	Tsamaye	Amuzawa - Amuzawa; Pri. School - Labau; Gidan Shekarau Danfili; Bawtare - Bawtare; Takasuwa - Takasuwa; Gidan Miko - Gidan Miko; Gidan - Gago - Gidan Gago; Gidan Shekarau Dan Fili; Pri. School - Tsamaye; Dunkudumi - Dunkudumi; Pri. School - Kuru-Kuru; Gidan Dagi - Gidan Dagi; Borai - Borai; Sangu - Sangu; Tsululu Pri. School - Tsululu; Hunkui - Hunkui; Tsamaye Danfili - Tsamaye
S/Birni	Unguwar Lalle	Y. C Kanwuri; Shiyar Gawo; Rimawa; Marina - Marina; Mashaya - Mashaya; Turtsawa - Turtsawa; Sabon Sara - Sabon Sara; Mazau; Mallamawa - Mallamawa; Magarau - Magarau; Kiratawa; Tagirke; Sangerawa; Gidan Gado; Gayya Da Kwari; Tamin Dawa - Tamin Dawa; Buddarawa - Buddarawa; Alumudawa - Alumudawa
S/Birni	Tara	Garin Hillo - Garin Hillo; Dispensary - Shiyar Kofa; Shiyar Bara I; Shiyar Bara II; Garin Zago; Nasarawa; Rambadawa; Tsauna Garin Ango; Gidan Hassan - Gidan - Hassan; Garin Idi Kware - Garin Idi Kware; Garin Idi Tudu; Masallaci - Shiyar Kofa; Shiyar Habibu; Pri. School - Garin Zango; Rambadawa Pri. Sch. - Rambadawa
S/Birni	Gatawa	Pri. School - Shiyar Marafa; J. S. S - Shiyar Magaji I; J. S. S - Shiyar Magaji II; Shiyar Bawa - Gade I; Shiyar Bawa - Gade II; Shiyar Marafa; Dunkawa; Dankura; Gamji; Sangerawa - Sangerawa; Araga; Dama; Gidan Ahtano I; Gidan Ahtano II; Burkusuma; Magira Tudu; Magira Kware; Gyangyadi; Katsallen Kade; Takalmawa - Takalmawa; Asha Banza; Mallamawa
S/Birni	Kurawa	Shiyar Malunfashi; Sabon-Gari-Tasha; Shiyar Sarki; Sarkin Rafi; Garki; Dan - Aduwa; Masallaci - Masawa; Kwatsal; Masawa Dabugi; Kwaren Gamba; Dakwaro; Dogon Marke; Kuzari; Shiyar Sarkin Rafi
S/Birni	Makuwana	Filin Magaji - Shiyar Ladan; Kofar Durumbu - Shiyar Dangaladima; Pri. School - Faru; Alkalawa - Alkalawa; Yarbulutu - Yar-Bulutu; Garin Malamai - Garin Malamai; Zalla Bango - Zalla Bango; Garin Faji; Garin Bature; Jingilma - Jingilma; Danba; Karari - Karari; Zangon Makuwana - Zangon Makuwana; Dan-Gawo; Yar Buluto
S/Birni	Lajinge	Pri. School - Lajinge I; Pri. School - Lajinge II; Pri. School - Dantudu I; Pri. School - Dantudu II; Pri. School - Lanjegu I; Marakawa Danfili; Pri. School - Kadaye; Pri. School - Jijjira; Rumbukawa Kadum - Rumbukawa; Allakiru; Kungurus - Kungurus; Dantudu- Dantudu
Shagari	Jaredi	Jaredi Shiyar Majikira - M. P. S; Jaredi Shiyar Magaji; Tsafari; Nakuzu; Runjin Buzu; Ruggar Gamau; Sire; Ruggar Tudu; Runtuwo; Ludi
Shagari	Horo Birni	Shiyar Dangaladima; Shiyar Magagi - Kasuwa; Shiyar Dikko - Horo Pri. School; Horo Danbaro Shiyar Wali - Shigar Wali; Horo Danbaro Shiyar Uban Dawaki; Sabara M. P. S; Ruggar Yara/Duste; Biri Zango; Kaurare/Kaurare; Gidan Agiggi
Shagari	Dandin Mahe	Shiyar Magaji Mamman/Dandin Mahe; Shiyar Magaji Bawa; Shiyar Galadima; Helmowo / Rumbuki; R/Akali / Sesseda; Mabera, Gidan Salau; Ruggar Malam; Kwaciyo / Lakati; Ginga Kanwuri Maidabo; Ginga Mps; Zango / Kaurare; Asarara; Ruggar Magaji/Kagat; Gwanai; Gwammanan/Ruggar Yamma; Manaji/Ruggar Fako; Gidan Magana; Illela/Era
Shagari	Kambama	Sabon Gari/Shiyar Magaji - Pri. School/Shiyar Magaji Kanbama; Shiyar Dangaladima - Kanbama; Mazoji - Magaji; Sullubawa; Rinaye/Shiyar Tudu; Rinaye - Shiyar Hakimi; Tudun Samberu; Gidan Husaini; Gwargawo
Shagari	Gangam	Gamgam - Model Pri. School; Gamgam - Badi; Ruggar Buda; Takalmawa/Takalmawa; Lungu; Tungar Barki; Aske Dodo; Banga Hurdu; Yandun Daji; Lokoka
Shagari	Lambara	Lambara - Model Pri. School; Lambara - Shiyar Kofar; Illela/Kaura - Illela Dabore; Duwoji / Daljan - Dundeji; Gidan Baura/Ela - Ela; Gidan S/Yaki Badiyawa - Badiyawa; Doruwa - Doruwa; Gidan Tudu/Gidan Ardo-Shiyar Ardo; Bela - Bela; Gidan Mashaya - Shiyar Mashayau; Gidan Bunga/ Garin Bunga; Gidan Gambo - Garin Gidan Gambo; Jandutsi - Shiyar Hakimi; Bakya - Garin Bakya; Guloru - Shiyar Makera
Shagari	Shagari	Shiyar Magaji - Shiyar Shagari; Shiyar Birni - Shagari; G. S. S Shagari; Chofal; Kaura/Shiyar Hakimi; Wanke - Masallaci; Wanke - Makera; Marake Model Pri. School; Gadara - Shiyar Hakimi; Haura - Pri. School; Tungar Bawa - Shiyar Hakimi; Jan Zomo; Sage - Sage Fili; Shagari J. S. S
Shagari	Sanyinnawal	Sanyinnawal - Shiyar Yamma; Sanyinnawal/Kanwuri; Sanyinnawal Yardutsi; Runjin Kaka; Karoga - Shiyar Hakimi; Tofa - Garin Tofa; Baduka/Yola/Nahuce; Kalangu; Kaurare/Yar-Gusau; Bulanyaki/Kabawa - Kabawa; Bulanyaki - Zamfarawa; Bulanyaki/Marina; Karoga - Ppri. School
Shagari	Kajiji	Kajiji - Shiyar Sanna; Kajiji - Shiyar Ajiya Gamagira; Kajiji - Shiyar Ajiya; Kesoje - Shiyar Hakimi; Kesoje - Pri. School; Aggur - Shiyar Hakimi; B / Tudun Shibkau - Sh Hakimi; Gidan Dangara - Gidan Dangara; Gidan Dangara -Shiyar Hakimi; Lafiyar Bature - Pri. School; Busawa Tashar Kajiji; Asarara - Shiyar Hakimi; Rugga Pri School; Kajiji-J. S. S
Shagari	Mandera	Mandera - Shiyar Ajiya; Mandera - Shiyar Zarumai; Hausare - Shiyar Hakimi; Darin Guru - Shiyar Hakimi; Darin Guru - Shiyar Yamma; Gidan Tudu - Shiyar Gabas; Gidan Tudu - Shiyar Sabini Birni; Gidan Buhari; Darhaman; Sebore; Gidan Gayya
Silame	Gande East	Dargana/Model Pri. School; Falanje/Model Pri. School Falanje; Jeringo/Town Field; Kaya/Model Pri. School Kaya; Male/Model Pri. School; Shiyar Mai Yaki/Village Head Off. Gande; Shiyar Mai Yaki/Vmodel Pri. School; Shiyar Mai Kabi/Filin Jariri; Boyin Goje/Shiyar Mashaya; Boyin Goje/Kofar Male; Dargana-Dan Hili
Silame	Gande West	Gaukai/Pri. School; Gaukai/Town Field; Kulalu/Model Pri'School; Chofal Town Field; Gidan Kaya/Town Field; Gaukai Tunga; Gidan Yaya Tankarawa; Gidanyaya Pri. School
Silame	Katami North	Shiyar Magaji; Shiyar Tasalya; Shiyar Tasalya/Filin Na'Akka; Rairan Fulani/Gidan Magaji; Gujiya/Gidan Magaji; Tungar Dadi/Garkar Hakimi; Tungar Atto/Gidan Hakimi; Shiyar Tasalya/Tsohon Kanwuri
Silame	Katami South	Shiyar Gandu/Bakin Koli; Shiyar Gandu/Kalgo; Shiyar Gandu/Dogon Fili; Shiyar Sauna/Kasuwa; Tajenera/Filin Tanera; Shiyar D/Galadima/Booko; Gadambe/Filin Gadambe; Shiyar Zarumai/Ageri
Silame	Kubodu North	Kubodun Sama/Model Pri. School Kubodu; Kubodun Kasa/Model Pri. School; Fakara Buda/Model Pri. School; Shabra Bunari Town Field; Shabra Alkali/Model Pri. School; Kubodun Sama/Pri. School
Silame	Kubodu South	Tozo Shiyar Ma Kada/Pri. School Tozo; Tozo Ka'Isa Wale/Town Field; Jekanadu Birni/Town Field; Gabbuwa/Pri. School Gabbuwa; Tullure / M. P School; Jekanadu Baiche/Pri. School Jekanadu
Silame	Labani	Labani/Model Pri. School; Alfala/Town Field; Kwaggel/Town Field; Betare/Town Field; Galadi/Pri. School; Rumdi/Model Pry Sch.; Rumbuki/Town Field
Silame	Marafa East	Gunkin Magaji/Shiyar Magaji; Danjawo/Shiyar Hakimi; Karangiya/Shiyar Hakimi; Marafa/Adult Education Office; Margai/Shiyar Hakimi; Gungu/Shiyar Hakimi; Gidan Gero/Shiyar Hakimi
Silame	Marafa West	Tungar Abdu/Shiyar Magaji; Tungar Mamba/Shiyar Magaji; Tungar Yaro/Shiyar Magaji; Gidan Tudu/Shiyar Magaji; Maje Shiyar Noma/Burtali; Majen Sanyinna/Shiyar Sanyinna
Silame	Silame	Shiyar Marafa/Women Centre; Shiyar Marafa/Burmawa; Shiyar Bunu/M. P . School; Shiyar Bunu/Marina Silame; Laininkasa/Pri. School Laini; Dankala Dikko/ Town Field; Dalmi/M. P. School; Gyattarana/Town Field; Kamasu/Town Field; Shiyar Bunu/ Model Pri. School
Sokoto North	Waziri 'A'	Garkar Attah; Sahara Danbaba I; Sahara Danbaba II; Sh Danbuwa; Sh/Isah Tsalibawa I; Sh/Isah Tsalibawa II; Gidan Husaini Bazza; Gidan Lumu - Tsohuwar Kasuwa; Sultan Maccido Pri. School I; Sultan Maccido Pri. School II; Gidan Mairabah I; Gidan Mairabah II; Gidan Dankado; Offishin Hakimi - Offshin Hakimi; Gidan Iyaka
Sokoto North	Waziri 'B'	Gidan Ige Malau; Rijiyar Bazza - Rijiyar Bazza I; Gidan Malam Sodangi; Garkar Nawadu; Gidan Hassan Store; Gidan Marafan Kwanna I; Gidan Marafan Kwanna II; Gidan Wazirin Soskoto; Shiyar Sarkin Shanu; Gidan Yusuf Bilya; Gidan Barade K/Rini A; Gidan Barade K/Rini B; Shiyar Abbas Dangaladima; Shiyar Bello Ibrahim; Tudun Uban Doma; G/Garba Jabo; Offishin Hakimi; Offishin Hakimi - Gidan Dan Bature; Rijiya Bazza - Rijiya Bazza II
Sokoto North	Waziri 'C'	Kofar Rini Clinic; Sokoto Cinima - Sokoto Cinama; Fed Saving Bank; Gidan Maitumaki; Sh/Abdu Maiwelder I; Sh/Abdu Maiwelder II; Shiyar. Barau Maikatako; Illela Garage I; Illela Garage II; Shiyar Samaila; Garkar Makwasa; Gidan Mai Nguwa D/Tanin; Shiyhar Malan Jatau; Shyar Malan Labbo
Sokoto North	Magajin Gari 'A'	Magajin Gari 'A' - Magajin Gari 'A'; Magajin Gari 'B' - Magajin Gari 'B'; Garkar Barwa; Garka Yar Magarwa; Garkar Bello Maigoro; Offishini Hakimi 'A'; Offishini Hakimi 'B'; Helele Clinic I; Garkar Mamman Dan Auta; Garkar Sidi Mamman; Garkar Sarkin Fawa; Garkar Idi; Garkar Bello S/Baki; Garkar Ala Aji; Garkar Sajo; Garkar Alkali Malleri; Garkar Mairiga; Garkar Alh. Abu Maibuhu; Hellele Clinic II
Sokoto North	Magajin Gari B	Sh/Arzika Wakili; G/Ladan Local Govt I; G/Ladan Local Govt II; Shiyar Hakimi Jelani - Sh/Hakimi Jelani; Shiyar Hakimi Bala; Shyar /Chika Fanta; Sh/Alh. Dahiru; Sh/Dan Farijo A; Sh/Dan Farijo B; Sh/Abdul Sodangi; G/Inno Yargwamna; G/Isah Shehu Kamba; Magajin Gari M. P. S; Shiyar Tsuho Amali; Marina Asada; Shiyar Hakimi Barmo I; Shiyar Hakimi Barmo II; Shiyar Sule Zoramawa I; Shiyar Sule Zoramawa II; G/Kasimu Tela I; G/Kasimu Tela - II; Sh/Sharu Maikusa; Dan Fili Nufawa I; Dan Fili Nufawa II; Sh/Shehu Kamba; Cimmo Asada; Kuffa - Kuffa; Sh/Abdu Maikifi I; Sh/Abdu Maikifi II; Sh/Hakimi Bulu; Shiyar Dan Inna Tela
Sokoto North	S/Adar/G/Igwai	Sh/Maigoro - Sh/Maigoro; Sh/Aliyu Din Gyadi; Mahotar Dantatumbi A; Mahotar Dantatumbi B Yansanda; University Quarters - University Quarters; Sh/Mai Man Gyada; Runjin Sarki - Runji Sarki; Sh/Malam Bello - Sh/Mal. Bello; Shiyar Mai Kwabo; Nuruwa G/Fadama; Ruggar Gero; Gidan Kuka; Offishin Hakimi Umaru
Sokoto North	Magajin Rafi 'A'	Sh/Sarki D/Bazazzagi I; Sh/Sarki D/Bazazzagi II; Sh/Mazuga A; Sh/Mazuga B G/Daniya; Kufar Rini Sh/Namadina; Sh/Dan Maliki Tsoho; Shiyar Abdullahi Mai Gwandu; Shiyar Maigwandu Madaka; Sh/Mai. Nuhu A; Sh/Mai. Nuhu B Gidan Arzika; Sh/Abdullahi Mega; Offishin Hakimi Tsoho; Offishin Hakimi T G/S/Danko; Sh/Magajin Rafi Tsoho; Sh/S/Sudan
Sokoto North	Magajin Rafi 'B'	Sh/Bello Zoramawa; Prison Yard - Prison Yard; Garkar Dandurbawa; Shiyar Abduwa Taki; Garkar Alkali Yahaya; Shiyar Barumi; Garkar S/Gona; Garkar Kyahie; Sh/Abduwa - Sh/Abduwa Near G/Abduwa/Garkar Abduwa 'A'; Shiyar Abduwa B; Sh/Chika - Sh/Chika Near G/Chika/Garkar Chaka; Chika Market; Offishin Hakimi - Offishin Hakimi; Garkar Alu Magawata; Garkar Zaruku; Shiyar Alkali Amadu A; Shiyar Alkali Amadu B; Garkar Dan Katsina; Garka Dan Durbawa
Sokoto North	S/Musulmi 'A'	G/S/Musulimi - Gidan S/Muslimi; Kofar Bai - Kofar Bai; Gidan Muazu Na Liman; Waje Area Court - Waje Area Court; Sultan Ward Pri. School - Sultan Ward Pri. Sch.; Mamman Kada - Mamman Kada; Gidan Aminu Alkanchi; Kofar Bai - Kofar Bai Dan Hili; Gakrkar Garkuwa Kwandawa
Sokoto North	S/Musulmi 'B'	Offishin Hakimi - Offishin Hakimi; Sh/Mai. Buhari - Sh/Mai. Buhari; Beside Umar Ibn Khadabi Mosque (Federal Saving Bank); Danhili Hubbare; Sh/Maiwurno - Sh/Maiwurno; Sh/Marafa Walijo - Sh/Marafa Walijo; Gidan Mahe Hubbare; Sh/Sarkin Yaki - Sh/Sarkin Yaki
Sokoto North	S/Adar Gandu	Massalacin Yarabawa; Sh/Alh. Abdu - Hajiya Halima; Abdul Nani; Alh. Ada Maifata; Shiyar Mai Fada; Offishin Hakimi Dandare; France Company I; Sokoto Science College; Gandu Pri. School - Gandu Pri. School I; Gandu Pri. School - Gandu Pri. School II; Gandu Pri. School - Gandu Pri. School III; Sh/Sarkin Baki; Aliyu Maigishiri I; Aliyu Maigishiri II; Sh/Sule Mainama - Sh Sule Mainama; Bayan Gidan Marsandi A; Bayan Gidan Marsandi B; Gidan Dare; Aliyu Maigishiri III; France Company II
Sokoto South	R/Dorowa 'A'	Assibitin Kutare; Garka Yawo; Offishin Hakimi I; Offishin Hakimi II; G Dan Goggo; G Dan Lele; Garkar Hali Wangarawa; G. Mai Gwandu; Masallaci N Adamawa; Kasuwa Marina Tsamiya I; Kasuwa Marina Tsamiya II; Garkar Sarkin Tasha I; Garkar Sarkin Tasha II; Garka Maifada; Garkar Sarkin Kudun Gasau I; G. Dan Mairi; Garkar Sarkin Kudun Gusau II; Specialist Hospital
Sokoto South	R/Dorowa 'B'	Tunau Mafara I; Tunau Mafara II; Garki Moyi Kaura; Salihu Anka I; Salihu Anka II; Illela H/Suruwa I; Illela H/Suruwa II; Govt. House; Garka Zarumi; Garkar Amadu Gurzau I; Garkar Amadu Gurzau II; Alh Bakale; Garka Zubairu Tela; P And T I; P And T II; Walin Sokoto; Bath Road; Orphanage; Sheik Gummi I; Sheik Gummi II; Maikahon Karo. I; Maikahon Karo. II; Garka Malam Abi; Kasuwar Rijiya I; Wurin Yan Nama; City Campus I; City Campus II
Sokoto South	T/Wada 'A'	Gidan Na Illo; Garkar Magaji; Isah Na Mallando I; Isah Na Mallando II; G. Sarkin Hausawa I; G. Sarkin Hausawa II; Adult Education; Tudun Wada Adult Education; G. Tukur Dallatu I; G. Tukur Dallatu II; Near Jibril Mosque; Dallatu M. P. S; Riyojin Dan Umma I; Riyojin Dan Umma II; Gawon Dan Nunu I; Gawon Dan Nunu II; Garkar Hayatu I; Garkar Hayatu II; Magajin Rafi M. P. S I; Magajin Rafi M. P. S II; Garkar Mainasara I; Garkar Mainasara II; L. G. E. A; Garkar Dallatu I; Garkar Dallatu II; Tudun Dan Wanzam
Sokoto South	T/Wada 'B'	Bawa Yauri; Tudun Wada Garka Bawa Yauri; Kotun Gulma I; Kotun Gulma II; Ibrahim Dasuki Pri. School I; Ibrahim Dasuki Pri. School II; Govt. Printing Press; Garka Alu Achida I; Garka Alu Achida II; Garki Alhaji Garka Maishayi; Garka Maishayi; Garka Alh.-Labaran I; Garka Alh.-Labaran II; Garka Dahiru Ngaski I; Garka Dahiru Ngaski II; Garka Alh.-Mamman I; Garka Alh.-Mamman II; Garka Alh.-Sambo; Garka Malam Mai Shehi I; Garka Malam Mai Shehi II; Tudun Wada Garka Saidu Dan Sadau; Ibrahim Gasau Nizamiyya I; Ibrahim Gasau Nizamiyya II; Wada Uba Dk I; Wada Uba Dk II; Nagarta College; Ali Akilu Road; Garkar Maiicce I; Garkar Maiicce II
Sokoto South	S/Zamfara 'A'	Takalmawa I; Takalmawa II; Unguwar Malammai I; Unguwar Malammai II; Marinar Kofar Atiku I; Marinar Kofar Atiku II; Kofar Atiku Mai Unguwa I; Kofar Atiku Mai Unguwa II; Ofishin Hakimi I; Ofishin Hakimi II; Muh'D Zako; Abdu Shugaba; Wurin Yan Susu; Balarbaba Gwamna I; Balarbaba Gwamna II; Galadima D/Durumi
Sokoto South	S/Zamfara 'B'	Garki Baban Ladi; Garki Boyi Danjatau; Garki Kabo Yarsharu I; Garki Kabo Yarsharu II; Sokoto Nizzamiya Pri. School I; Sokoto Nizzamiya Pri. School II; Garki Alu Shawa I; Garki Alu Shawa II; Garki Mai Unguwa Atto I; Garki Mai Unguwa Atto II; Northern Cinema; Garki Shugaba Duzu; Garki Haliru Binji; Talatu Yarmaigoro I; Talatu Yarmaigoro II; Garkar Bala Yawuri; Habsatu Girls College; Modi Yabo Tsoho I; Modi Yabo Tsoho II; Sarkin Zamfara Uba; Sarkin Zamfara Yusif D/Hausa J. Allien/Lafiya Hotel I; Sarkin Zamfara Yusif D/Hausa J. Allien/Lafiya Hotel II; Sarikin Zamfara Lafiya Hotel B/Way/N. U. R. T. W; Lafiya Hotel II; N. U. R. T. W I; N. U. R. T. W II; Kaita Yabo I; Kaita Yabo II; Sarikin Zamfara Garka Igen Joji; Garkar-Barki
Sokoto South	Gagi 'A'	Gagi Garka S/Yaki; Gagi Garka Ubandoma; Gagi Garka Marafa; Gagi Gidan Masau; Gagi Mana Babba; Gagi Mana Karam; Gagi Gidan Dilo; Nakasari Pri. Sch; Garkar Jawo; Gagi Tamaje; Gagi School Of Nursing
Sokoto South	Gagi 'B'	Gagi Garkar Abdul Kadir Mabera Mujaya; Gagi Yahaya Gusau Model Pri. School I; Gagi Yahaya Gusau Model Pri. School II; Gagi Garkar Dikko Mabera Mujaya; Gagi Garkar Uban Dawaki; Gagi Federal Govt. College; Gagi Sagagi Kofar Dawayi; Gagi Offa Road; Gagi Garkar Kwaire; Gagi Unguwar Dutse I; Gagi Unguwar Dutse II
Sokoto South	Gagi 'C'	Gagi Tafida Aminu Model Pri. School; Gagi Gidan Jelani M. Jelani I; Gagi Gidan Jelani M. Jelani II; Gagi Govt Girls College I; Gagi Govt Girls College II; Gagi Garkar Sidi; Gagi Mabera Magaji; Gagi Gidan Jariri Pry. Sch; Gagi Gidan Dahala; Gagi Gidan Dan Amiru; Gagi Sabon Gida; M-G. S Awaye
Sokoto South	Sarkin Adar Kwanni	G. Maifada I; G. Maifada II; Marafan Kinanni I; Marafan Kinanni II; Hakimi Tsoho; G. Tambari Tsoho; Tambari Tsoho; S/Yaki Binji; G/B Dan Koli; Bello Kafinta; Sarkin Adar Umaru Shugaba Jegawa I; Sarkin Adar Umaru Shugaba Jegawa II; Sarkin Adar Galadima John Holt; Sarkin Adar Garka Inuwa I; Sarkin Adar Garka Inuwa II; Gidan Akawu Jegawa I; Garka Akawu Jegawa II; Sarkin Adar Garka Longman T/Tasha; Sarkin Adar Hamza Maiunguwa Kwani; Sarkin Adar Sidi Mamman Asarakawa T/Tasha; Sarkin Adar Baturen Kaji Jegawa; Sarkin Adar G/Umaru Police Station; Sarkin Adar Maiunguwa Mainiyo I; Sarkin Adar Maiunguwa Mainiyo II; Sarkin Adar Garka Aliyu Koko Kwani; Sarkin Adar Kwanni Police Station G/Umaru; Sarkin Adar Kwanni Sac I; Sarkin Adar Kwanni Sac II
Sokoto South	S/A/K/Atiku	Sarkin Adar K/Atiku Masallaci Yarbawa I; Sarkin Adar K/Atiku Masallaci Yarbawa II; Sarkin Adar Ofishin Hakimi A/Road; Sarkin Adar Ofishin Hakimi Atiku/Road; Sarkin Adar Kwamberu I; Sarkin Adar Kwamberu II; Sarkin Adar S/Mallammai; Sarkin Adar Garkar Lula Rungumi I; Sarkin Adar Garkar Lula Rungumi II; Sarkin Adar Garkar Bala R/Zaure; Sarkin Adar Garkar Salanke Gidan Salanke; Sarkin Adar Garkar Bellow Isa G/Kanawa; Sarkin Adar Garkar A. Dandare G/Kanawa; Sarkin Adar Garkar Ladan Rungumi; Sarkin Adar Garkar Ali Shina I; Sarkin Adar Garkar Ali Shina II; Sarkin Adar Garkar Shehu Narame I; Sarkin Adar Garkar Shehu Narame II; S/A/K/Atiku Giwa Chemist; S/A/K/Atiku Garkar Uban Doma
Tambuwal	Romon Sarki	Romon Sarki - Yar Kasuwa; Romon Sarki Kantiti; Romon Sarki Kanwuri; Romon Sarki Pri Sch.; Kaya Tsohon Kanwuri; Kaya Barkin Shago; Kaya Pri. Sch; Kaya Shiyar Gabas; Kaya Shiyar Yamma; Barga A' Kanwuri; Barga B' Danfili; Barga Garkar Liman
Tambuwal	Bakaya/Sabon Birni	Bakaya - Bakaya Pri. School; Bakaya - Shiyar Rafi - Garkar Hakimi; Bakaya - Dandinkowu - Danhili; Ruggar Fako - Danhili; Madocci - Madocci Pri. School; Madocci - Kanwuki - Danhili; Romon Liman Titi - Romo Pri. School I; Romon Liman Titi - Romo Pri. School II; Romon Liman S/Galadima - Sch. Galadima; Romon Liman S/Waziri - Sabon Birni Pri. Sch.; Il0ji- Garkar Magaji; Sabon Birni Danhili
Tambuwal	Bashire/Maikada	Maikada - Maikada Pri. Sch.; Gunzu/Zarumai - Gunzu Pri. Sch.; Garba Magaji - Garba Nmagaji Pri. Sch.; Kaurar Adarawa/ - K/Adarawa Kanwuri; Gongar - Yaya/Gidan Makera - Gidan Yaya Pri. Sch.; Gongar Dikko/Dulum - Gongar Dikko Pri. Sch.; Dangasu/Gawakuke - Dangasu G. Hakimipri. School; Bashire Shiyar Magaji - Kanwuri; Bashire Shiyar Gabas - Pri. Sch.; Bashire Shiyar Yamma - Danhili; Masu/Dakaya - Masu Pri. Sch.; Alasan Kunga - Alasan Pri. Sch.; Dakaya/Chofal - Dakaya Danfili; Banga - Banga Pri. Sch.; Labe - Labe Pri. Sch.; Hulkui/Gyarge - Gyarge Pri. Sch.; Modibbo Kada Pri. Sch.; Lalle Pri. Sch.; Unguwar Dan Bagudu Pri. Sch.; Yagawal Pri. Sch.; Zabarma
Tambuwal	Bagida/Lukkingo	Bagida S/Yamma - Danhili I; Bagida S/Yamma - Danhili II; Bagida S/Ubandawaki - Danhili; Dogon Marke - Garka Galadima; Dogon Marke Marke Mallamawa - Danhili; Danmadi - Danmadi Pri. School; Danmadi Kasuwa - Kasuwa; Abdu Jaki - Kasuwa; Lukkingo Makkawa - Kanwuri Lukkingo; Maradu Babba - Maradun Kanwuri; Maradu Babba - Maradun Pri. School; Ganuwa S/Galadima - Ganuwa Pri. School I; Ganuwa S/Galadima - Ganuwa Pri. School II; Ganuwa S/Nahantsi - Danhili; Tulluwa Kanwuri - Tulluwa Pri. School I; Tulluwa Kanwuri - Tulluwa Pri. School II; Maradun Pri. Sch; Jaja Gorgawa - Danfili; Jaja Gorgawa - Pri. School; Luggar Magaji - Danhili
Tambuwal	Tambuwal/Shinfiri	Illela Fako - Danhili; Illela Dalbejiya; Illela Maniya / M. P. S; Illela Rinaye; Kalgawa Tsohuwar Tasha; Kanuri M. P. S - M. P. S Kanwuri; Hausa Dan Mangoro - Danhili; Shiyar Ajiya K. Yamma - Danhili; Shagon Goro - Shagon Goro; Hausawa Lalle - Danhili; Shiyar Ajiya Jni - J. N. I Mps; Kofar Yamma Filin Kwallo - Filin Kwallo; Hausawa Kasuwa Gari; Takalmawa - Dan Fili; Sabongari Dispensary - Dispensary; Sabon Gari Aduwa - Aduwa; Aljannare - Aljannare M. P. S; Dan Yalli Mai Bande Dorowa; Kaurare / Yale - Mps; Shifiri M. P. S. Shinfiri; Garzau; Unguwar Noma - Unguwar Noma; Gangare/Ramun Tama Pri. Sch.; Zomawa Mps - Mps Zomawa; Kargat/ Chakari - Mps Kargat; Rakuma/Mabera - Mps Mabera; Ggss Tambuwal - Gss Tambuwal; Aduwar Yar-A Hole-Aduwa Bakin Titi; Shiyar M Shekari - Danmangoro; Masallacin Dan Gigala; Tambuwal Dariyawa Community Bank
Tambuwal	Faga/Alasan	Samo - Yarkasuwa; Alasan Baici - Danhili I; Alasan Baici - Danhili II; Alasan - Pri. School; Alasan - Danhili Masallaci; Faga - Pri. School; Yaulawa - Danhili; Kokoro - Kasuwa; Kokoro Unguwar Marke - Danhili; Kaurar M-Salihu - Danhili; Bagasakka/Nabari - Bagasakka Kasuwa
Tambuwal	Dogondaji/Sala	Shiyar Dangaladima - Mps; Shiyar Dangaladima - Danhili; Dangarawa - Danhili; Shiyar Turukka - G/Turukka; Ruggar Shauda - Danhili; Shiyar S/Fawa - Yardotsi; Kaura/Baban Idi-Kaura Kanwuri; Mai Kade - Maikade Mps; Kwalkwato-Kwalkwato M. P. S.; Gambu/Badusai - Gambu Danhili; Nasarawa - Danhili; Salah Shiyar Magaji - Kwankwara; Salah Shiyar M. Dikko - Mps; Salah Shiyar M. Dikko -Danhili; Shiyar Fadama/Rafi - Shiyar Ubandoma; Illela/Changwal-Illela Pri. Sch.; Bancho Kere - Mps Bancho; Mana - Mana Danhili; Shiyar Tambari D/Day- Gidan Ruwa; Samma - Samma D/Hili; Gangumma
Tambuwal	Sanyinna	Shiyar Dutsi - Area Office; Wanzammai - Pri. School; Baici S/Gari - Jni Pri. School; Shiyar Malle - Danhili; Kofar Yamma - Dispensary; Kofar Yamma - Danhili; Makera - Model Pri. School; Shiyar Tsibiri - Danhili; Shiyar Fulani - Danhili; Sabongari - Makaranta Manuga; Shiyar Sakkarawa - Adult Education
Tambuwal	Barkeji/Nabaguda	Shiyar Ubandawaki - Barkeji Pri. School; Shiyar Galadima I; Shiyar Galadima-Kanwuri; Shabra Atto/Maikudu Pri. Sch.; Sabawa U/Dorowa - Danhili; Goninge Sabongari - Danhili; Gesebade/Jaja Madi - Danhili; Madara - Madara Pri. School; Kalgon Noma - Kalgo Pri. School; Nabuguda T/Madi Pri. School; Yamadilla/Jamukka - Danhili; Kalgon Rafi - Danhili
Tambuwal	Jabo/Kagara	Shiyar Sarki A - Gidan Ruwa; Shiyar Sarki B - Model Pri. School; Shiyar Yamma - J. N. I; Shiyar Galadima - Mudalia; Shiyar Ubandoma - Danhili; Shiyar Sire/S. Pawa - G. Ardo; Gyartai - Pri. School; Sh. Magaji/S. Pawa - Danhili; Sakanau - Pri. School; Binji/Guraye/R. Biyo - Guraye P/School; Hiliya/Ruggar/Gummi Pry Sch. Hiliya; Gudumawa/Cobaya/G. Magaji-Danhili; Geselodi/Gumasafi/G. Dilodi-Geselodi P/School; Badariya/Kaurare - Danhilin Barde; Chakai/T-Barke - Danhili; Yole/Modi - Sh-Dasara; Tabki/Gidan Manu - Danhili; Balera - Danhili Tudu
Tambuwal	Saida/Goshe	Kurebu/Kokoza - Danhili Kurebu; Garam - Garam Pri. School; Duwatsu/Kuta - Rafin Sanyi Pri. School; Saida/Illela - Saida Pri. School; Gambuwa - Gambuwa Pri. School; Gudum - Gudum Pri. School; Tsiwa/Gidan Budi - Tsiwa Danhili; Goshe/Gidan Zabarma - Goshe Pri. School; Ciriyaje - Ciriyaje Pri. School; Buwade - Budawe Pri. Sch; Tamdamare - Tamdamare Pri. School; Inwala/Ikko Gari - Danhili Inwala; Rarema/Bangi - Danhili Rarema
Tangaza	Tangaza	Shiyar Dangaladima - Pri. School I; Shiyar Dangaladima - Pri. School II; Shiyar Magaji/Nizaniya - Pri. School; Shiyar Sira/Kasuwa Sira; Garin Sarki/Shiyar Hakimi; Gurdan/Bakin Kasuwa; Baidi/Danfili; Rugga Ruwa/Shiyar Hakimi; Bilangi/Bakin Kasuwa; Gohono/Pri. School; Labsani/Pri. School; Gandaba Yamma/Pri. School; Gurami/B/Kasuwa; Sabro/Bakin Rijiya; Barkatube/Bakin Kasuwa; Ayama/Pri. School; Shiyar Dangaladima Pri. School III; Shiyar Dangaladima Pri. School IV; Shiyar Sira - Shiyar Hakimi
Tangaza	Ruwa-Wuri	Ruwa Wuri - Pri. School I; Ruwa Wuri - Pri. School II; Tsoni Gabas - Pri. School; Sarma Kwalluwa/Shiyar Hakimi; Sarma Tudu - Pri. School; Tuni Gara - Pri. School; Tuni Gara -Dandfili; Sabiyo - Pri. School I; Gwargawo - Shiyar Hakimi; Bagida, Pri. School; Sarma Malgatawa - Shiyar Hakimi; Ruwa Wuri - Pri. School III; Sabiyo - Pri. School II
Tangaza	Raka	Raka - Pri. School; Raka Dutsi - Danfili; Ladindo - Shiyar Hakimi; Gandaba Gabas - Pri. School; Bilangawa - Shiyar Hakimi; Dabagi - Pri. School; Madarare - Pri. School; Raka Danfili
Tangaza	Salewa	Salewa - Pri. School; Bauni - Dispensary; Gwabro - Shiyar Hakimi; Chekehe - Pri. School; Kyenga - Dispensary; Bauni - Danfili; Zurmuku - Dispensary
Tangaza	Gidan Madi	Shiyar Hakimi - Pri. School I; Shiyar Dangaladima - Islamiya School; Shiyar Mai Unguwa - Danfili I; Saraku/Falale - Danfili; Gidan Dadi - Bakin Kasuwa; Tsalibawa - Danfili; Gidan Mallam - Pri. School; Surun Giyal Danfili; Shiyar Mai Unguwa - Danfili II; Shiyar Hakimi - Pri. School II
Tangaza	Sutti	Sutti - Pri. School; Bakyarma - Pri. School; Alela - Danfili; Rimi - Danfili; Tsitse - Danfili; Tudun Ruwa - Danfili; Kwarakka - Pri. School; Bararrahe - Pri. School; Chingora
Tangaza	Kwacce-Huru	Kwacce Huru - Pri. School; Sildewo - Shiyar Hakimi; Arabar Birni - Danfili; Arabar Daji - Danfili; Ganajaye - Pri. School; Ramu Cera - Pri. School; Kwannawa - Pri. School
Tangaza	Kalanjeni	K/Basharu - Pri. School; K/Magaji - Danfili; Gidima Danfili; Adarawa - Pri. School; Badeji - Pri. School; Kalanjeni Maiburgame
Tangaza	Magonho	Magonho - Pri. School; Sanyinna - Pri. School; Kwalajiya - Danfili; Kwaifa - Dan Fili; Aliya Hausawa - Danfili; Gongono - Pri. School; Tungar Yalli - Danfili; Takkau - Pri. School; Dan Kuzut - Dan Fili; Jigo - Shiyar Hakimi; Ginjo - Dispensary; Wayage - Pri. School; Takkau - Dispensary
Tangaza	Sakkwai	Sjiyar Dangaladima - Pri. School; Shiyar Ajiya Dipsensary; Shiyar Magaji Dan Fili; Nkuru - Pri. School; Kandam - Dispensary; Alkasum - Pri. School; Gongono - Pri. School; Kaurawo - Pri. School; Mulawa - Dispensary; Wasanniya -Dispensary; Mano - Pri. School; Kambana - Dispensary; Malgam - Dispensary; Tukandu Dan Fili; Kawuri - Pri. School; Bwagwal
Tureta	Duma	Boka Hammadawa - Boka Hammadawa I; Boka Hammadawa - Boka Hammadawa II; Duma - Pri. School; Duma - Bakin Kasuwa; Gidan Yausi - Gidan Yus I; Wantere; Wumumu - Wumumu
Tureta	Lofa	Didi Gamji - Didi Gamji; Didi Gamji - Didi Alfa; Lofa - Pri. School; Modomawa - Pri. School; Lofa Gidan Gulbi; Lofa Shiyar Makada
Tureta	Barayar Giwa	Barayar Giwa - Barayar Giwa; Birisawa - Birisawa; Dan Gulbi; Mall Amji
Tureta	Fura Girke	Fura Girke - Pri. School; Fura Girke - Fura Girke; Garbe Kanni - Garbe Kanni; Jankware - Jankware; Randa - Rand; Dan Fili Fura Girke
Tureta	Lambar Tureta	Lambar Tureta - Pri. School I; Lambar Tureta - Pri. School II; Lambar Tureta - Asibiti; Gidan Gar Kuwa - Gidan Garkuwa; Kamfanin Ala - Kam Fani Ala; Kamfanin Diya - Kamfanindiya; Tudun Iye - Tudun Iye; Lambar Tureta - G. S. S Tureta
Tureta	Tureta Gari	Shiyar Rafi - Shiyar Rafi; Yargardaye - Yargardaye; Yar Kofar - Yarkofa I; Yar Kofar - Yarkofa II; Dankore - Dankore; Gidan Sule - Gidan Sule; Gangamawa - Gangamawa; Rafin Buda - Rafin Buda; Dundufa - Dundufa; Bela -Bela
Tureta	Kuruwa	Kuruwa - Pri. School; Kawara - Kawara; Galadummai - Galadummai; Ali Sharuwa - Achi Asharuwa
Tureta	Gidan Kare/Bimasa	Bimasagari - Bimasa Gari; Bima - Shiyar Sarkin Aski; Bimasa Taisha - Pri. School; Bagirbi - Pri. School; Mahuta - Mahuta; Gidan Kare - Pri. School; Dorawa - Dorawa; Janwake - Janwake; Tarana - Tarana
Tureta	Kwarare	Kaura - Kwarare Pri. School I; Kaura - Kwarare Pri. School II; Kaura Nizzamiyya; Gidan Ba'Are; Rafin Gora - Rafin Gora
Wamakko	Arkilla	House No 7, Abuja Rd; Rijiya House Gwiwa; M. P. S. Gwiwa; Gidan Dan Kaduna Sama Road; M. P. S Dorowa Road; Sama Road Junction; Kware Road I; Kware Road II; M. P. S Sect. Road I Zuru Road; M. P. S. Gidan Salanke; Dunguza Magaji House; Dunguza Dangawo I; Dunguza Dangawo II; Mini Market Tanki I; Mini Market Tanki II; House No. 107 Gwiwa Low Cost; Gwiwa L Ow Cost Near Water Tank; Kwatar Kwashi Road; Gidan Nufawa; Federal Low Cost Arkilla; Arkilla Liman; Arkilla Magaji; Gdss Arkilla; Bado Uku-Uku Pri. Sch.; Clapperton Road; Gawon Nama Market; Zaga Road; Luggu Area; M. P. S Sect. Road II; Darul Quran; Shiyar Hakimi Nasarawa; H. B. Cas Gate H. B. Cas; T/Mafara Junction - T/Mafara Road; Cement M. P. S - Wurno Road; Near Nuru Yakin Msq. Parliamentary Qts; Zagga Road Gawon Nama; Guiwa-Polo Club
Wamakko	Bado/Kasarawa	Shiyar Hakimi Adarawa; Shiyar Hakimi Badon Barade; Near Water Tank Bado Qts; Shiyar Rafi Badon Rafi; Shiyar Magaji Badon Rafi; M. P. S Bini - Bini; C. O. E Clinic S. S. We; Shiyar Hakimi Gandun Ardo; T. V Viewing Centre Kasarawa; M. P. S Kasarawa - Kasarawa; Shiyar Hakimi Kauran Mal. Garba; Shiyar Hakimi Maganawa; Shiyar Hakimi Nufawa; A. B. A Gate I; A. B. A Gate II; Shiyar Hakimi Runjin Gidado
Wamakko	Gumbi/Wajake	M. P. S Barkeji - Barkeji; Shiyar Hakimi Gandu; Shiyar Hakimi Gidan Baduwa; Shiyar Hakimi Gidan Boka; District Head Office Gumbi; M. P. S Gumbi - Gumbi; Shiyar Hakimi Wajeke; M. P. S Yarabba - Yar-Abba; Shiyar Hakimi Yarabba; Shiyar Hakimi Gidan Ali
Wamakko	Kalambaina/Girabshi	M. P. S Bakinkusu - Bakin Kusu; Mobile Gate - Mobile Police Qts.; Shiyar Hakimi Gidan Fulani; Shiyar Hakimi Girabshi North; Shiyar Hakimi Girabshi South; Shiyar Hakimi Kalambaina; Yarkulu Market Shiyar Marafa; Shiyar Hakimi Gantsare; Shiyar Hakimi Gidan Gamba
Wamakko	G/Hamidu/G/Kaya	Anguwar Ruwa; Gidan Alkali; Gidan Habibu 'A'; Gidan Habibu 'B'; Gidan Hamidu; Gidan Karo; Gidan Kaya; Gidan Yumfa; Ruggan Kalgo; Runjin Gazau; Yaurawa; Zabarmawa; Bagayawa; Maidaji Kasuwa; Gidan Sarkin Pawa
Wamakko	G/Bubu/G/Yaro	M. P. S. Dutsin Majema; Hergeza Dutse; Hergezar Marmaro; Gidan Bubu; Gidan Tudu; Gidan Yaro; Gwanfara - Dangara; Gwanfar Gebe; Kwalkwalawa; Runjin Yamma; Sabon Gari; Tunga; Safatawa; Gidan Assarki
Wamakko	Wamakko	Shiyar Hakimi Boyen Dutsi; M. P. S Boyen Mari - Boyen Mari-Mari; Shiyar Hakimi Gidan Jadji; Shiyar Hakimi Gidan Bazanfare; M. P. S Mankeri - Mankeri; Shiyar Hakimi Tungar Magaji; Leprosium Office Wamakko; Shiyar Barade Wamakko
Wamakko	Dundaye/Gumburawa	Bindigawa; M. P. S. Dundaye (Formerly Dan Tawa); Dundaye Filin Datsa 'A' & 'B'; Kanen Turu Cikin Gari; Maginawa; Shiyar Magaji; Unguwar Lalle; Tambaranga M. P. S.; Kanen Turu Hausawa; Danjawa (Formerly Kanan Turu); Gidan Dan Idi; Giniga; Gumburawa; Shama; Tangwale; Snr Staff Qtrs; Jnr Staff Qtrs Udus; Yar Kanta; Gidan Aku; Siri; M. P. S Yar Labbe I; M. P. S Yar Labbe II; Shiyar Hakimi Yra Labbe; Kanen Turu Masalaci; Gawon Tomo; Gwar Gawu; Gidan Danjada
Wamakko	K/Kimba/Gedewa	Asari Runji; Asari Zamfara; Badononi Godori; Ba'Dononi - Kokani - Kokani; Boyen Kabawa; Daranye Birni; Daraye Kaura; Geddawa Gidan Hakimi; Dedewa Pry Sch; Gano; Shiyar Hakimi Mairuwa/Gidan Shifkau; Daraye Sunkoba; Kaura Kimba; Lailabwa; Lugyyare Ibbi; Lungu - Rafi; Macijin Abdu; Runjin Biyu; Tugal Baso; Wulure
Wamakko	Gwamatse	Dankyal; Diddiba; Gidan Kaduna; Gwamatse; Huchi; Kurun Guho; Lagau; Samalu Pry Sch; Samalu Shiyar Hakimi; Yartunga; Fakara; Gwamatse Shiyar Hakimi
Wamakko	Kammata	Gatare; Mps Kammata - Kammata; Fanari Kaura Abduwa; Lokobi Mania; Lokobi Kanawa; Lungun Alkali; Ruggar Model Pry Sch; Mps Yarume - Yaruman D/Galadima Pry Sch; Yarume Rafi
Wurno	Magarya	Magary Kawurin S/Gobor; Shiyar Bindigawa/Shiyar Bindigawa; Shiyar Sarkin Ruwa/T. V Centre; Shiyar Rafi/Shiyar Rafi; Sabon Garin Doka/Shiyar Doka; Sabon Garin Doka/Shiyar Doka (Yarbuje)
Wurno	Dankemu	Shiyar Magaji/Shiyar Magaji; Shiyar Wakili; Wanu/Gundu/Anza; Mallamawa/Dangida; Magaji/Adakanta; Tambara/Salum; Project Dabagin Isaa; Sidingo
Wurno	Dimbiso	Dimbiso Shiyar Shugaba; Dimbiso Shiyar Sarkin Ruwa; Nasarawar Bazai; Duhuwar Maranawa; Duhuwar Gumsa; Gidan Kamba / Bango
Wurno	Kwargaba	Shiyar Dan Galadima/Kinargaba; Dan Kogi/Ka Wadata / Akalawa Kinargaba; Barayar Zaki/Shiyar Dan Galadima; Arba Rafi/Magaji; Dabagin Yari/Dabagin Basau; Sabon Garin Daje; Lugu Shiyar Magaji; Lugu Shiyar Rafi; Tuttudawa; Gidan Modi; Danbaso; Shiyar Dan Galadima II Kinargaba II
Wurno	Chacho/Marnona	Shiyar Dangaladima/Kanwuri; Shiyar Ardo Makaranta; Zangon Tudu Makaranta; Gidan Tudu Makaranta; Munki Makaranta; Sabon Gari Raba /Kanwuri; Gawo/Kanwuri; Kadagiwa/Makaranta; Tambagarka/Kanwuri; Shiyar Sardauna/Kasuwa; Shiyar Usman/Kanwuri; Koliyal/Kanwuri; Dabagin Bum/Kanwuri; Sabon Birni/Kaurame Kasuwa; Digim/Kanwuri
Wurno	Dinawa	Shiyar Sarkin Yaki; Shiyar Tawaga; Gidan Koro Village; Shiyar Sarkin Rafi; Shiyar Doka; Gangu Dabagi
Wurno	Achida	Makaranta/Makaranta I; Kasuwa/Kasuwa; Kanwuri/Kanwuri I; Marinawa/Marinawa; Yarkaro; Shiyar Ajiya/Shiyar Ajiya; Makaranta/Makaranta II; Kanwuri/Kanwuri II; S/Magina-Marnawa
Wurno	Alkammu/Gyelgyel	Shiyar Ubandawaki/Shiyar Ubandawaki; Shiyar Hakimi; Shiyar Sarkin Yaki; Kaurare; Kofar Gumborawa; Boraye; Gyel Gyel; Kandam; Yantabau; Gidan Inda; Dabagin Kukuta; Unguwar Mata
Wurno	Lahodu/G/Bango	Lahodu; Kau Rare; Mahichi/Mahichi; Gidan Magaji; Gidan Bango; Barnawa; Shiyar Galadima; Gidan Isa; Badawa/Badawa; Kaurar Gabas; Rugga; Dabagi/Dabagi Kanwuri; Gidan Modi
Wurno	Kwasare/Sisawa	Shiyar Danbarara; Shiyar Uban Dawaki; Guntu Gida/Guntu Gida; Tudun Mallame; Adarawa; Shiyar Sisawa; Yarlabe; Gumborawa; Gidan Fako; Shiyar Dan Barara/Shiyar Danbarara 'B'
Yabo	Fakka	Shiyar Sarkin Burmi Fakka; Shiyar Sabon Gari; Shiyar Shamaki; Ruggar Kaya; Shiyar Fada Gudurega/Gudurega; Shiyar Ajiya/Gudurega; Koyo/Koyo/Olo Bawa/Gidan Hammadu; Birni Usman; Fakka/Kwak Kwanawa
Yabo	Bingaje	Bengaje/Tagule; Lambogel/Busa; Dono/Jakiri; Gwargawo/Gwargawo Faidau Kwaino; Labas/Labas Chanchama; Sabara K/Gari; Adiga/Makera, Adiga
Yabo	Torankawa	Torakawa Shiyar Lelaba; Shiyar Galadima Torankawa; Gamma/Gama/Gama-Gama; Bul-Buli/Bul-Buli; Muza/Kurebu; Dagwarga Dikko/Dagwarga Dikko; Dagarga/Dagwarga Ubandawaki; Bawa Bisa/Gidan Gamji; Gela Tofarka
Yabo	Ruggar Iya	Ruggar Iya; Danballo/Danballo; Daga Shiyar Magaji Maizane; Yar Cera; Magabcin Sarki; Zezi/Rugaldu; Muzuru Gidan Galma; Zamfarawa/Tsira Mudu; Ruggar Gabasmagabun Marafa; Gomara/Kaurataba Ketare; Ruggar Kijo
Yabo	Yabo 'A'	Shiyar Fegin Rafi/S/Fawa; Shiyar Ubanda Waki/G/Liman; Shiyar Magaji /G/S/Muza; Addan/Shiyar Sarkin Dutse; Mazaren Gabas/ G / Hakimi; Bulla Gas / P/S; Babban Rumji Pry Sch; Mazaren Yamma/Garkar Hakimi; Addan Shiyar Hakimi; Shiyar Fegin Rafi / J. N. I P/S
Yabo	Yabo 'B'	Shiyar Ajiya /G/ Sarkin Kabi; Shiyar Wambai Wambai P/S; Baice /G/ Hakimi; Baice/Masallaci Gabas; Baware/Garkar Hakimi; Kaura/Kaura Pri. School; Shiyar Ajiya Mps Yabo; Shiyar Hakimi/Ruggar Kambu /G/ Hakimi
Yabo	Kilgori	Nizamiyya Kilgori; Kilgori/Model Pri. School Kilgori; Kwaidazadikko / Kwaidaza Marafa; Dagel / Kaura Dagel / Marafa; Alkaije; Zage/Kuringa
Yabo	Birniruwa	Rungumi/Birninruwa/Dagoyi/Rungumi; Birnin Ruwa/Dogoyi/Rungumi; Gidan Basa/Rinaye/Manawa; Kanfatare; Birsawa/Dalijen; Kuma Toyi Barade / Kumatoyi Maiyaki
Yabo	Bakale	Bakale/Bakale/Ruggar Yauta/Dorai; Bakale/ Yauta/Dorai; Tudun Bakale/Tudun Bakale; Tudun Jadda; Bazar/Bazar; Shabra Lokoko; Dan Chebode/Dan Chebode; Gun Guma/Gunguma; Shabra Magaji; Bakale/Dorai
