= 2019 Sokoto State gubernatorial election =

2019 gubernatorial election in Sokoto State, Nigeria

- March 9, 2019
Nominee	Aminu Tambuwal	Ahmad Aliyu
Party	PDP	APC
Running mate	Manir Dan Iya	Faruk Malami Yabo
Popular vote	512,002	511,660
Governor before election
Aminu Tambuwal
APC
Elected Governor
Aminu Tambuwal
PDP

The 2019 Sokoto State gubernatorial election occurred in Nigeria on March 9, 2019. Incumbent Sokoto State Governor Aminu Tambuwal won re-election for a second term, defeating Ahmad Aliyu of the APC and several minor party candidates.

Aminu Tambuwal was returned as the PDP candidate with Manir Dan Iya as his running mate. Ahmad Aliyu was the APC candidate with Faruk Malami Yabo as his running mate. 51 candidates contested in the election.

== Electoral system ==
The Governor of Sokoto State is elected using the plurality voting system.

== Primary election ==
=== PDP primary ===
Aminu Tambuwal was returned as the PDP candidate with Manir Dan Iya as his running mate.

=== APC primary ===
The APC primary election was held on September 30, 2018. Ahmad Aliyu won the primary election polling 2,282 votes against 3 other candidates. His closest rival was Faruk Yabo who came second with 837 votes, Abubakar Gumbi, came third with 70 votes, while Abubakar Gada had 20 votes.

== Results ==
A total number of 51 candidates registered with the Independent National Electoral Commission to contest in the election. The total number of registered voters in the state was 1,887,767, while 1,083,413 voters were accredited. Total number of votes cast was 1,067,990, while number of valid votes was 1,036,336. Rejected votes were 31,662.

Candidate	Party	Votes	%
Aminu Tambuwal	All Progressives Congress	512,002	49.41
Ahmad Aliyu	People's Democratic Party	511,660	49.37
Other candidates		12,674	1.22
Total		1,036,336	100.00
Valid votes		1,036,336	97.04
Invalid/blank votes		31,662	2.96
Total votes		1,067,998	100.00
Registered voters/turnout		1,887,767	56.57
Source: TheNation

=== By local government area ===
Here are the results of the election by local government area for the two major parties. The total valid votes of 1,036,336 represents the 51 political parties that participated in the election. Green represents LGAs won by Aminu Tambuwal. Blue represents LGAs won by Ahmad Aliyu.

LGA	Aminu Tambuwal PDP		Ahmad Aliyu APC		Total votes
LGA	#	%	#	%	#
Binji	13,406		11,216		
Bodinga	21,725		21,078		
Dange Shuni	23,409		23,990		
Gada	24,598		30,981		
Goronyo	19,915		20,867		
Gudu	15,077		12,233		
Gwadabawa	21,866		24,928		
Illela	20,977		26,540		
Isa	24,009		16,830		
Kebbe	9,751		11,820		
Kware	20,197		19,212		
Rabah	14,551		17,946		
Sabon Birni	34,282		32,257		
Shagari	18,222		19,656		
Silame	16,757		12,845		
Sokoto North	36,813		33,442		
Sokoto South	40,337		36,092		
Tambuwal	44,474		30,473		
Tangaza	17,661		16,374		
Tureta	13,255		11,510		
Wamako	26,392		35,251		
Wurno	14,201		20,391		
Yabo	13,405		16,122		
Totals	327,229		184,281		670,878
