= List of cities and towns in Sokoto State =

This is a list of populated places in Sokoto State, Nigeria. It is not complete but includes the most populated cities, towns and villages.

- Gwadabawa
- Salame
- Gigane
- Asara
- Chimmola
- Mamman Suka
- Gidan Kaya
- Tambagarka
- G-Tudu (Gidan Tudu)
- Arbukwe
- Makwa
- Gwazange
- Satuka
- Boto
- Kiso
- Kolfa
- Kiwo-Allah
- Kafin-Chana
- Kafin-Sarki
- Udan-Marki
- Filask
- Bamgi
- Balle
- Gurdan
- Rafin-Kudu
- Manu
- Katami
- Gande
- Maikulki
- Binji
- Almaji
- Sutti
- Ayama
- Illela
- Rumji
- T. Bako
- Wamako
- Dingyadi
- Bodinga Chilgari
- Shunni
- Waura
- Gada
- Kurawa
- Sabon Birni
- Souloulou
- Yerimawa
- Makamawa
- Gauro
- Goronyo
- Shinaka
- Gigawa
- Wurno
- Marona
- Rabah
- Maikujera
- Gandi
- Tsamia
- Bageya
- Kelarel
- Sainyinan Daji
- Kunkundo
- Yabawa
- Lofa
- Bwoka-Noma
- Shagari
- Jabo
- Chakai
- Dogon-Daji
- Masana
- Tambulwal
- Maikada
- Masu
- Kebbe
- Kajiji
- Birjingo
- Jammali
- Inname
- Samama
- Soro
- Takatuku
- Gari
- Mazan
- Sifawa
- Lukuyawa
- Rudu
- Sabaru
- Yokuba
