= Isa, Nigeria =

Town and local government area in Nigeria

Isa
- LGA and town
- Interactive map of Isa
- Location within Nigeria
- Coordinates: 13°12′1″N 6°24′26″E
- Country: Nigeria
- State: Sokoto State

Government
  - Local Government Chairman: Shareef Abubakar Kamarawa

Area
  - Total: 2,158 km^{2} (833 sq mi)

Population (2006 Census)
  - Total: 146,103
  - Density: 67.70/km^{2} (175.3/sq mi)
- Time zone: UTC+1 (WAT)
- 3-digit postal code prefix: 842
- ISO 3166 code: NG.SO.IS

Isa is a town and Local Government Area of Sokoto state, Nigeria. It shares borders with Shinkafi in Zamfara State, Goronyo and Sabon Birni from west and north respectively in Sokoto and the Republic of Niger in the east.

It has an area of 2,158 km^{2} and a population of 146,103 at the 2006 census.

The postal code of the area is 842.

The Isa LGA is made up of the capital town of Isa and other towns and villages such as Turba, Bafarawa (birthplace of former Sokoto State governor and 2007 presidential candidate Attahiru Bafarawa). Historically, the area was a part of the ancient kingdom of Gobir and is inhabited by members of the Gobirawa and Fulani ethnic groups.

== Climate ==
The climate has two distinct seasons, with temperatures ranging from 60 °F to 104 °F during the hot, oppressive wet season and sweltering, windy dry season. The hottest month in Isa is April, with an average high temperature of 103 °F and low temperature of 79 °F. The cool season lasts for 1.6 months, from December 10 to January 30, with an average daily high temperature below 90 °F. January is the coldest month in Isa, with an average low temperature of 61 °F and high of 87 °F. The hot season lasts for 2.3 months, from March 18 to May 26.
