= Makwa, Nigeria =

Town in Sokoto State, Nigeria

Makwa (also spelled as Makwia) is a town in Sokoto State, Nigeria. It is located at approximately 13°20′39″N 04°15′30″E, and has a population of roughly 3,000.
