= Silame =

- LGA and town
- Interactive map of Silame
- Location within Nigeria
- Coordinates: 13°2′N 4°51′E
- Country: Nigeria
- State: Sokoto State

Government
  - Local Government Chairman: Abubakar Mohammed Daftarana

Area
  - Total: 790 km^{2} (310 sq mi)

Population (2006)
  - Total: 104,378
  - Density: 130/km^{2} (340/sq mi)
- Time zone: UTC+1 (WAT)
- 3-digit postal code prefix: 853
- ISO 3166 code: NG.SO.SI

Silame is a town and Local Government Area in Sokoto State, Nigeria on the Sokoto River.

It has an area of 790 km^{2} and a population of 104,378 at the 2006 census.

The postal code of the area is 853.

== Climate ==
There is a wet season that is hot and oppressive and a dry season that is hot and partly cloudy throughout the year.

Silame's climate is changing dramatically as a result of climate change, with the region experiencing a shift toward warmer, more consistent temperatures.
