= Yabo, Nigeria =

Yabo
- LGA and town
- Nickname: Yabo Garin Moyijo
- Interactive map of Yabo
- Location within Nigeria
- Coordinates: 12°43.15′N 5°00.37′E
- Country: Nigeria
- State: Sokoto State

Government
  - Executive Chairman: Muhammad Abubakar
  - Member State House of Assembly: Hon. Abubakar Shamaki Yabo

Area
  - Total: 789 km^{2} (305 sq mi)

Population (2006)
  - Total: 115,011
  - Density: 146/km^{2} (378/sq mi)
- Time zone: UTC+1 (WAT)
- 3-digit postal code prefix: 851
- ISO 3166 code: NG.SO.YA

Yabo is a town and Local Government Area in Sokoto State, Nigeria. Yabo Local Government is one of the oldest local governments in Sokoto.

It has an area of 789 km^{2} (305 sq mi) and a population of 115,011 at the 2006 census.

The postal code of the area is 851.

== History ==
The people of Yabo under the leadership of their king and scholar, Muhammadu Moyijo played a pivotal role towards Islamic teaching, reformation and establishment of Sokoto Caliphate led by Sheik Uthman Bn Fodiyo. Moyijo was a close friend, companion and supporter of Sheik Uthman Bn Fodio. He accompanied Sheik in several of his Islamic outings and spread his teaching around his localities. On his way to Zamfara, Shehu met Moyijo at a village called Magali where they discussed important issues related to Islam and calling people towards Islam. Their meeting point is historically marked and even today the acclaimed Sheik Fodiyo's well and a tree under which Sheik Fodiyo teaches his followers still exists in Magabcci. In view of his vast knowledge in both Islamic teachings, administration and defence, Moyijo was appointed as the leader as well as the Flag bearer in-charge of Kebbi.

== Climate ==
The climate has two distinct seasons: a scorching, oppressive rainy season with predominantly cloudy skies, and a scorching, partly cloudy dry season with temperatures ranging from 17 °C (62 °F) to 39 °C (103 °F).
