= Sokoto North =

- LGA
- Interactive map of Sokoto North
- Coordinates: 13°03′N 5°14′E
- Country: Nigeria
- State: Sokoto State
- Capital: Sokoto

Government
  - Local Government Chairman: Jamilu Umar Gosta

Area
  - Total: 51 km^{2} (20 sq mi)

Population (2006)
  - Total: 232,846
  - Density: 4,600/km^{2} (12,000/sq mi)
- Time zone: UTC+1 (WAT)
- 3-digit postal code prefix: 840
- ISO 3166 code: NG.SO.SN

Sokoto North is a Local Government Area in Sokoto State, Nigeria. Its headquarters is in the state capital of Sokoto.

It has an area of 51 km^{2} and had a population of 232,846 at the 2006 census.

== Climate/Geography ==
Sokoto North LGA has an average temperature of 33 degrees Celsius or 91.4 degrees Fahrenheit and a total area of 51 square kilometres or 20 square miles. The LGA is a part of the Sudan Savannah and experiences two distinct seasons: the rainy and the dry. The average wind speed in the LGA is 11 km/h or 6.8 mph.
