= Tureta =

- LGA and town
- Interactive map of Tureta
- Location within Nigeria
- Coordinates: 12°35′22″N 5°32′49″E
- Country: Nigeria
- State: Sokoto State

Government
  - Local Government Chairman: Aliyu Abubakar

Area
  - Total: 2,383 km^{2} (920 sq mi)

Population (2006)
  - Total: 68,370
  - Density: 28.69/km^{2} (74.31/sq mi)
- Time zone: UTC+1 (WAT)
- 3-digit postal code prefix: 852
- ISO 3166 code: NG.OG.TT

Tureta is a town and Local Government Area in Sokoto State, Nigeria. It shares a border with Zamfara State in the south and east. They are mainly Hausa people predominantly Burmawa. Islam is the main religion, fishing and farming are the major occupations. As of 2026, Dr Muhammad Danrabi Tureta is the king of Tureta with the title as Sarkin Burmin Tureta.

Tureta has an area of 2,383 km^{2} and a population of 68,370 at the 2006 census.

The postal code of the area is 852.

== Climate ==
The average temperature ranges from 17 °C (62 °F) to 39 °C (103 °F), with the wet season being hot, oppressive, and mostly cloudy, and the dry season being hot and partly cloudy.
