= Dange-Shuni =

- LGA
- Interactive map of Dange-Shuni
- Location within Nigeria
- Coordinates: 12°51′N 5°21′E
- Country: Nigeria
- State: Sokoto State
- Headquarter: Dange

Government
  - Local Government Chairman: Hon. Aminu Magaji Bodai

Area
  - Total: 1,210 km^{2} (470 sq mi)

Population (2006)
  - Total: 194,546
  - Density: 161/km^{2} (416/sq mi)
- Time zone: UTC+1 (WAT)
- 3-digit postal code prefix: 852
- ISO 3166 code: NG.SO.DS

Dange-Shuni is a Local Government Area in Sokoto State, Nigeria. Its headquarters are in the town of Dange.

It has an area of 1,210 km^{2} and a population of 194,546 at the 2006 census.

The postal code of the area is 852.

== Climate ==
The climate varies throughout the year between a wet season that is primarily cloudy and a dry season that is mostly hot and partly cloudy.

=== Temperature ===
In Dange, the months with the highest average daily highs exceeding 38 °C (100 °F) are April and January, respectively. April is the hottest month.
