= Sokoto South =

- LGA
- Interactive map of Sokoto South
- Location in Nigeria
- Coordinates: 13°03′N 5°13′E
- Country: Nigeria
- State: Sokoto State
- Headquarter: Sarkin Zamfara

Government
  - Local Government Chairman: Yau Mohammed Danda

Area
  - Total: 41 km^{2} (16 sq mi)

Population (2006 census)
  - Total: 194,914
  - Density: 4,800/km^{2} (12,000/sq mi)
- Time zone: UTC+1 (WAT)
- 3-digit postal code prefix: 840
- ISO 3166 code: NG.SO.SS

Sokoto South is a Local Government Area in Sokoto State, Nigeria. Its headquarters is in Sarkin Zamfara.

It has an area of 41 km^{2} and a population of 194,914 at the 2006 census.

== Climate/Geography ==
The Sokoto South LGA has an average temperature of 33 degrees Celsius or 91.4 degrees Fahrenheit and a total area of 41 km squared (16 square miles). The Sudan Savannah includes the LGA, which experiences two distinct seasons: the dry and the wet. The average wind speed in the LGA is 11 km/h or 6.8 mph.

The postal code of the area is 840.
