= Tambuwal =

- LGA and town
- Motto(s): Tambuwal Garin Gogarma, Garin Buhari Dan Shehu ( Home to Buhari bn Shehu bn Fodiyo )
- Interactive map of Tambuwal
- Location within Nigeria
- Coordinates: 12°19′N 4°48′E
- Country: Nigeria
- State: Sokoto State

Government
  - Local Government Chairman: Abba Shehu Tambuwal

Area
  - Total: 1,717 km^{2} (663 sq mi)

Population (2006 Census)
  - Total: 224,931
  - Density: 131.0/km^{2} (339.3/sq mi)
- Time zone: UTC+1 (WAT)
- 3-digit postal code prefix: 850
- ISO 3166 code: NG.SO.TW

Tambuwal (also known as Tambawal and Tambawel) is a town and Local Government Area on the A1 highway in Sokoto State, Nigeria.

It has an area of 1,717 km^{2} and a population of 224,931 at the 2006 census.

The postal code of the area is 850.

== History ==
Tambuwal was founded by Muhammad Bukhari, a noted poet who was the son of Usman dan Fodio. He was the fief's first emir, and all its subsequent rulers descend from him.

The current Sarkin Tambuwal is Alhaji Ahmed Dahiru Tambuwal, 18th Sarkin Tambuwal.

== Climate ==
There is a wet season that is hot and oppressive and a dry season that is hot and partly cloudy throughout the year.

=== Temperature ===
The rising temperatures, heat waves, and extreme weather events that characterise Tambuwal's climate have an impact on social viability and affect different regions differently, emphasising the need for adaptation strategies.
