= Binji =

Settlement in Nigeria

- LGA and town
- Interactive map of Binji
- Location within Nigeria
- Coordinates: 13°13′N 4°55′E
- Country: Nigeria
- State: Sokoto State

Area
  - Total: 559 km^{2} (216 sq mi)

Population (2006)
  - Total: 105,027
  - Density: 188/km^{2} (487/sq mi)
- Time zone: UTC+1 (WAT)
- 3-digit postal code prefix: 853
- ISO 3166 code: NG.SO.BI

Binji is a town and Local Government Area in Sokoto State, Nigeria. It was originally established by the sons of the military commander Ali Jedo as a Ribat.

It has an area of 559 km^{2} and a population of 105,027 at the 2006 census. The postal code of the area is 853.

== Climate ==
The average annual temperature is 17 °C (63 °F); the wet season is humid, oppressive, and generally cloudy; and the dry season is hot, muggy, and partially cloudy.

=== Temperature ===
Throughout the month, Binji experiences a range of temperatures, the most prevalent being hot days and cool nights.
