= Gada, Nigeria =

Gada Ta Dangani garin Chaddukal
- LGA and town
- Interactive map of Gada
- Location within Nigeria
- Coordinates: 13°46′N 5°40′E ̇
- Country: Nigeria
- State: Sokoto State

Area
  - Total: 1,315 km^{2} (508 sq mi)

Population (2006)
  - Total: 248,267
  - Density: 188.8/km^{2} (489.0/sq mi)
- Time zone: UTC+1 (WAT)
- 3-digit postal code prefix: 843
- ISO 3166 code: NG.SO.GA

Gada is a town and one of the 23 Local Government Area in Sokoto State, Nigeria. It has eleven (11) Political wards namely: Gada, Kyadawa-Holai, Ilah-Dukamaje, Gilbadi, Kaffe, Tsitse, Kadadi, Kadassaka, Kaddi, Kiri and Kwarma respectively.

Gada shares a border with the Republic of Niger to the north. It has an area of 1,315 km^{2} and a population of 248,267 at the 2006 census.

The postal code of the area is 843.
