= Rabah =

- LGA and town
- Interactive map of Rabah
- Location within Nigeria
- Coordinates: 13°7′N 5°31′E
- Country: Nigeria
- State: Sokoto State

Government
  - Local Government Chairman: Yusuf Muhammad Rabah

Area
  - Total: 2,433 km^{2} (939 sq mi)

Population (2006 Census)
  - Total: 149,165
  - Density: 61.31/km^{2} (158.8/sq mi)
- Time zone: UTC+1 (WAT)
- 3-digit postal code prefix: 842
- ISO 3166 code: NG.SO.RA

Rabah is a town and Local Government Area in Sokoto State, Nigeria.

It has an area of 2,433 km^{2} and a population of 149,165 at the 2006 census.

The postal code of the area is 842.

Rabah was the home town of Sir Ahmadu Bello the first Premier of Northern Nigeria. He succeeded his father as the head of Rabah District in 1934. It also is an Arabic name (Rabah)

== Climate ==
The climate has a sweltering, cloudy dry season with temperatures ranging from 17 °C (62 °F) to 40 °C (104 °F), as well as a hot, oppressive wet season with mostly cloudy skies.

=== Temperature ===
The average temperature in Rabah is 27 °C (80 °F) at lows and 40 °C (104 °F) at highs, with April being the hottest month.
