= Kebbe =

- LGA and town
- Interactive map of Kebbe
- Location within Nigeria
- Coordinates: 12°08′N 4°44′E
- Country: Nigeria
- State: Sokoto State

Government
  - Local Government Chairman: Abdullahi Yarima Kebbe

Area
  - Total: 2,618 km^{2} (1,011 sq mi)

Population (2006)
  - Total: 124,658
  - Density: 47.62/km^{2} (123.3/sq mi)
- Time zone: UTC+1 (WAT)
- 3-digit postal code prefix: 850
- ISO 3166 code: NG.OG.KE

Kebbe is a town and Local Government Area in Sokoto State, Nigeria. The LGA shares a border with Zamfara State in the east and Kebbi State in the south and west.

It has an area of 2,618 km^{2} (1,011 sq mi) and a population of 124,658 at the 2006 census.

The postal code of the area is 850.

== Climate ==
The climate features a hot, unpleasant rainy season with predominantly cloudy skies and a blistering, partly cloudy dry season with temperatures ranging from 18 °C (65 °F) to 39 °C (103 °F).
