= Wamako =

- LGA and town
- Interactive map of Wamako
- Location within Nigeria
- Coordinates: 13°2′16″N 5°5′37″E
- Country: Nigeria
- State: Sokoto State

Government
  - Local Government Chairman: Umar Ahmad Dundaye

Area
  - Total: 697 km^{2} (269 sq mi)

Population (2006)
  - Total: 179,619
  - Density: 258/km^{2} (667/sq mi)
- Time zone: UTC+1 (WAT)
- 3-digit postal code prefix: 840
- ISO 3166 code: NG.SO.WA

Wamako is a town and Local Government Area on the Sokoto River in Sokoto State, Nigeria.

== History and Geography ==
It has an area of 697 km^{2} and a population of 179,619 at the 2006 census. The concentration of wealth, prestige, the political power and religious learning centers in Wamakko attracted large numbers of rural-urban migrants, both from the neighboring state and from distance regions. Presently the ongoing projects in Wamakko are Sokoto State University, National Youth Services Corps camp (NYSC), Amusement Park. As of 2010 the research conducted by National Bureau of Statistics, the estimated rural –urban migrants in the area is about 4,536 and it's increasing at the rate of 10% annually. Local government is mainly populated by Hausa people. It also comprises four villages: Kammata, Gwamatse, Kauran Kimaba and Kokani Cidawa. The inhabitants are mostly farmers and animal rearers but the initial inhabitants were Sulubawa but now the area were dominated by Hausa.

The postal code of the area is 840.

== Climate ==
The climate has a blistering, cloudy dry season with temperatures ranging from 17 °C (62 °F) to 41 °C (105 °F), as well as a hot, oppressive wet season with generally cloudy skies.

=== Temperature ===
The temperature trend in Wamako indicates a positive trend toward warmer temperatures, with colder conditions becoming more prevalent over time.
