= Goronyo =

Town in Sokoto State, Nigeria

- LGA and town
- Interactive map of Goronyo
- Location within Nigeria
- Coordinates: 13°27′11″N 5°40′35″E
- Country: Nigeria
- State: Sokoto State

Government
  - Local Government Chairman: Bashir Balla V

Area
  - Total: 1,704 km^{2} (658 sq mi)

Population (2006 Census)
  - Total: 182,296
  - Density: 107.0/km^{2} (277.1/sq mi)
- Time zone: UTC+1 (WAT)
- 3-digit postal code prefix: 842
- ISO 3166 code: NG.SO.GO

Goronyo is a town and Local Government Area in Sokoto State, Nigeria. It has an area of 1,704 km^{2} and a population of 182,296 at the 2006 census. The postal code of the area is 842.

The LGA is the location of the Goronyo Dam, upstream of Goronyo town to the east.

== Climate ==
The climate has two distinct seasons, with temperatures ranging from 62 °F to 105 °F during the hot, oppressive wet season and blistering, windy dry season.

=== Temperature ===
In Goronyo, the months of April and January have the greatest and lowest temperatures respectively throughout the year.
