= Muhammadu Namoda =

Leader of the Alibawa Fulani and commander in the Sokoto jihad (died 1810)

- Sarkin Zamfara
- Born: Muhammad bin Ali
- Died: 1810; Kiyawa, Zamfara
- Dynasty: Alibawa
- Military career
- Allegiance: Sokoto Caliphate
- Conflicts: Sokoto Jihad; Battle of Fafara; Battle of Daura; Battle of Dankama; Siege of Alkalawa (1808)

Muhammadu Namoda (born Muhammad bin Ali; died 1810) was a Fulani military leader of the Alibawa clan from Zamfara. Nicknamed "the Victorious", he played a leading role in the Sokoto Jihad and was among the earliest and most active commanders in the jihadist army. He led the Alibawa forces beyond the Rima valley, and contributed to the establishment of the emirates of Katsina and Daura, and served as one of the principal commanders during the final siege of Alkalawa. After his death in 1810, his descendants were conferred the titles of Sarkin Zamfara at Zurmi and Sarkin Kiyawa at Kaura Namoda, the latter of which was named in his honour.

== Life ==
Muhammadu Namoda was a Fulani from the Alibawa clan. They were mainly centered around the Zamfara region in the upper Rima valley. In the late 18th century, they appear to have quarrelled with the ruler of Gobir, Nafata, whose power over the region was weakening amidst growing unrest among the Zamfarawa. Nafata reportedly killed the Alibawa leader (Ardo) Ali al-Faris. When Usman dan Fodio launched his jihad in Gobir calling for 'pure' Islamic rule in Hausaland, he received strong support from the Alibawa Fulani, now led by Namoda. They were one of the four major Fulbe clans that formed the backbone of Usman's jihadist army in Gobir and Zamfara, alongside the Konni, Kebbi, and Sullubawa.

Nicknamed "the Victorious", Namoda was widely praised in jihadist sources and was among the most active commanders in the army. His first major victory seems to have been the Battle of Fafara in 1806. Following a jihadist victory at Gwandu in late 1805, the Gobir army gathered a large coalition including Tuaregs, Burmawa, Katsinawa of Kiyawa, and rebellious Zamfarawa under their Sarki Abarshi to attack the Alibawa base at Zurmi. Ardo Namoda met them near Fafara and won a crushing victory. The battle effectively ended Zamfarawa resistance to jihadist rule. The Tuareg factions also took no major campaigns against the jihadists for the rest of the year, eventually seeking peace the following year.

Soon after Fafara, Namoda went to Daura to support Usman's flag-bearer Mallam Ishiaku in conquering the chiefdom in 1806–7. He left a contingent of Alibawa Fulani in the town to assist the new emir establish his rule. Namoda then led the Alibawa to Katsina in support of another flag-bearer, Umaru Dallaji. In early 1808, following a fierce battle at Dankama, the jihadist forces completely routed the Katsina army, killing the Sarkin Katsina and many of his chiefs. Later that year, Namoda took part in the expedition to the Gobir capital of Alkalawa. He led the Zamfara contingent, while Dallaji commanded the Katsina force, and the Sokoto army was under Muhammad Bello and Supreme Commander Ali Jedo. Alkalawa was surrounded and fell on 3 October 1808, marking the end of Usman's jihad.

Namoda was killed in 1810 during a siege on the rebellious Zamfara fortress of Kiyawa. His head was reportedly placed in a drum "which was beaten on ceremonial occasions by his enemies, an insult which was later revenged by his brother." When Bello became Caliph, he conferred the titles of Sarkin Zamfara on the senior branch of Namoda's family, who were based at Zurmi, and of Sarkin Kiyawa on his brother Mamudu, who eventually captured the fortress.

According to some sources, Namoda was married to Usman's daughter Hannatu, a full sister of Bello.

The town of Kaura Namoda is named after him. Kaura meaning "warlord" in Hausa.
