= Battle of Tabkin Kwatto =

Battle in the Fulani War

- Part of Jihad of Usman dan Fodio
Date	21 June 1804
Location	Lake Kwatto, Gobir 13°29′10.4″N 4°45′19.2″E
Result	Decisive Sokoto victory

Belligerents
Gobir; Kel Gress Tuaregs; Sullubawa Fulanis	Sokoto Caliphate; Agali and Adar Tuaregs

Commanders and leaders
Yunfa	Abdullahi dan Fodio; Ali Jedo; Muhammad Bello

Strength
1000+ infantry large force of light cavalry Tuareg camel corps 100 heavy cavalry	light infantry of mostly archers 20+ light cavalry

Casualties and losses
Heavy	Unknown
- Location within Nigeria

Battle of Tabkin Kwatto (lit. 'Battle of Lake Kwatto') was the first decisive battle in the Fulani War. Abdullahi Ibn Fodio and Umaru al Kammu engaged the numerically superior Gobir cavalry at Kwatto Lake near the Capital fort of Gobir; Alkalawa. The Fulani archers employed a square formation which they successfully defended against successive charges by the Gobir cavalry. After taking severe losses, the death of the commander of Gobir's Armoured Cavalry eventually sealed the fate of the Gobirawa.

Tabkin Kwatto is remembered as the turning point in the history of the Fulani War. The archer-foot lightly armed Fulani proved themselves effective against the well armed Hausa cavalry.
