= Ali Jedo =

1st supreme commander of the Army of the Sokoto Caliphate

Amir al-jaish al-Islam Supreme Commander of the Army
- In office 1805–1846/1849
- Monarchs: Uthman (1805-1817); Muhammad Bello (1817-1837); Atiku (1837-1842); Ali bin Bello (1842-1846/1849)
- Preceded by: position established
- Succeeded by: Abu Hasan bin Ali Jedo

Personal details
- Born: Konni
- Died: 1846 or 1849 Iname, Konni
- Spouse: Fatima bint Uthman Fodio

Military service
- Battles/wars: Battle of Tabkin Kwatto (1804); Kebbi expedition Battle of Alwassa (1805); Battle of Alkalawa (1808)

Ali Jedo (died 1846 or 1849), was the first Amir al-jaish al-Islam (supreme commander of the army or Sarkin Yaƙi) of the Sokoto Caliphate. Prior to the jihad, he was the leader of the Fulbe of Konni in modern-day Sokoto State.

== Life ==
Ali Jedo was among the first to participate in the jihad in Sokoto during the 19th century. He already commanded an army with its base in Iname in Konni. He was appointed commander of the army by Uthman dan Fodio becoming the Sokoto Caliphate's first commander. Jedo's descendants continued to hold that position till the end of the caliphate in 1903.

Ali Jedo was described as "a fiery warrior with a reputation for hot-headedness". An example of his hot-headedness can be attributed to an oral tradition of when he killed a man from Kebbi who dared enter his home and demanded the return of a borrowed horse. Because of this incident, Shaikh Uthman is said to have refused to see him again. The subsequent Sultans also had trouble in disciplining Ali Jedo.

Abdullahi dan Fodio and Ali Jedo both led Sokoto's expedition into Kebbi in 1805. The capital, Birnin Kebbi, was successfully captured on 13 April of the same year. This success allowed some of the Muslims of Sokoto to move to Gwandu establishing the Gwandu emirate led by Abdullahi. Not long after the establishment of Gwandu, Shaikh Uthman divided the responsibilities of the Caliphate. He gave the west to Abdullahi, the east to his son Muhammad Bello and the north to Ali Jedo. The northern part of the caliphate reached as far as Filingue and Adar. Konni remained under Ali's sphere of influence as he was still recognised as the leader of the Konni Fulbe. Binji was established by the sons of Ali but he remained in Iname, his old base to the east of Binji. King Yunfa's sword was given to Ali and his descendants at Binji hold in custody as the symbol of the Amir al-jaish al-Islam and District Headship of Binji to this day.

Towards the end of his life, as he grew older, Ali used his sons as his deputies and left them in charge of the army. His most senior son Abu Bakr, acting as commander of the army, was killed in a Battle led by Sultan Abu Bakr Atiku. Abu Hasan bin Ali Jedo, another son of his, took over this position as acting Amir al-jaish. Shortly after the fourth Sultan of Sokoto, Ali bin Bello, was appointed in 1842, Ali Jedo retired from his position as supreme commander of the army, leaving its management to his sons. Ali Jedo died thirty years after Uthman dan Fodio in 1846 or seven years after Ali bin Bello's ascension in 1849.

== Kebbi expedition ==
After a Muslim defeat in the Battle of Tsuntua in December 1804, Uthman dan Fodio and his followers stayed in the valley to the west of Alkalawa. In search of food, they continued upriver into Zamfara in January and February. They eventually reached Sabon-Gari and camped there. The Muslims had allies in and around Sabon-Gari with the Emirs of Marafa, Burmi and Donko to the north and south. Even the inhabitants of Zamfara, despite being pagans, were more hostile to Gobir than Uthman and his followers. This was because the Gobirawa, fifty years prior, had sacked the capital of Zamfara and had been regularly raiding the country ever since. The Shaikh was already well known and respected in Zamfara due to his history of teaching and preaching some 35 miles north-east of Sabon-Gari. He was requested to settle a dispute over the election of a new Sarkin Zamfara (king of Zamfara). The Muslims soon started to exhaust their welcome in Zamfara. Towards the end of the dry season, they started to run out of food and supplies.

The expedition into Kebbi started out against Gobir and Kebbi but it later became against local towns in Zamfara. The leaders of this expedition were Abdullahi dan Fodio, the first Grand Vizier and brother to the Shaikh, and Ali Jedo. Birnin Kebbi, capital of Kebbi, was captured with its inhabitants fleeing north upriver. The campaign then proceeded to Gwandu and a permanent settlement was established there. The fertile land at Gwandu allowed the Muslims to grow food.
