= Bawa Jan Gwarzo =

Ruler of Gobir from 1777 to 1790

- Sarkin Gobir

Ruler of Gobir
- Reign: 1777 – 1790
- Predecessor: Gambai
- Successor: Yakuba
- Born: c. 1715
- Died: c. 1790; Alkalawa, Gobir
- Father: Babari
- Other name: Dan Taka'ida

Bawa Jan Gwarzo (c. 1715 – c. 1790) was the ruler of the Hausa kingdom of Gobir from 1777 to 1795. He is remembered for his successful military exploits, particularly the continuation of the expansionist policies of his father, Sarkin Gobir Babari, making Gobir a formidable power in the region. His reign also saw the rise of Usman dan Fodio and his reformist movement.

== Early life ==
Bawa was born around 1715 into the royal family of Gobir. His father, Sarkin Gobir Babari, became the ruler (or sarki) of Gobir after usurping power by murdering his predecessor, his father Uban Iche. Under Babari's reign, Gobir waged war on several surrounding states, including some of its allies. One such ally was Zamfara, whose vast capital was completely destroyed by Babari. Bawa is also remembered for establishing Alkalawa as a new capital for Gobir.

Bawa's bravery on the battlefield earned him the nickname Jan Gwarzo, meaning 'red of undaunted person', a Hausa name reserved for the bravest warriors.

== Reign ==
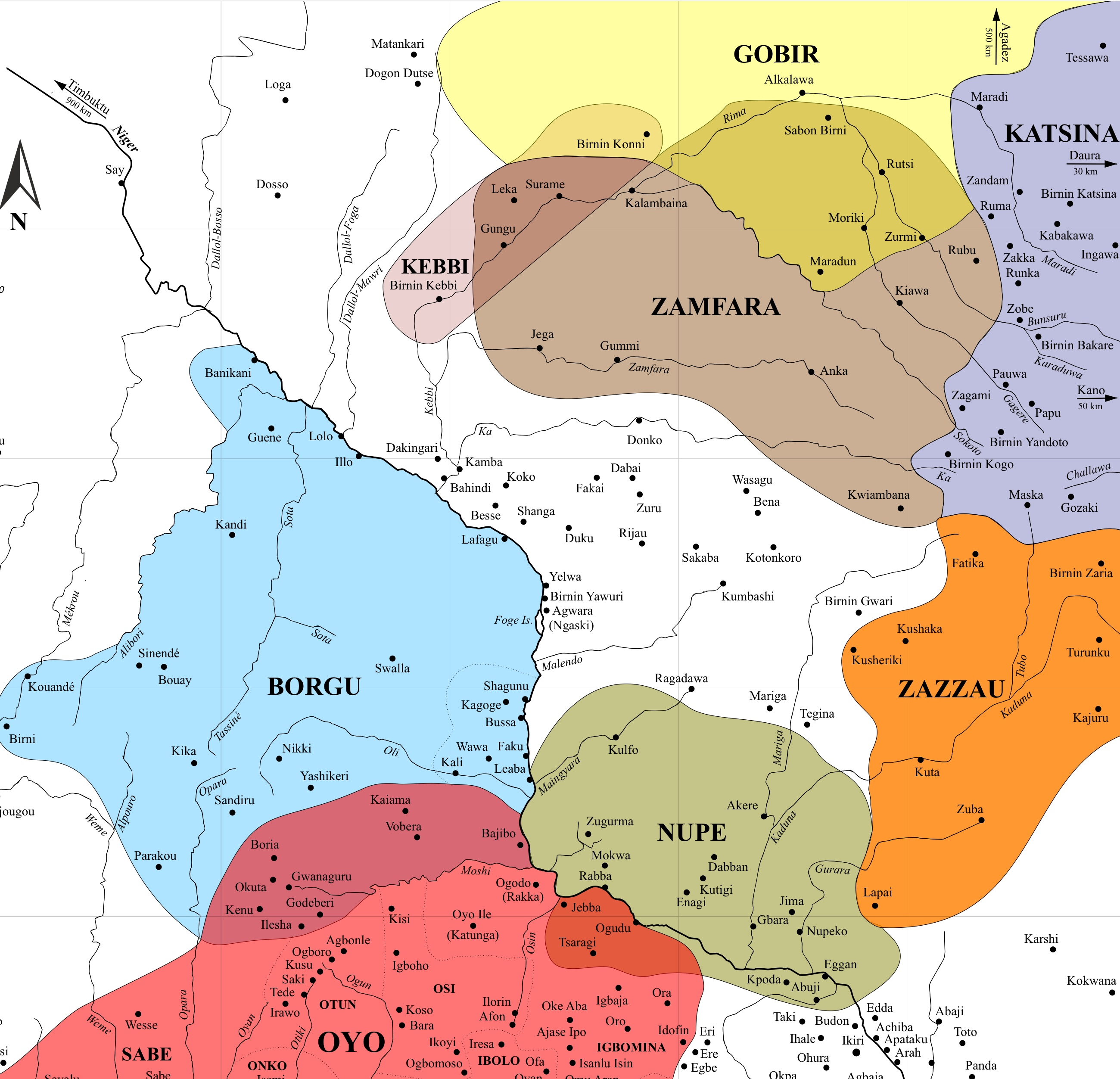
Map of western Hausaland in the late 18th-century

Bawa ascended to the throne in 1777, inheriting the title of sarki and a state already engaged in several military conflicts.

Bawa continued his father's campaign for regional dominance, conducting military expeditions across Katsina, Yauri, Agadez, and parts of Zamfara. He successfully subdued the cities of Maradi, and Birnin Karfi. From Nupe, he extracted tributes that included "five thousand female slaves and five thousand domestic slaves, each of whom brought with him twenty thousand cowries." In return, he sent the Etsu Nupe: "one hundred horses (of which twelve were Bornu stallions) and two beauteous female slaves, each of whom wore bracelets of silk."

The increasing power and influence Gobir gained during Bawa's reign enabled it to be the only Hausa state to refuse to send tribute to the Bornu Empire, asserting its independence.

Despite his many victories, Bawa's ambitions were ultimately checked by his defeat against Sarkin Katsina Agwaragi around 1790. In this battle, whose 'bitterness beggars description' as described by Sokoto chroniclers, his son was slain. Unable to cope with the loss, Bawa died of a broken heart forty days later.

== Relations with Usman dan Fodio ==
One of the defining aspects of Bawa's reign was his relationship with Usman dan Fodio, an Islamic reformer from the Gobir town of Degel. Usman began preaching a return to 'pure' Islam, emphasising strict adherence to Shari'a (Islamic law) and advocating for moral and social reform across Hausaland. His message gained traction throughout the region, at the time mostly among other Islamic scholars.

During the Id al-Kabir festival of 1788-89, Bawa, then around 75 years old, invited Usman to join the Id prayers at Magami. While Bawa's exact intentions are uncertain, tradition suggests he initially planned to kill Usman upon his arrival. However, recognising Usman's growing popularity and the futility of trying to suppress it, Bawa instead negotiated an agreement allowing Usman to continue his teachings. Usman's five requests pertained to the freedom to preach, the treatment of Muslims and prisoners, and taxation.

At the Id prayers, all of Bawa's scholars had abandoned him, joining Usman and his followers, who together numbered around a thousand. Bawa is remembered for publicly pointing to the Shaikh and remarking that the rulers of Gobir who would succeed him would be no more than local heads of Alkalawa.
