= Kingdom of Zamfara =

Hausa kingdom

Kingdom of Zamfara Masarautar Zamfara (Hausa)
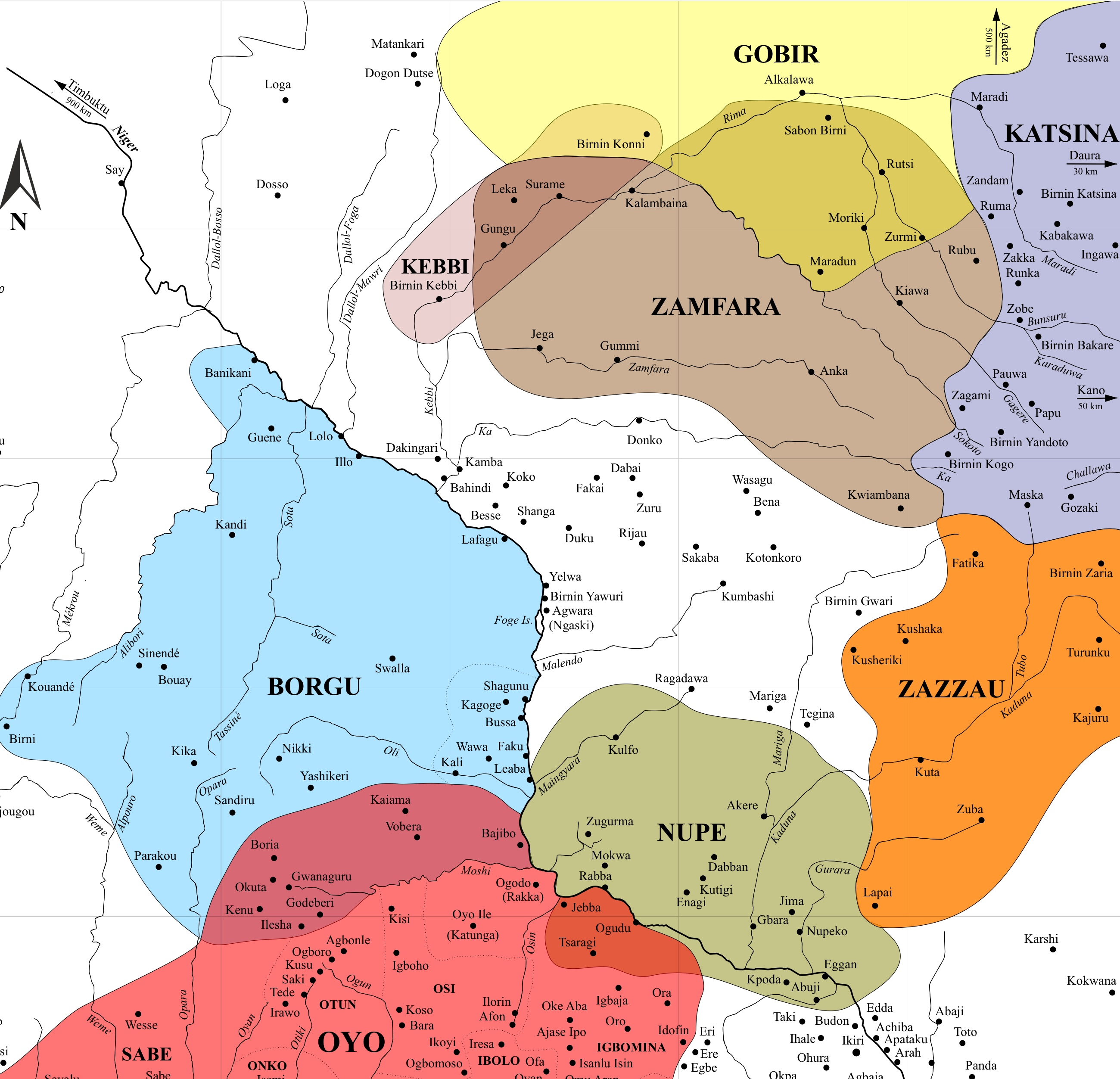
- Map of western Hausaland in 1760
- Capital: Dutsi; Birnin Zamfara; Kiawa; Anka
- Common languages: Hausa
- Religion: Sunni Islam; Hausa animism
- Demonym: singular: Bazamfare; plural: Zamfarawa
- Government: Sarauta
- Sarki
  - before 1300: Dakka I (first)
  - 1899–1903: Abdullahi Gado (last)
Succeeded by
Zamfara Emirate Council
- Today part of: Zamfara State, Nigeria

The Kingdom of Zamfara (Hausa: Masarautar Zamfara) was a Hausa kingdom in what is now northwestern Nigeria. Known for its fertile land, Zamfara became an important player in the regional conflicts and alliances that marked the 17th and 18th centuries Hausaland. However, constant regional instability and warring, particularly with Gobir, gradually weakened the state, leading to its eventual absorption by the Sokoto Caliphate in the 19th century.

== Early history ==
=== Origin ===
The region was first inhabited by the chiefdoms of Dutsi, Togai, Kiyawa/Kiawa, and Jata. The kingdom emerged centred on Dutsi, with its early history prior to 1600 generally consisting of the consolidation of its neighbours.

The Zamfarawa (people of Zamfara) generally claim descent from the Maguzawa hunters who once occupied what would become Kano. This is said to be the origin of the taubastaka (cousinship) that exists between the Zamfarawa and the Kanawa (people of Kano). They first settled at Dutsi, now a town in Zurmi. After seven years without a chief, they appointed Dakka as the first Sarkin Zamfara (lord of Zamfara).

Five more chiefs succeeded Dakka, all male except the sixth, a woman named Algoje. According to legend, these chiefs were giants (Samodawa), with Dakka reputed to have been able to eat a whole ox in one meal and whose shout could be heard in Katsina. Six large mounds of earth in Dutsi are said to be the tombs of these early Zamfara chiefs, twenty-three in total.

From Dutsi, the Zamfarawa moved a few miles north, near the Gagare River, close to present-day Isa in Sokoto. While some claim this relocation happened under their seventh king, Bakurukuru (r. circa 1300), it likely occurred at a much later date, and Mahdi Amadu in the General History of Africa (1984) posits the early 16th century. From this site, they began constructing what would become the large walled town of Birnin Zamfara. The town walls were said to be eleven miles long with fifty gates. Remains of the wall can still be seen to the east of Isa. In the mid-16th century, Zamfara campaigned to the south, reaching Yauri, however they were unable to occupy it permanently.

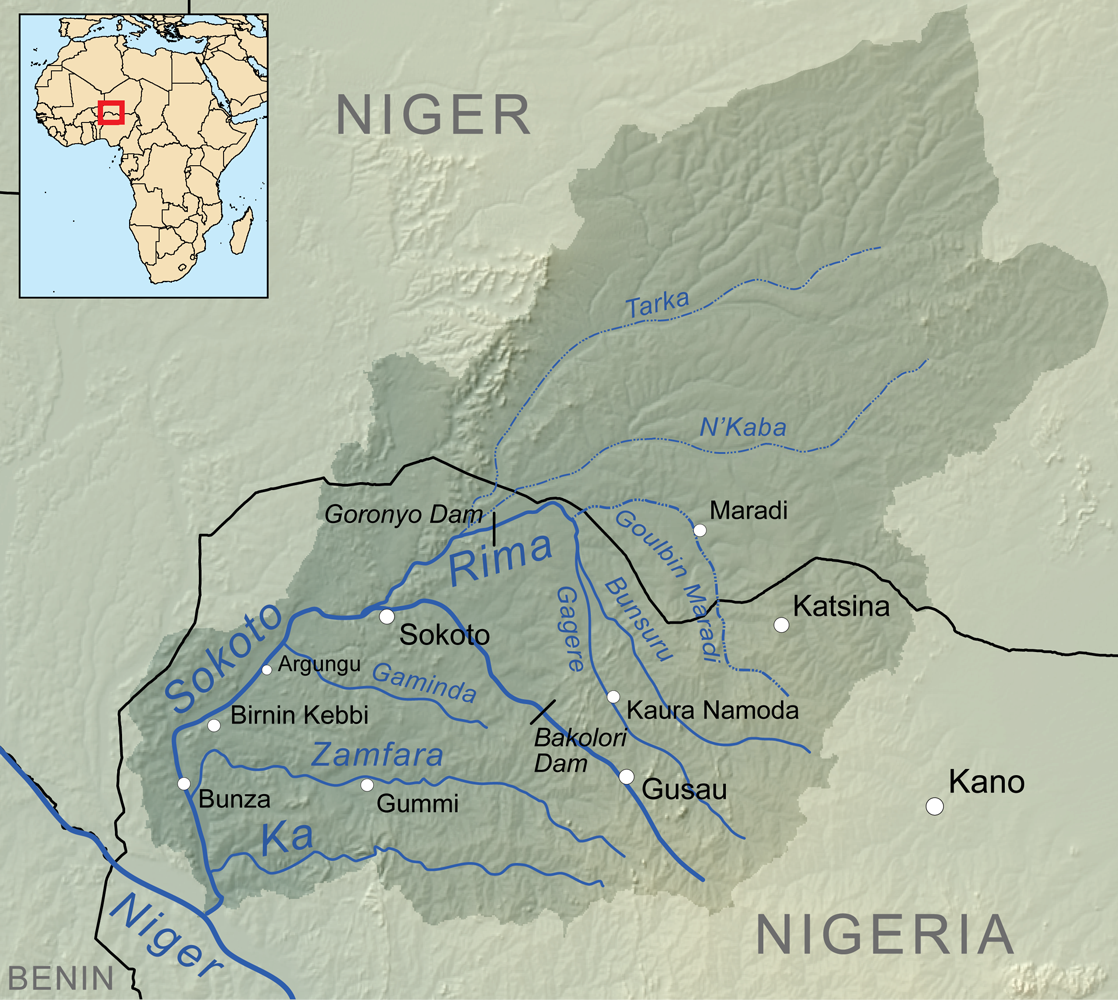
The Sokoto-Rima river basin

According to tradition, the origin of the name Zamfara is linked to a Gobir princess named Fara. She is said to have gotten lost in the bush while fleeing from her husband and was rescued by hunters who took her to their village of Unguwar Maza near Dutsi. The hunters cared for her, and she eventually became pregnant by the youngest among them. Fara later grew homesick and requested to be escorted back to Gobir. Shortly after her return, she gave birth to a child. Grateful for the help provided to his daughter, the king of Gobir granted the hunters all the land between Unguwar Maza and the River Niger. They named it Zamfara, an elided form of mazan Fara ('the men of Fara'), and Birnin Zamfara was built at the spot where the hunters first found her.

Another tradition regarding the origin of the name Zamfara was recorded by Hausa scholar Alhaji Umaru al-Kanawi (1858–1934) in an Ajami manuscript. According to him, a 'new man' (mazan fara) came from the 'bush' (daji) as a hunter, selling his game meat. His settlement eventually grew, and "was called 'Land of the new Man' [kasar mazan fara] and later also Zanfara".

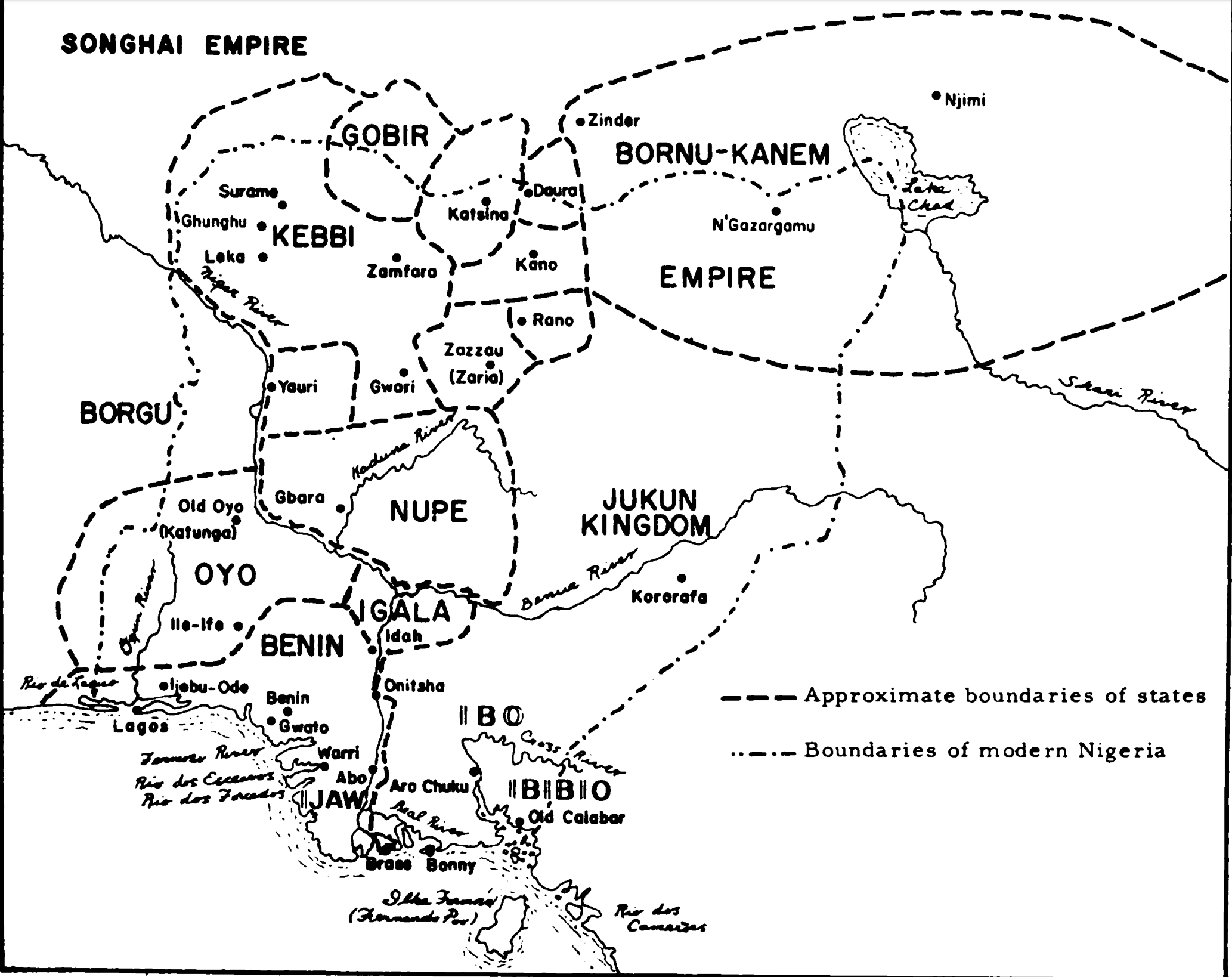
Map of Hausaland in the 16th-century. Zamfara can be seen as a province of Kebbi.

=== 18th-century ===
During the reign of Babba (c. 1715), Zamfara, allied with Gobir and Agadez, revolted against their overlord Kebbi, driving its forces back to the Gulbin Ka River. Led by Babba's son, Yakubu, the combined forces defeated the Kebbawa and captured their king, Muhammadu dan Giwa. During the war with Kebbi, the soothsayers of Zamfara prophesied a disaster unless a slave was sacrificed. Acali, one of Sarkin Zamfara Yakubu's slaves, volunteered his life on the condition that his family would be honoured in remembrance of his sacrifice. Zamfara defeated the Kebbi forces at Tsamiya Maibaura, and Acali's younger brother, Kare, was appointed the first Sarkin Burmin Bakura.

At the height of its power, Zamfara is said to have extended from Sabon Birni in the north to Kwiambana in the south, from the rocks of Muniya, Rubu, and Duru and the Babban Baki stream in the east to the River Gindi in the west. Their successful revolt against Kebbi elevated them to a first-rate power in the region.

Zamfara's fertile land, described by 19th-century German geographer Heinrich Barth as 'almost the most flourishing country of Negroland,' made it attractive to conquerors and migrants. After the Gobirawa were pushed out of the Asben region by the Tuaregs of Agadez, they began settling peacefully in Zamfara in the early 18th century. Sarkin Zamfara Maliki welcomed them as useful warriors, granting them farmland. However, the situation was different on Zamfara's northern border, where the Gobirawa had 'too much nomadic restlessness and pugnacity in their blood to settle for long.'

Under the 90th Sarkin Gobir, Soba, the Gobirawa launched a three-year campaign, plundering lands as far as Ilorin in Yorubaland. After a series of military successes, Soba led his forces to attack Katsina in the mid-18th century and initiated a seven-year siege of the city of Maradi, ultimately failing to capture it. While he was away on this campaign, Agadez attacked the Gobir capital of Goran Rami. The Zamfarawa came to the aid of their new allies, Gobir. Under cover of night, they secretly surrounded the forces of Sarkin Agadez with a fence of thorns before launching an attack, saving the city from plunder.

==== Fall of Birnin Zamfara ====
The 92nd Sarkin Gobir, Babari (r. 1742–1770), continued the violent campaigns of his predecessor, Soba. After 15 years as sarki, Babari began a series of attacks on his Zamfara allies, despite his sister Fara's marriage to Sarkin Zamfara Mairoki. The Zamfarawa "seem to have held their own in these engagements." However, the leaders of the Zamfara army came to resent Mairoki, who was said to taunt them upon their return from battles against Gobir by saying, "You have not caught the tail of the monkey; what have you been doing?"

Eventually, the captains of the army decided to abandon their capital, Birnin Zamfara, to Gobir, even escorting the Gobirawa to Mairoki while shouting, "See, here is the monkey, down to his tail!" According to another account, Birnin Zamfara was so vast that Mairoki, happily playing draughts for three days, was unaware that his army had abandoned him to the Gobirawa. According to Barth, a 'reliable source' informed him that the destruction of Birnin Zamfara occurred around 1756, ninety-seven years before his arrival in Hausaland in 1853. Others claim that the capital was destroyed in 1762.

Mairoki fled to Kiawa, an ancient hill fortress inhabited by Katsinawa, located about twenty miles east of Kaura Namoda. He took refuge with his vassal, Tsaidu. There are varying accounts of Zamfara's history at Kiawa; however, historians S.J. Hogben and A.H.M. Kirk-Greene suggest that Muhammad Bello of Sokoto provided the version that was likely the most accurate. In his Raulat al-Afkari, Bello claims that Sarkin Gobir Bawa Jan Gwarzo (r. 1777–1795) besieged Mairoki in Kiawa for 'fifteen years until at last he got possession of him.'

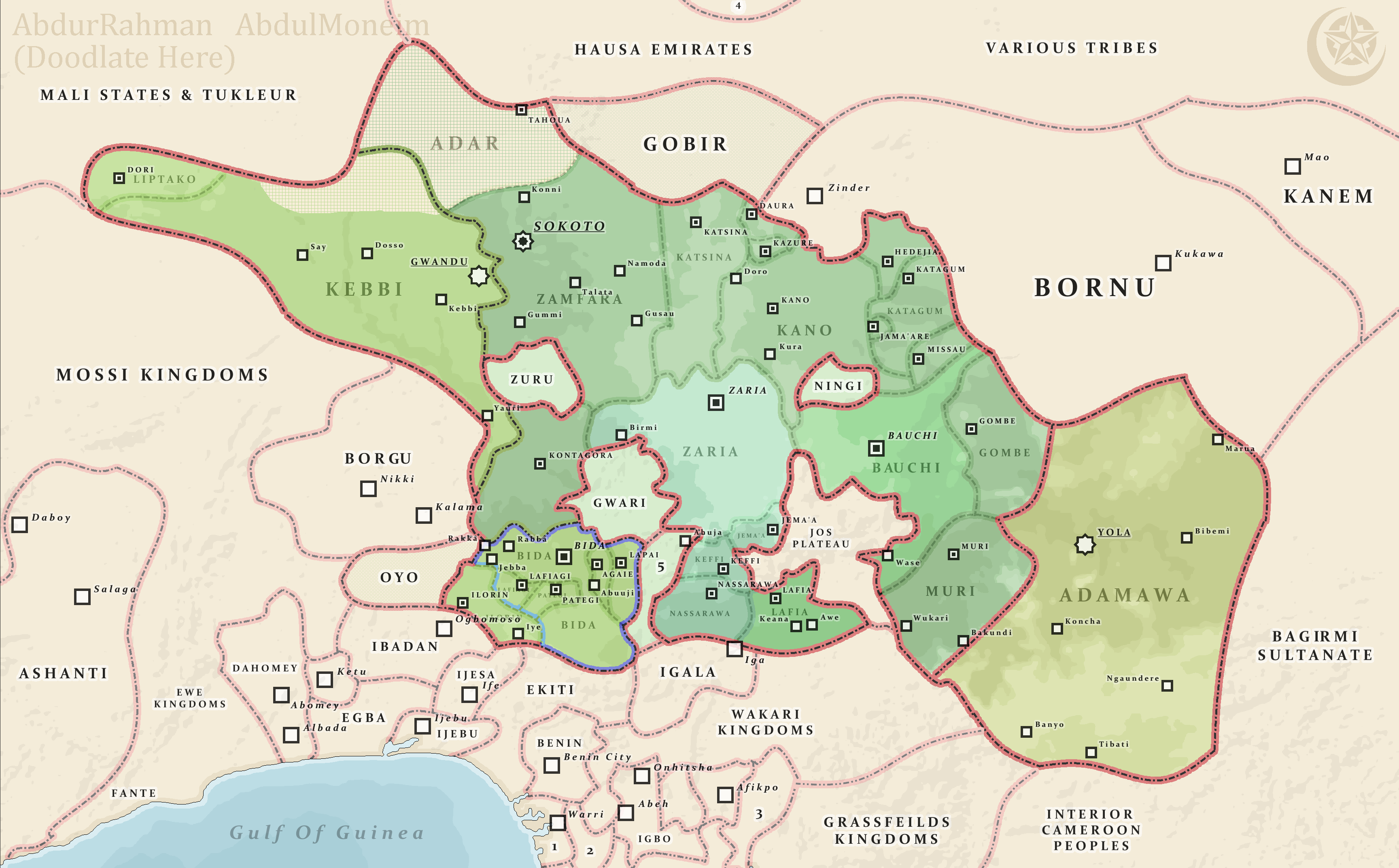
Sokoto Caliphate during the late 19th-century

According to tradition, upon learning that the Gobirawa had breached the walls of his capital, Mairoki had his wives strangle him with his own turban. Other sources claim he retired to Banga, where, stricken with remorse for the loss of his kingdom, he committed suicide. Another version asserts that he took his life after being surrendered to Bawa outside Kiawa. Bawa reportedly had him decapitated and his head hung from a fig tree, which is still called durumin Mairoki at Kiawa.

== Rulers of Zamfara ==
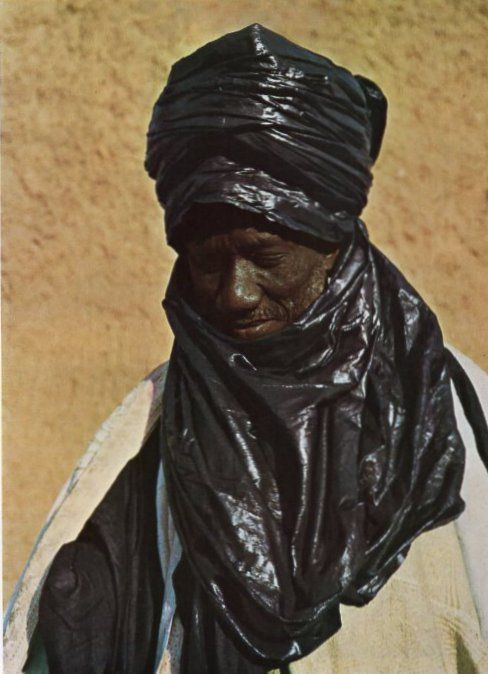
Ahmadu Barmo, Sarkin Zamfaran Anka, wearing bakan rawani (black turban/veil)

This is a list of the rulers of Zamfara since its founding, as recorded by historians S. J. Hogben and A. H. M. Kirk-Greene, who obtained it from Muhammadu Fari, Sarkin Zamfara of Anka (r. 1928–1946).

1. Dakka I
2. Jatau
3. Jimir Dakka
4. Kokai Kokai
5. Dudufani I
6. Algoje (only female ruler)
7. Bakurukuru (c. 1300)
8. Bakawa
9. Gimshikki
10. Karafau
11. Gatamma
12. Kudandam
13. Bardau
14. Gubarau
15. Tasgarin Burum
16. Durkusa
17. Mowashi
18. Kigaya
19. Tabarau
20. Dudufani II
21. Burum I (c. 1550)
22. Burum II (c. 1550; twin of Burum I)
23. Taritu
24. Fati I
25. Fati II (twin of Fati I)
26. Zartai (or Zaudai; c. 1625)
27. Dakka II
28. Tasau
29. Zaude
30. Aliyu
31. Hamidu Karima
32. Abdu na Makaki
33. Suleimana
34. Muhammadu na Makaki
35. Abdu na Tamane
36. Maliki (or Malu)
37. Babba I (c. 1715)
38. Yakubu I
39. Jimirra (or Jirau)
40. Falkari (or Fashane)
41. Babba II (c. 1734)
42. Yakubu II (from Birnin Lalle to Zamfara)
43. Maroki (c. 1756)
44. Abarshi (c. 1805; to Sabon Gari)
45. Fari (from Banga to Ruwan Gora)
46. Dan Bako (to Sabon Gari)
47. Dan Gado (to Anka)
48. Tukudu (c. 1825)
49. Abdu Fari
50. Abubakar (1829–1853)
51. Muhammadu Dan Gigala (1853–1877)
52. Hassan (1877–1896)
53. Muhammadu Farin Gani (1896–1899; nicknamed 'the Handsome')
54. Abdullahi Gado (1899–1904)
55. Abdu Caccabi (1904–1916)
56. Muhammadu Katar (1916–1928)
57. Muhammadu Fari (1928–1946)
58. Ahmadu Barmo (1946–1967)
59. Muhammad Lawali (1967–1993)
60. Muhammadu Attahiru Ahmad (1993–)
