= Battle of Gawakuke =

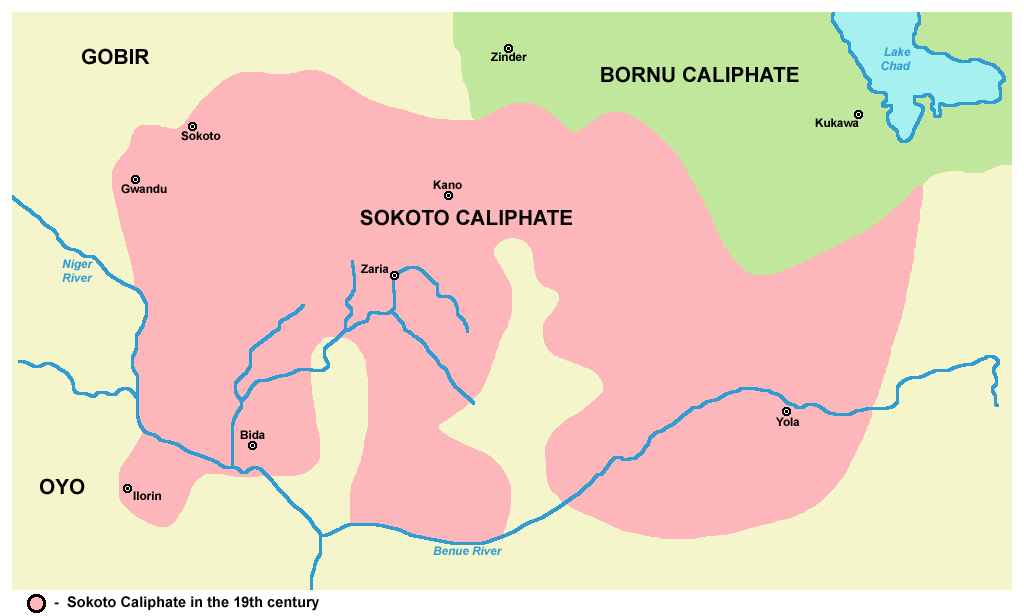
- Map of the Sokoto Caliphate in the 19th century with Gobir to the northwest.
Date	9 March 1836
Location	Gawakuke, Sokoto, Nigeria
Result	Sokoto victory

Belligerents
Sokoto Caliphate	Gobir city-state: Sultanate of Maradi

Commanders and leaders
Muhammed Bello: Ibrahim Dabo; Amenukal Muhammad al-Jailani; Various Tuareg chiefs including Kel Geres of Zodi, and Itesen of Wanagoda	Ali (Sarkin Gobir) †: Ineslemen Ibra (Tuareg Chief); Rauda (Sarkin Katsina-Maradi) †; Various non-Muslim Mbororo Fulani

Casualties and losses
Unknown	25,000 (estimated)

The Battle of Gawakuke was an engagement fought between the Sokoto Caliphate and the Gobir city-state at Gawakuke in northern Nigeria on 9 March 1836. The battle was a victory for Sokoto, and secured the Gobir kingdom's subordination to the caliphate.

In 1836, the Gobir kingdom revolted against the powerful Sokoto Caliphate, which had ruled Gobir since its initial conquest in 1808. To crush the rebellion, Sokoto Sultan Muhammed Bello and several of his allies marched to meet the rebels at Gawakuke, in northern Gobir territory. Bello's soldiers routed the assembled insurgent army and killed Gobir Sultan Ali, before embarking on a murderous campaign throughout the Gobir kingdom, burning villages and slaughtering peasants.

This battle was the last in a series of conflicts between Gobir and Sokoto that had lasted for nearly three decades. Muhammed Bello, the Sultan of Sokoto and commander of the army that defeated the rebels, died one year after the battle in 1837, at the age of 56.

== Origins ==
The founder of the Sokoto Caliphate, Usman dan Fodio, conquered Gobir in 1808 toward the end of the Fulani War, in which the renowned scholar led a successful jihad against the kingdoms of northern Nigeria. However, the Gobir populace despised Sokoto rule, frequently revolting and conducting an extensive guerrilla warfare campaign against Sokoto merchants, which severely compromised trade within the sultanate. In 1830 then Sokoto Sultan Muhammed Bello agreed to a truce with the Gobir Sultan Ali, splitting the territory in conflict between Sokoto and Gobir control.

Members of the Gobir aristocracy, however, were angered by the terms of the truce, and plotted to disrupt the peace. The collaborators sent a package to Gobir Sultan Ali, residing in Sokoto territory, containing a set of butcher's knives. As per tradition, this intended insult implied Ali was a slave of the Sokoto Caliphate, outraging the Gobir Sultan. Ali felt he had endured enough ridicule for his peace with the Sokoto and renounced his allegiance to the Caliphate before fleeing to Gobir in order to gather his forces. Ali persuaded other kingdoms in northern Sokoto territory to ally themselves with him, including the Tuareg and Maradi tribes, before leading an assault on the undefended town of Karatu and killing its inhabitants.

News of the revolt enraged Sultan Bello. He mobilized his allies and marched north-east in early March 1836 with a diverse force from several kingdoms under Sokoto control. He reached Gawakuke with his army on March 9, intending to demolish the rebels.

== Battle ==
The insurgent army was composed of camel-mounted cavalry, archers, and infantry spearmen under the leadership of Gobir Sultan Ali, Tuareg Chief Ibra, Maradi Chief Raudi, and Ali's brother, Baciri. Their assembled forces met Muhammed Bello's army on 9 March 1836; the armies faced one another in silence before commencing the pitched battle. After a fierce bout of fighting, the Tuareg contingent under Chief Ibra broke, and his troops were scattered. Muhammed Bello's forces pressed the attack and overpowered the remaining rebels, winning a decisive victory.

Two sources estimate the number of Gobir casualties to be somewhere between twenty and twenty-five thousand killed.

== Aftermath ==
Sultan Ali and Maradi Chief Raudi were slain in battle, but Tuareg Chief Ibra and Baciri managed to escape. After the victory, Muhammed Bello and his army rampaged throughout Gobir territory and slaughtered all males over the age of fifteen as punishment for the attack on Karatu.

The victory was the final battle in a long history of conflict between Gobir and Sokoto, and secured the kingdom's status as a protectorate of the Sokoto Caliphate. Muhammed Bello established a ribat, or fortified town, in the area to maintain the peace and prevent further uprisings.

== Sources ==
=== Books ===
- Boyd, Jean (13 September 2013). The Caliph's Sister. Routledge. ISBN 978-1135177942.
- Smalldone, Joseph P. (25 March 1977). Warfare in the Sokoto Caliphate (1st ed.). Cambridge University Press. ISBN 0521210690.
- Last, Murray (1967). The Sokoto Caliphate. Longmans. ISBN 0582646375.
- Ridgeon, Lloyd (15 December 2014). The Cambridge Companion to Sufism. Cambridge University Press. ISBN 978-1107018303.
- Stephen Johnson, Hugh Anthony (1966). A Selection of Hausa Stories. Clarendon Press. ISBN 0198151187.
- Adamu, Mahdi (1986). Pastoralists of the West African Savanna. Manchester University Press. ISBN 0719022487.
- Ade Ajayi, J. F. (1990). History of West Africa. Columbia University Press. ISBN 0231037376.

=== Websites ===
- Quintana, Maria L. (11 January 2010). "dan Fodio, Usman (1754-1817)". blackpast.org.
