= Tibiri =

- Commune and town
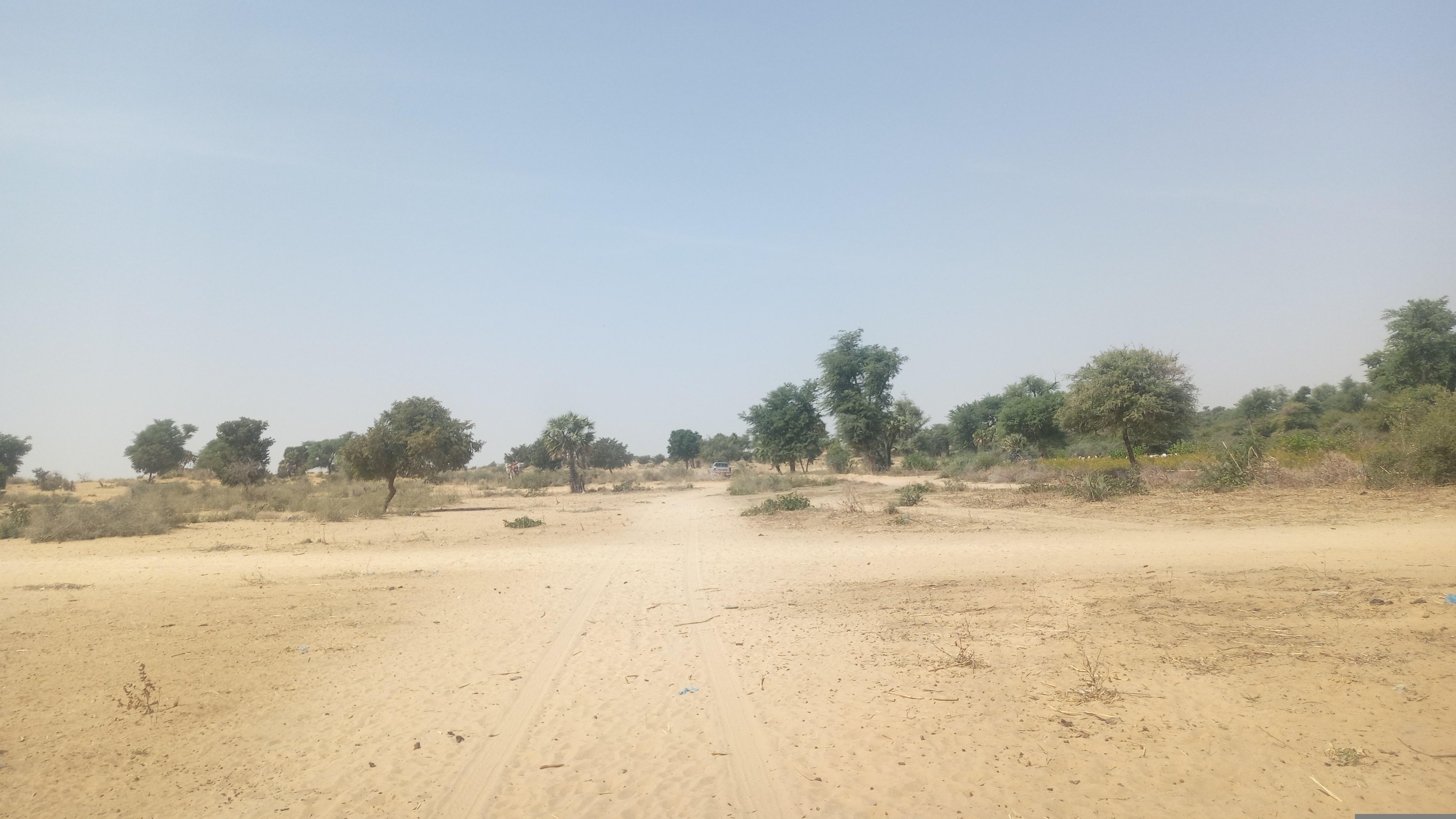
- Landscape

- Location in Niger
- Coordinates: 13°33′50″N 7°02′58″E
- Country: Niger
- Region: Maradi
- Department: Guidan Roumdji

Area
  - Commune and town: 347.5 sq mi (900.1 km^{2})
- Elevation: 1,150 ft (350 m)

Population (2012 census)
  - Commune and town: 125,806
  - Density: 362.0/sq mi (139.8/km^{2})
  - Urban: 25,513
- Time zone: UTC+1 (WAT)

Tibiri is a town and urban commune in Niger. As of 2012, it had a population of 125,806. It is the seat of the Sultan of Gobir.

== Geography ==
Tibiri is located in the greater Sudan region and borders the neighboring state of Nigeria to the southwest. The neighboring communities in Niger are Chadakori and Guidan Sori in the north, Maradi and Saé Saboua in the east and Safo and Sarkin Yamma in the south-east.

The municipality of Tibiri consists of an urban and a rural municipal area. The urban municipal area is divided into four neighbourhoods. These are called Bara, Goumar, Sarkin Fawa and Tibiri. The settlements in the rural municipal area consist of 136 villages, 3 hamlets and 31 camps.

== History ==
Tibiri was founded in 1836 under the ruler Mayaki as the new capital of the Gobir State, replacing its old capital Alkalawa, founded in the 18th century in present-day Nigeria. In 1899, the French Voulet-Chanoine mission reached the city. A few years later, Tibiri came under French rule. The office of the traditional ruler of Gobir continued to exist, even after Niger's independence, although it was increasingly limited to purely representative functions. As a result, Tibiri's political significance was lost during the colonial period, but the town's outstanding cultural importance for the Hausa remained.

Until 1972, only the major cities of Niamey, Maradi, Tahoua and Zinder had the status of an independent municipality in Niger. In that year, Tibiri was elevated to the status of a municipality at the same time as six other Nigerien towns.

== Culture ==
Every year, a large traditional religious ceremony of regional importance takes place at a seasonal lake twelve kilometres east of Tibiri. The sights in Tibiri include the chefferie traditionnelle, which is the seat of the sultan, and the palace of the ruler of Gobir.

== Economy ==
Tibiri's location in the Sudan region creates favourable conditions for agriculture by Nigerien standards. More than 90% of the population practises traditional agriculture. Millet and sorghum are grown for self-sufficiency. Peas, peanuts, sorrel and sesame, on the other hand, are mainly cultivated for commercial purposes. Livestock farming includes poultry, cattle, donkeys, horses, camels, sheep and goats. Of particular economic and cultural importance is a robust red-haired goat species (chèvre rousse de Maradi) bred mainly in Tibiri.
