= Battle of Tsuntua =

Battle in the Fulani War

Battle of Tsuntsua
- Part of the Jihad of Usman dan Fodio
| Date | December 1804 |
| Location | Tsuntsua, Gobir 13°38′38″N 6°17′23″E |
| Result | Gobir victory |

Belligerents
| Sokoto Caliphate; Kel Aïr Tuareg; Allied Hausas | Gobir; Tuareg: Kel Gress; Kel Itesen; Kel Tegama |

Commanders and leaders
| Sa'ad bin al-Hasan; Abdullahi dan Fodio (WIA); Muhammed Bello; Ali Jedo | Yunfa |

Strength
| Unknown | Unknown |

Casualties and losses
| 2,000+ dead | Unknown |
- Location within Nigeria

The Battle of Tsuntsua, fought in December 1804, was one of the largest battles in the jihad of Usman dan Fodio.

== Background ==
In 1804, Yunfa of Gobir realized the growing threat that his former teacher, Fulani Islamic reformer Usman dan Fodio, posed to the Hausa city-states. Appealing to the other Hausa rulers for help, Yunfa assembled an army to capture and kill Usman. Meanwhile, Usman's followers spread word of a jihad against the Hausa rulers, attracting a number of Fulani nomads to their cause, and declared Yunfa an infidel. In a dispute between them, Yunfa attempted to kill Usman, but his gun malfunctioned and only wounded his arm. Usman returned to the Fulani state of Gulu, where he raised a large army to crush the Hausa.

== The Battle ==
One of the first engagement of the war would be Tsuntua. Yunfa, possessing an army composed of Hausa warriors and Tuareg allies, defeated dan Fodio's forces, which lost more than 2,000 to 3,000 men, 200 of whom were said to have been Hafiz (people who know the Quran by heart). The Tuaregs of Kel Gress, Kel Itesen and Kel Tegama were from around Gobir. They used the valleys around the area for grazing during the winter season yearly. These Tuaregs allied with Yunfa as they did not think the Fulbe jihadists could win against Gobir and they wanted to continue using these valleys for winter grazing. The Tuaregs were instrumental in many of Gobir's victories especially in Tsuntua and Alwassa.

The Muslims were camped less than a day's journey from Alkalawa and were most likely dispersed looking for food. This provided a desirable opportunity for Yunfa's force to attack. The army attacked in Tsuntua leading to a loss for the Muslims. This battle was likely during Ramadan, so the Muslims might have been fasting. Key leaders of the jihad could not participate in this battle for various reasons. Bello was sick, Abdullah had an injured leg and Ali Jedo was not mentioned. The Muslim leader was a cousin of Bello, Sa'ad bin al-Hasan and among the dead were Imam Muhammad Sambo, Zaid bin Muhammad Sa'ad and Mahmud Gurdam.

However, the Gobir victory proved to be short-lived, as Uthman's forces seized Kebbi and Gwandu the following year, ensuring the survival and growth of their party.
