= Konni (Hausa state) =

Konni is a traditional Hausa state in what is today south central Maradi Region Niger and north Sokoto State Nigeria. It continues to exist as a ceremonial polity centered on the Nigerien city of Birni-N'Konni.

A small independent Hausa state in the medieval period, Konni was conquered by its larger neighbor Gobir around 1750. It remained, along with Gobir, a largely animist (locally called Arna) stronghold. It was overrun and sacked by forces of the Sokoto Caliphate at the beginning of the 19th century, but had reverted to suzerainty of Azna states in modern Niger when French colonial forces entered the area at the end of the century. Its capital Birni-N'Konni (Hausa for Citadel of Konni), was sacked by the French Voulet–Chanoine Mission in the 1898, and later assimilated into French West Africa. The traditional title of the ruler of Konni was retained by the French as an appointed "Canton chief", and continues as a ceremonial ruler.
