= Kwiambana =

Nigerian Forest Reserve and UNESCO Heritage Site

- Location within Nigeria
- Interactive map of Kwiambana
- 11°05′12″N 6°33′39″E
- Location: Maru, Zamfara State, Nigeria

History
- Demolished: early 19th-century

Site notes
- Governing body: National Commission for Museums and Monuments

Kwiambana is a ruined settlement in what is now the Kwiambana Forest Reserve. In November 1995 the Nigerian government submitted the site to UNESCO as a potential World Heritage Site.

The Kwiambana ruins were built on and around a granite inselberg with two peaks. They were protected by a ditch and a bank between five and seven meters high, topped by a rubble wall. In areas where the wall passes over bare rock, it is built of mud block with loopholes. Around the hillside there are some low free-stone walls. Within the enclosed area are several well-preserved mud structures, and several level sites where buildings may once have stood. The walls were constructed of natural coursed rubble, with alternating layers of stone and subsoil, and have resisted erosion. The settlement, which appears to be ancient, was destroyed during the Fulani Jihad in the early 19th century.
