= Jihad of Usman dan Fodio =

Military conflict in Nigeria and Cameroon (1804–1808)

- Part of the Fula jihads
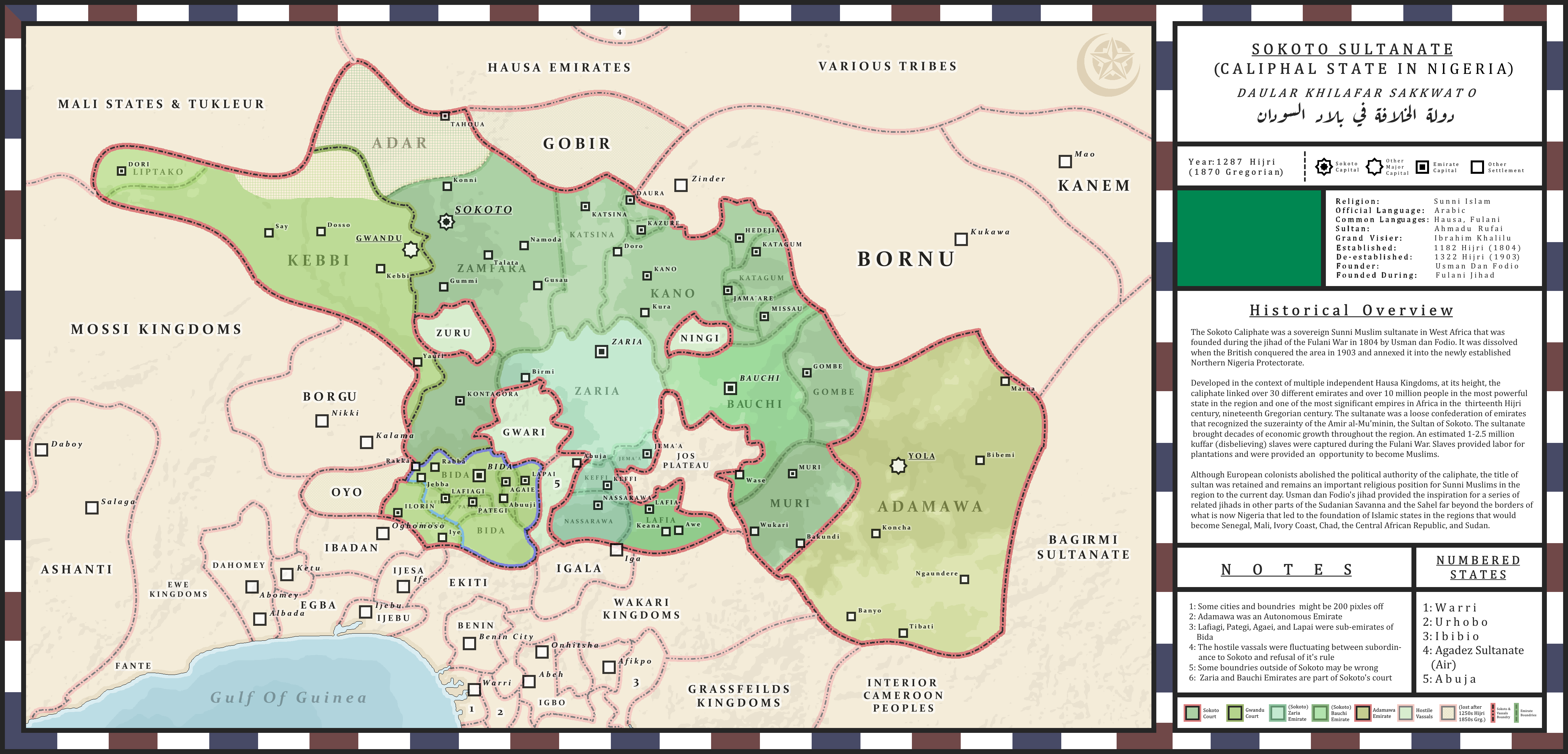
- The Sokoto Caliphate and its neighbours in 1870, established after the jihad led by Usman dan Fodiyo.
Date	February 21, 1804 – 1808
Location	Present day Nigeria and Cameroon
Result	Sokoto victory: Establishment of the Sokoto Caliphate

Belligerents
Sokoto Caliphate; Support: Sultanate of Aïr	Hausa Kingdoms: Gobir; Katsina; Kano; Biram; Daura; Zazzau; Kebbi; And others...; Kanem-Bornu; Oyo Empire; Support: Various Tuareg groups, including Kel Gres, Itesen and Kel Tegama

Commanders and leaders
Usman dan Fodio; Abdullahi dan Fodio; Muhammad Bello; Ali Jedo; Abd al-Salam; Sulaimanu; Umaru Dallaji; Modibo Adama; Buba Yero; Yaqubu dan Dadi; Muhammad Bukhari; Other mostly Fulani generals	Sarkin Gobir Yunfa †; Muhammad al-Kanemi; Dunama IX Lefiami; Magajin Halidu ‡‡; Muhammad Alwali II †; Musa II; 'Abdu dan Tsoho †; Muhammad Makau; Muhammad Hodi; Other kings and generals

The Jihad of Usman dan Fodio ; was a religio-military conflict in present-day Nigeria and Cameroon. The war began when Usman dan Fodio, a prominent Islamic scholar and teacher, was exiled from Gobir by King Yunfa, one of his former students.

Usman dan Fodio assembled an Islamic army to lead a jihad against Gobir and other Hausa Kingdoms of northern Nigeria. The forces of Usman dan Fodio slowly took over more and more of the Hausa kingdoms, capturing Gobir in 1808 and executing Yunfa. The war resulted in the creation of the Sokoto Caliphate, initially headed by Usman dan Fodio himself, which became one of the largest states in Africa in the 19th century. His success inspired similar jihads in Western Africa.

== Background ==
The ancient Kanem–Bornu Empire was losing power by the mid-18th century. There was large-scale immigration by Fulani pastoralists, leading to resource competition with more settled Hausa communities despite their shared religion. Several Hausa kingdoms previously tributary to Kanem-Bornu became independent and fought with each other. Rulers enforced harsh systems of conscription and taxation, while war caused social disruption, economic hardship, and enslavement of war captives. Fulani communities felt especially victimized by Hausa rulers' taxation and land control. Two prominent Hausa kingdoms that were central in the Jihad were Gobir, where Usman dan Fodio's parents settled in his childhood and where he lived until 1804, and Zamfara.

== Lead up to war ==
Usman dan Fodio, born in 1754, joined a growing number of traveling Islamic scholars through the Hausa kingdoms in the 1770s and became quite popular in the 1790s. Much of his preaching focused on the obligations of Muslim rulers to promote Islam and to rule ethically and generously in a manner that allowed their subjects to live as good Muslims while criticizing corruption, hypocrisy, oppression of fellow Muslims, and tolerance of beliefs and practices in conflict with Islam. Originally, dan Fodio's preaching received the support of the leadership of Gobir; however, as his influence increased and as he began to advocate for self-defense arming by his followers, his favor with the leadership decreased. King Nafata of Gobir, placed a series of restrictions on preaching by dan Fodio's followers and by Usman himself. In 1801, Sarkin Gobir Yunfa, a former pupil of dan Fodio, replaced Nafata as king and increased the restrictions on dan Fodio, exiling him from Gobir to the village of Degel. A crisis developed later in 1803 when Yunfa attacked and captured many of the followers of a group associated with dan Fodio. Yunfa then marched the prisoners through Degel, enraging many of dan Fodio's followers, who attacked the army and freed the prisoners.

Yunfa gave dan Fodio the option of exile before destroying Degel, but Usman refused to abandon his followers, instead leading a large-scale hijra of the community to Gudu. So many people went with dan Fodio throughout the state that on February 21, 1804, Yunfa declared war on dan Fodio and threatened punishment to anyone joining him. Followers of dan Fodio declared him to be the Amir al-Mu'minin "Commander of the Faithful" and renounced their allegiance to Gobir.

=== In Kanem-Bornu ===
The earliest recorded mention of the Fulani in Kanem-Bornu dates back to the arrival of a group of Fulani envoys from the Emperor of Mali at the court of the Mai (ruler) of Kanem during the reign of Kashim Biri (r. 1242–1262). A steady flow of Fulani pastoralists and Islamic scholars continued to settle in Hausaland and Kanem-Bornu. By the turn of the 19th-century, there were numerous Fulani groups living in Bornu. Before the jihad, most of these groups lived in relative peace with their Bornu neighbours. It was even customary for the Mais to go to war with other tribes to protect the Fulani from raids. However, perhaps due to the political ambitions of some of the Fulani, the Sayfawa princes developed a general hostility towards the Fulani in the 18th-century.

In the late 18th-century, the Galadima of Bornu, Dunama, administered a large district in western Bornu, which contained numerous Fulani groups and encompassed portions of what later became the emirates of Hadejia, Katagum, Jamaare, and Misau. Three figures led the jihad in this area: Bi Abdur, Lerlima, and Ibrahim Zaki. Bi Abdur lived near Hadejia and, around 1800, persuaded the Sarkin Hadejia (ruler of Hadejia) to appoint him as the leader of the local Fulani. He had considerable animosity towards the Galadima, who was responsible for his father's death. Lerlima, Bi Abdur's maternal cousin, was married to the Galadima's daughter and served in his administration, possibly as a tax collector. Ibrahim Zaki was a widely travelled mallam (Islamic teacher) and was familiar with the teachings of Shehu Usman.

To the south of the empire, a similar situation existed. The jihad was primarily led by Fulani groups centered at Deya (today in Gujba, Yobe State). During the late 18th-century, the local ruler of Deya, Muhammad Lafia, "because of his recalcitrant ways" was deposed by the Mai of Bornu, Ahmad. He was replaced with his younger brother, Muhammad Saurima, who the Mai hoped would be more cooperative. The local Fulani leadership, including two learned men, al-Bukhari and Goni Mukhtar, was displeased with Lafia's deposition as he had maintained friendly relations with the Fulani.

== Battles ==
Several minor skirmishes preceded the forces meeting at the Battle of Tsuntua. Although Yunfa was victorious and dan Fodio lost men, the battle did not diminish his force. He retaliated by capturing the village of Matankari, which resulted in the Battle of Tabkin Kwatto, a major action between Yunfa and dan Fodio's forces. Both the Gobirawa and Dan Fodio armies were ethnically mixed. The Gobirawa had some Tuaregs and Fulanis from the Sullubawa clan while the Muslims had Hausa, Fulani and a few Iwellemmedan Tuaregs. The Tuaregs of the Muslim army consisted of Agali and Adagh Muslims and possibly the sons of the Emir of Adagh. Although outnumbered, dan Fodio's troops were able to prevent Yunfa from advancing on Gunu and thus convince larger numbers of people to join his forces.

In 1805, the forces of dan Fodio, the jihadists, captured the Hausa kingdom of Kebbi. In 1807, the jihadists had taken over Katsina whose ruler, Magajin Halidu, committed suicide following the defeat. They then captured the Sultanate of Kano whose king (Muhammad Alwali II) was forced to flee to Zazzau, then the village of Burum-Burum where he was soon killed in battle. In 1808, the jihadists assaulted Gobir, killing Yunfa in the battle of Alkalawa, and destroying large parts of the city. Furthermore, Abdullahi dan Fodio also took over the Kebbi Emirate the same year.

With the capture of Gobir, the jihadists saw that they were part of a wider regional struggle. They continued with battles against several Hausa kingdoms, and the Sokoto Caliphate expanded over the next two years. The last major expansion of the jihadists was the toppling of the Sayfawa dynasty in 1846.

== Founding of the Sokoto Caliphate ==
Muhammed Bello, the son of Usman dan Fodio, transformed the semi-permanent camp of Sokoto into a city in 1809, during the Fulani war. Dan Fodio ruled from Sokoto as the religious leader of the Fulani jihad states from that point until 1815, when he retired from administrative duties. The Caliphate appointed various Emirs to govern the various states of the empire. These men were often veterans of the Fulani wars. Bello succeeded Usman dan Fodio as ruler of Sokoto and in 1817 adopted the title of sultan, an office that still exists, albeit stripped of most of its power by the British colonial government of Nigeria in 1903.

== Legacy ==
The success of the jihad inspired a number of later West African jihadists, including Massina Empire founder Seku Amadu, Toucouleur Empire founder Omar Saidou Tall, Wassoulou Empire founder Samori, Adamawa Emirate founder Modibo Adama and Zabarma Emirate founder Babatu (warlord).

The consequences of this Jihad reached far beyond West Africa, influencing regions as far as South America. Many recently enslaved individuals taken from these areas, who were already trained in military tactics, were highly able to stage numerous revolts in Portuguese Brazil that occurred during the 19th century.

The Sokoto Caliphate has continued to the present. Since the British conquest of the Caliphate in 1903, and later Nigerian independence under a constitutional government in 1960, the Caliphate's political authority has diminished. But the position still has considerable spiritual authority.

== See also ==
- Fula jihads
- History of Nigeria
