= Yunfa =

Hausa ruler

Yunfa dan Nafata
- Sultan of Gobir; Sarkin Gobir
- Reign: 1801–1808
- Predecessor: Nafata
- Successor: position abolished
- Died: 1808; Alkalawa

Muhammadu Yunfa (reigned 1801–1808) was a king of Gobir, a city-state in Hausaland in what is now Nigeria. He was the son of a Sultan of Gobir Nafata. He is particularly remembered for his conflict with Islamic reformer Shaikh Usman dan Fodio.

Usman was a teacher to Yunfa before his ascent to the throne of Gobir. Usman also had a large following in Gobir which was increasing rapidly. He had a large community of preachers and teachers. It is said the Usman helped Yunfa secure the throne as the number of candidates eligible for the throne were numerous. A year after Yunfa became Sultan, he attempted to kill the Shaikh in fear of his growing influence and proposed religious reforms. Yunfa invited the Shaikh to a meeting of which the Shaikh agreed to. Usman came with his brother, Abdullahi but that did not stop Yunfa from attempting his assassination plot. When they met face to face, he pulled out his pistol and tried to shoot at Usman. The pistol backfired and wounded him in the hand. This act by Yunfa sent a clear message to Usman that negotiating with him was off the table.

In late 1803, Yunfa seized some Muslim captives at Gimbana, but when the captives passed dan Fodio's hometown of Degel, the religious leader somehow managed to have them released. When his demands to have the captives returned were ignored, Yunfa threatened to destroy Degel. In response, dan Fodio and his followers fled to Gudu in February 1804.

Uthman soon called for help from other Fulani nomad groups, and after an election was held, he was declared Amir al-Mu'minin of a new caliphate. A widespread uprising soon began across Hausaland, and in 1804, Yunfa appealed to rulers of neighboring city-states for aid. In December of that year, Yunfa won a major victory in the Battle of Tsuntua, in which Dan Fodio's forces were said to have lost 2,000 men, 200 of whom knew the Koran by heart.

However, dan Fodio soon launched a successful campaign against Kebbi and established a permanent base at Gwandu. In October 1808, the jihadists seized the Gobir capital of Alkalawa and killed Yunfa.
