= Gobir =

Hausa kingdom

Kingdom of Gobir Masarautar Gobir (Hausa) مسرعة غوُبِرْ
- Status: State from 1150–1808; Currently various non-sovereign monarchies within Nigeria and Niger
- Capital: Asben (1150–1450); Birnin Lalle (1450–1600); Maigali; Goran Rami (1685–1756); Alkalawa (1756–1808)
- Common languages: Hausa; Tamazight; Fulfulde; Arabic
- Religion: Hausa animism, later replaced by Islam
- Demonym: singular: Bagobiri; plural: Gobirawa
- Government: Sarauta
- Sarki
  - 12th-century (at Asben): Ubandoro II (first)
  - 1801–1808: Yunfa (last)

Establishment
  - First capital established: 1150
  - Founding of Birnin Lalle: 15th century
  - Founding of Goran Rami: 18th century
  - Declaration of Uthman's jihad: 21 February 1804
  - Fall of Alkalawa: 3 October 1808
| Succeeded by |
| Sokoto Caliphate |
- Today part of: Niger; Nigeria

The Kingdom of Gobir (Demonym: Gobirawa) was a Hausa kingdom in what is now northern Nigeria. Founded by the Hausa in the 12th century, Gobir was one of the seven original kingdoms of Hausaland, and continued under Hausa rule for nearly 700 years. Its capital was the city of Alkalawa. In the early 19th century elements of the ruling dynasty fled north to what is today Niger from which a rival dynasty developed ruling as Sarkin Gobir ("King of Gobir") at Tibiri. In 1975 a reunited traditional sultanate took up residence in Sabon Birni, Nigeria.

== History ==
=== Origin ===
While broader Hausa tradition claims the founder of Gobir to have been Duma, a grandson of Bayajidda, this is overshadowed by the tradition found in records preserved by the Gobir ruling house (Bacirawa) where they trace their descent from the nomadic Copts (or Kibdawa) of Arabia. The Gobirawa are said to have migrated from Kabila, north of Mecca, to Gubur in Yemen, where they established their first king (Sarkin Gobir), Bana Turmi. From there, they passed through Khartoum and Bornu to Asben, Surukul, Birnin Lalle, Magali, and finally Goran Rami. Gobir's regnal list has 372 kings said to span over 7000 years, and details years and months.

Historians S. J. Hogben and A. H. M. Kirk-Greene noted that this claim is disputed by some and might have been an invention of Bawa Jan Gwarzo (r. 1777–1795) to avoid paying tribute (murgu) to Bornu. British historian Murray Last observes that Egyptian merchants before the 15th century seem to have given the Asben region the Coptic name 'Gubir'. He also points out that the Coptic word for henna is kouper, and it may not be a coincidence that the one time Gobir capital is named Birnin Lalle ('city of henna').

A manuscript in the possession of the alkali (chief judge) of Sabon Birni sheds more light on the Coptic tradition. According to this manuscript, Muhammad, the Islamic prophet, called on Bana Turmi to support him against his enemy Haibura. Wanting to be on the winning side, Bana Turmi sent half of his retainers to support Muhammad and the other half to Haibura. Haibura lost the battle and was slain at Badr.

Accordingly, after the battle, Muhammad saw a group of Gobirawa fleeing and ordered them to be captured. When they were brought before him, he asked why they had fled, as victory was theirs. They revealed that they had been fighting for Haibura, exposing Bana Turmi's duplicity. Muhammad then declared that the Gobirawa would suffer from divided counsel and internal dissension until the end of time.

Tradition continues that Bana Turmi then led the Gobirawa out of Yemen and died at the salt wells of Bilma. His grandson, Bala, then led the Gobirawa further west into the land of Asben, where they aligned with the Idirfunawa of the Adrar against the Tuaregs.

According to historian Boubé Gado, some claim that Bana Turmi, whose actual name is Bawo na Turmi, was the son of Bawo and the grandson of Bayajidda. This connects the Gobir tradition with the more well known Bayajidda legend of Daura.

=== Early history (12th century to 17th century) ===
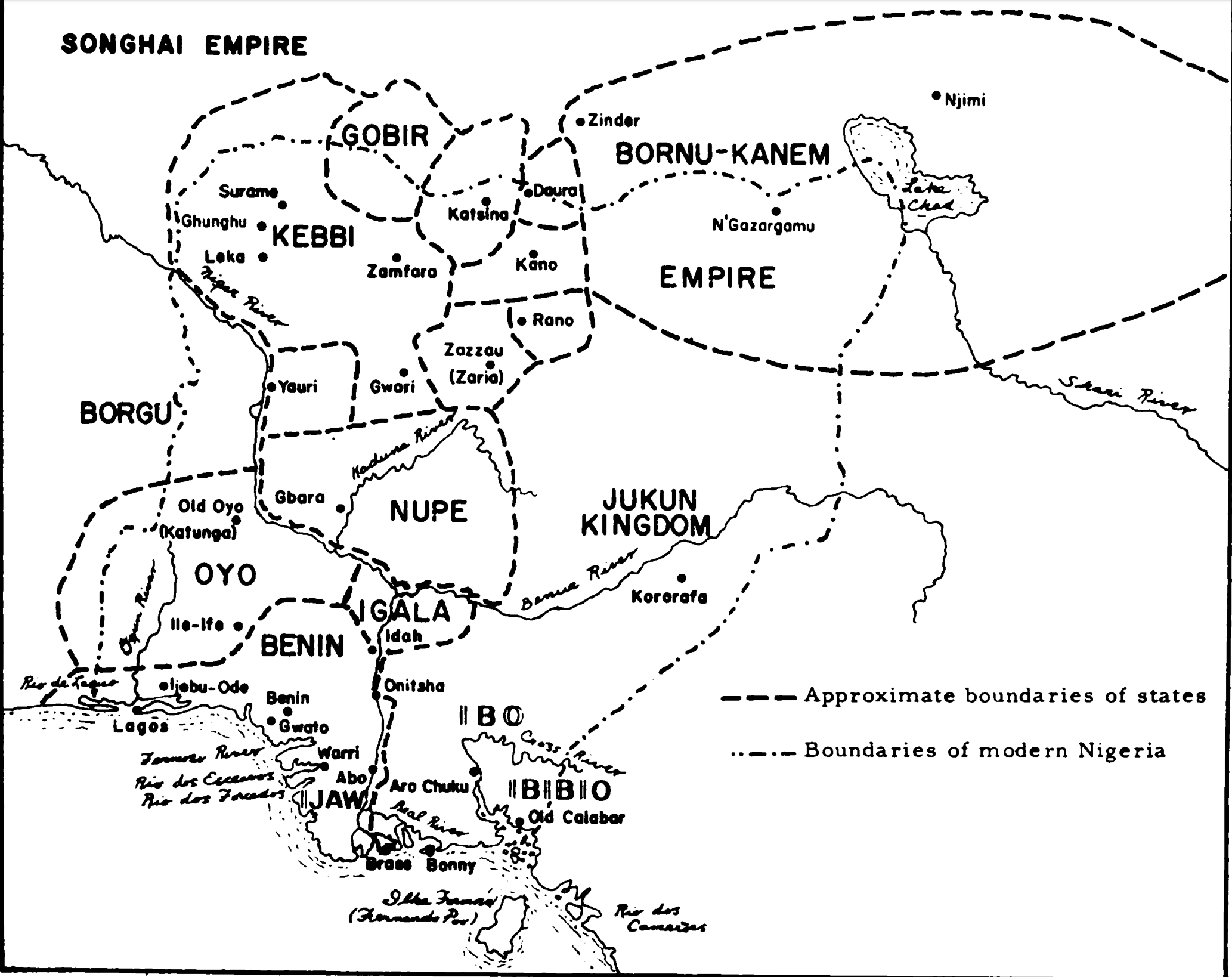
Gobir in the 16th century

Gobir was one of the seven original kingdoms of Hausaland, tracing a lineage back to the 11th century. It was the northernmost of the Hausa states and was depended on to protect its sister states from northern adversaries, particularly the Tuareg tribes. From its founding, Gobir had a proud martial reputation, likely stemming from its long history of nomadism.

Although the majority of the Gobirawa ('people of Gobir') were Hausa, the ruling dynasty claimed Coptic descent, marking under their eyes with "the same mark found under the eye of the Pharaohs on the monuments," called takin kaza ('the fowl's footprint') in Hausa. This ruling house descended from Bana Turmi, the first Sarkin Gobir, who died at Bilma. They arrived in the Asben region between the 12th and 14th centuries, establishing a state with the Idirfunawa (Hausawa in Adrar) they met there. Historian Mahdi Amadu in the General History of Africa (1984) says that the kingdom was possibly centred on Marandet, a prosperous city from the 9th century, which may indicate the Gobirawa had a centralised state at that time.

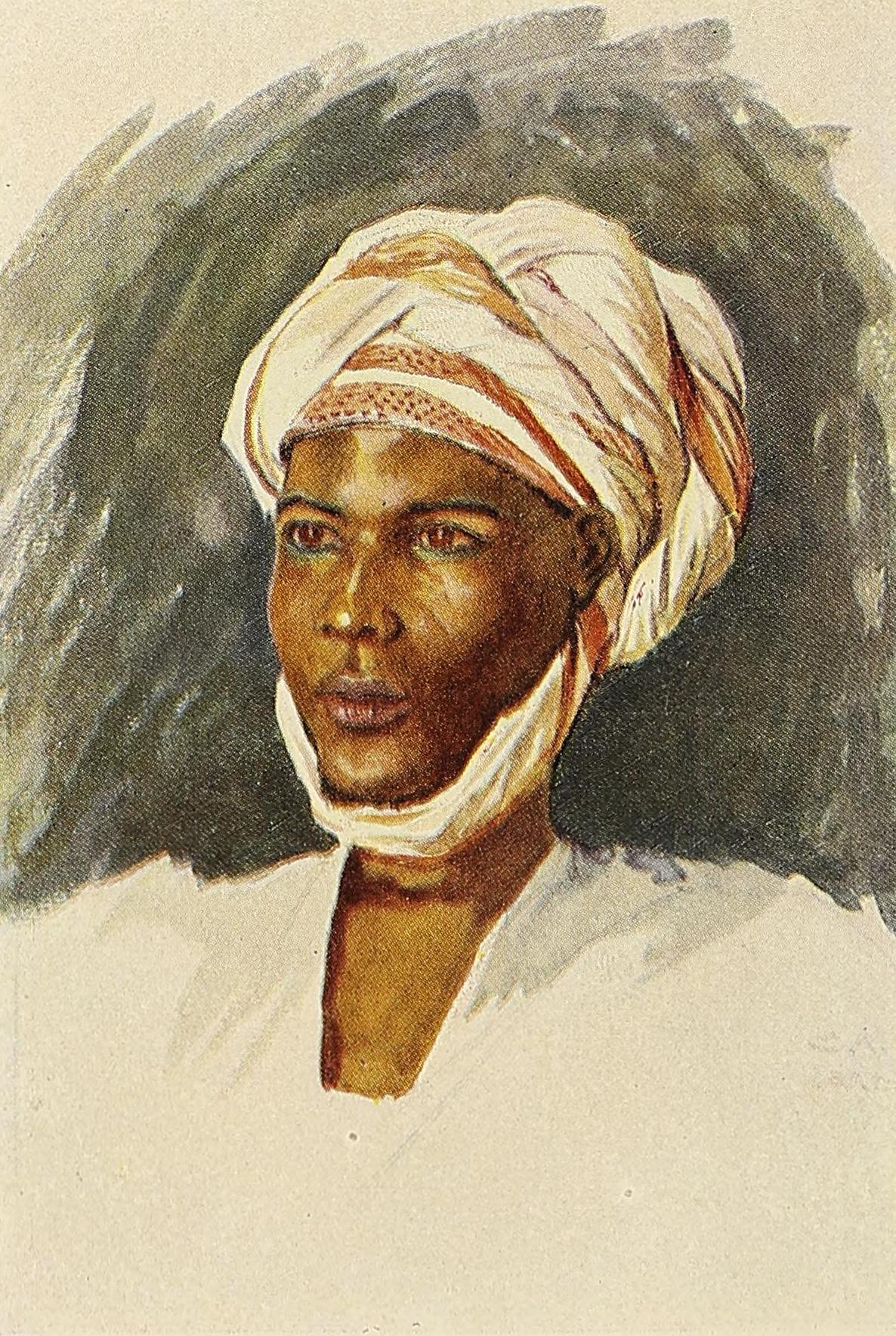
An early 20th century depiction of a man from Gobir by Carl Arriens

By the 15th century, Gobir had "many villages inhabited by shepherds and other herdsmen", according to Leo Africanus. It utilised its large number of artisans and linen weavers to produce and export textiles and shoes, "made like those of the ancient Romans", as far as Timbuktu and Gao through Wangara traders. However, due to constant pressure from the Tuaregs since the 12th century, its economy suffered, and the Gobirawa were forced to move southwards. The Tuaregs had established the Sultanate of Agadez/Ayr early in the 15th century, replacing Gobir as the dominant power in the Aïr mountains. The document Kitab Asi Sultanati Ahyar I ("Chronicle of the Sultanate of Ayr I") mentions the Gobirawa as having migrated out of Agadez (Ayr). Some of the population of Asben split to settle in Adar, becoming the Adarawa. The Kano Chronicle says the 'Abzinawa' arrived at Gobir in the mid-15th century, and were associated with increased availability of salt. After fleeing Asben, the Gobirawa first moved to Maigali and later to Goran Rami, near present-day Sabon Birni. In the early 18th century, they moved their capital to Birnin Lalle. According to the 19th-century German geographer Heinrich Barth, after their conquest the Gobirawa agreed with the Tuaregs that they would not be exterminated and that Tuareg kings should always marry a black woman.

=== 18th century ===
==== Soba's reign ====
Around 1715, together with Agadez, Gobir aided Zamfara in its successful revolt against Kebbi, which at the time was the dominant power in western Hausaland. This alliance strengthened the relationship between the Gobirawa and the Zamfarawa. The Gobirawa continued to move peacefully into the fertile Zamfara region, a process that began early in the 18th century. The rulers of Zamfara initially welcomed them as useful warriors and granted them farms. However, the relationship soon deteriorated after Sarkin Gobir Soba besieged Zabarma for three years, plundering on a large scale.

Afterward, Soba led his forces across the Niger River to ravage Gurma. They continued the campaign as far south as Ilorin in Yorubaland. Some of the Gobirawa remained in Ilorin, eventually settling there permanently. The Gobirawa community continued to thrive in Ilorin, leading to a close relationship between the Yoruba and the Gobirawa. Today, they are represented in the Ilorin Emirate Council by the Sarkin Gobir of Ilorin.

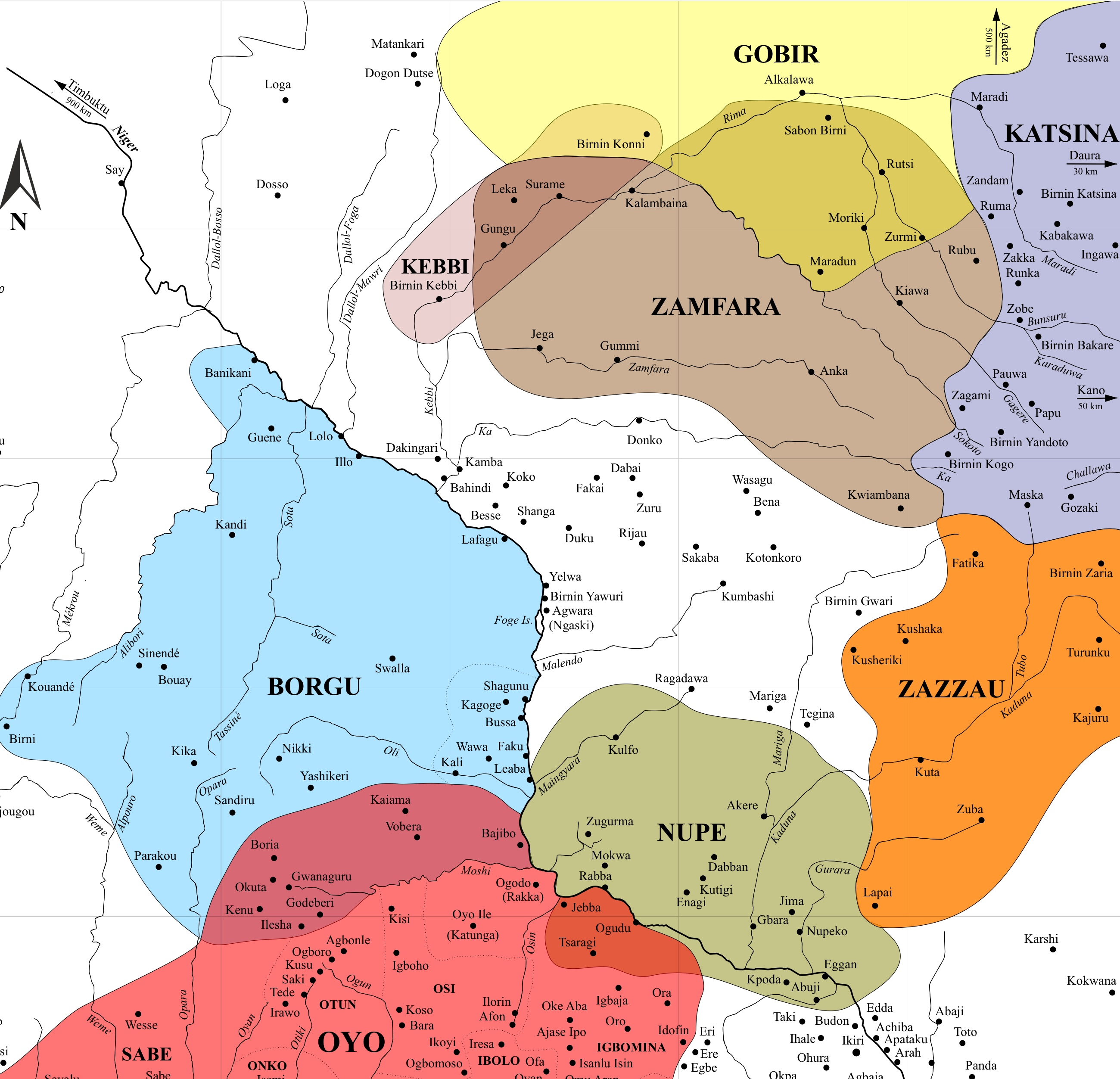
Map of western Hausaland in the late 18th century

Soba resumed his wars in the mid-18th century, attacking a former ally, Katsina. While the Gobirawa were engaged in a seven-year siege against the Katsina city of Maradi, Agadez descended upon Goran Rami, the capital of Gobir. The Zamfarawa immediately came to Gobir's aid, secretly surrounding the Agadez forces at night with a fence of thorns before launching an attack.

Upon his return after the failed siege of Maradi, Soba immediately set out for revenge, sacking the Agadez cities of Manni and Adrar. However, his army eventually grew tired of the incessant campaigning and deserted him. Consequently, he was killed by Agadez forces. His son, Gofe, and his daughter, the Magajiya, both fell while fighting beside their father.

==== Babari's reign (1742–1770) ====
Soba's successor, Uban Iche (or Ibn Ashe), was murdered by his son, Babari. Babari took the title of sarki and immediately led raids into Katsina, Kano, and Shirra in Katagum. After reigning as Sarkin Gobir for 15 years, he began a series of attacks on Zamfara, despite his sister Fara's marriage to Sarkin Zamfara Maroki. The Zamfarawa fiercely defended against these attacks. However, they eventually abandoned their sarki due to his constant taunting whenever they failed to finish off the Gobirawa. Consequently, the Gobirawa ravaged Birnin Zamfara, the capital of Zamfara, with little resistance. Maroki fled to Kiawa, an ancient hill fortress inhabited by Katsinawa, located about twenty miles east of Kaura Namoda.

According to Barth, a 'reliable source' informed him that the destruction of Birnin Zamfara happened around 1756, ninety-seven years before his arrival in Hausaland in 1853. Other sources claim that the capital was destroyed in 1762.

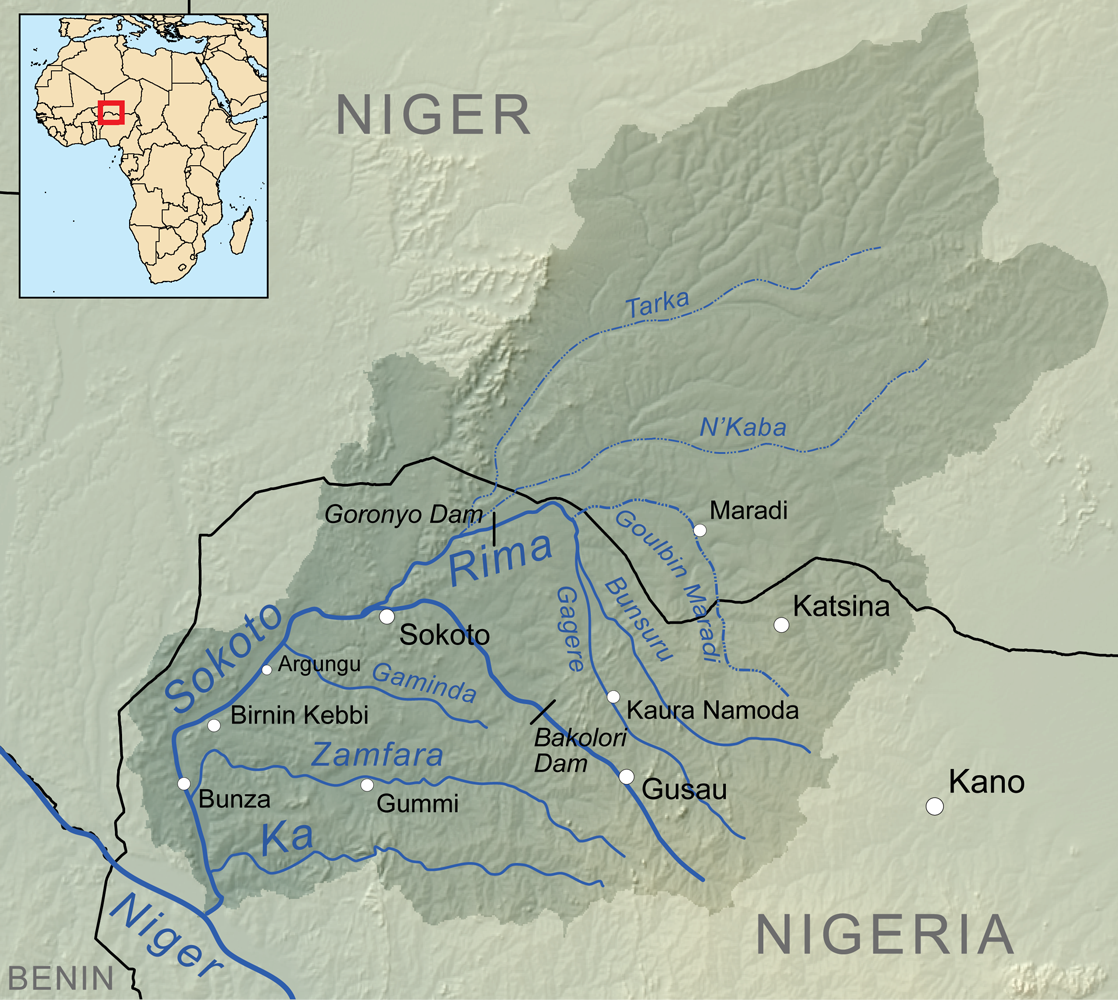
Sokoto-Rima river basin

Babari then established a new capital on the banks of the Gulbin Rima River. He called this new walled town Alkalawa because it was built on the official farmlands (gandu) of the Chief Alkali of Zamfara. These farms were originally given to Gobirawa immigrants by Sarkin Zamfara Malu (or Maliki), the father of Sarkin Zamfara Babba (c. 1715).

=== Fall (19th century) ===
Gobir is particularly remembered as the chief opponent of Fulani Islamic reformer Usman dan Fodio. Bawa, a ruler of Gobir, appears to have invited dan Fodio to the area in 1774; dan Fodio made his home in the small town of Degel, and began preaching. Dan Fodio was given some role in the education of Bawa's nephew and later successor, Yunfa (r. 1803–8), but also publicly attacked what he saw as the abuses of the Hausa elite, particularly the burden they placed on the poor. Sarki Nafata (r. 1797–98) reversed Bawa's tolerant policy, and feared the increase of arms amongst dan Fodio's followers. The next two rulers vacillated between repressive and liberal measures. When Yunfa took the throne in 1803, he soon found himself in conflict with dan Fodio, and after failing to assassinate him, exiled dan Fodio and his followers from Degel. Dan Fodio responded by assembling the nomadic Fulani clans into a jihadist army, beginning the Fulani War and eventually establishing the Sokoto Caliphate. Despite some initial successes by the forces of Gobir and the other Hausaland states (most notably at the Battle of Tsuntua), dan Fodio managed to conquer the surrounding territory. His forces seized the Gobir capital, Alkalawa, in October 1808, killing Sarki Yunfa. The state was then partially absorbed into Sokoto.

=== Modern history ===
Resistance against the Jihadists was continued in the north-east by Sarki Ali dan Yakubu and Sarki Mayaki. With the help of the Hausa ruler of Katsina the latter built a new capital of Gobir in Tibiri, 10 km north of Maradi in 1836. When the Gobir Sultan revolted against the Sokoto Caliphate that same year, Sokoto Sultan Muhammed Bello crushed the rebellion at the Battle of Gawakuke. The Gobirawa dispersed to Birnin Kadaye, Gawon Bazau, and Tibiri.

In 1853 some Gobirawa led by Yariman Gobir Dan Halima founded the settlement of Sabon Birnin Dan Halima near Bunsuru River. In 1939/40 (during Umaru Shawai's reign) they moved to Sabon Birni after the town was destroyed in a flood. Animism remained important, and the position of Inna (female priest) was the second most prestigious after Sarkin Gobir. In the late 20th century a local government chairman, an adherent of the anti-bid'ah Izala Society, demanded the position of Inna go to him and his relatives as they were descendants of a previous Inna, after which the official house of the Inna was destroyed. The Sarkin Gobirs did not appoint another one, and the last Inna died in 2003.

In the present day there are three Sarkin Gobirs in Sokoto State (seated in Sabon Birni, Isa, and Gatawa), ones in Kebbi, Katsina, and Kwara states, and another seated in Tibiri, Niger. In 2024 Sarkin Gobir na Gatawa Isah Muhammad Bawa was abducted along with 5/6 others by bandits for ransom and was later murdered; his son was captured too but was freed after a ₦60 million ransom (approximately US$40,000) was paid.

Sarkin Gobir is also a title given in the Ilorin Emirate where there is a Gobirawa minority. The current Sarkin Gobir of Ilorin is Yakubu, having ascended to the position in 2025.

== Administrative structure ==
Like most of the states of Hausaland, Gobir practiced the sarauta (kingship) system. The head of state was the sarki, appointed by an electoral college known as the Taran Gobir ("Gobir nine"). The grand electors had to reach a unanimous decision on a successor, and this electoral college also served as the sarki's council. The sarki exercised authority through three groups of officials: members of the ruling dynasty, public servants, and governors of towns and regions. The highest-ranking titleholder in Gobir, apart from the sarki, was the ubandawaki ('commander of the cavalry'), who was responsible for overseeing the army.

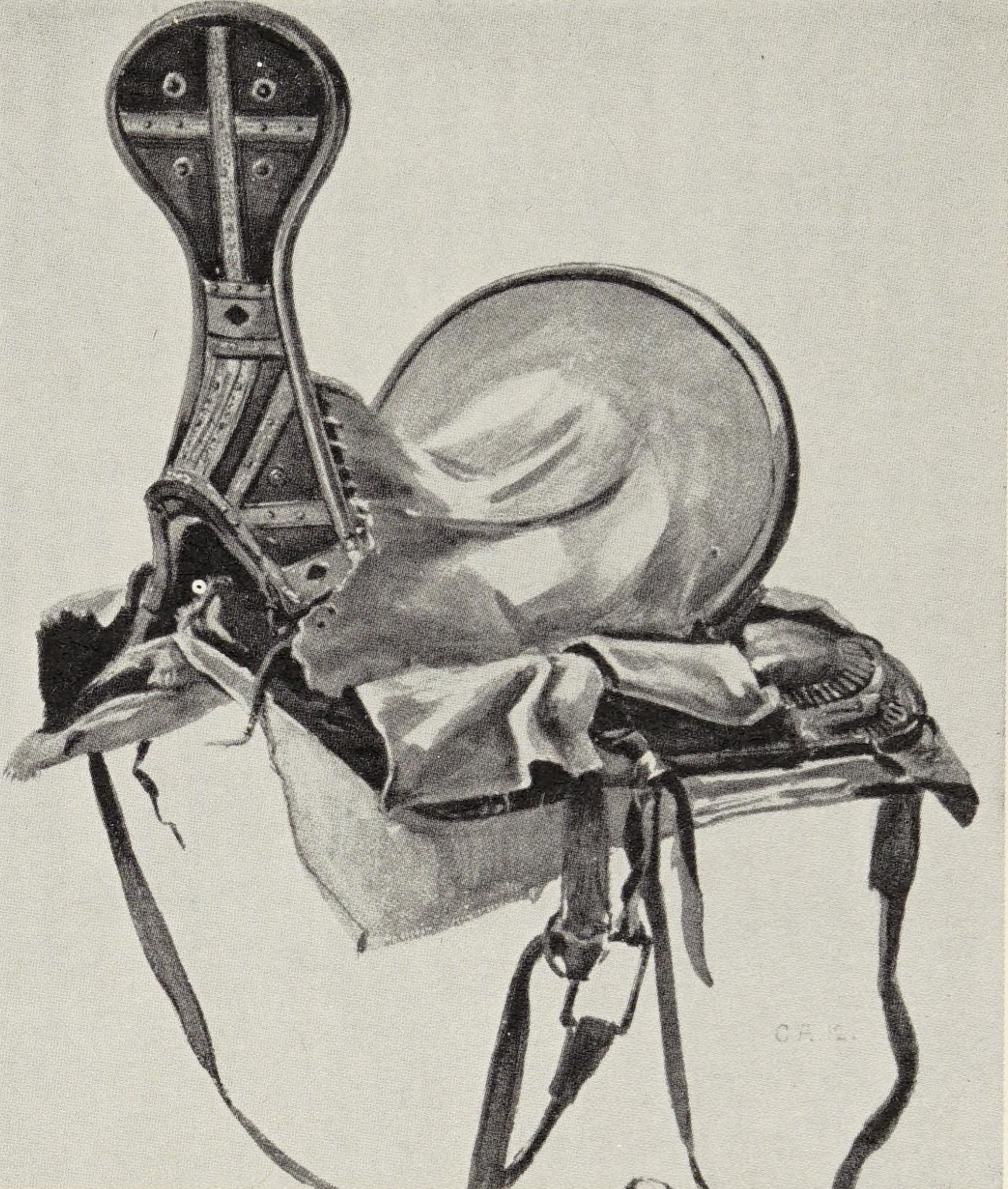
A saddle made by Gobir artisans

The officials of the central government consisted of:

1. Court dignitaries who managed palace and city affairs, acting as intermediaries between the sarki and regional governments.
2. Guild representatives appointed from skilled craftspeople, such as blacksmiths, weavers, dyers, tanners, masons, butchers, and hunters. They managed relations with various trades and occupations, particularly in collecting state dues.
3. Representatives of indigenous groups within the state.
4. Representatives of immigrant groups, each with designated officials. For example, the Sarkin Azbin managed relations with the Tuaregs living in Gobir, while the Sarkin Fulani did the same for the Fulbe.
5. The mallamai (Islamic scholars).

Today at Tibiri in Niger, a 'rump state' of Gobir still exists, ruled by the pre-jihad aristocracy of Gobir. The head or priest-chief of the animists, known as the Sarkin Anna, is considered the 'brother' and, in some sense, the 'equal' of the Sarkin Gobir. According to local tradition, the Sarkin Anna held a similar position in the original Gobir polity. The Sarkin Anna is also the custodian of the royal regalia of Gobir, which includes a sabre, two bracelets (one gold and one silver), a bow, and a quiver.

Another powerful titleholder in Gobir was the Inna, an office typically given to the sarki's sister. She served as the high priestess of the Bori cult, representing the Takurabow or Inna Baka ('the Black Inna'), the dynastic goddess of Gobir.

== Rulers of Gobir ==
This sections lists the holders of the title of Sarkin Gobir ("King of Gobir"). The list is derived from the Sokoto Provincial Gazetteer compiled by P G Harris, a British colonial administrator. Other lists exist, including one by E J Arnett (another colonial official), which was based on a list found at Yankaba (located in Nassarawa, Kano). Although there are discrepancies, especially in the earlier names, all known lists agree on Bana Turmi as the first king.

=== Gubur in Arabia and later at Suakin ===
1. Bana Turmi
2. Gubur
3. Sanakafo
4. Majigi
5. Sarki
6. Bartuwatuwa
7. Bartadawa
8. Bartakiskia
9. Kartaki
10. Sagimma
11. Baran Kwammi
12. Masawana Jimri Gaba

=== Khartoum ===
13. Ciroma
14. Dan Goma
15. Sakidamma
16. Matsaura
17. Duguma
18. Zaberma
19. Umi
20. Gozo
21. Banizam
22. Beyamusi
23. Gosi
24. Jimri Gaba
25. Ciroma II
26. Majejeri
27. Kasimu
28. Cida

=== Bornu ===
29. Gojo
30. Dara
31. Jelani
32. Bataji
33. Babba
34. Munzakka
35. Munzakka II
36. Munzakka III
37. Alazi
38. Kana Ju'un
39. Baciri
40. Hunda
41. Dalla Gungumi
42. Dalla Kure
43. Hammadmi
44. Humadi
45. Arkal
46. Babba
47. Humdu
48. Ubandoma
49. Baciri II
50. Ubandoma (possibly Ubandoro)
51. Ubandoma II
52. Baciri III

=== Asben ===
53. Ubandoro II
54. Abdulla
55. Keji
56. Dunsumi
57. Akwai Allah
58. Zamai
59. Falali
60. Gintsarana
61. Dalla
62. Baciri IV
63. Muhammadu
64. Dara
65. Ciroma III
66. Mundagas
67. Baran Kwammi
68. Ashafa
69. Baciri V
70. Bustadana Gingama
71. Ashafa Dara
72. Kawami
73. Mundagas II
74. Ciroma IV
75. Muhamman
76. Kazgaba
77. Muhammadu
78. Maji
79. Ciroma V
80. Arkal II
81. Usmanu
82. Ushuwa
83. Makuwa
84. Muhammadu Dan Ciroma (c. 1715)
85. Baciri VI
86. Muhamman Mai Gici
87. Akali
88. Arkal III
89. Muhammadu
90. Soba
91. Uban Iche (Ibn Ashe)

=== Alkalawa ===
| Nº | Name | Reign | |
|---|---|---|---|
| 92 | Babari | 1742 | 1770 |
| 93 | Dan Gudi | 1770 | 1777 |
| 94 | Gambai | 1777 | |
| 95 | Bawa Jan Gwarzo | 1777 | 1795 |
| 96 | Yakuba | 1795 | 1801 |
| 97 | Nafata | 1801 | 1803 |
| 98 | Yunfa | 1803 | 1808 |

==== Family tree of the rulers of Gobir at Alkalawa ====
Ibn Ashe
Babari; 1742– 1770
Dan Gudi; 1770–1777 | Bawa Jan Gwarzo; 1777–1795 | Yakuba; 1795–1801 | Nafata; 1801–1803
Yunfa; 1803–1808
