= Kaura Namoda =

- LGA and town
- Interactive map of Kaura Namoda
- Location in Nigeria
- Coordinates: 12°36′0″N 6°35′23″E
- Country: Nigeria
- State: Zamfara State
- Named for: Muhammadu Namoda

Government
  - Emir: Alhaji Sanusi Muhammad Asha
  - Local Government Chairman: Mannir Muazu Haidara

Area
  - Total: 868 km^{2} (335 sq mi)

Population (2006 census)
  - Total: 281,367
  - Density: 324/km^{2} (840/sq mi)
- Time zone: UTC+1 (WAT)
- 3-digit postal code prefix: 882
- ISO 3166 code: NG.ZA.KN

Kaura Namoda, is a town and Local Government Area in Zamfara State, Nigeria. It is home to the Federal Polytechnic, Kaura-Namoda. It has an area of 868 km^{2} and a population of over 281,367 at the 2006 census.

== History ==
Kaura Namoda was founded in 1807 by Muhammadu Namoda, who was a prince of Alibawa ruling family of Zurmi and a 19th century military genius.

Namoda fought alongside the Sokoto jihadists and was appointed Sarkin Zamfara. However, Zamfara never became an emirate. The town was an important regional center in the early 20th century, largely due to its location as the terminus of the railway.

== Postal code ==
The postal code of the area is 882.

== Climate ==
The district has an annual temperature of 30.31 °C (86.56 °F), 82.13 rainy days, and 61.59 millimetres or 2.4 inches of precipitation.

== Transport ==
It is served by a station at the terminus of a branch line of the western line of the national railway network. In 2014, this line is proposed to be rehabilitated and extended to Niamey in Niger.

== See also ==
- Railway stations in Nigeria

== Districts and villages ==
- Banga
- Dan Isa
- Gabake
- Kagara
- Galadima
- Yankaba
- Sakajikiworld
- Marafa
- Madaro
- Kungunki
- Kyam
- Kurya
- Barawa
- Baura
- Emir
- Hakimi Dan Hassan
- Kofar Kwatar Kwashi
- Shiyar Dan Galadima
- Shiyar Limanchi
- Shiyar Mai Jubbu
- Shiyar Sarkin Baura
- Shiyar Wali
- Tsohuwar Kasuwa
