= Sarauta =

Hausa political system

Sarauta is a Hausa political system that originated in the ancient city-state of Daura (in present-day Katsina State). According to Hausa oral traditions, the sarauta system emerged around the year 1000 and gradually spread across Hausaland, evolving into a complex network of institutions and values that came to dominate the Hausa states by the 15th-century. The title of sarki, according to some oral traditions, originates from Bayajidda, the mythical hero-founder of the Hausa states. Bayajidda took the title of Makassarki (Killer of Sarki) after slaying Sarki, the snake that had terrorised the people of Daura. In time, Makassarki was shortened to Sarki, the Hausa word for chief or ruler.

The system is characterised by a hierarchical structure, with the sarki (king or chief) at the top. The sarki's power is influenced by factors such as their individual character, political influence of aristocratic titleholders, domestic and external allies, and general social, economic, and political conditions. Although the office of sarki is hereditary, there is also an "electoral college" of eligible male descendants of ruling dynasties who can contest to become the sarki. Other important institutions of sarauta include a governing council composed of senior aristocrats with various titles and junior aristocrats often affiliated to senior aristocrats in patron-client relationships. There are also low-level palace personnel, including court jesters, royal musicians, messengers, enforcement agents, courtiers, heads of occupational groups, and Muslim clerics.

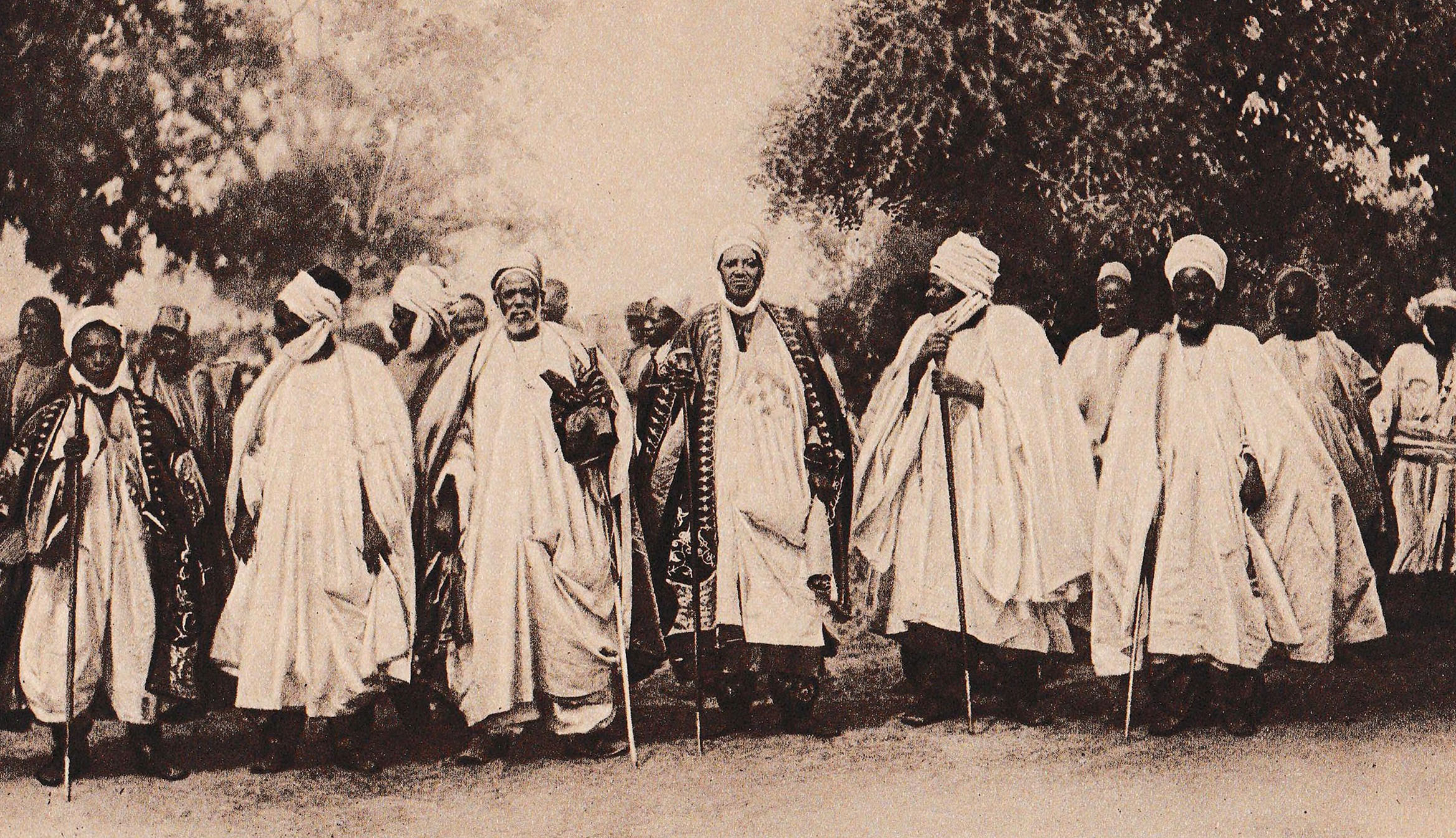
Some emirs of Northern Nigeria, including the Shehu of Bornu, Abubakar Garbai (third from left), and the Emir of Kano, Muhammad Abbas (third from right). Taken during the great durbar of 1913 in Kano.

The Sokoto Caliphate, which ruled much of Hausaland throughout the 19th-century, significantly influenced sarauta political institutions. The leaders of the Sokoto jihad sought to reform sarauta by aligning it more closely with Islamic principles of governance. They criticised practices such as hereditary succession, taxation systems, and the perceived neglect of religious precepts, advocating instead for a governance model rooted in Islamic ideals. Despite these efforts, many pre-existing political traditions and structures persisted, as the jihad did not entirely dismantle the sarauta system.

The British adopted sarauta-emirates as the foundation of indirect rule in Northern Nigeria, integrating many traditional institutions into the colonial administration. However, they also introduced significant changes, such as replacing aristocratic appointments with a modern bureaucracy and establishing technical departments. Loyalty to the British Crown and adherence to a bureaucratic ethos became prioritised over traditional sarauta values. The British frequently intervened in the selection of emirs, often disregarding traditional criteria, and granted emirs greater territorial authority than they had wielded in the pre-colonial era.

The sarauta system continued to evolve during the period of decolonisation and the formation of political parties in Nigeria. These changes posed new challenges to the system as it had to adapt to the demands of democracy. Traditional political norms of deference to hierarchy, longevity in office, and holding power were seen as having a negative influence on political opposition. Although formal governance has largely moved away from sarauta institutions, their influence remains deeply embedded in the political and cultural landscape of Northern Nigeria.

== Role of women ==
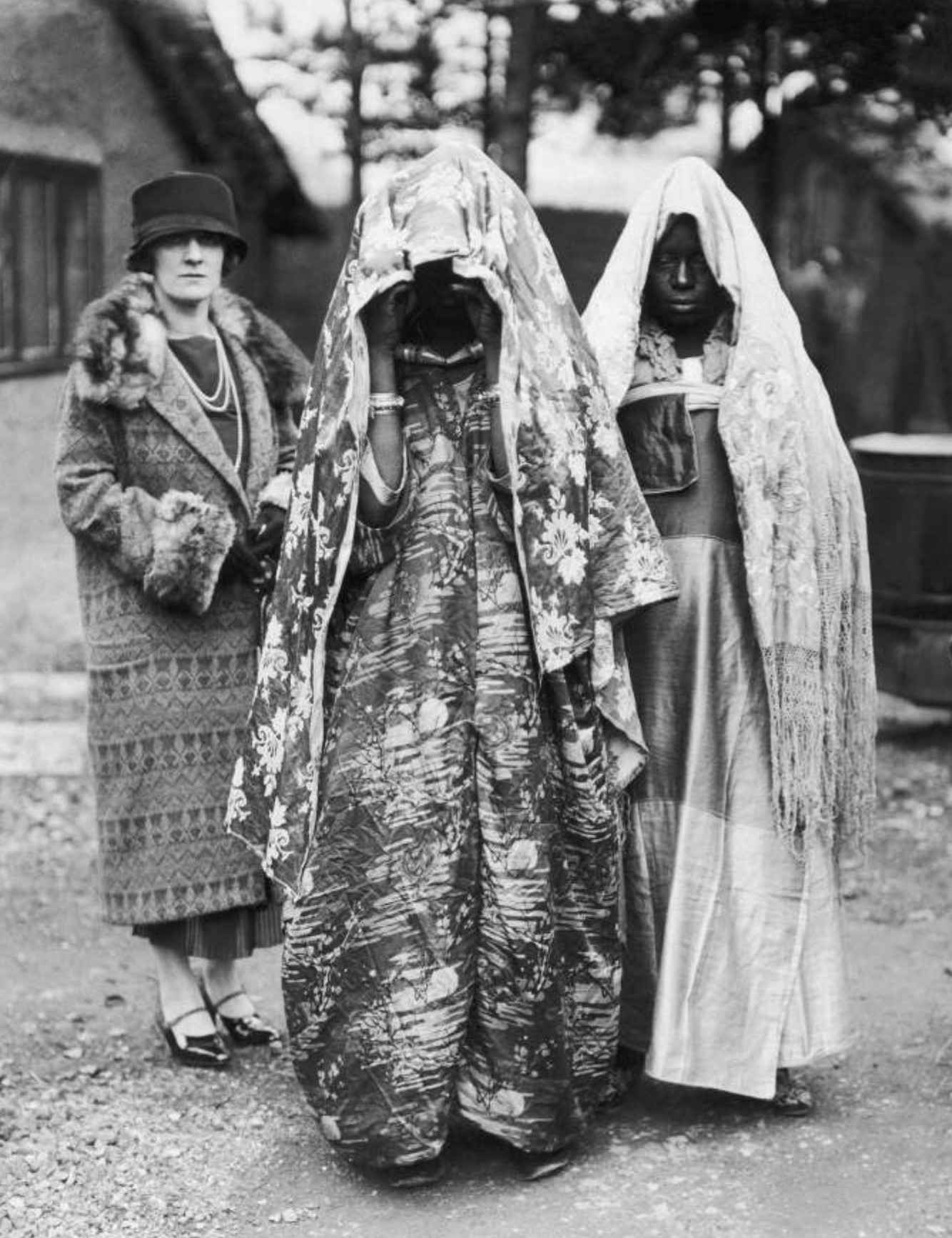
The wives of Sarkin Katsina Muhammadu Dikko, including Hajiya Ma’daki, with their British guide Mrs. G. S. Browne (left), during a tour of London in 1933

In the early history of Hausaland, women played important roles in the sarauta system. They could hold positions of authority, take part in public affairs, and were not legally restricted from holding office on the basis of gender. One of the most famous examples is Amina of Zazzau, who became Magajiya (Inheritor) at the age of sixteen and later ruled as Sauraniya (Queen) in 1576. Alongside her sister Zaria, she conquered vast territories, expanding Zazzau's influence beyond Hausaland.

The title of Magajiya traced back to the early queens of Daura, including Queen Daura herself. Although later replaced by male rulers, the Magajiya continued to wield considerable influence in Daura. She had the constitutional authority to countermand the orders of the chief and, if necessary, act to depose him. Other important titles reserved for women in the Hausa kingdoms included the Iya, who mediated between the ruler and lesser chiefs, and the Korama, who presided over grain sellers in the local markets.

Over time, women's overt political power diminished, likely due to the growing influence of Islam in Hausaland. During the reign of Sarkin Kano Muhammadu Rumfa (r. 1463–1499), who was influenced by the Amazigh jurist Muhammad al-Maghili, the practice of wife seclusion (auren kulle) was introduced at the royal court. Following the jihad of Usman dan Fodio in the early 19th century, the new rulers further restricted women's movement and titles that previously carried fiefs were explicitly taken away from women. These restrictions continued under British colonial rule, reinforced by "Victorian impressions of womanhood."

=== Daura ===
Traditionally known as the oldest Hausa state and first to adopt the sarauta system, Daura earliest rulers were queens. One account records that the dynasty began with the eponymous founder and was followed by eight more queens "each described as Magajiya, beginning with Gamata and ending with Shawata." Although this tradition gave way to an agnatic succession, women continued to exercise great powers. According to the constitutional doctrine of Daura, "the Magajiya could countermand the orders of the chief and might, if necessary, act to depose him... There can never be a chief in Daura without a Magajiya. The state of Daura remains incomplete without the Magajiya"

The Magajiya had two chief eunuchs, Kaura and Galadima, both of whom were powerful officials on the senior state council. Her powers did not allow her to countermand and overrule either of them. She could only countermand and overrule the sarki on the joint advice of the Kaura and Galadima. Any woman of the royal lineage who was deemed suitable by age, marital status, and personality could be appointed as Magajiya.

After the Magajiya, the most senior title reserved for women was Iya. She was responsible for overseeing all magicians and initiates of the spirit-possession cult (bori) throughout Daura. She also supervised the selection of successors when an office reserved for women of the dynasty fell vacant, including that of the Magajiya. If the sarki delayed appointing the chosen woman, the Iya was expected to do so herself before the assembled women of the royal lineage. Other important offices reserved for women included the Mai Daki, which was given to a ruler's favourite wife or daughter, and Korama who was an elderly free woman appointed by, and subordinate to, the Sarkin Pawa (Chief Butcher). Her responsibilities included collecting tax portions of articles sold by measure from market vendors, and presiding over grain sellers, volumes, and prices.

== See also ==
- Galadima
- Sokoto Caliphate
- Nigerian Chieftaincy
