= Nafata of Gobir =

Hausa Ruler

Sarki Nafata of Gobir (r. 1797–98), one of a series of rulers of the small Hausa state of Gobir, today in northern Nigeria is best remembered for his opposition to Fulani Islamic reformer Usman dan Fodio, who later led a popular uprising against the Gobir rulers, and established the Sokoto Caliphate.
