= Alkalawa =

Town, formal Capital of Gobir State

- Location within Nigeria
- 13°36′47″N 06°15′36″E
- Cultures: Hausa (Gobirawa and Zamfarawa)
- Location: Sabon Birni, Sokoto State, Nigeria
- Part of: Gobir

History
- Built: 1760s
- Abandoned: 3 October 1808

Site notes
- Condition: Abandoned

Alkalawa (Hausa: Alƙalawa) was the capital of the Hausa city-state of Gobir, in what is now northern Nigeria.

== History ==
Alkalawa was originally a quarter for an alkali ("judge" in Hausa) in the kingdom of Zamafara, hence the name Alkalawa. In the early 19th-century, Fulani jihadist Usman dan Fodio attacked Yunfa's forces (ruler of the kingdom of Gobir) at Alkalawa. The city fell in October 1808, marking the end of resistance to Fulani rule in the region.

== Bibliography ==
- Research and Documentation Directors Government House, Kano.Kano Millennium: 100 years in History.
