= Abd al-Salam of Kware =

19th century Hausa scholar (died 1818)

Mallam Abd al-Salam

Personal life
- Born: Mikaila bin Ibrahim
- Died: January 1818 Bakura, Zamfara
- Children: Alkali Muhammadu Mashayabo of Jandutsi and Muhammad Bukhari of Jega
- Parent: Ibrahim (father)
- Dynasty: Gimbanawa
- Occupation: preacher and teacher

Religious life
- Religion: Islam
- Denomination: Sunni
- Movement: Sokoto jihad

Muslim leader
- Dynasty: Gimbanawa

Military service
- Military career
- Allegiance: Sokoto Caliphate (until 1817); Kware state (1817–1818)
- Conflicts: Sokoto Jihad; Revolt of Abd al-Salam

Abd al-Salam bin Ibrahim (born Mikaila; died January 1818) was a ba-Are Hausa Islamic scholar and teacher who served as one of the principal commanders in the Sokoto Jihad (1804–1808) and later led a revolt against the Sokoto Caliphate in 1817.

A noted Sufi and teacher even before joining Usman dan Fodio's community, Abd al-Salam had already gathered a following among the Arewa Hausa. After becoming one of Usman's most fervant disciples at Degel, he founded the settlement of Gimbana following his own hijra from Gobir around 1797. The Gobir attack on Gimbana in 1803/4 and later ambush by Usman's followers on the Gobir army is often cited as what began Usman's jihad. During the jihad, Abd al-Salam served as one of the few non-Fulani commanders and played an important role in the movement's expansion into Kebbi and Zamfara.

When Usman divided the new Caliphate's territories in 1812, Abd al-Salam received only a small fief in Gwandu, which he considered unfair compared to the holdings given to the other leaders who were related to Usman. His dissatisfaction deepened into open discontent under Usman's successor, Muhammad Bello, whom he accused of corruption and injustice. From his base at Kware, Abd al-Salam gathered followers and corresponded with Bello before leading a revolt in 1817. The revolt ended in early 1818 with the sack of Kware and Abd al-Salam's death from wounds at Bakura.

Bello gave a detailed account of Abd al-Salam's revolt in his Sard al-kalam (c. 1818), presenting their correspondence and quoting his six letters and three from Abd al-Salam. Abd al-Salam's descendants, known as the Gimbanawa, later established the town of Jega, which developed into a major market centre in north-western Nigeria.

== Biography ==
=== Early life ===
Abd al-Salam's original name was Mikaila, and his father's name was Ibrahim. He was Hausa from the Arewa (or 'Northerners') subgroup, identified with the Mawri people centred around Dogondoutchi in present-day Niger.

Sometime in the 1790s, he moved to Gobir to study under Shehu Usman dan Fodio, an Islamic scholar who was leading a revivalist movement in Hausaland. Some traditions claim he had studied with the Shehu earlier in his youth. Abd al-Salam set up his camp close to Usman at Degel, and called it Dār as-salām ("House of Peace") and changed his name from Mikaila to Abd al-Salam ("Slave of Peace").

Even before his move to Degel, Abd al-Salam had gained a reputation as a scholar and had built a sizeable following of his own. He drew large numbers from converts from his people and others. Studying Abd al-Salam's letters, as preserved by his later rival Muhammad Bello in Sard al-Kalam (c. 1812), historian Murray Last suggests that Abd al-Salam may have been more of a preacher than a literary scholar. He describes the longest of the letters as stylistically and linguistically awkward, adding that its composition was better suited for an oral presentation.

=== Sokoto jihad and 1812 division of territories ===
Usman's religious movement became increasingly popular, attracting followers from across the region. This began to worry the sarauta (ruling class) of Gobir, who grew more hostile toward the Shehu and his followers. When Abd al-Salam suspected that the Gobir king, Nafata, was planning an attack on him, he and his followers made a hijra out of the kingdom and established the settlement of Gimbana in Kebbi periphery around 1797.

In 1803/4, Yunfa, Nafata's son and successor, sent a punitive expedition to capture Abd al-Salam. Yunfa's forces, led by the Emir of Gummi, attacked Gimbana but failed to seize Abd al-Salam, who escaped to a nearby Fulani fortress allied with Usman. The Gobir forces sacked Gimbana and enslaved many of its remaining inhabitants. On their return, they were ambushed by some of Usman's followers, among whom is said were led by Usman's brother Abdullahi, who freed the captives. This angered Yunfa, who ordered Usman to leave Gobir with his family but without his wider community. Since this meant the Degel community would be forced back under state control or destroyed, Usman ultimately withdrew with all his followers to Gudu, just outside Gobir.

Though tensions had long been rising between Sarkin Gobir Yunfa and Usman's community, the Gimbana affair is often cited as what started Usman's jihad, which lasted from 1804 until Yunfa was killed in 1808. Abd al-Salam was one of Usman's few prominent non-Fulani commanders during the jihad. When the new Caliphate came to rule vast territories, as Amir al-Mu'minin Usman divided authority among his leading commanders: the east went to his son Muhammad Bello, the west to his brother Abdullahi, the north under Ali Jedo, while the south was divided between his other son Muhammad Bukhari and Abd al-Salam, who was assigned seven villages in Gwandu, including Sabiyel (in present-day Aliero).

Dissatisfied with his share, Abd al-Salam began to expand his authority by force. As an effective preacher and leader, he continued to attract followers and move beyond his allocated area. Abdullahi, who as Emir of Gwandu was supervising Abd al-Salam and his community, objected to these expansionist methods, which were causing considerable friction locally, and accused him of sedition. Abd al-Salam eventually apologised to Usman and was transferred to Sokoto under Bello's supervision. He was later permitted to establish the town of Kware in a fertile valley nearby and was eventually granted permission to fortify it.

=== Discontent under Caliph Bello and eventual revolt ===
When Usman died in 1817, his son and successor Muhammad Bello was faced with several revolts against the Caliphate. Abd al-Salam and his community were among them, still feeling cheated by their share of the rewards after the jihad. After some hesistation, Abd al-Salam went to Sokoto and pledged allegiance to the new Amir al-Mu'minin Bello. He arrived on a Friday and made his pledge publicly after the jumu'ah prayer. While escorting him out of town, Bello promised to increase his territory, later confirming this in writing. He also added that, though he recognised that Abd al-Salam deserved more, he could only give additional lands when he was able.

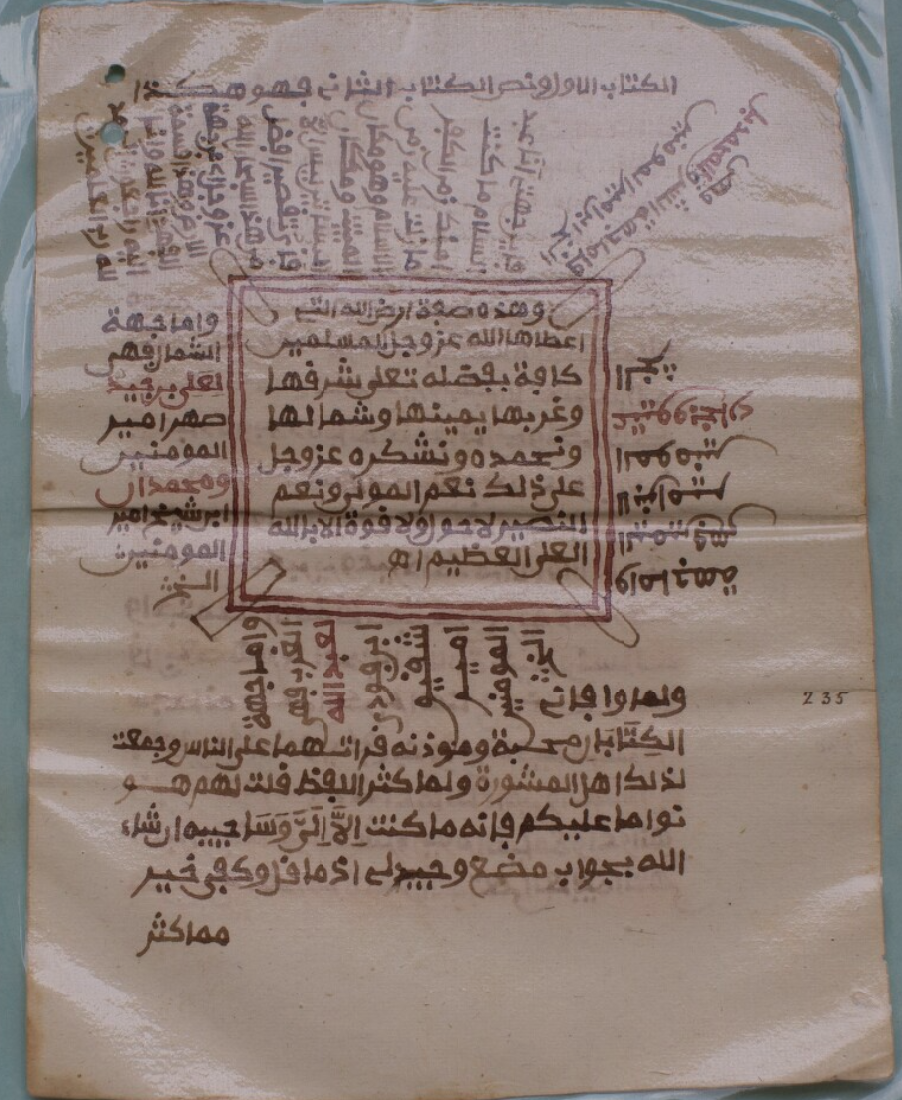
Abd al-Salam's illustration included in a copy of Sard al-Kalam

Around this time, Abd al-Salam's Kware became a flourishing town, its population growing as people seeking refuge from Sokoto arrived. When Bello commanded Abd al-Salam - like other regional rulers - to send him troops and cease communications with all rebels, Abd al-Salam instead sent a reply declaring Bello a ẓālim (oppressor) and arguing that obedience to an unjust ruler was not required under Islamic law. This, along with subsequent letters between him and Bello, were included in Bello's account of the revolt Sard al-kalam. In one of his letters, Abd al-Salam included a map to illustrate his small share of the 1812 division of territories compared with that given to the Fodiawa and other Fulani. This further supported his claim that the Caliphate had become a family affair and not a true Muslim community, and that he was justified in forming his own autonomous community of believers, refusing to cooperate with oppressors (azzalumai).

Imitating Usman's tactics during the pre-jihad years against Gobir, Abd al-Salam avoided direct conflict with the Sokoto state and instead tried to provoke Bello into striking first. This would allow him to accuse Bello of attacking fellow Muslims. To strengthen the comparison with Usman's early movement, he declared his settlement near Sokoto a safe haven for refugees fleeing Bello's suppression of dissent. He also traded openly with non-Muslims and released traders from Kware whose goods had been seized, justifying his actions by saying "obedience was not due to an oppressor who ‘transgressed the right [course]". Abd al-Salam often had such provocative acts carried out by "hotheads" (sufaha; in Hausa wawaye). The same term was used by Bello for his own followers who had attacked the Gobir column during the Gimbana affair to free its captives.

Bello continued to respond cautiously, adopting a conciliatory approach toward Abd al-Salam's insubordinate activities. When he learned that Abd al-Salam had welcomed the non-Muslim ruler of Kore to Kware, Bello wrote demanding that he send the ruler and his entourage to Sokoto. When Abd al-Salam refused, Bello summoned the ruler's brother and supported his takeover of Kore after the latter converted to Islam. Meanwhile, with Abd al-Salam's help, the former ruler of Kore returned and retook his throne. Because the Sokoto-installed ruler of Kore had become Muslim, Bello accused Abd al-Salam of helping a pagan king regain his throne. Abd al-Salam and his followers were thus labelled murtaddūn (apostates), renegades who had to be killed. It is unlikely that Abd al-Salam ever renounced Islam. His support for the ruler of Kore had more to do with ethnic solidarity in the face of perceived Fulani injustices than any change of faith according to historian Paul Naylor.

Despite his accusations, Bello still offered Abd al-Salam safe conduct to leave the Sokoto area and settle in Zamfara without interference. He also tried to isolate Abd al-Salam by writing to persuade (a) his wife and son, (b) the wives of his followers, and (c) his wider community to abandon Abd al-Salam and his ridda (apostasy). According to Bello, only a few accepted the offer, while others who attempted to negotiate peace were executed by Abd al-Salam. Bello's letters reportedly reached Abd al-Salam while he was repairing and refortifying Kware in anticipation of an attack. He never sent a formal reply.

=== Death and legacy ===
By late 1817, both sides had begun military confrontations that lasted until January 1818. Abd al-Salam's forces apparently outnumbered Bello's army two to one, as he had successfully rallied much of the local peasantry and several chiefs to his side. However, Bello's army eventually captured and sacked Kware in early 1818. During the retreat, Abd al-Salam was wounded and fled to Zamfara, where he died at Bakura.

A Hausa gibe mocking Abd al-Salam's death still survives:

an yi rabon kura;
ka tafi Bakura,
kura ta cinyaka da rana.

Translation:

[you said] a hyena did the dividing;
[well] you went to Bakura,
[and] the hyena took a bite of you in broad daylight.

The first line refers to the "hyena's share" which Abd al-Salam claimed was taken by Usman's family in the division of territory after the jihad. The irony lies in the fact that he ultimately died at a town called "No Hyena" (Bakura), and his body, reportedly buried there in haste, was said to have been dug up and eaten by hyenas.

In 1821, Abdullahi allowed Abd al-Salam's son Muhammadu Bukhari to establish the town of Jega, near Abd al-Salam's old settlement of Gimbana. His descendants and those of his followers, known as the Gimbanawa, settled around Jega, which became a major market centre in the region. By the early 20th century, Jega's markets rivaled those of Kano, the main commercial hub of Northern Nigeria.
