= 2023 Nigerian Senate elections in Sokoto State =

2023 Senate elections in Sokoto

← 2019	25 February 2023	2027 →

All 3 Sokoto State seats in the Senate of Nigeria
	Majority party	Minority party
Party	APC	PDP
Last election	2	1
Seats before	3	0
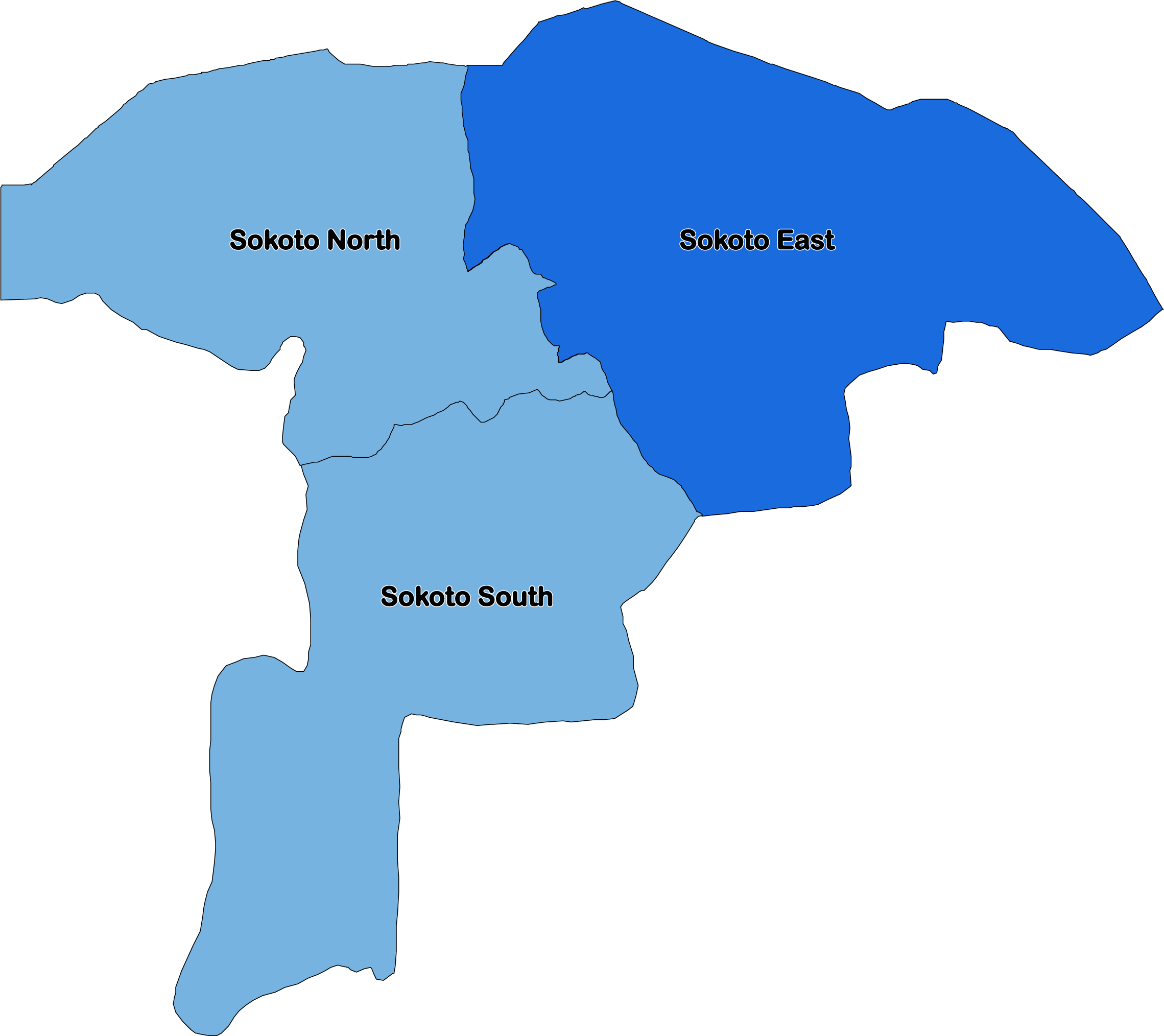
- APC incumbent retiring APC incumbent running for re-election

The 2023 Nigerian Senate elections in Sokoto State will be held on 25 February 2023, to elect the 3 federal Senators from Sokoto State, one from each of the state's three senatorial districts. The elections will coincide with the 2023 presidential election, as well as other elections to the Senate and elections to the House of Representatives; with state elections being held two weeks later. Primaries were held between 4 April and 9 June 2022.

== Background ==
In the previous Senate elections, all three incumbent senators were returned with Abdullahi Ibrahim Gobir (APC-East) winning re-election with 54% of the vote and Aliyu Magatakarda Wamakko (APC-Central) winning re-election with 54% as well while Ibrahim Abdullahi Danbaba (PDP-South) was returned after a court ruling later in 2019. The senatorial results were an example of the state's competitiveness as the APC won most House of Representatives seats and won a majority in the state House of Assembly but the PDP held the governorship even though Buhari won the state in the presidential election.

== Overview ==
Affiliation	Party		Total
Affiliation	APC	PDP	Total
Previous Election	2	1	3
Before Election	3	0	3
After Election	TBD	TBD	3

== Summary ==
District	Incumbent		Results	
District	Incumbent	Party	Status	Candidates
Sokoto East	Abdullahi Ibrahim Gobir	APC	Incumbent retired New member elected APC hold	▌ ✓ Ibrahim Lamido (APC); ▌Shu'aibu Gwanda Gobir (PDP)
Sokoto North	Aliyu Magatakarda Wamakko	APC	Incumbent re-elected	▌ ✓ Aliyu Magatakarda Wamakko (APC); ▌Manir Dan Iya (PDP)
Sokoto South	Ibrahim Abdullahi Danbaba	APC (Note: This senator was elected as a member of the PDP but switched to the APC during their term.)	Incumbent lost re-election New member electedPDP gain	▌Ibrahim Abdullahi Danbaba (APC); ▌ ✓ Aminu Waziri Tambuwal (PDP)

== Sokoto East ==
2023 Sokoto East Senatorial District election
← 2019	25 February 2023	2027 →
Nominee	Ibrahim Lamido	Shu'aibu Gwanda Gobir
Party	APC	PDP
Senator before election
Abdullahi Ibrahim Gobir
APC
Elected Senator
TBD

The Sokoto East Senatorial District covers the local government areas of Gada, Goronyo, Gwadabawa, Illela, Isa, Rabah, Sabon Birni, and Wurno. Incumbent Abdullahi Ibrahim Gobir (APC) was elected with 54.2% of the vote in 2019. Ibrahim Gobir opted to run for governor of Sokoto State instead of seeking re-election; he came second in the APC gubernatorial primary.

=== General election ===
==== Results ====
2023 Sokoto East Senatorial District election
Party	Candidate	Votes	%
APP	Imamu Umar Sanusi		
APC	Ibrahim Lamido		
APGA	Bello Achida Bilyaminu		
LP	Ashiru Namadina		
NRM	Ibrahim Abubakar		
New Nigeria Peoples Party	Dahiru Abdullahi		
PRP	Bello Isah Holai		
PDP	Shu'aibu Gwanda Gobir		
SDP	Mohammed Ibrahim		
ZLP	Aminu Bello		
Total votes			100.00%
Invalid or blank votes			N/A
Turnout			

== Sokoto North ==
2023 Sokoto North Senatorial District election
← 2019	25 February 2023	2027 →
Nominee	Aliyu Magatakarda Wamakko	Manir Dan Iya
Party	APC	PDP
Senator before election
Aliyu Magatakarda Wamakko
APC
Elected Senator
TBD

The Sokoto North Senatorial District covers the local government areas of Binji, Gudu, Kware, Silame, Sokoto North, Sokoto South, Tangaza, and Wamako. Incumbent Aliyu Magatakarda Wamakko (APC), who was elected with 54.5% of the vote in 2019, is seeking re-election.

=== General election ===
==== Results ====
2023 Sokoto North Senatorial District election
Party	Candidate	Votes	%
APP	Ahmed Muazu Sidi		
ADC	Faruku Muhammad		
APC	Aliyu Magatakarda Wamakko		
APGA	Modi Aliyu Abubakar		
NRM	Abubakar Manu Gumbi		
New Nigeria Peoples Party	Nayaba Shuaibu Mohammed		
PRP	Ibrahim Ghazali Abdullahi		
PDP	Manir Dan Iya		
SDP	Abdullahi Aminu		
Total votes			100.00%
Invalid or blank votes			N/A
Turnout			

== Sokoto South ==
2023 Sokoto South Senatorial District election
← 2019	25 February 2023	2027 →
Nominee	Ibrahim Abdullahi Danbaba	Aminu Waziri Tambuwal
Party	APC	PDP
Senator before election
Ibrahim Abdullahi Danbaba
APC
Elected Senator
TBD

The Sokoto South Senatorial District covers the local government areas of Bodinga, Dange Shuni, Kebbe, Shagari, Tambuwal, Tureta, and Yabo. In the 2019 election, Abubakar Shehu Tambuwal (APC) initially won and was sworn in as senator in June; however, his election was overturned in October and the victory awarded to Ibrahim Abdullahi Danbaba (PDP). In April 2022, Abdullahi Danbaba defected to the APC and he is seeking re-election.

=== General election ===
==== Results ====
2023 Sokoto South Senatorial District election
Party	Candidate	Votes	%
ADC	Faruku Mohammad		
APC	Ibrahim Abdullahi Danbaba		
APGA	Rabi'u Umar		
LP	Abubakar Umar		
NRM	Saidu Buda		
New Nigeria Peoples Party	Aliyu Abubakar Sanyinna		
PDP	Aminu Waziri Tambuwal		
SDP	Bala Labbo		
ZLP	Bashir Mohammad		
Total votes			100.00%
Invalid or blank votes			N/A
Turnout			

== See also ==
- 2023 Nigerian Senate election
- 2023 Nigerian elections
- 2023 Sokoto State elections
