= Revolt of Abd al-Salam =

Date	September 1817 – January 1818
Location	Kware (now in Sokoto state, Nigeria) 13°12′54.6″N 5°15′58.4″E
Result	Sokoto victory

Belligerents
Sokoto Caliphate; Sultanate of Aïr	Kware rebels; Kore; Gobirawa; Kebbawa; Zamfarawa

Commanders and leaders
Muhammad Bello; Muhammad Ghumma of Aïr; Ali Jedo; Muhammad Namoda	Abd al-Salam of Kware (DOW); Sarkin Banaga of Zamfara; Emir of Kore
- Location within Nigeria

Abd al-Salam's revolt (Hausa: Tāwāyēn Abd al-Salam) was an early 19th century uprising against the Sokoto Caliphate led by Abd al-Salam of Kware, a Ba-Are Hausa scholar and one of the principal disciples of Shehu Usman dan Fodio, founder of the Caliphate. Taking place between 1817 and 1818, soon after Usman's death, the revolt was among the most serious internal challenges faced by his successor, Muhammad Bello. Although it began as a dispute over the distribution of territories following Usman's 1812 division of authorities, the conflict exposed broader tensions within the Caliphate leadership, including rivalry among the Fodiawa, ethnic divisions between Hausa and Fulani elites, and differing interpretations of religious and political legitimacy and justice.

Abd al-Salam had been among the few non-Fulani commanders in Usman's jihad and played an important role in events leading to up to it, notably the Gobir attack on Gimbana, the settlement he founded after performing his own hijra from Gobir. The Gobirawa assault on Gimbana, and the jihadists' intervention to release its captives, is often cited as the event that triggered Usman's jihad in 1804. Following the establishment of the Caliphate, Usman's 1812 division of territories assigned Abd al-Salam seven villages in Gwandu, far smaller than those given to Fulani leaders. Dissatisfied, he attempted to expand his influence by force, leading to his reassignment to Kware under Bello's supervision. This deepened Abd al-Salam's resentment and later formed the basis of his accusation that Bello had treated him and other Hausa unfairly.

On Usman's death in 1817, his successor Bello faced several challenges to his legitimacy as Amir al-Mu'minin, including that of his uncle Abdullahi dan Fodio. Among these, Abd al-Salam's revolt was the most threatening. From Kware, he gathered followers among disaffected Hausa and dhimmis, accusing Bello of being an oppressor (zalim) and of violating the principles of justice established by the Shehu. In his account of the revolt, Sard al-kalam, Bello presented their correspondence, quoting his six letters and three from Abd al-Salam. In one of his letters to Bello, Abd al-Salam drew a map of the Caliphate to illustrate his small share of the 1812 division and argued that the unity of Muslims was meaningless when founded on injustice, and arguing that obedience to an unjust ruler was not required under Islamic law. His appeal resonated particularly among Hausa communities who felt marginalised within the new Fulani elite.

Bello initially adopted a conciliatory attitude toward Abd al-Salam's insubordinate activities. However, when his appeasement policy eventually proved futile, he accused Abd al-Salam of apostasy (ridda), citing his defiance and alliance with non-Muslims against the Caliphate as acts of muwalat (friendship with unbelievers). He framed the revolt as both political rebellion and religious deviation. The ensuing conflict ended with the sack of Kware and Abd al-Salam's death. The revolt existed within wider ideological debate within the Caliphate's leadership. Bello's uncle and Usman's vizier Abdullahi, who shared some of Abd al-Salam's reservations about the Caliphate's direction even while the jihad was still ongoing, had argued that succession should rest on piety rather than bloodline and that aiding unbelievers against Muslims was a sin (ma'siya) rather than disbelief (kufr). Bello rejected this distinction, using his suppression of the revolt to assert that defiance of the Caliph constituted apostasy and thereby legitimising coercion as a means of preserving unity and avoiding fitna. His account of the revolt in Sard al-Kalam remains one of the most important contemporary sources for examining political, religious, and social circumstances in the early Sokoto Caliphate.

== Background ==
=== Sokoto Jihad and division of authority ===
During the late 18th century, a religious movement began in the Kingdom of Gobir, led by the local Fulani scholar Shehu Usman dan Fodio, who sought to reform Islam in the region. He accused the Muslim rulers of the Central Sudan of rampant syncretism and urged them to embrace 'true' Islam. His revivalist movement eventually grew in size, attracting scholars from across Hausaland, which alarmed the Gobir ruling class. Among these followers was Mikhail dan Ibrahim, a ba-Are Hausa scholar with a following of his own. Around the 1790s, he became one of Usman's students, setting up camp near the Shehu's house at Degel. Mikhail called this camp "Dār as-salām" ("House of Peace") and subsequently changed his name to Abd al-Salam ("Slave of Peace").

Expecting an attack from Gobir, Abd al-Salam undertook a hijra around 1797. With his followers, they established a settlement, Gimbana, in Kebbi. In 1803/4, Sarkin Gobir Yunfa sent an expedition to capture Abd al-Salam. He managed to escape, but the Gobir force sacked Gimbana, and, on their return to Gobir, the army was intercepted by Usman's followers, who forced them to release the captives, much to Yunfa's annoyance. This affair is often cited as the incident that sparked the jihad. Soon after, Yunfa ordered Usman out of Gobir, which began Usman's hijra to Gudu in February 1804, with the first battles of his jihad following soon after.

Described by Muhammad Bello as the leader of his Arewa people, Abd al-Salam was one of the few prominent non-Fulani commanders in Usman's jihad. With Yunfa's death during the final siege of his capital, Alkalawa, the jihad ended in 1808. By that time, Usman was recognised as the Amir al-mu'minin (Commander of the Faithful) by much of the region's Muslims. Around 1812, Usman divided the authority of his vast Caliphate, which now expanded beyond the frontiers of Hausaland, among his leading commanders. The eastern territories fell to Muhammad Bello, the western parts to his brother Abdullahi, the north under Ali Jedo, while the south was divided between Muhammad Bukhari and Abd al-Salam, who was assigned seven villages in Gwandu, including Sabiyel (in Aliero today), to supervise. Dissatisfied with his share, Abd al-Salam preparing for revolt, and contacted groups discontented with the Caliphate, including Kebbawa rebels and his own Arewa people. However, his plans were discovered, and he was transferred to Sokoto under Bello's supervision. He was allowed to build a walled town nearby at Kware, which later grew in wealth and size.

=== Discontent under Caliph Muhammad Bello ===
When Usman died in 1817, his son and successor Muhammad Bello had to deal with several revolts against the Caliphate. Among them was Abd al-Salam's, who, from Kware, made contacts with enemies of the Caliphate, particularly among the aggrieved Hausawa and dhimmis. (Note: Ahl al-dhimma, or dhimmi, is a historical term used to refer to non-Muslims who were protected and permitted to maintain their beliefs under an Islamic state in exchange for some obligations such as paying a jizya (poll tax). In the Sokoto Caliphate they were "peoples who submitted to the Sokoto Caliphate, yet retained their identity and customs," especially the Hausa animists known as the Maguzawa.) Upon Bello's succession, Abd al-Salam only offered his allegiance after some hesitation. His walled town of Kware grew in size and population as more people sought refuge from Sokoto. As his relationship with the Sokoto leadership deteriorated, Abd al-Salam eventually sent two letters to Caliph Bello outlining his grievances. Both letters, along with subsequent letters from Abd al-Salam, were quoted in full in Bello's account of the revolt Sard al-kalam fi ma jara bayn-na wa-bayn 'Abd al-Salam.

From this account, the first letter contained several quotations and sayings from a variety of Islamic sources, including Qur'anic verses and Hadiths. He used these selected quotes to emphasise the importance of justice in an Islamic state, and accused the Caliphate of being unjust and corrupt. Hence, he claimed, it was incumbent upon him as a Muslim to peacefully dissociate from Bello's community, according to "the Qur'an, the Sunna, and the ijma' (scholarly consensus)."

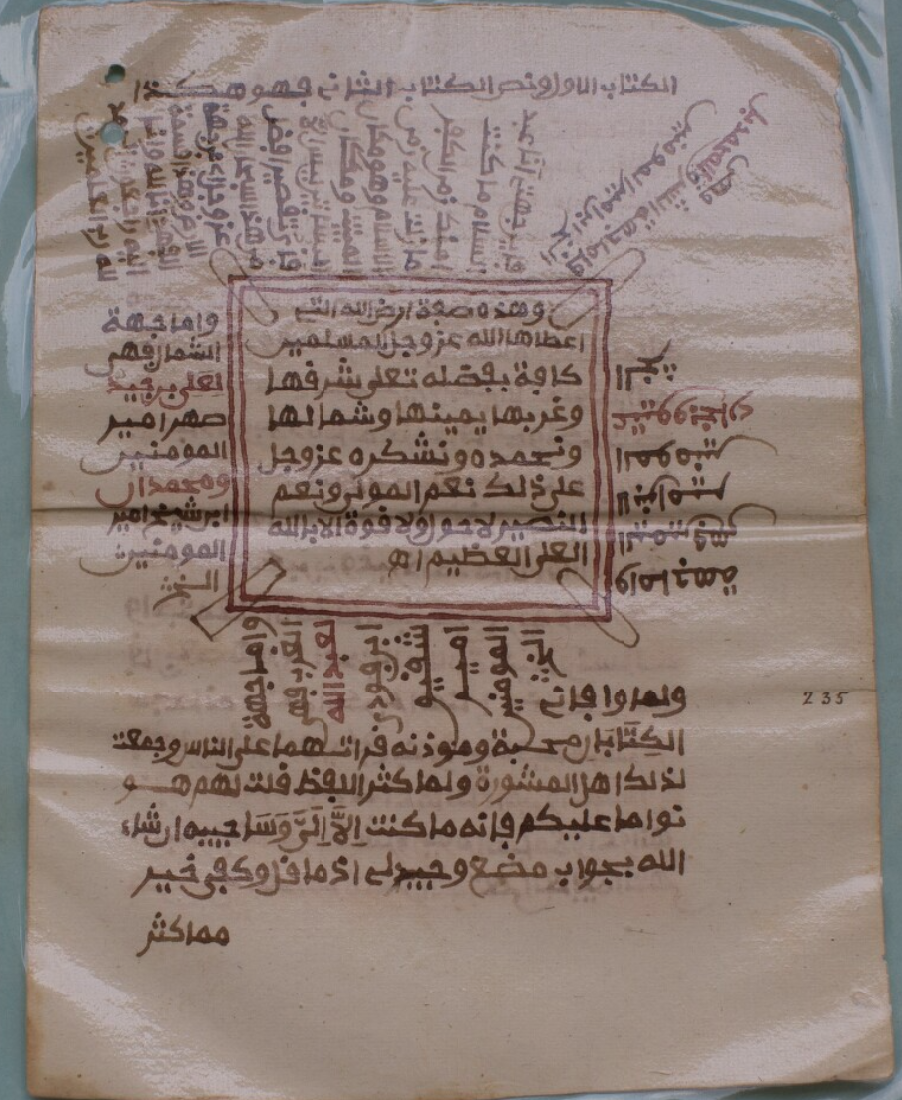
Abd al-Salam's illustration included in a copy of Sard al-Kalam

In the second letter, Abd al-Salam included an illustration and six labels:

- The first label was placed in the middle of the illustration: "This is a description of the land of Allah to Whom belong might and majesty, which Allah, to Whom belong might and majesty, gave, through His favor–exalted be He–, to Muslims as a whole with respect to its east, west, south and north. We praise and thank Him to Whom belong might and majesty for that."
- The second label was above the first of which he describes as: "As for the east region, it belongs to Muhammad Bello, the son of the Commander of the Faithful, 'Uthman."
- The third label was below the first of which he describes as: "As for the west region, it belongs to 'Abd Allah bn Fudi, the full brother of the Commander of the Faithful (Uthman). This is what I made some allusion to just as the eulogist said, 'I made an allusion to the necessity with a part [of it]'."
- The fourth label was on the right of the first of which he describes as: "As for the south region, it belongs to the two sons of the Commander of the Faithful (Uthman), 'Atiq and Bukhari."
- The fifth label was on the left of the first of which he describes as: "As for the north region, it belongs to 'Ali bn Jaydu, the son-in-law of the Commander of the Faithful (Uthman), and Muhammadan, the son of the master (Jibril ibn Umar) of the Commander of the Faithful (Uthman)."
- Lastly, the sixth label was between the second and the fifth of which he describes as: "And where is the region of mine, me, 'Abd al-Salam? It is what I possessed in the time of unbelief (before the Sokoto Jihad) that I still possess in the time of Islam; it is nothing but a place to reside and a place of some gardens (farmlands). Any restriction is better than this–may Allah to Whom belong might and majesty be praised–, namely, [the restriction] with respect to the land. This is the fate of time. Verily we belong to Allah and return to Him. Praise be to Allah, the Lord of the worlds."

The two letters were delivered to Sokoto by Abd al-Salam's Qadi and Muezzin. In Bello's reply, he began by dismissing the accusation of widespread injustice in the Caliphate, claiming that "we are free from injustice... except for slips and lapses. And we repent and ask [Allah's] pardon [for those slips and lapses]." Caliph Bello then cautioned Abd al-Salam against associating with harbis (people of war). He ended the letter with:

As for your statement that we are neglectful of your share in terms of land, know that your value was not hidden to us, and that we were not ignorant of your claim to more than what you mentioned. However, capability is a condition of judgements and free disposal. Therefore, we–if Allah wills–will allot an abundant share to you.

Upon receiving the letter, Abd al-Salam was reported to have said aloud, "Who assigns [lands] to us? The land is in our hands today," and he never formally replied Bello. He continued as before, maintaining contact with Sokoto's enemies, including known rebels of the Caliphate like the Zamfarawa under Sarkin Tleta (Mafara) and the Banaga. He also welcomed into his community the Emir of Kore, a non-Muslim ruler of the largest town to the north of Sokoto. Bello again wrote to Abd al-Salam, warning him against harbouring enemies of the Caliphate and instructing him to send the Emir and his entourage to Sokoto. Abd al-Salam refused Bello's demand, and was reported as saying "I deem it best not to send them because I am like one of themselves." In response, Bello summoned the Emir's brother to Sokoto and installed him as Emir of Kore after his conversion to Islam. Meanwhile, the erstwhile Emir of Kore, aided by Abd al-Salam, returned to Kore and retook his rule. Because the Sokoto-installed Emir had become a Muslim, this allowed Bello to accuse Abd al-Salam of helping a pagan king regain his throne and therefore of apostacy.

== Tawaye ==
At some point during their correspondence, Bello received word that Abd al-Salam had declared a 'tawaye' (revolt in Hausa). In Sard al-kalam, Bello accused Abd al-Salam of allying with the Emir of Kore in raiding several Fulani villages and towns. Bello then summoned Ali Jedo, Commander of the Army (Amir al-jaish), and dispatched raiding parties of his own. Battles and skirmishes erupted in various areas around the Sokoto region as both sides sent raiding parties to towns and plantations.

Caliph Bello then dispatched three letters. The first was sent to Abd al-Salam, offering a peace deal to avoid fitna, proposing that, if accepted, Abd al-Salam would be permitted to choose any land in Zamfara and live there peacefully without interference from Sokoto. If rejected, Bello warned that "the sin of those with you and of those with us regarding what happens is upon you." The second letter was addressed to "al-Bukhari (Abd al-Salam's son); his mother, Umm al-Khayr; and all the Muslim women." In it, Bello reiterated the peace offer and emphasised that the conflict was not with him or his family. In the final letter, directed to Abd al-Salam's community, Bello claimed that his intentions were not to harm them. He warned that if Abd al-Salam did not move away from Sokoto, Bello's army would attack, urging them instead to emigrate with their families. However, Bello assured them that if Abd al-Salam accepted the peace offer, he would not interfere with their activities. He then ended the letter with: "We have already spread spies and sent [messages] to troops in all regions. This is our state. Peace." Although he was said to have received the letters, Abd al-Salam did not respond to Bello. The Emir of Aïr, along with other scholars, attempted to avert further hostilities but was unsuccessful.

Around November 1817, Bello sent an army to Kware, but it was defeated. His subsequent strategy involved sending repeated raiding parties, which proved highly effective. Soon, this began to take its toll on Abd al-Salam's large army. The skirmishes continued on until 5 January 1818, when Bello mustered a large force, including reinforcements from the Emir of Aïr, under the command of Ali Jedo and Muhammad Namoda. Abd al-Salam also received reinforcements, and his army now comprised rebels from Arewa, Gobir, Zamfara, and Kebbi, as well as forces from Kore. Bello's army marched on the fortified town of Kware, which was swiftly taken according to Bello. The town was sacked, and its remaining inhabitants, who fled toward Zamfara, were pursued and killed. During the pursuit, Abd al-Salam was hit by an arrow but reportedly managed to flee to Bakura in Zamfara, where he died of his wounds three days later.

== Aftermath ==
There a number of Hausa gibes and sayings against Abd al-Salam. For example:

an yi rabon kura;
ka tafi Bakura,
kura ta cinyaka da rana.

Translation:

[you said] a hyena did the dividing;
[well] you went to Bakura,
[and] the hyena took a bite of you in broad daylight.

The first line refers to the "hyena's share" which Abd al-Salam claimed was taken by Usman's family in the division of territory after the jihad. The irony lies in the fact that he ultimately died at a town called "No Hyena" (Bakura), and his body, reportedly buried there in haste, was dug up, so the story goes, and eaten by hyenas.

Several other revolts erupted in Gobir and Kebbi in January 1818, the most intense being at Kalambaina, where some remaining followers of Abd al-Salam had now gathered. It held out against Gwandu until 1821, when a force led by Bello successfully captured it. In the same year, Emir of Gwandu Abdullahi permitted Muhammad Bukhari, Abd al-Salam's son, to establish the town of Jega, near Abd al-Salam's old town of Gimbana.

== Sard al-kalam ==
Much of what is known about Abd al-Salam and his revolt comes from Muhammad Bello's Sard al-kalam fi ma jara bayn-na wa-bayn 'Abd al-Salam ("The dialogue that passed between me and Abd al-Salam"). Bello appears to quote in full letters from Abd al-Salam highly critical of trends in Sokoto, which, according to Murray Last, "give the book a tone of authenticity." Copies of the book, originally written in Arabic, are widely available in Nigeria, including at the Library of Bayero University, Kano and at the National Archives, Kaduna. The copies preserved at the National Archives were digitised by the Endangered Archives Programme of the British Library. A Hausa translation was published in the first volume of Labarun Hausawa da Makwabtansu (Zaria, 1932) by R M East. In 1986, Rainer Osswald published the Arabic text and a German translation. Using manuscripts held at the National Archives of Nigeria in Kaduna, Kariya Kota edited and published the Arabic text and an English translation in 2018.
