= Manir =

Manir may refer to:

- Manir (state constituency), a state constituency in Terengganu, Malaysia
- Manir, Alberta, a locality in the Municipal District of Spirit River No. 133
- Manir Dan Iya, Nigerian politician
