= Muhammad Bukhari bin Uthman =

Muhammadu Bukhari محمد البخاري

Emir of Tambawel
- Reign: 1812–1840
- Predecessor: position established
- Successor: Umar
- Born: 12 November 1784; Degel, Gobir (in modern day Sokoto State)
- Died: 27 February 1840 (aged 55)
- Issue: Umar, Sarkin Tambawel; Barau, Sarkin Yamma; Ali, Sarkin Kudu; Aisha; Modibbo, Sarkin Tambawel; Among others
- Father: Usman dan Fodio
- Occupation: poet
- Relatives: Muhammad Bukhari bin Ahmad (grandson)
- Military career
- Allegiance: Sokoto Caliphate
- Conflicts: Sokoto Jihad (1804-1808); Battle of Birnin-Kebbi (1805); Pacification of Gwandu; Battle of Ilorin (1836); Revolt of Abd al-Salam (1817- 1818); Battle of Kalambaina (1820)

Muhammad Bukhari bin al-Shaikh Uthman (Arabic: محمد البخاري ابن عثمان ابن فودي, romanized: Muḥammad al-Bukhārī bin ʿUthmān bin Fūdī; 1785–1840) was an Islamic scholar and a noted poet who was the first Emir of Tambawel. Bukhari was an important military commander who participated in and led several military campaigns during the jihad of Usman dan Fodio.

== Early life ==
Muhammad Bukhari was born in Degel, a small town in the Hausa kingdom of Gobir. His father Usman dan Fodio was a noted Islamic scholar and preacher from the Fulani clan of Torodbe. His mother Aisha came from a family with a long tradition of scholarship. Bukhari studied under his father, and his uncle, Abdullahi. Because he was raised in Abdullahi's house, Bukhari dedicated much of his life to his uncle. Among his other teachers was al-Mustafa bin Muhammad al-Turudi, a scribe for Usman, and the father of the Sokoto scholar Abd al-Qadir dan Tafa.

== Life ==
Bukhari was one of the eight commanders of the Sokoto jihad. He participated in campaigns in the southern region of the Sokoto Caliphate, including Nupe, alongside his cousin Muhammad Wani, Abdullahi's son. He was also actively involved in the Gwandu campaigns, aimed at pacifying the region. In 1805, Bukhari joined Abdullahi's forces in a campaign against the Hausa kingdom of Kebbi. After the fall of Birnin-Kebbi, the Sarkin Kebbi, Muhammadu Hodi, fled the capital. Later, in 1816, Hodi mounted a fierce resistance against the Caliphate from his strongholds in Kimba, Augi, and Argungu, which ultimately ended in 1826 when he was killed by Bukhari. He also campaigned in Talata Mafara, Katsina, Yauri and Kotonkoro.

After the jihad was won in 1808, Usman dan Fodio appointed his brother Abdullahi to govern the western and southern regions of the Caliphate. Abdullahi tasked Bukhari with overseeing the southern territories of his emirate. Around this period, Bukhari founded the fief of Tambawel which grew to become the main ribat (frontier stronghold) in the southern regions of the Caliphate, second only to Gwandu. However, the importance of the fief diminished during the reign of Caliph Abu Bakr Atiku (1837–1842). Starting in 1812, Bukhari was also tasked with administering Nupe after Abdullahi retired from government affairs.

In January 1818, a fierce revolt broke out in Kalambaina, a town near Gwandu. The rebels were followers of Abd al-Salam, who had also rebelled against the Caliphate a month earlier. The Kalambaina revolt lasted two years until a combined force led by Caliph Muhammad Bello, Atiku, Bukhari, and Wani successfully captured the town. The victory at Kalambaina reunited Gwandu and Sokoto, who had experienced slight hostilities after Abdullahi was passed over in favour of Bello to succeed Usman as Sarkin Musulmi in 1817.

In 1836, the emirate of Ilorin faced an attack from a combined force of Oyo and Borgu. Bukhari, alongside his cousin Muhammad Sambo, led an army consisting of forces from both Sokoto and Gwandu to aid in the defense of Ilorin. Although the Oyo-Borgu forces initially pushed Bukhari's army back to Ilorin, their morale collapsed after the Sarkin Borgu, alongside several other important Oyo and Borgu figures, was killed in battle, allowing the Sokoto-Gwandu forces to successfully defend the city. The conflict also led to the death of the last Alaafin of Oyo, leading to the eventual fall of the Yoruba empire.

Following the death of Bello in 1837, there was no clear successor as he refused to name one. Bukhari and his older brother Abu Bakr Atiku were the leading candidates. After much deliberation, the Council of Electors chose Atiku as the new Caliph. Despite Bukhari's distinguished military record (particularly his successes in Ilorin the previous year), and his reputation as a poet, he was passed over. Some suggest this was due to his ghazal poems, while others believe it was because he had suffered a leg injury after falling from his horse, breaking his leg at the critical juncture, making him unfit for office.

Muhammadu Buhari bin Ahmed, Waziri of Sokoto (1886–1910). He was Buhari's grandson through his mother Aisha.

Bukhari died in 1840. His sister Nana Asma'u wrote him an elegy. He was succeeded as Emir of Tambawel by his son Umar. His daughter's son Muhammad Bukhari (named after him) became Waziri of Sokoto (1886–1910). Among his other descendants is Ibrahim Dasuki, who was Sultan of Sokoto from 1988 to 1996.

== Writings ==
Bukhari was a noted scholar and poet who wrote in classical Arabic. Today, twenty of his qasa'id survive and are preserved around Nigeria. He was also known for his controversial ghazal poems.
