= Arewa (Niger) =

Coordinates: 13°46′N 4°00′E

Arewa is a small pre-colonial animist dominated state of the Dallol Maouri valley of Niger, known for the indigenous Maouri/Mawri Hausa culture.

== Contemporary rule ==
Arewa's traditional leadership continues a largely ceremonial reign in the 21st century, centered just north of the town of Dogondoutchi. Arewa, still home to a shrinking animist Hausa community, hosts a yearly religious festival which draws both believers and foreign tourists.

== Other usage ==
Arewa is simply a Hausa language term meaning "northern" or "northerners". Derived from the Hausa word for "North", "Areoun", the "-wa" the typical "People of" suffix, Arewa has several alternate meanings specific to the geography and politics of modern Nigeria, south of Niger.

== Notable people ==
- Abd al-Salam of Kware

== See also ==
- Arewa: for the more general usages of the term in Nigeria.
