= Idris Muhammad Gobir =

"Nigerian Politician","Deputy Governor Sokoto State"

His Excellency Idris Mohammed Gobir
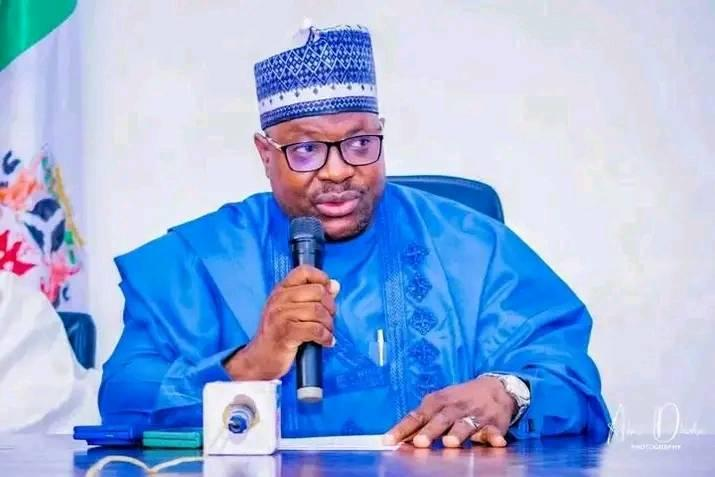
- Idris Mohammed Gobir

Deputy Governor of Sokoto State
- Incumbent
- Assumed office 29 May 2023
- Governor: Ahmad Aliyu
- Preceded by: Manir Dan Iya

Personal details
- Born: 1976 (age 49–50)
- Party: All Progressives Congress
- Education: Ahmadu Bello University
- Occupation: Politician

Idris Muhammad Gobir is a Nigerian politician who has served as the deputy governor of Sokoto State since the 2023 Nigerian gubernatorial elections. He was elected deputy governor alongside the governor, Ahmad Aliyu, during the 2023 election.

== Education ==
Gobir graduated from Ahmadu Bello University in Zaria and also have master degrees in five different disciplines.

== Political career ==
Gobir served as the Commissioner for Budget and Economic Planning and also a Sole Administrator of Sabon Birnin Local Government Area of Sokoto State during the former Governor Aliyu Wamakko.
