= Ahmad Aliyu =

Nigerian politician (born 1970)

His Excellency Ahmad Aliyu

Governor of Sokoto State
- Incumbent
- Assumed office 29 May 2023
- Deputy: Idris Muhammad Gobir
- Preceded by: Aminu Tambuwal

Deputy Governor of Sokoto State
- In office 29 May 2015 – 14 November 2018
- Governor: Aminu Tambuwal
- Preceded by: Muktar Shagari
- Succeeded by: Manir Dan Iya

Personal details
- Born: Ahmad Aliyu; 1 January 1970 (age 56) Sokoto, North-Western State, Nigeria (now in Sokoto State)
- Party: All Progressives Congress
- Occupation: Politician

Ahmad Aliyu Sokoto (born 1 January 1970) is a Nigerian politician who is the Governor of Sokoto State. He was a former commissioner and was the deputy governor of Sokoto State from 2015 until his resignation in 2018.

== Biography ==
Ahmed Aliyu was born on 1 January 1970, in Tudun wada at Sokoto metropolis, Sokoto state, Nigeria. He has worked as a cashier, an auditor and an accountant. He was deputy director of Finance and Supply, Sabon-Birni Local Government, 1996 to 1998; Director of Finance and Supply, Kebbe Local Chief Accountant Local Government Service Commission, 2004 to 2007. He was a two-term Commissioner and the first Executive Secretary of Police Trust Fund (PTF).

In May 2023, Ahmad Aliyu completed his Doctorate Degree in Business Administration at the Nasarawa State University.

Life Blessing

Ahmed Aliyu in company of President Bola Ahmed Tinubu entered the Holy Ka'aba along side other delegation on the 2 November 2026.
