= 2019 Nigerian Senate elections in Sokoto State =

2019 Nigerian Senate election in Sokoto State

The 2019 Nigerian Senate election in Sokoto State was held on February 23, 2019, to elect members of the Nigerian Senate to represent Sokoto State. Aliyu Magatakarda Wamakko representing Sokoto North, Shehu Abubakar Tambuwal representing Sokoto South and Abdullahi Ibrahim Gobir representing Sokoto East all won on the platform of All Progressives Congress. But the Court of Appeal Sokoto Division on 30 October 2019 sacked Shehu Abubakar Tambuwal representing Sokoto South on the platform of All Progressives Congress. Ibrahim Abdullahi Danbaba on the platform of Peoples Democratic Party replaced the sacked senator.

== Overview ==
Affiliation	Party		Total
Affiliation	APC	PDP	Total
Before Election	3	0	3
After Election	2	1	3

== Summary ==
District	Incumbent	Party	Elected Senator	Party
Sokoto North	Aliyu Magatakarda Wamakko	APC	Aliyu Magatakarda Wamakko	APC
Sokoto South	Ibrahim Abdullahi Danbaba	APC	Ibrahim Abdullahi Danbaba	PDP
Sokoto East	Abdullahi Ibrahim Gobir	APC	Abdullahi Ibrahim Gobir	APC

== Results ==
=== Sokoto North ===
A total of 39 candidates registered with the Independent National Electoral Commission to contest in the election. APC candidate Aliyu Magatakarda Wamakko won the election, defeating PDP Ahmed Muhammad Maccido and 37 other party candidates.

2019 Nigerian Senate election in Sokoto State
Party	Candidate	Votes	%
APC	Aliyu Magatakarda Wamakko	172,980	
PDP	Ahmed Muhammad Maccido	138,922	
Others		5,794	
Total votes		317,696	
APC hold			

=== Sokoto South ===
A total of 31 candidates registered with the Independent National Electoral Commission to contest in the election. APC candidate Shehu Abubakar Tambuwal won the election, defeating PDP Ibrahim Abdullahi Danbaba and 29 other party candidate. But the Court of Appeal Sokoto Division sacked the APC candidate and replaced him with the PDP candidate as the rightful winner.

2019 Nigerian Senate election in Sokoto State
Party	Candidate	Votes	%
APC	Shehu Abubakar Tambuwal	134,204	
PDP	Ibrahim Abdullahi Danbaba	112,546	
Others		3,089	
Total votes		249,839	
APC hold			

=== Sokoto East ===
A total of 32 candidates registered with the Independent National Electoral Commission to contest in the election. APC candidate Abdullahi Ibrahim Gobir won the election, defeating PDP Maidaji Salihu and 30 other party candidate.

2019 Nigerian Senate election in Sokoto State
Party	Candidate	Votes	%
APC	Abdullahi Ibrahim Gobir	170,665	
PDP	Maidaji Salihu	140,322	
Others		3,752	
Total votes		314,739	
APC hold			
