= Yan Taru =

Women's movement in the Sokoto Caliphate

The Yan Taru movement was started by Nana Asma'u dan Fodio in 1838 with the purpose of empowering and educating women in the then Sokoto Caliphate. The movement survived the death of its founder, the end of the Caliphate and also the period of Colonial Nigeria, and is still existing today.

With the establishment of the Caliphate in 1808, Shaikh Uthman dan Fodio made educating the women of his new state a priority. Coming from a Fulani background, he was raised by educated women as his Mother and Grandmother were learned. In Fulbe families, the teaching of Islamic studies to young children was tasked on the women. The Shaikh encouraged women to attend lectures of preachers and scholars. However, it was over two decades after his death would his daughter Nana Asma'u start her own movement for educating women.

== History of the movement ==
The term ƴan-taru means "the collective" or "those who have come together" in the Hausa language, the lingua-franca of the Sokoto Calipate. At around 1838, Nana Asma'u and her husband Gidado, the Grand Vizier of Sokoto, started holding classes on Islamic knowledge and history at their house in the city of Sokoto. They both wrote many books on Shaikh Uthman and Muhammand Bello. Originally in Arabic, Nana Asma'u translated a considerable number of both classical and modern works to Fulfulde and Hausa to make them more accessible to the non-Arabic speaking public. She focused on spreading Islamic knowledge in a simple way so it was easy to remember, for both the Jajis (teachers) and the students. She simplified subjects such as Aqedah, Fiqh and tazkiyyathul nafs. Asma'u taught that the asceticism and teaching skills of classical Sufi women and the characteristics and teachings of her brother Bello, the caliph, and her father Shaikh Uthman as examples to be followed.

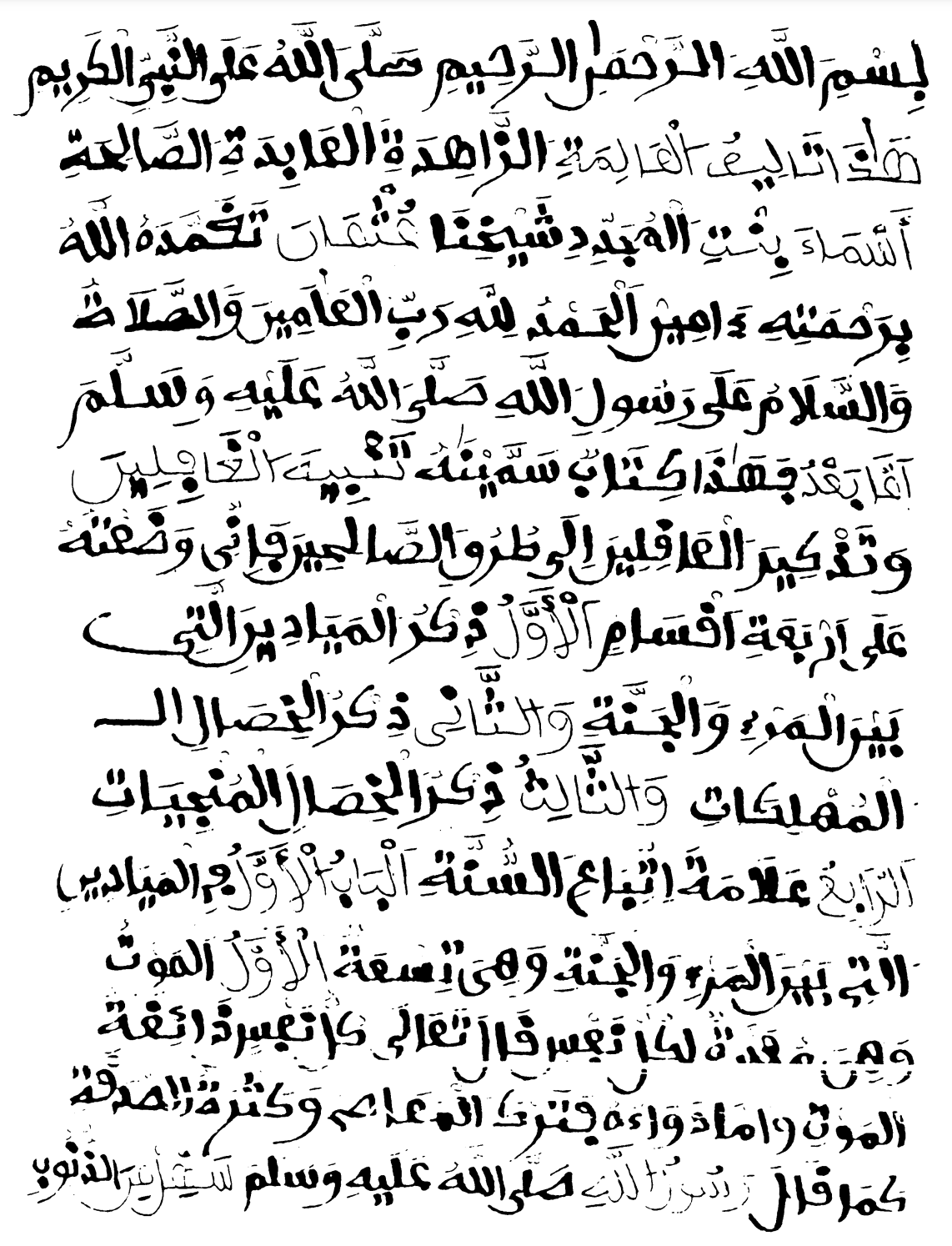
Excerpt from: Collected works of Nana Asma’u, daughter of Usman ‘dan Fodiyo (1793-1864).

Her classes grew larger as women from neighbouring villages regularly visited Sokoto to attend them. The movement was also known to educate young children. Nana Asma'u appointed Jajis who were learned women tasked with teaching women. She gave each a malfa which was a hat that served as a traditional symbol of office tied with a red turban. The malfa hats were made of fine silky grasses with a distinctive balloon shape as they are intended to be worn over turbans. They were usually worn by men. The late Waziri of Sokoto always wore one on formal occasions. The malfa is also one of the marks of the office used by the Lima of Gobir, the chief of women devotees of Mbori. Nana Asma'u intentionally used the malfa to devalue its uniqueness and change it from a symbol of the pagan religion of Bori to an emblem of Islam. She bestowed a red turban, or strip of red cloth, on each new Jaji. The turban was further proof of the wearer's authority granted by Nana Asma'u to each appointed Jaji.

Asma’u personally trained the jajis, providing them with lesson plans to spread Islamic works among the people by traveling to all over the caliphate educate people on pious behavior and rudimentary Islamic skills in the practicalities of daily life, to "reshape the common details of their life into Islamic form". Due to the ongoing jihad of the time, there many new converts to Islam and the Yan Taru movement through the Jajis helped educate them on basic Islamic values like prayer and Sunnah. Before her death, most women in Sokoto could learn and understand the basics of Islam.

After the death of Nana Asma'u in 1864, her sister Mariamu, also a respected scholar, continued the movement. The movement still exists today in the 21st century. They have been a major importance in determining elections in Northern Nigeria, where some women voters outnumbered the men. At the end of the Sokoto Caliphate and the beginning of British Colonial Northern Nigeria, the leader of the Yan Taru movement was Tamodi, a Granddaughter of Shaikh Uthman dan Fodio. Women still visited her in Sokoto particularly for Islamic education.

== Legacy ==
Many modern organisations in Northern Nigeria with a primary focus on educating women, such as Jam’iyar Matan Arewa, Women in Nigeria (WIN) and Federation of Muslim Women Association of Nigeria (FOMWAN), cited the Yan Taru movement as an inspiration. These organisations have been at the forefront for advocating and campaigning for quality schools and education for women and children in Nigeria especially in the North.

Almost two centuries after its founding, the movement has become global. Yan Taru has chapters in many states in the United States such as Pennsylvania, Texas, Alabama, Georgia, California and Florida with hundreds of women participating as students. They facilitate educational programs and social welfare for women around the world. There are other Jajis globally like Dylia bint Hamadi Camara who is from Mali who was named the national Jaji of the US Yan Taru group.
