= Nana Asmaʼu =

Nigerian princess and poet

Nana Asmaʼu (Nana Uwar daje)

Personal life
- Born: 1793 Degel, Sokoto Caliphate
- Died: 1864 (aged 70–71) Sokoto Caliphate
- Region: West Africa
- Main interest(s): Poetry, women's education, social protection, women's rights
- Other name: Nana Uwar daje Nana Asmaʼu bint Shehu Usman dan Fodiyo
- Occupation: Islamic scholar, Humanitarian Services, entrepreneur

Religious life
- Religion: Islam
- Denomination: Sunni
- Jurisprudence: Maliki
- Tariqa: Qadiriyyah
- Creed: Ash'ari

Muslim leader
- Influenced by: Usman dan Fodio
- Influenced: Muhammed Bello

Nana Asmaʾu (full name: Asmaʾu bint Shehu Usman dan Fodiyo, Arabic: نانا أسماء بنت عثمان فودي; 1793–1864) was a Fula princess, poet, teacher, public intellectual, political actor and scholarly authority and a daughter of the founder of the Sokoto Caliphate, Usman dan Fodio. She remains a revered figure in northern Nigeria.

== Biography ==
Nana Asmaʾu was born in 1793 in the remote community of Degel. She was named after Asmāʾ bint Abi Bakr, a Companion of Muhammad. During her childhood, she lived through the Fulani War (1804–08), a campaign of jihad which established the powerful Sokoto Caliphate, an Islamic empire. The daughter of the Caliphate's founder Usman dan Fodio (1754–1817) and half-sister of its second Sultan, Muhammed Bello (died 1837), she outlived most of the founding generation of the Caliphate and was an important source of guidance to its later rulers. From 1805, members of the Caliph's family came to great prominence, including the Caliph's female relatives. While Nana Asmaʾu became the most prominent, her sisters Maryam and Fatima, and the Caliph's wives Aisha and Hawwaʾu, played major literary and political roles in the new state.

Like her father, Nana Asmaʾu was educated in tafsir (Qur'anic studies), and placed a high value upon universal education. As exemplars of the Qadiriyya Sufis, dan Fodio and his followers stressed the sharing of knowledge, especially that of the sunnah, the example of Muhammad. To learn without teaching, they thought, was sterile and empty. Thus Nana Asmaʾu was devoted, in particular, to the education of women. Like most of the rest of her family, she became a prolific author. Her scholarship extended across law, theology, mysticism, history, and politics, reflecting a comprehensive Islamic intellectual training.

== Writer and counsellor ==
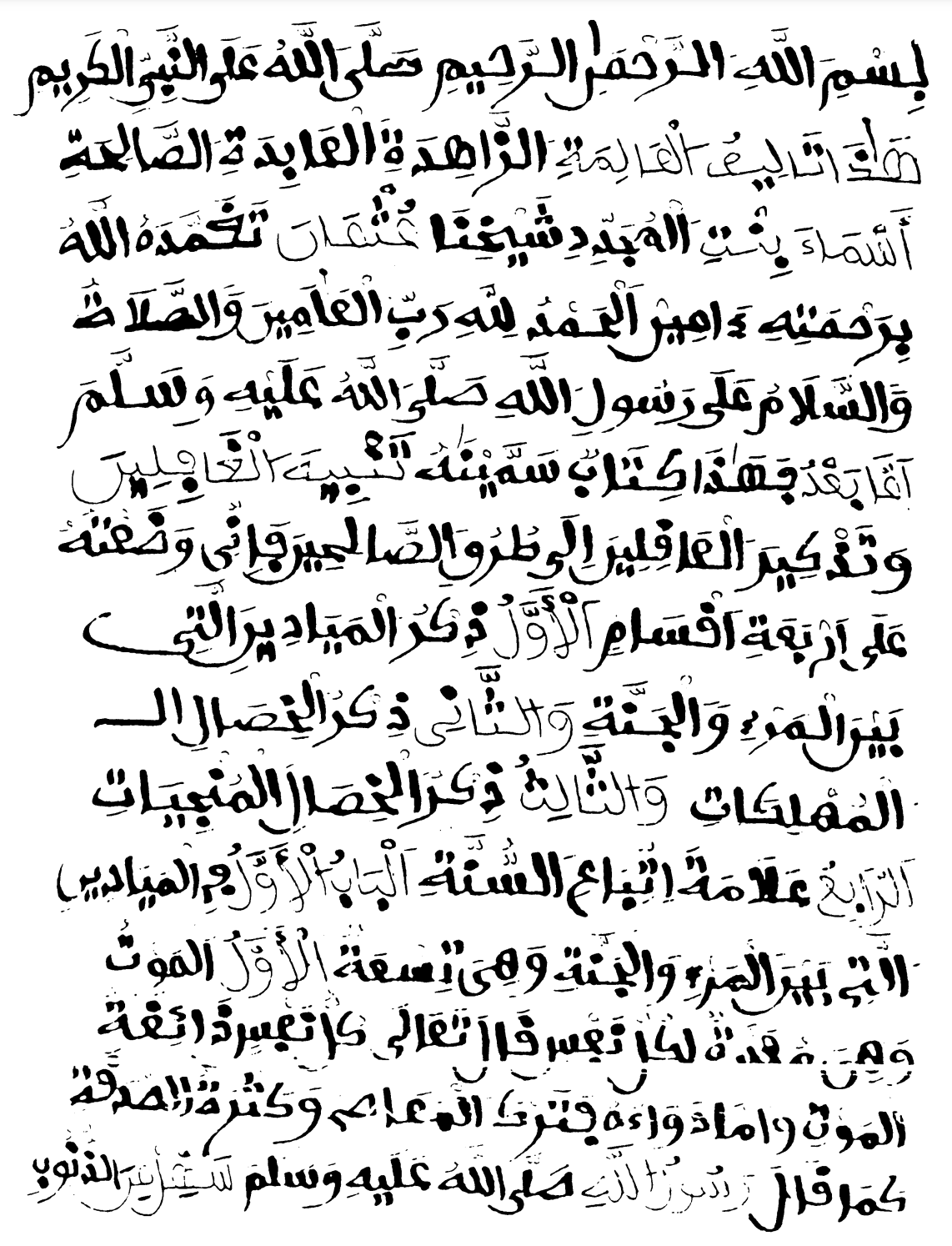
Manuscript of Nana Asmaʾu's works.

Well educated in the classics of the Arab and Classical world, and well versed in four languages, Arabic, Fula, Hausa and Tamacheq Tuareg. Nana Asmaʾu had a public reputation as a leading scholar in the most influential Muslim state in West Africa, which gave her the opportunity to correspond broadly. She witnessed many of the wars of the Fulani War and wrote about her experiences in the prose narrative Wakar Gewaye, "The Song of Wandering".

A major contribution rarely highlighted in general biographies:

- Nana Asma’u wrote in ʿAjamī scripts (African languages written in Arabic script).
- This allowed Islamic scholarship to spread beyond Arabic-literate elites.
- Her work represents a key example of Islamic intellectual localization in Africa.

This made her writings accessible to:

- Rural women
- Non-Arabic speakers
- Newly Islamized communities

As the Sokoto Caliphate began as a cultural and religious revolutionary movement, the writings of its leaders held a special place by which later generations, both rulers and ruled, could measure their society. She became a counsellor to her brother when he took the Caliphate, and he also recorded writing instructions to governors, debating with the scholars of foreign princes.

== Poet ==
Among her more than 60 surviving works written over 40 years, Nana Asmaʾu left behind a large body of poetry in Arabic, the Fula language, and Hausa, all written in the Arabic script. Many of these are historical narratives, but they also include elegies, laments, and admonitions. Her poetry often analysed social conflicts, religious reforms, and leadership ethics. Her poems of guidance became tools for teaching the founding principles of the Caliphate. Asmaʾu also collaborated closely with Muhammed Bello, the second Caliph. Her works include and expand upon the dan Fodio's strong emphasis on women leaders and women's rights within the community ideals of the Sunnah and Islamic law.

== Women's education ==
The surviving written works by Asmaʾu are related to Islamic education. For much of her adult life, she was responsible for women's religious education. Starting around 1830, she created a cadre of women teachers called jajiss, who travelled throughout the Caliphate educating women in the students' homes. In turn, each of these jajis used the writings of Nana Asmaʾu and other Sufi scholars, usually through recited mnemonics and poetry, to train crops of learned women called the ƴan-taru, or "those who congregate together, the sisterhood." To each jaji she bestowed a malfa, a hat and traditional ceremonial symbol of office of the Hausa animist priestesses in Gobir, tied with a red turban. The jajis thus became symbols of the new state, the new order, and of Islamic learning even outside women's communities. The network also:

- Provided marital guidance
- Assisted childbirth
- Offered communal counseling

This makes it one of the earliest structured female scholarly networks in Africa.

In part, this educational project began as a way to integrate newly conquered pagan captives into a Muslim ruling class. It expanded, however, to include the poor and rural, training teachers who travelled across the sprawling Caliphate.

== Contemporary legacy ==
Nana Asmaʾu's continued legacy rests not just on her literary work, but also on her role in defining the values of the Sokoto state. Today in Northern Nigeria, Islamic women's organisations, schools, and meeting halls are commonly named for her. She re-entered the debate on the role of women in Islam in the 20th century, as her legacy has been carried by Islamic scholars and immigrants to Europe and its academic debates.

The republishing and translation of her works has brought added attention to the purely literary value of her prose and poems. She is the subject of several studies, including Jean Boyd's The Caliph's Sister: Nana Asma'u 1793–1865: Teacher, Poet and Islamic Leader (1989), described as an "important book" that "provides a good read for the nonspecialist willing to discard common stereotypes about women in Africa", and One Woman's Jihad: Nana Asma'u, Scholar and Scribe by Beverly B. Mack and Jean Boyd (2000). The Collected Works of Nana Asma'u, Daughter of Usman dan Fodiyo 1793–1864, edited by Boyd and Mack, was published in 1997. An extract from Nana Asma'u's "Lamentation for 'Aysha II" is included in the 2019 anthology New Daughters of Africa, edited by Margaret Busby. other academic articles /chapters written about her are

- Nana Asma’u: Nineteenth‑Century West African Sufi
- Instruction and poetry for present day Muslim women
- yaqeen institute: A plea for saintly women: life & legacy of Nana Asmau
- African history extra: Life and works of Africa’s most famous woman scholar: Nana Asmau

In 2019, Governor Aminu Waziri Tambuwal of Sokoto state directed the state ministry of lands and housing to provide suitable land for the immediate take-off of the Nana Asmaʾu University of Medical Sciences in Sokoto, to be established by the Sultan foundation.

== See also ==
- Women in Islam

== Sources ==
- Mack, Beverly B.; Boyd, Jean (22 May 2000). One Woman's Jihad: Nana Asma'u, Scholar and Scribe. Indiana University Press. ISBN 978-0-253-21398-3.
