= Jega, Kebbi State =

Jega, Nigeria
- LGA and town
- Interactive map of Jega, Nigeria
- Coordinates: 12.3667°N 4.6333°E
- Country: Nigeria
- State: Kebbi State

Area
  - Total: 891 km^{2} (344 sq mi)

Population (2006)
  - Total: 193,352
  - Density: 217/km^{2} (562/sq mi)
- Time zone: UTC+1 (WAT)
- Postal code: 863

Jega is a town and Local Government Area in Kebbi State, Nigeria.

It has an area of 891 km^{2} and a population of 193,352 at the 2006 census.

The postal code of the area is 863.

== History ==
The town was founded by Muhammad al-Bukhari, a son of Abd al-Salam Bagimbane, one of the leaders of the Sokoto jihad who later revolted against the Sokoto Caliphate. After Abd al-Salam was killed by the Sokoto forces, al-Bukhari together with His brothers submitted to the first Emir of Gwandu Abdullahi dan Fodio (r. 1812–1828), who allowed them to settle on the banks of the River of Gindi with their large following as a share of their father Abd al-Salam Bagimbane, founding the towns of Jega, Alelu and Jandutsi. Mallam Abdullahi appointed him as Sarkin Kebbi of Jega after the killed of Sarkin Kebbi Hodi, by Abd al-Salam people at a place called Maciri in Jandutsi District.

== Climate ==
The temperature in the wet season is hot, oppressive, and mostly cloudy, while in the dry season it's sweltering and partly cloudy.

Jega experiences a tropical continental climate with a single wet season peaking between July and August. The remainder of the year is mostly dry, with high temperatures and dusty Harmattan conditions in the early months.

== Notable people ==
- Attahiru Jega
- Engr Yusuf Shamsu (Civil Engineer)
- Alh. Muhammed Arzika (District Head)
- Ahmed Jafar
- Abdurrashid Bawa (Former EFCC Chairman)
