= 2019 Sokoto State House of Assembly election =

Election in Nigeria

The 2019 Sokoto State House of Assembly election was held on 9 March 2019, to elect members of the Sokoto State House of Assembly in Nigeria. All the 30 seats were up for election in the Sokoto State House of Assembly.

Aminu Achida from APC representing Wurno constituency was elected Speaker, while Abubakar Magaji from PDP representing Bodinga North constituency was elected Deputy Speaker.

== Results ==
The result of the election is listed below.

- Aminu Magaji from APC won Dange/Shuni constituency
- Mustapha Abdullahi from APC won Sokoto South I constituency
- Malami Ahmed from PDP won Sokoto South II constituency
- Suke Romo from PDP won Tambuwal West constituency
- Mode Ladan PDP Tambuwal East constituency
- Musa Miko from PDP won Tangaza constituency
- Murtala Maigona from APC won Wamakko constituency
- Aminu Achida from APC won Wurno constituency
- Shehu Yabo from APC won Yabo constituency
- Haliru Buhari from PDP won Sokoto North I constituency
- Ibrahim Arzika from PDP won Sokoto North II constituency
- Abdullahi Randa from PDP won Tureta constituency
- Umaru Sahabi from PDP won Binji constituency
- Abubakar Magaji from PDP won Bodinga North constituency
- Bala Tukur from APC won Bodinga South constituency
- Altine Kyadawa from APC won Gada West constituency
- Kabiru Dauda from APC won Bada East constituency
- Mustapha Balle from PDP won Gudu constituency
- Bello Idris from APC won Gwadabawa South constituency
- Abdullahi Garba from APC won Gwadabawa North constituency
- Bello Ambarura from APC won Illela constituency
- Habibu Modachi from PDP won Isa constituency
- Abdullahi Mahmud from PDP won Kware constituency
- Abdullahi Zakari from APC won Rabah constituency
- Almustapha Aminu from PDP won Sabon Birni North constituency
- Saidu Ibrahim from APC won Sabon Birni South constituency
- Alhaji Maidawa from APC won Shagari constituency
- Atiku Liman from PDP won Silame constituency
- Isa Harisu from APC won Kebbe constituency
- Faruku Amadu from APC won Goronyo
