= Manir Dan Iya =

Nigerian politician

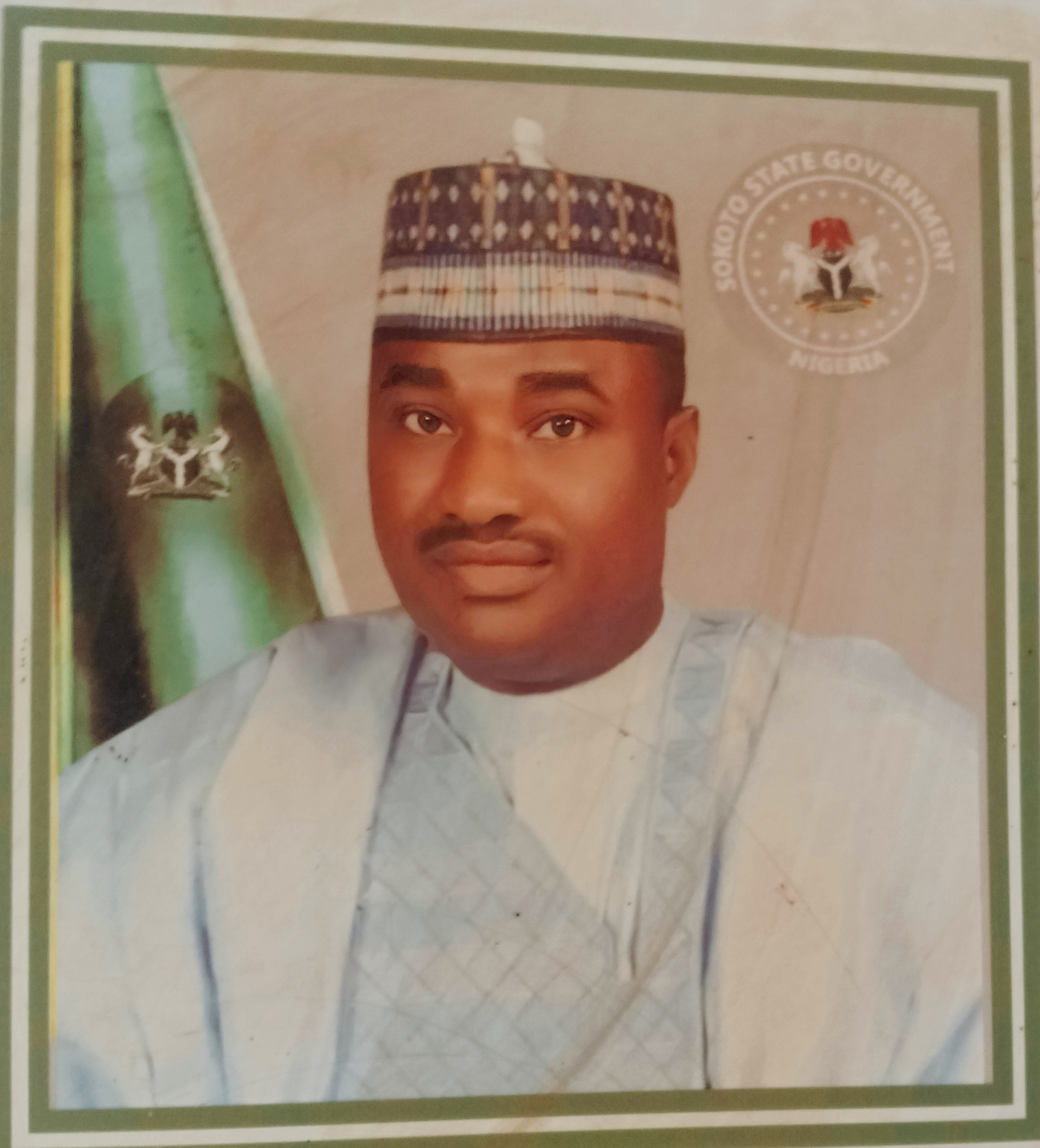

Deputy Governor of Sokoto State
- In office 23 November 2018 – 29 May 2023
- Governor: Aminu Tambuwal
- Preceded by: Ahmad Aliyu
- Succeeded by: Idris Muhammad Gobir

Personal details
- Born: Maniru Muhammad Dan Iya Kware, Sokoto State, Nigeria
- Party: People's Democratic Party
- Education: Usmanu Danfodiyo University

Manir Muhammad Dan Iya Sardaunan Kware is a Nigeria politician who served as the Deputy Governor of Sokoto State in the People's Democratic Party (PDP) from 2018 to 2023. He hails from Kware Local Government Area, Sokoto State. and is a Muslim by Religion.

== Early life and education ==
Dan Iya, attended Magajin Gari Model Primary School, Sokoto, from 1977 to 1983, and later proceeded to the Science Secondary School, Farfaru, between 1983 and 1989.

A BSc graduate of Economics Education from Usmanu Danfodiyo University, Sokoto, Dan Iya also obtained various certificates from different higher institutions of learning within and outside the state, which include a Higher Diploma in Accounting and Finance from the College of Administration, Sokoto, a professional Diploma in Public Account and Audit from Abdu Gusau Polytechnic, Sokoto, a Diploma in Computer studies from the Usmanu Danfodiyo University, Sokoto, a Diploma in Arabic from UDUS, a Certificate in Local Government Administration from the College of Administration, Sokoto, and both Junior and Senior Certificates in Arabic from UDUS.

== Career ==
During ten years of work in the Nigerian Civil Service, Dan Iya worked with Sokoto state Local Government Service Commission and got posted to Kware Local Government from 1992 to 2002. He also held various positions in the Account section of the Local Government before he resigned as Principal Accountant in 2002.

He entered politics in 2003 and was Kware Local Government Council Sole Administrator. In 2004, he was elected as Executive Chairman, Kware local government council, a position he held up to 2007. He was later Chairman and Managing Director of Manmodiya Nigeria Limited, and was a Special Advisor to former Speaker of the House of Representatives, Barrister Aminu Waziri Tambuwal from 2011 to 2015. He was appointed as Legal Advisor of the All Progressives Congress (APC), Sokoto state.

In 2015, Governor Aminu Waziri Tambuwal appointed Dan Iya as a member of Sokoto State Executive Council and Commissioner in charge of Ministry for local government and community development, and oversees ministry for local government affairs, from 2019.
