= Dogondoutchi =

Commune in Dosso, Niger

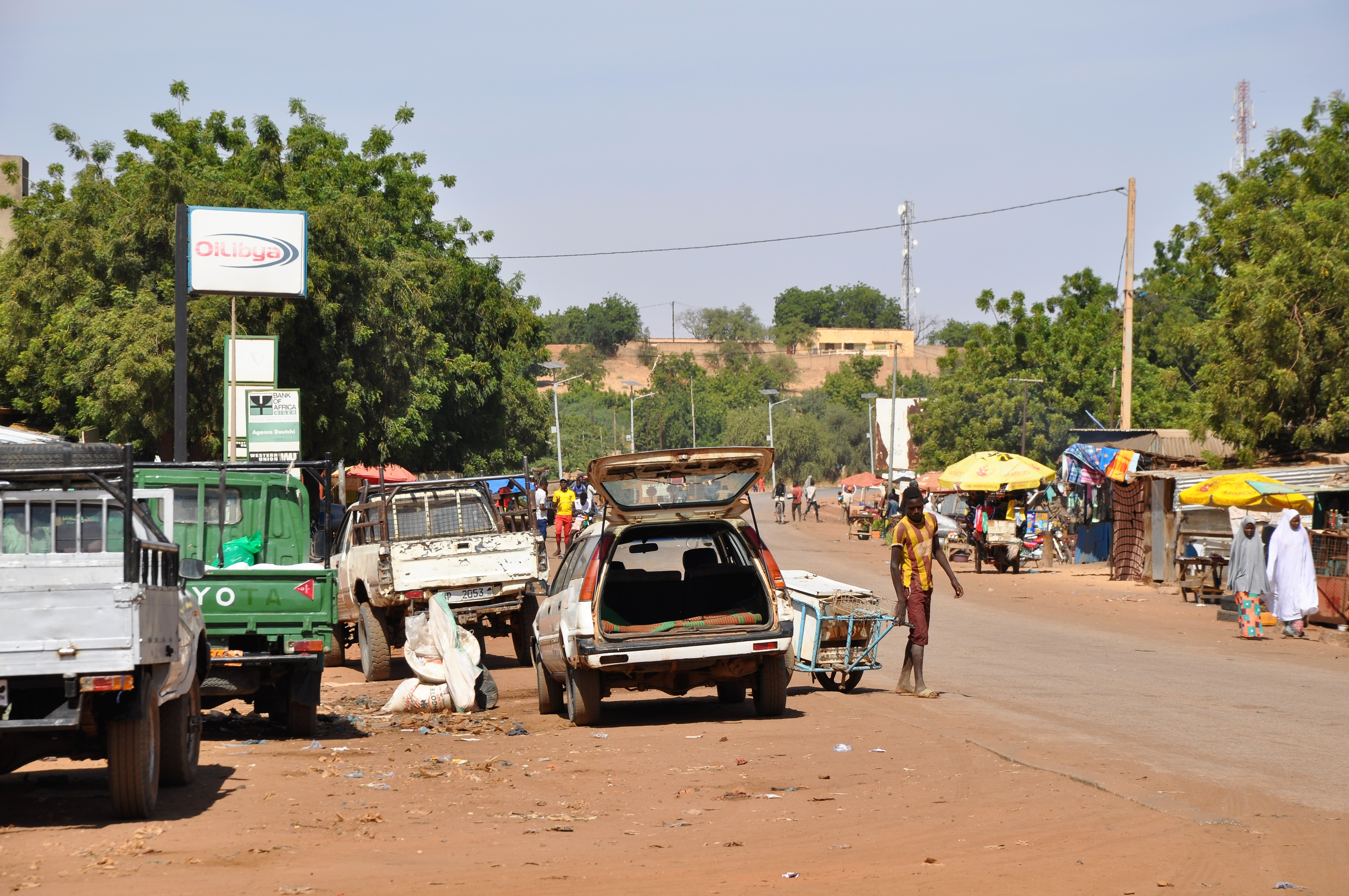
- Street scene in Dogondoutchi

- Location within Niger
- Coordinates: 13°38′46″N 4°01′44″E
- Country: Niger
- Region: Dosso
- Department: Dogondoutchi

Area
  - City: 678.0 km^{2} (261.8 sq mi)
- Elevation: 227 m (745 ft)

Population (2012 census)
  - City: 71,692
  - Density: 105.7/km^{2} (273.9/sq mi)
  - Urban: 36,971
  - Metro: 372,473 (Dogondoutchi department)

Dogondoutchi ("High Hill", also nicknamed Doutchi) is a commune in Niger. It is located about 300 km east of the capital Niamey and 40 km from the Nigerian border. It lies on national route 1 which links the capital to the towns of Maradi and Zinder to the east and the RN25 heading to north to Tahoua, Agadez and Arlit.

The limits of the Dogondoutchi district are roughly those of the ancient region of the Arewa. Since 2008, Dogondoutchi is the administrative centre of the surrounding Dogondoutchi department which carries the same name. It is part of the Dosso Region. The population is near 70,000 distributed over the urban centre with near 40,000, 17 villages lying 5 to 30 km from the centre and 5 Fula tribes.

== Geography and geology ==
=== Site of Dogondoutchi ===
The town of Dogondoutchi is dominated to the north by the imposing hill from which it derives its name and it lies along an intermittent river, the Mawri Dallol. It is situated in the southeast of Niger between the Sahel to the north and the edge of the savanna zone to the south.

The region is marked by wide valleys (Dallols) which are generally dry and which, in the rainy season, drain a vast area extending from high areas of the Aïr and the Adrar de Iforas in the north to the River Niger in the south. In this sedimentary basin there are extensive sand and clay deposits, the most recent dating from the Tertiary and Quaternary periods. As a result of a later drier climate during the Quaternary period, they hardened to form impermeable lateritic plateaus worn down to form a multitude of short ravines (koris) through which the rain water reaches the Mawri Dallol.

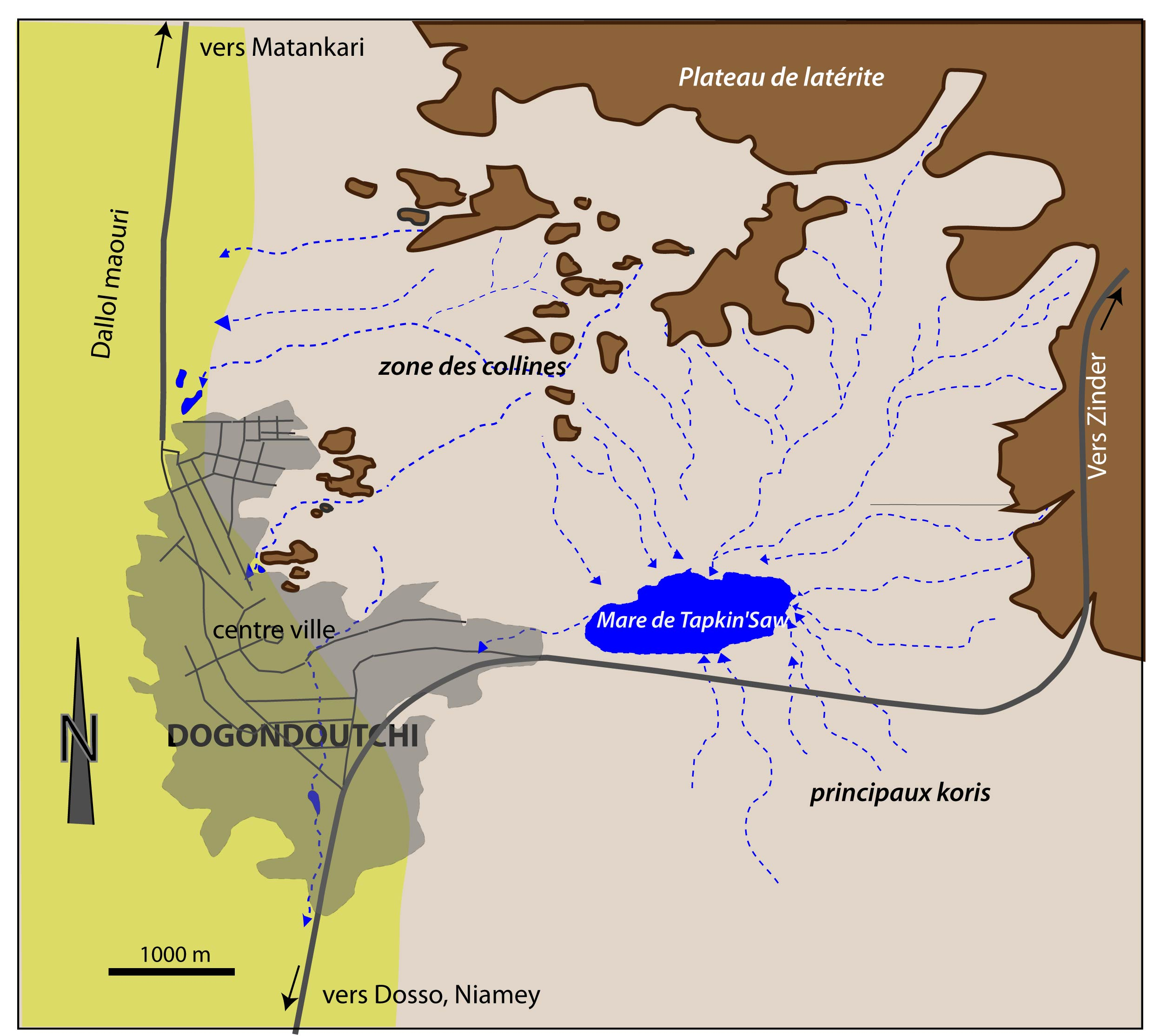

=== Rainfall, drought and the struggle against erosion ===
The annual rainfall in Dogondoutchi varies from 400 to 600 mm, roughly equivalent to that of the Mediterranean region in France but it takes place only between June and October and there is never any rain from October to May. The rainfall may be very intense – 50, to 150 mm a day, which leads to flash floods causing structural damage to the dry clay (so-called banco) houses along the koris and carrying off arable soil. The water is rapidly absorbed into the underground water layers or it reaches ponds which either dry out after the end of the rainy season or remain semi permanent (for example the Tapkin Saw close to the town). Following the catastrophic floods of 2002 the inhabitants, in association with international aide and the United Nations "Food For Work" Programme, constructed five kilometres of dykes which now protect the town. The experience gained during this operation has served in other parts of Niger and in Mali thanks to the Niger NGO "RAIL"

=== Access to drinking water ===
The surface water (temporary ponds) around Dogondoutchi is of use for animals but is not fit for human consumption. There exists however, a deep water layer but its use poses some problems: the local terrain made up of sand or gravel needs to be blocked up and the depth of the well (25 to 75m) requires the use of much energy to raise the water. This is provided by direct manpower (or more often womanpower) and by the use of animals. To surmount these problems, the local authorities mandated an agency from Niger which proposed a programme of rehabilitation and construction of around a hundred wells across the local area as well as the training of local maintenance staff. This programme, to be completed in 2016 has been financed through international co-operation and local funding.

== Population ==
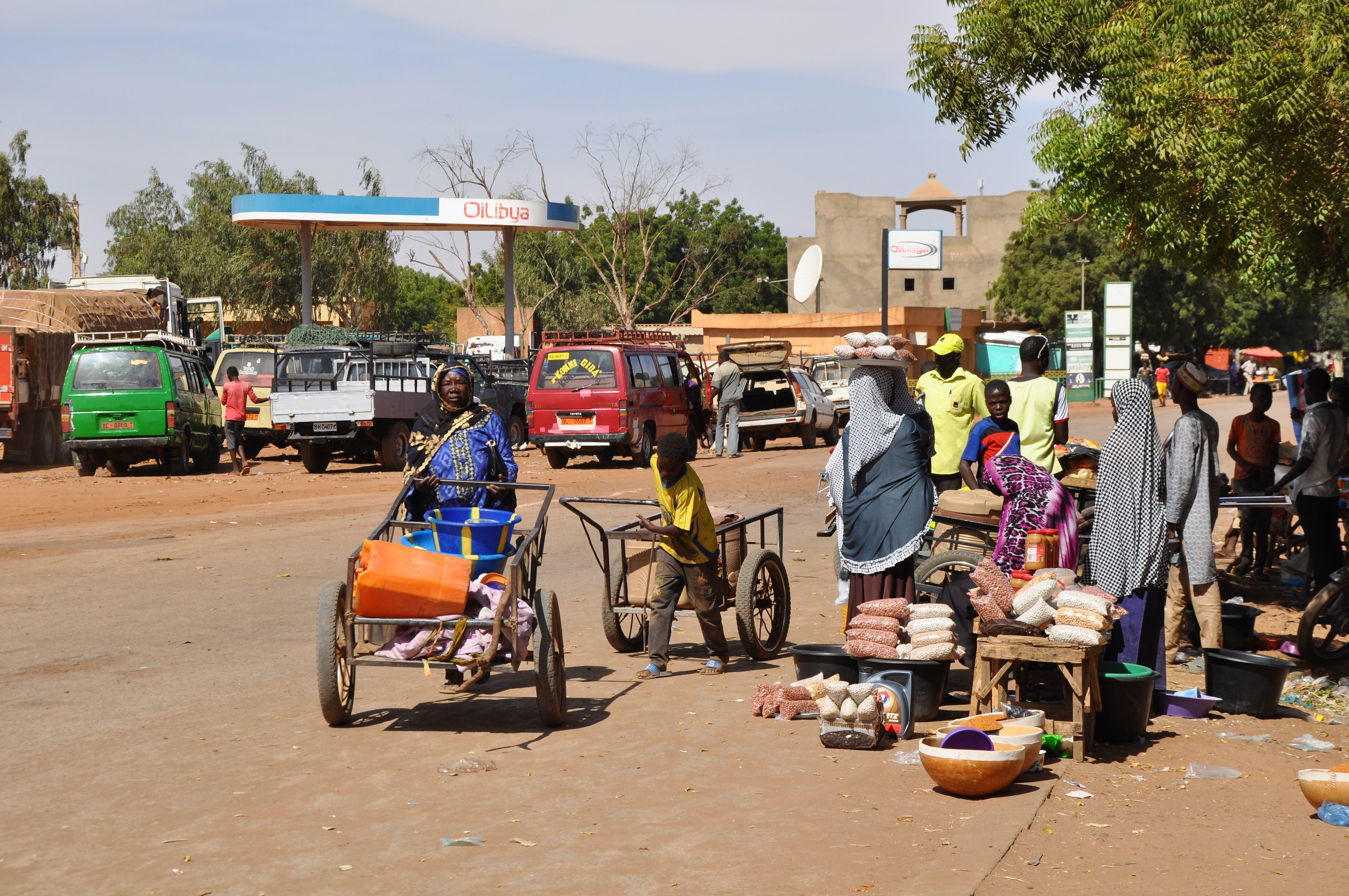
Street scene in Dogondoutchi

The population is estimated to be near 80 000 (2011) with around 30 000 in the urban centre (previous figures near 57 000 in 2008 and near 7300 in 1966). The population is spread over 11 town districts, 17 villages lying 5 to 30 km from the centre and 5 Fula tribes. The ethnic groups are by order of numerical importance, the Hausa, the Fula, the Tuareg and the Djerma. Dogondoutchi is the common western border of the Hausa population, who form a majority of the population in an arc stretching from this area towards the east (Zinder). The Djerma who form the majority of the sedentary population of Niger are mostly settled towards the west whereas Dongondoutchi is the southern limit for the Fula who are pastoralists with semi-nomadic villages. Dogondoutchi marks the rough boundary between the Wodaabe (Central-Eastern Niger) Fula people and the Dallol and Bitinkoore Fulfulde dialect speaking Fula people of the west. Some of the older members of the Fula are settled. The Hausa and the Djerma are settled farmers mostly cultivating pearl millet and cowpea (small bean). The Tuareg initially from the north are also settled but continue to raise cattle in the traditional manner. Some also grow crops or are involved in commerce.

== Administration ==
The town is administrated by the town council, which since the reforms of 2004, is elected. However, as is the case throughout Niger, the traditional chieftainship represented by a chief called "Kona" in association with the chiefs of the neighbourhoods and of the canton continue to raise taxes and also stimulate public awareness concerning the development of the town.

== History ==
Dogondoutchi is known as the cultural centre of the Arewa region which roughly corresponds to the birthplace of the Mawari a subgroup of the Hausa. The history of Dogondoutchi is essentially that of the old region of the Arewa. In the 19th century, Queen Sarraounia who lived at Lougou initially resisted the Tuareg invasion and opposed the 1899 colonial offensive by the Voulet-Chanoine mission (Battle of Lougou). After much destruction and the massacre of many, a French military post was set up at Dogondoutchi which was the site of a village of the Kwanawa surrounded by other villages that later gave rise to the different neighbourhoods of the town. The site of Dogondoutchi at the centre of the Arewa then favoured the installation and development of an administrative centre.

== Religion ==
The dominant religion (95%) in Dogondoutchi is Islam as it is in for Niger as a whole and there are many mosques. The Maouris around Dogondoutchi are the last surviving animists amongst the Hausa. The town is also a centre for gatherings of the Bori spirit possession ritual which has been studied by western anthropologists. The town also houses Catholic and Protestant missions.

== Public health ==
=== Hospitals and medical care ===
The health facilities in Dogondoutchi (2015) comprise a district hospital, a mother and child centre, three integrated health centres and seven health units relating to the neighbouring villages. There are 3 doctors, 14 nurses (male and female), 6 qualified midwives, 4 "matrons", 4 pharmacies and 2 pharmacy depots. Most of the births take place in a health centre and this has had a beneficial impact on the mother and child survival rate. The existence of the lakes leads to the proliferation of mosquitoes related with malaria.

=== Sanitation ===
To improve hygiene, the inhabitants have set up a Central Health Committee which has stimulated progress concerning the construction of latrines together with education in hygiene, and the organisation of refuse collection.

==== Installation of latrines ====
The programme for the construction of latrines and of waste water catch basins for individual houses was financed through loans obtained from a micro loan agency which was set up by a local woman group for this purpose. Since the end of the 1990s, more than 600 individual latrines have been built. In addition, latrines have been installed in schools and in public places with some also comprising showers. The success of this enterprise of family financing is unique in Africa (FARM report page 20). In the villages lying away from the town where the standard of living is lower, family latrines corresponding to the available individual funding have been constructed by the inhabitants themselves. Prior to this, a programme initiated by USAID was set up to raise awareness concerning hygiene following the CLTS method(Community-Led Total Sanitation). Meetings were held in each of the villages and were supported by the local radio station (Radio Dallol).

==== Refuse collection ====
Confronted with the problems linked with the irregular collection of waste and with their dispersion by domestic animals, the Central Sanitation Committee and the Neighborhood Councils with the help of the international agencies (Department of Essonne, AESN, SIOM) installed 20 waste containers in each neighbourhood and organised the collection of waste. A carter empties the containers two or three times a week using an ox and cart provided by the town council. The ox is initially supplied to the carter who ensures its upkeep and is able to purchase it after about 18 months activity. In the zones of economic activity, markets etc., each participating tradesman has (in 2015) the use of two garbage cans, one for biodegradable waste and one for plastics etc. The waste is either emptied in a garbage dump or bought and recycled by the inhabitants. A joint committee has been set up to monitor this programme and to address the severe problem posed by plastic waste which at present is burnt.

== Education and cultural activities ==
=== Schools ===
Ten different languages are in daily use in Niger and at least four are in use in Dogondoutchi. The official language is however French. The children follow an initiation in French from the first year in primary school which lasts 6 years. From the fourth year in primary school and during all of the secondary school, teaching is only in French. There are (in 2015) 67 primary schools, including 1 Franco-Arabic, with a total of 299 classes and 36 959 pupils – 17 597 girls, 19 362 boys (numbers provided by the local school inspectors in 2015). There are 7 secondary colleges (4 public including 1 Franco Arabic, 3 private including 1 Franco-Arabic) and 6 high schools (3 public including 1 general education, 1 technical, 1 Franco-Arabic and 3 private including 1 Franco-Arabic). The total enrolment in the secondary schools is 20 173 (11 918 boys, 8 255 girls).

The proportion of girls in primary education is almost the same as that of the boys whereas at the secondary level the proportion of girls is lower. The percentage of children in full-time education (nearly 100%) is much higher than that in Niger as a whole (girls 63.9%, boys 81.9%, total 72.9%,). The general education high school is attended by 1049 pupils and there are 20 classes of from 40 to 80 students. In addition 2995 children attend nursery and infant schools. These play an important role in preparing the children for primary school where they will learn French. Many problems remain in the school system concerning, for example, the training of teachers and the supply of school equipment. At the primary level, notebooks and pens are now provided .by the State.

=== Cultural activities ===
Dogondoutchi has a youth and culture centre and two cultural centres. The oldest is the Waye-Kaï Center set up by the Catholic Mission and open to all. The library there was for a long time the only one in the town. The school at the mission established in 1947 by the Rédemptoristes Fathers, has helped train many of the elite of Niger of all religions. The CREED (Educational Resource and Exchange in Dogondoutchi) opened in 2011 close to the high school and to one of the junior colleges. The centre was initially destined for pupils and teachers but it is now open to all. In particular it offers an initiation in computing. It is supported by the State Department of Education through the provision of staff for the library, for the training in information technology and in maintenance. To encourage literacy and to help with the learning of French, a number of containers each with a hundred or so African books for children funded by the twinned town of Orsay (France) have been distributed in the schools. The books may be borrowed by the children for their own pleasure or for that of the other members of the family. Finally, there are 15 very animated centres dedicated to reading and writing.

== Economy ==
=== Agriculture ===
The agricultural production is strongly dependent on the climate which is that of the Sahel (see 1.1). To increase the amount of arable land and to limit erosion a system of stone rows has been set up. These complement the dykes that were installed around the town (see 1.2). Growth in the fields is only possible during the rainy season (June – October). After, the production continues to March–April on areas around the temporary ponds until they dry up.

==== Traditional and developing open field agriculture ====
The traditional crops are pearl millet (a small grain cereal) and cowpea (a small bean). The output is low (200 to 300 kg/ha for millet) since the sandy soil is poor in clay and in organic matter. The seed company Ahleri was established in Dogondoutchi in 2008 by agronomists from Niger who were trained in Nigeria. This gave rise to a local initiative which was further supported by international funding that increased both agricultural output and revenue. It was proposed that each farmer reserve part of his land (roughly 1 hectare) for the use of improved seeds together with micro-doses of fertiliser. In 2013, 170 farmers from 5 villages were involved with a total area of 230 hectares. Over a three-year period when the rainfall was at a reasonable level, this method led to a 70% increase of production compared to that obtained in the nearby traditionally cultivated field. The farmers who followed this programme often increased their sales turnover by more than 50%. This procedure was also tested during the drought of 2011 when it also helped to foster mutual support within the community. Several factors are necessary to obtain this result. 1) improved agricultural methods, 2) the availability of micro-credits which may be repaid not just after the harvest when the prices are low but later when the market price reaches a reasonable level, 3) the availability of storage facilities during this time, 4) the organisation of mutual aid between the farmers at the level of each village. The increase in the level of cereal production has led to an increase in the amount raised through local taxes.

==== Market gardening ====
The areas concerned occupy about 20 hectares, mostly around the Tapkin Saw lake 1 to 2 km north west of the urban centre and around the village of Liguido. Traditionally they chiefly produce green vegetables but after the severe drought of 2005, it was suggested that the farmers around the Tapkin Saw diversify their production notably by growing more energy providing crops such as the potato. To this end the association "Agro Sans Frontières" from Brittany provided the potato seeds without charge and this led to the organisation of a profitable commercial activity. The drought of 2011 stimulated a programme to extend the area that could be cultivated. A technical and hydrological study led to the project for an irrigation system, derived from the deep wells, which covers 80 hectares and which functions throughout the year. Attempts are underway to obtain the financing for an initial area of 33 hectares.

==== Cattle and goats ====
The raising of cattle and goats is usually carried out by the nomadic Fula population, who after the harvest, move southwards to make use of the grazing left in the fields. The rules concerning the access to the fields are controlled by the traditional chief (Kona). Each family possesses some farmyard animals such as guinea fowl and they also fatten veal before sale.

=== Crafts and businesses ===
A number of the traditional crafts are present in the urban centre (carpentry, iron work). In 2005, a local artisan developed a system of extraction from the wells which limits the contamination of the well by using two separated systems of ropes, one inside the well and one outside. This system has been adopted for all of the wells built or renovated through the programme supported by international aid (AESN). A technical training centre and a technical high school have been established locally to develop skills related to the installation and upkeep of the various technical facilities (irrigation, sinking of wells, water distribution, auto mechanics, etc.).

=== Commerce ===
Dogondoutchi is situated at the junction of routes to the north, to Nigeria, to the east and to the west (Niamey). It possesses a hotel and many restaurants and it is a centre of commerce both for food and clothing. The bustling Friday market offers a wide selection of local products (cereals and vegetables) and it also comprises a cattle market.
