= Ibrahim Abdullahi Danbaba =

Nigerian politician (born 1953)

Senator for Sokoto South
- Incumbent
- Assumed office 9 June 2015

Personal details
- Born: 1 January 1953 (age 73) Sabon Birni, Northern Region, British Nigeria (now in Sokoto State, Nigeria)
- Party: Peoples Democratic Party
- Education: University of Sokoto
- Occupation: Politician; accountant

Ibrahim Abdullahi Danbaba (born 1 January 1953) is a Nigerian politician and accountant, He is the Senator representing Sokoto South Senatorial District in the 9th National Assembly.

== Early life and education ==
Danbaba was born in Sabon Birni, Sokoto State, he attended Government Secondary School Gusan where he obtained his West African School Certificate (WAEC) in 1979. He proceeded to the Advance Teachers College, Sokoto where he was awarded his NCE in 1976. He studied Management at the University of Sokoto and graduated in 1981. He got is Advanced diploma in Accounting at the Loton College of Higher Education, United Kingdom in 1989.

== Political career ==
Danbaba was the Deputy Governor of Sokoto State from 1999 to 2003. He was elected as senator representing Sokoto south senatorial district in March 2015. In June 2018, He defected to the People's Democratic Party. On February 23, 2019 Shehu Tambuwal was elected as the senator representing Sokokto South senatorial district having polled 134,204 votes while Danbaba polled 112,546 votes. In November, 2019, The Court of Appeal Sokoto Division returned Senator Ibrahim Danbaba as Senator to the National Assembly as Senator Shehu Tambuwal was removed from office following the reversal of judgement/dismissal of the petition by Election Petition Tribunal.
