= Maouri people =

Ethnic group in western Africa

The Maouri people are an ethnic group in western Africa. They are one of the major ethnic groups of Niger, and are concentrated around the Dallol Maouri (Maouri Valley) of the Niger River, extending from Matankari, near Niamey, to Gaya. They are a subgroup of the Hausa people, and speak both the Hausa language and the Djerma language (or Zarma). When using the Zarma language, they are known as the Arawa people.

The establishment of the Maouri people is uncertain, though many sources indicate descent from the Bornu Empire. The Maouri established two capitals in Matankari and Lougou, with religious authority based in Bagaji.

The Maouri are animistic, with beliefs based on the Doguwa spirits. Islam (especially in Dogondoutchi) and Christianity have since gained some adherents among the Maouri, but they still largely hold to traditional beliefs, including fetishes. They resisted an attempted forced conversion to Islam in the early 19th century during the Fula jihads and subsequent establishment of the Sokoto Caliphate.

The Maouri were also subject to colonization by European powers. The Maouri lands were traded between the English and French colonies in West Africa under various treaties between 1890 and 1906. The French were particularly brutal in their administration of their colonies: in 1898 the priestess of Lougou, Sarraounia, resisted an attack by the French Voulet–Chanoine Mission at the Battle of Lougou. The town ultimately fell, though Sarraounia's forces managed a retreat and were able to inflict ten casualties on the much more numerous and better-armed French soldiers. The French later massacred the neighboring Konni town of Birni-N'Konni in revenge.

Today, the Maouri are traders and farmers.
