= Kware =

- LGA and town
- Interactive map of Kware
- Location within Nigeria
- Coordinates: 13°13′5″N 5°16′2″E
- Country: Nigeria
- State: Sokoto State

Government
  - Type: Democracy
  - Local Government Chairman: Ibrahim Attahiru
  - Senator: Aliyu Wamakko
  - House of Representatives: Ahmad Kalambaina

Area
  - Total: 554 km^{2} (214 sq mi)

Population (2006)
  - Total: 133,899
  - Density: 242/km^{2} (626/sq mi)
- Time zone: UTC+1 (WAT)
- 3-digit postal code prefix: 841
- ISO 3166 code: NG.SO.KW

Kware is a town and Local Government Area in Sokoto State, Nigeria.

It has an area of 554 km^{2} and a population of 133,899 at the 2006 census. It is led by a politician called Hon. Usman Mohammed Balkore. Kware has a high number of literate people.

The postal code of the area is 841.

== History ==
Kware was established by Abd al-Salam, a well-respected Hausa scholar, in 1812. He was one of the leaders of the Sokoto jihad and had a significant following. After the establishment of the Sokoto Caliphate and the subsequent construction of Sokoto town, the responsibilities of governing were partitioned among the leaders of the jihad movement. This distribution encompassed divisions like the western and eastern sections under the leadership of Abdullahi and Muhammad Bello respectively. Other leaders were similarly assigned different territories within this structure. For his portion, Abd al-Salam was tasked with overseeing seven districts in Abdullahi's portion with the largest being Sabiyel (today in Aleiro). Abd al-Salam was not satisfied with this distribution as he felt it did not reflect his contribution to the jihad. Sensing the potential for unrest, Shehu Usman invited Abd al-Salam to Sokoto. He was ordered to relocate to Sokoto and was allowed to establish the town of Kware near Sokoto by Usman so that he could be monitored by Muhammad Bello.

The followers of Abd al-Salam relocated to Kware which led to the town's rapid growth in population and farmlands. Abd al-Salam continued to have non-violent conflicts with the Sokoto government which led to his base of Kware being a hub for those were aggrieved with Sokoto. Eventually, these tensions culminated in a full-fledged revolt led by Abd al-Salam against the Sokoto Caliphate in 1817, an event that transpired during the reign of Sultan Bello. Consequently, Kware was invaded by Sokoto's forces with Abd al-Salam fleeing to Bakura where he died to an arrow wound in 1818.
