= Degel =

Nigerian town

Degel is a town in Sokoto State, northern Nigeria.

Once a part of the Hausa city-state of Gobir, Degel is particularly noted for being the home of Fulani Islamic reformer Usman dan Fodio from 1774 to 1804. Dan Fodio built a large following in the area until, fearing his growing power, Yunfa of Gobir ordered him and his followers into exile, triggering the Jihad of Usman dan Fodio.
